= The Rapture discography =

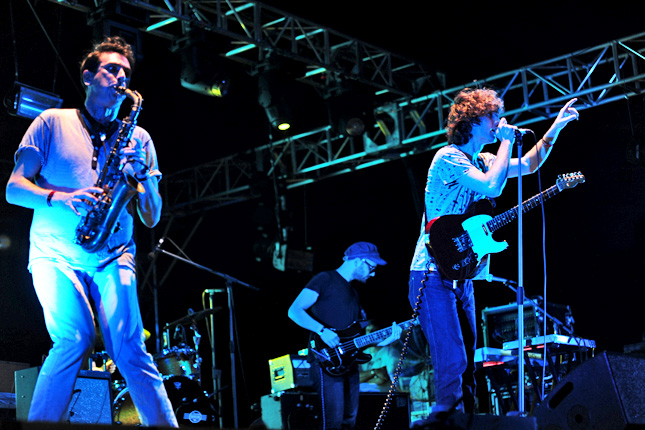
- The Rapture performing at the 2011 Southbound Festival
- Studio albums: 4
- EPs: 2
- Singles: 13

American rock band The Rapture has released four studio albums, two extended plays, and thirteen singles.

The band first released their mini-album Mirror in 1999 under Gravity Records. This project did not chart in any countries. In 2002, the band released the song "House of Jealous Lovers", which originally didn't chart in any countries, but due to a re-recorded re-release of the song in 2003, it peaked at 27 on the UK Singles Chart. Later that year, the Rapture released their debut full-length studio album Echoes under DFA Records. After parting ways with the DFA, the band released their second full-length studio album, titled Pieces of the People We Love, in 2006. After a short hiatus, the band signed with DFA again and released In the Grace of Your Love in 2011. The Rapture officially disbanded in 2014.

== Albums ==
=== Studio albums ===
List of albums, with selected chart positions
Title	Album details	Peak chart positions										Certifications
Title	Album details	US	AUS	BEL (FL)	FRA	GER	IRE	SCO	SWE	SWI	UK	Certifications
Echoes	Released: September 8, 2003; Label: DFA, Vertigo, Universal; Formats: CD, LP, download	121	— (Note: Echoes did not enter the Australian ARIA Albums Chart but peaked at number six on the ARIA Hitseekers Chart.)	—	52	—	—	31	55	—	32	BPI: Silver
Pieces of the People We Love	Released: September 12, 2006; Label: Universal, Vertigo; Formats: CD, LP, download	113	67	75	77	—	52	39	—	—	40	
In the Grace of Your Love	Released: September 2, 2011; Label: DFA; Formats: CD, LP, download	125	53	64	45	86	—	—	—	59	93	
"—" denotes releases that did not chart or were not released in that territory.

=== Mini-album ===
List of mini-albums
Title	Album details
Mirror	Released: January 26, 1999; Label: Gravity; Formats: CD, LP

== Extended plays ==
List of extended plays
Title	Album details
Out of the Races and Onto the Tracks	Released: May 21, 2001; Label: Sub Pop; Formats: CD, LP
Insound Tour Support Series No. 19	Released: 2001; Label: Insound; Formats: CD

== Singles ==
List of singles, with selected chart positions
Title	Year	Peak chart positions										Album
Title	Year	AUS Hit.	AUS Club	BEL (FL)	FRA	MEX Air.	SCO	UK	UK Dance	UK Indie	UK Rock	Album
"The Chair That Squeaks"	1998	—	—	—	—	—	—	—	—	—	—	Non-album singles
"House of Jealous Lovers"	2002	—	—	—	—	—	—	132	—	—	—	Non-album singles
"House of Jealous Lovers" (re-release)	2003	—	—	—	—	—	26	27	17	—	3	Echoes
"Sister Saviour"	2003	—	—	—	—	—	54	51	—	28	8	Echoes
"Love Is All"	2004	—	—	—	—	—	43	38	—	—	7	Echoes
"I Need Your Love"	2004	—	—	—	—	—	—	—	6	—	—	Echoes
"Get Myself Into It"	2006	—	37	—	—	—	28	36	—	34	—	Pieces of the People We Love
"Whoo! Alright — Yeah... Uh Huh"	2006	—	—	—	—	—	45	65	—	15	—	Pieces of the People We Love
"Pieces of the People We Love"	2007	—	—	—	—	—	54	148	—	—	—	Pieces of the People We Love
"How Deep Is Your Love?"	2011	14	—	69	—	37	—	—	—	—	—	In the Grace of Your Love
"Sail Away"	2011	—	—	—	—	—	—	—	—	—	—	In the Grace of Your Love
"In the Grace of Your Love"	2012	—	—	—	70	—	—	—	—	—	—	In the Grace of Your Love
"—" denotes releases that did not chart or were not released in that territory.

=== Split singles ===
Single	Year	Other artist
"Killing" / "Give Me Every Little Thing"	2003	The Juan MacLean

== Music videos ==
Title	Year	Director
"House of Jealous Lovers"	2003	Shynola
"Love Is All"		
"Sister Saviour"		Jason Friedman
"Get Myself Into It"	2006	Ben Dickinson
"Whoo! Alright - Yeah...Uh Huh"	2006	Ben Dickinson
"Pieces of the People We Love"	2007	Ben Dickinson & Jon Watts
"Sail Away"	2011	Kris Moyes
"In the Grace of Your Love"	2012	Melissa Jones
"How Deep Is Your Love"	2012	Crystal Moselle

== Other appearances ==
Song	Year	Album
"The Sound"	2007	Need for Speed: ProStreet soundtrack
"No Sex for Ben"	2008	The Music of Grand Theft Auto IV
