= Earthless discography =

The discography of American psychedelic rock band Earthless consists of three studio albums, two live albums, and various miscellaneous releases, including a number of split albums.

Earthless formed in 2001 when its members discovered each other through mutual friends and that they had common interests in music and had similar musical goals. The band released their debut album, Sonic Prayer, in 2005 on independent record label Gravity. Afterwards, Gravity also issued their first live album, Sonic Prayer Jam. Later, Earthless signed with another independent label, Tee Pee Records, and released their second studio album, Rhythms from a Cosmic Sky, in 2007 and their second live album, Live at Roadburn, in 2008. After the release of Live at Roadburn, obligations outside the band led Earthless to go on hiatus; it was not until 2013 that the band released another studio record, From the Ages.

Each album released by the group typically consists of at least two very long instrumental songs. Their first two albums, Sonic Prayer and Rhythms from a Cosmic Sky, followed this pattern (the latter with a bonus cover version of "Cherry Red" by The Groundhogs, a conventionally short song with lyrics and vocals, on the CD edition), but From the Ages had four songs, three of which were over ten minutes long and all of which had no vocals. On its CD edition, Live at Roadburn has one track on each disc, but four songs altogether, as there are no track separations on either disc, representing a typical concert performance from the band.

In general, their albums tend to be well-received, with most criticisms centering on the sheer length of the songs. In particular, From the Ages was cited as one of the best albums of 2013 by a number of publications but the length of its title track (the band's longest yet) was seen as its primary weakness.

== Sonic Prayer ==
Sonic Prayer

Studio album by Earthless
- Released: April 26, 2005
- Genres: Instrumental rock, psychedelic rock
- Length: 41:45
- Label: Gravity Records
- Producer: Matt A.

Earthless chronology
| ''Sonic Prayer'' (2005) | Rhythms from a Cosmic Sky (2007) |

Professional ratings
Review scores
| Source | Rating |
|---|---|
| Allmusic | 4/5 stars |

Sonic Prayer, the band's debut album, was released on April 26, 2005 by Gravity Records. It was recorded at Gravity Studios with producer Matt A. and mixed at Strange Sounds by Gars Wood.

"Flower Travelin' Man" was named in homage to the Japanese psychedelic rock group Flower Travellin' Band, and "Lost in the Cold Sun" as a reference to Cold Sun, an obscure psychedelic rock group from Texas. The band would have made the songs longer than their ultimate length of about twenty minutes but could not because the album was recorded on analog tape; drummer Mario Rubalcaba explained that the tape was not long enough to hold more material than that.

Allmusic reviewer Thom Jurek remarked that "Droning, thudding space jams are Earthless' trip du jour, and they do it shockingly well." He praised Isaiah Mitchell's "stellar" guitar playing, Mario Rubalcaba's "beat-heavy atmospherics", and Mike Eginton's "repetitive, hypnotic" bass lines while noting the Black Sabbath influences in "Lost in the Cold Sun" and calling the album one of the best in the stoner rock genre. The record received the award for Best Hard Rock Album at the 2007 San Diego Music Awards.

Track listing

1. "Flower Travelin' Man" – 20:46
2. "Lost in the Cold Sun" – 20:59

Personnel

Earthless

- Isaiah Mitchell – guitar
- Mike Eginton – bass guitar
- Mario Rubalcaba – drum kit

Additional personnel

- Producer – Matt A.
- Mixed by – Gars Wood
- All album art except for skull – Mike Eginton
- Skull art – R. Sanderson

== Rhythms from a Cosmic Sky ==
Rhythms from a Cosmic Sky

Studio album by Earthless
- Released: May 8, 2007
- Recorded: January 1–4, 2007
- Genres: Instrumental rock, psychedelic rock
- Length: 46:43
- Label: Tee Pee Records
- Producer: Tim Green

Earthless chronology
| Sonic Prayer (2005) | ''Rhythms from a Cosmic Sky'' (2007) | Live at Roadburn (2008) |

Professional ratings
Review scores
| Source | Rating |
|---|---|
| AllMusic | 4.5/5 stars |
| Exclaim! | Favorable |
| PopMatters | 7/10 |
| Stylus Magazine | B− |
| The A.V. Club | Favorable |

Rhythms from a Cosmic Sky, their second studio album, was released on May 8, 2007 by Tee Pee Records, their first album for the label. It consists of two instrumental pieces, with the first track "Godspeed" divided into five suites. The album was recorded and mixed from January 1–4, 2007, at Louder Studios in San Francisco with producer Tim Green and mastered by Dave Gardner at Magneto Mastering in Minneapolis. The CD version also includes a cover version of the Groundhogs' "Cherry Red", which is one of the few songs recorded by Earthless to feature lyrics and vocals; Mitchell sings lead vocals on the track.

The recording process for Rhythms from a Cosmic Sky was rather spontaneous and, because the album was recorded on analog tape (as was Sonic Prayer), the songs were limited to being approximately 20 minutes in length. Rubalcaba later reflected that the band were not able to fully express themselves on this album because of the length restrictions and how often they improvised during recording; he said that not all of what the band were inspired to do could be recorded owing to these limitations.

Critical reaction to the album was mostly positive. Thom Jurek of Allmusic praised Rhythms from a Cosmic Sky, describing the band as "belong[ing] more with the Japanese bands" such as The Stars or Acid Mothers Temple but making favorable comparisons to such acts as Jimi Hendrix, Cream and Humble Pie. He concluded that the band are "a whole other thing in American power rock right now. They point a way that few will be able to follow." Keith Carman, reviewing for Exclaim!, noted that only those with the patience for long songs or those in "altered states of consciousness" could tolerate the album, but described it as "quite the interesting celestial ride". Giving the album a 7 out of 10, PopMatters' Mark W. Adams complimented both the band's long instrumental material and the cover of "Cherry Red", saying the latter demonstrated that they also do well with shorter material. Stylus Magazine stated that "Godspeed" and "Sonic Prayer" suffered from redundancy, as reviewer Charles Robbins said that the group cease to develop the two songs beyond a certain point, but praised the cover of "Cherry Red" and gave the album a B−. The album was nominated for Best Hard Rock Album at the 2007 San Diego Music Awards, at which the band themselves were nominated as Best Hard Rock Artist. In 2009, the A.V. Club named it one of the best metal albums of that decade, describing the material as "something close to the Platonic ideal of heavy rock".

Track listing

All songs written by Earthless except where noted.

1. "Godspeed" – 20:55

a) "Amplified"
b) "Passing"
c) "Trajectory"
d) "Perception"
e) "Cascade"

2. "Sonic Prayer" – 21:12
3. "Cherry Red" (Tony McPhee) – 4:36 (CD edition bonus track)

Personnel

Earthless

- Isaiah Mitchell – guitar
- Mike Eginton – bass guitar
- Mario Rubalcaba – drum kit

Additional personnel

- Tim Green – producer, mixer, organ on "Godspeed"
- Dave Gardner – mastering
- Andy Kman – album design
- Mike Eginton – illustrations

== Live at Roadburn ==
Live at Roadburn

Live album by Earthless
- Released: October 7, 2008
- Recorded: April 18, 2008, Roadburn Festival, Tilburg, Netherlands
- Genres: Instrumental rock, psychedelic rock
- Length: Disc 1: 56:06; Disc 2: 35:13; Total: 1:31:19
- Label: Tee Pee Records
- Producer: Tim Green

Earthless chronology
| Rhythms from a Cosmic Sky (2007) | ''Live at Roadburn'' (2008) | From the Ages (2013) |

Professional ratings
Review scores
| Source | Rating |
|---|---|
| Outburn | (9/10) |
| North Coast Journal | Favorable |
| The Austin Chronicle | 4/4 stars |
| San Diego CityBeat | 7.7/10 |

Live at Roadburn is the band's second live album (behind Sonic Prayer Jam), and their third main album overall, released on October 7, 2008 by Tee Pee Records. It consists of four instrumental pieces spread across two CDs, with no track separations on either disc. The album was recorded at the thirteenth Roadburn Festival in Tilburg, the Netherlands on April 18, 2008, and mastered by Paul Gold at Salt Mastering in Brooklyn. The band were unexpectedly moved to the main stage of the festival and played for almost an hour and a half, to many more people than they had expected. Originally scheduled to play to 250 people in the smallest room of the event as the main act, the band were invited at the last minute to instead perform as the last act on the main stage to 2000 concertgoers, as the scheduled band Isis only performed for half of their two-hour slot. Earthless were not aware the performance had even been recorded, but they had no objection when Tee Pee Records requested they release an album based on the performance, liking the recordings themselves. Rubalcaba described the album as "the most honest representation of [Earthless] that you're gonna get on a record", and said that if listeners did not like the album they would not like the band's shows.

Following the album's release, Earthless continued to tour. In February 2009, they toured with Witch in North America. The band toured in Europe and the UK with Russian Circles in April 2010, in the US in support of Baroness from November to early December, and in Australia for the first time from December 2010 to January 2011. As Earthless toured, band members became increasingly involved with side projects that took priority over Earthless and Mitchell moved to Northern California, reducing their available rehearsal time and causing the act to enter a hiatus. Some of the material recorded on Live at Roadburn was planned for their next studio album, but due to the act's hiatus, such an album would not be released until 2013's From the Ages, six years after Rhythms from a Cosmic Sky.

The song "From the Ages" would not be recorded in a studio until the group began the sessions for the album of the same name, and was titled so by Rubalcaba because he felt the song was "archaic and cave man and sort of ancient". He gave it and "Blue" their names only because the songs needed names for the release of Live at Roadburn.

Critical reaction was mostly positive. Jeff Treppel of Outburn magazine rated the album 9 out of 10, calling it "close to an hour and a half of intensive jammage" and "a hypnotic listening experience". Michael Mannix for the North Coast Journal said Live at Roadburn demonstrated Earthless' greatest strength and driving force – Rubalcaba's drumming, which he said did not always come across on the band's studio albums. He noted that the performance of "From the Ages" was shortened by 10 minutes, and suggested this was done for the sake of the vinyl release, but said that it did not impact the album harmfully. Reviewing for the Austin Chronicle, Raoul Hernandez stated "Blue" is a song "which arrives at Cream's crossroads in three minutes and continues for another 17", and described the album overall, which he rated the full 4 stars out of 4, as "One small step for the San Diego trio, one Hendrix Hail Mary ("Sonic Prayer") for mankind". Rating it 7.7 out of 10, the San Diego CityBeat noted that the album would appeal to death metal fans and Deadheads alike, but it would fail to satisfy those seeking a resolution to the music.

Track listing

All songs written and composed by Earthless.

Disc 1: "Blue"/"From the Ages" – 56:05
Disc 2: "Godspeed"/"Sonic Prayer" – 35:27

Personnel

Earthless

- Isaiah Mitchell – guitar
- Mike Eginton – bass guitar
- Mario Rubalcaba – drum kit

Additional personnel

- Marcel van de Vondervoort – recording, mixing
- Robert de Lorijin – recording
- Jeroen van Donzel – recording
- Paul Gold – mastering
- Jakob Skott – visual effects during the performance
- "Moose" – cover photo
- Mike Eginton – interior artwork
- Andy Kman – album layout

== From the Ages ==
From the Ages, their third full-length studio album, was released on October 8, 2013 by Tee Pee Records. It had been six years since Rhythms from a Cosmic Sky because all three members of Earthless were pre-occupied with other matters, including other bands.

The album comprises four songs, all instrumental, and was recorded in two days. Much of the album's material had existed in the band's live repertoire before – in particular the album's title track had been released in an early form on Live at Roadburn – and the rest of it was created during the recording sessions and rehearsals. Despite the band's preference for analog tape, the title track had to be recorded digitally to accommodate its length.

The album was released to mostly positive critical reaction, with criticisms usually directed at the length of the material (and of the title track in particular) amid praises for its composition and depth. A number of publications cited the album as one of the best 2013 releases on year-end lists. Earthless earned two nominations at the San Diego Music Awards, and From the Ages became the band's second album to win the Best Hard Rock Album award there.

== Split albums ==
| Year | Song | Album | Source |
|---|---|---|---|
| 2008 | "Jull" | Split single with Witch | |
| 2011 | "Woman with the Devil Eye" | Split EP with Danava and Lecherous Gaze | |
| 2012 | "Living in the Cosmic Nod (Improvisations)" | Split LP with Premonition 13 and Radio Moscow | |
| 2013 | "Red" | Split EP with White Hills | |
| 2016 | "Acid Crusher" | Split LP with Harsh Toke | |

== Miscellaneous ==
Between the release of Sonic Prayer and that of Rhythms from a Cosmic Sky, the band released a 10" vinyl live album titled Sonic Prayer Jam on Gravity Records. The band released a limited-edition 7" vinyl single on TYM Records that was initially available only via pre-order and in the color blue, then sold at shows during their December 2012 Australian tour in the color red, and later reissued in the United States in the color purple.

On January 26, 2016, the band were part of Scion A/V Presents the Baker Skateboards EP, contributing the song "End to End".

In addition to Sonic Prayer Jam and Live at Roadburn, the band have released a number of other live recordings, which in fact compose the majority of the band's recorded output. Mitchell has noted that despite the lack of other atmospheric elements such as sights and smells, one still hears the uniqueness of a particular Earthless concert in a recording as no two performances are alike. He further explained, especially with regard to the band's hiatus, "Part of it is because we got some good recordings and we haven't been able to go into the studio, so it's nice to keep putting stuff out and let people know that we're still around. And also when we're on and the communication is good between the three guys in the band, it's a good performance so it'd be a waste not to put that out so that people could hear it."
