= How Great Is Your Love =

How Great Is Your Love may refer to:

- How Great Is Your Love (Sean Ardoin album), 1999
- "How Great Is Your Love", a song by Girl's Generation from The Boys, 2011
- "How Great Is Your Love", a song by MercyMe from Almost There, 2001
- "How Great Is Your Love", a song by Passion featuring Kristian Stanfill, 2017

== See also ==
- How Deep Is Your Love (disambiguation)
