= Gems of Masochism =

1995 studio album by Antioch Arrow

Gems Of Masochism

Studio album by Antioch Arrow
- Released: September 27, 1995
- Recorded: December 1994
- Genres: Post-hardcore, gothic rock, post-punk, emo, no wave
- Length: 24:46
- Label: Amalgamated (AMA 1)
- Producer: Brian Foxworthy

Antioch Arrow chronology
In Love With Jetts (1994)	Gems Of Masochism (1995)

Gems Of Masochism is the third and final studio album by American band Antioch Arrow, which was posthumously released on September 27, 1995 on CD and LP formats by the Amalgamated Recording Corp. The album, musically, shows the band's complete transition from spastic hardcore punk sound to the flat out gothic post-punk style, utilizing instruments such as keyboards.

The album was reissued on CD and LP formats by Three One G in 2003, after being out-of-print for years. Both CD editions of the album came packaged in red-tinted trays, the only difference being that the original 1995 CD issue also had a glittered grey disc tray while the 2003 reissue had a clear black disc tray. Although the album faced negative reception when it was first released, it is now seen as the band's best recording by critics.

== Background and recording ==
Antioch Arrow formed in 1992 in San Diego, California and released their earliest material through the influential local label Gravity Records. The group toured three times in the United States: First during the spring on 1993 across the west coast, then that same year in the summer across the nation, and finally one last time during the summer of 1994, again across the entire country. Their last tour, due to van troubles and lack of interest, was cut short and the band played their last show on July 6, 1994 in Boulder, Colorado on the back of a truck.

By late 1994, the group were offered a recording deal and flew out to Los Angeles, California to record what would become Gems Of Masochism. Recording lasted throughout December of that year, and the album was engineered out at G-Son, Los Angeles with the help of Brian Foxworthy. By the time production for the album was finished, the band officially broke up.

== Reception ==
Professional ratings
Review scores
Source	Rating
Allmusic	4.5/5 stars
Ink 19	Very Favorable
Prefix Magazine	7/10 stars
Scene Point Blank	8/10 stars
Silent Uproar	Very Favorable

According to vocalist Aaron Montaigne, the album faced very poor reception upon initial release. However, the album has since gained a cult following and is seen as one of the best recording by the group by many. As described by fanzine Silent Uproar's review of the album, "Antioch Arrow dismantled, rearranged, and deconstructed everything in the West Coast punk/hardcore scene when they released Gems Of Masochism." Daniel L. Mitchell of Ink 19 simply stated in his review of the album that "Antioch Arrow is historically important." Ned Raggett of Allmusic rewarded the album four and a half stars out of a possible five, stating "without sacrificing any of the awesome power of the earlier releases, Antioch Arrow added new elements of drama and decadence to their work, finding a nexus between musical and lyrical extremity."

== Track listing ==
No.	Title	Length
1.	"Paper Moshay"	1:57
2.	"Too Bad You're Gonna Die"	2:39
3.	"Date With Destiny"	2:32
4.	"David"	1:59
5.	"Dead Now"	3:38
6.	"Gotta Love The Lights"	4:20
7.	"Introducing Elizabeth"	5:53
8.	"Picnic Pants"	1:50
Total length:		24:46

== Personnel ==
- Aaron Montaigne – vocals
- Andy Ward – bass
- Mac Mann – guitar, piano, organ, keyboards
- Myra Powers – vocals
- Ron Anarchy – drums
- Brian Foxworthy – engineering
- Jeff Winterberg – guitar
- Chris Gaffus – guest appearance
- Cassandra Iams – photography
