= The Limits of Control (soundtrack) =

The Limits of Control (Original Motion Picture Soundtrack)

Soundtrack album by various artists
- Released: May 5, 2009
- Length: 53:54
- Label: Lakeshore
- Producer: Jim Jarmusch

The Limits of Control (Original Motion Picture Soundtrack) is the soundtrack album to the 2009 film The Limits of Control directed by Jim Jarmusch. The album accompanied several songs contributed by Jarmusch's band Bad Rabbit, along with the band Boris that composed the film score, Sunn O))) and LCD Soundsystem, amongst others. The soundtrack was released through Lakeshore Records on May 5, 2009.

== Development ==
The soundtrack is a curation of existing music selected by the director Jarmusch. He considered the musical landscape to be "amazing" as it ranged from multiple genres—"space metal, doom, neo-psychedelic stoner sludge". During the edit, Jarmusch listened to the song contributed by the rock band Boris, and had edited it as a temp score. A piece of music called "Fuzzy Reactor" which the band performed in collaboration with guitarist Michio Kurihara of the Stars had "a psychedelic density to it" which led him to put it on repeat while writing the script. He also selected contributions from Sunn O))), LCD Soundsystem, the Black Angels, Earth amongst others.The end product, was an assortment of licensed music as film score, having "a whole file of music to work with in the editing room". For scenes were no suitable music could be found, Jarmusch's own band Bad Rabbit recorded new songs.

Jarmusch admitted that some of the music had inspired some of the editing and the intangible atmosphere, which existed only his in mind. He wanted the music to be woven into the mood of the film, rather than feeling slapped on the surface of the images and considering it "inspiring" on various other levels where "certain qualities [pushed him] forward in an abstract way." Beyond the electronic and metallic soundscape, the film featured a classical composition of Franz Schubert's adagio from String Quintet in C performed by the Ensemble Villa Musica.

While preparing the film in Spain, he researched extensively on the flamenco music, where one of his friends turned him into the peteneras style which was originated in the 14th century. A song from that era "El Que Se Tenga Por Grande" was performed by Carmen Linares for the film, while also featured another version originally performed by Talegón de Córdoba, and featuring guitarist Jorge Rodriguez Padilla. The lyrics from the song "He who thinks he is bigger than the rest must go to the cemetery, there he will see what life really is. It is a handful of dirt, a handful of dust…" was referenced throughout the film. Another flamenco song "Por Compasión: Malagueñas" was also featured in the film, originally performed by Manuel El Sevillano. Jarmusch also mentioned in a dialogue that the guitar which was made during the 1920s for recording the song should also appear in the film.

== Critical reception ==
Kenneth Herzog of AllMusic wrote "As with any soundtrack, it's only half of a collective audio/visual vision, but [The Limits of Control] exceeds the ambition of most cinematic compilations." Rania of IndieWire stated that she "[got] goosebumps thinking of the aural landscape details in the film" praising Jarmusch's eclectic musical selections that provided an array of genres. Dana Stevens of Slate described the soundtrack as "gorgeous". Todd McCarthy of Variety gave a negative review, saying "there's the music, mostly by a Japanese electronic noise outfit called Boris, that drones on ultimately to congeal into a state of undead rigor mortis."

Craig Mathieson of SBS Australia called it "a nocturnal soundtrack of oceanic rock – wordless guitar drones and narcotic beats – that suggest an alternate reality."

== Track listing ==
No.	Title	Artist	Length
1.	"Intro"	Bad Rabbit	0:13
2.	"Fuzzy Reactor"	Boris with Michio Kurihara	3:42
3.	"Saeta"	La Macarena	2:17
4.	"Sea Green Sea"	Bad Rabbit	4:11
5.	"Feedbacker" (TLOC Edit)	Boris	3:32
6.	"Por Compasión: Malagueñas"	Manuel el Sevillano	2:03
7.	"Farewell"	Boris	7:29
8.	"N.L.T."	Sunn O))) & Boris	3:46
9.	"El Que Se Tenga Por Grande"	Carmen Linares	3:21
10.	"Dawn"	Bad Rabbit	1:41
11.	"You on the Run"	The Black Angels	4:50
12.	"Omens and Portents 1: The Driver" (TLOC Edit)	Earth and Bill Frisell	2:44
13.	"El Que Se Tenga Por Grande"	Talegón de Córdoba & Jorge Rodríguez Padilla	3:54
14.	"Blood Swamp" (TLOC Edit)	Sunn O))) & Boris	4:33
15.	"Schubert, Adagio from String Quintet in C, D.956" (TLOC Edit)	Ensemble Villa Musica	5:16
16.	"Daft Punk Is Playing at My House"	LCD Soundsystem	5:15
17.	Untitled (TLOC Edit)	Boris	1:04
Total length:			53:54

== Chart performance ==
Chart (2009)	Peak position
UK Soundtrack Albums (OCC)	44
US Top Soundtracks (Billboard)	11
