= Get Myself Into It =

Single by The Rapture

from the album Pieces of the People We Love
- B-side: Prince Language Disco Edit (7" no. 1); "Shooting Star" (7" no. 2)
- Released: September 4, 2006
- Genre: Dance-punk; funk rock; nu-disco
- Length: 4:40 (album version); 3:41 (radio edit)
- Label: Vertigo; Universal; Schnauzer; Throne of Blood
- Songwriter: The Rapture
- Producers: Paul Epworth; Ewan Pearson

The Rapture singles chronology
"Sister Saviour" (2004)	"Get Myself Into It" (2006)	"Whoo! Alright — Yeah... Uh Huh" (2006)

"Get Myself Into It" is a song by American rock band The Rapture. It was released as the lead single from their second studio album, Pieces of the People We Love, on September 4, 2006. It peaked at number 36 on the UK Singles Chart.

== Track listing ==
=== 7" vinyl ===
- Vertigo — 170 5166-9

Side A
No.	Title	Length
1.	"Get Myself Into It"	4:40

Side B
No.	Title	Length
1.	"Get Myself Into It" (Prince Language Disco Edit)	6:14

- Vertigo — 170 5168-3

Side A
No.	Title	Length
1.	"Get Myself Into It" (Radio edit)	3:41

Side B
No.	Title	Length
1.	"Shooting Star"

=== 12" vinyl ===
- Schnauzer / Throne of Blood — 01 WOOF

Side A
No.	Title	Length
1.	"Get Myself Into It" (SebastiAn Remix)	3:12
2.	"Get Myself Into It" (Serge Santiago Mix)	6:27

Side B
No.	Title	Length
1.	"Get Myself Into It" (Prince Language Disco Edit)	6:14
2.	"Get Myself Into It"	4:40

=== CD ===
- Vertigo – 0-06025-1705165-2

Side B
No.	Title	Length
1.	"Get Myself Into It" (Radio Edit)	3:41
2.	"Crimson Red"	3:48

== Charts ==
Chart (2006)	Peak position
UK Singles (OCC)	36

== Release history ==
Region	Date	Label	Format	Catalogue no.
United Kingdom	September 4, 2006	Vertigo	7"	170 5166-9
United Kingdom	2006	Vertigo	7"	170 5168-3
United Kingdom	November 2006	Schnauzer; Throne of Blood	12"	01 WOOF
United Kingdom	2006	Vertigo	CD	0-06025-1705165-2
