= Heroin (band) =

American screamo band

- Origin: San Diego, California, U.S.
- Genres: Hardcore punk; emocore; post-hardcore; screamo
- Years active: 1989–1993
- Label: Gravity Records
- Past members: Matt Anderson; Scott Bartoloni; Ron Johnson; Aaron Montaigne; Chris Squire

Heroin was an American hardcore punk band formed in San Diego, California, in 1989 within the underground Californian punk scene. They released 17 songs before breaking up in 1993, pioneering the screamo genre.

== History ==
Heroin was a pioneer of the screamo genre. They were noted for the psychological intensity of their songs, which tended to be very short and include extraordinarily fast drumming and screamed vocals. Heroin only released a handful of vinyl EPs and singles, primarily on San Diego record label Gravity Records; the group's debut 7" was also Gravity's first release. These releases were typically packaged in enigmatic ways, such as a sleeve silkscreened onto a Ralphs paper grocery bag. A complete discography was later compiled on the Heroin CD in 1997, also issued on Gravity.

The band split in 1993 after its members decided amicably to move on to other projects. Members went on to play in groups such as Antioch Arrow, Clikatat Ikatowi, and Second Story Window; vocalist Matt Anderson also worked with A Minor Forest, Mohinder, and Angel Hair. Anderson, Bartoloni, and Squire went on to play in legendary San Diego hardcore band Battalion of Saints from 2005 until 2008.

== Legacy ==
Though the group was active for only four years and received little attention during its lifespan, the release of the Gravity compilation and later accolades earned them considerable posthumous acclaim. Geoff Rickly, lead singer of Thursday, named Heroin as one of his major influences. Allmusic called the group "one of the defining innovators in early '90s hardcore". In 2008, Alternative Press named Heroin as a group of significant interest in its profile of "23 Bands who Shaped Punk", writing that "Heroin never received overdue credit for inspiring the aesthetic that Story of the Year, From First to Last and others eventually took to the bank."

Emo subculture and history website Fourfa describes Heroin's self-titled LP as "A wall of furious, chaotic noise, vocal-chord [sic]-shredding screaming, lyrics of ultimate disillusionment and pain, and just the right amount of melody to pull things together without interrupting the flow of angst."

== Members ==
- Matt Anderson – vocals. See also: Rice, Spacehorse, End of the Line, Battalion Of Saints.
- Scott Bartoloni – guitar. See also: Clikatat Ikatowi, End of the Line, Statue, Forced Down, Spacehorse, Battalion of Saints.
- Ron Johnson – bass. See also: Second Story Window.
- Aaron Montaigne – drums. See also: Antioch Arrow, Tarot Bolero, End of the Line, The Chandeliers, Dangerous Boys Club

== Discography ==
- 1991 All About Heroin 7" – (Vinyl Communications)
- 1992 Heroin 7" – (Gravity Records)
- 1993 Heroin 12" – (Gravity Records, Vermiform)
- 1997 Heroin CD – (Gravity Records)
