= James Duncan (musician) =

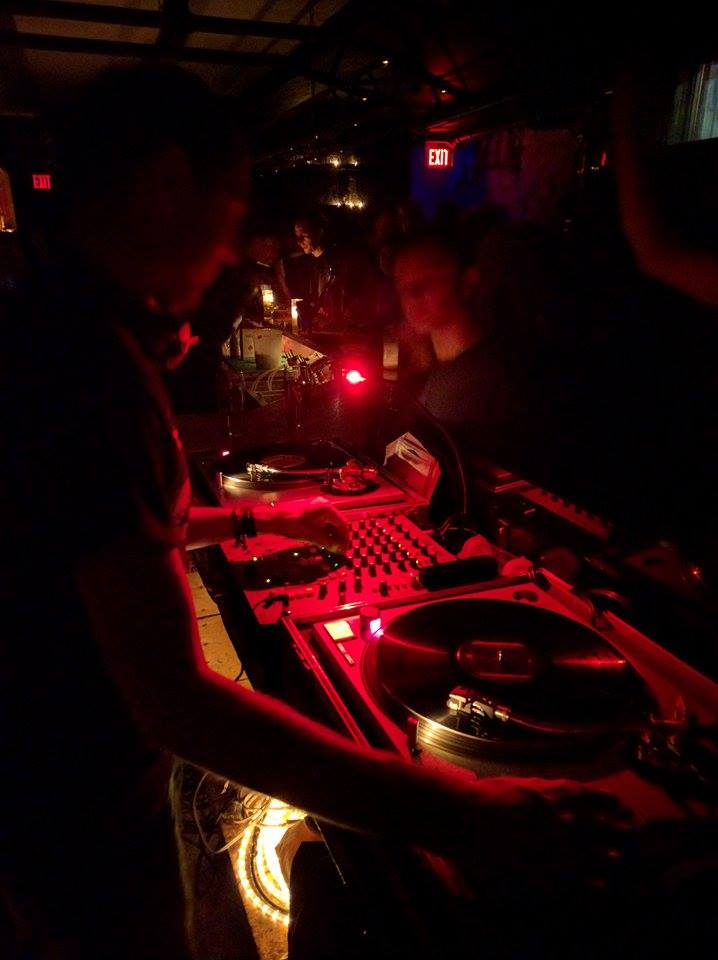
- James Duncan in Toronto 2016

Background information
- Born: November 12, 1968 (age 57); Toronto, Ontario
- Genres: Disco, House Music, Free Jazz
- Occupations: Musician, trumpet player
- Instruments: Trumpet, sampler, guitar
- Years active: 1993–present

James Duncan (born November 12, 1968) is a Canadian musician, producer and trumpet player originally from Toronto, Ontario.

He has recorded and performed as a trumpet player with respected dance music artists Metro Area, Kelley Polar and Morgan Geist, all on Environ Records. He also appeared on The Rapture's "House of Jealous Lovers" 12" single (Morgan Geist Remix) on DFA Records.

Resident Advisor named Metro Area's debut CD, which he played trumpet on, the 2nd Best Album of the 2000s and The Rapture's "House of Jealous Lovers" was rated 16th and 6th respectively on Pitchfork Media and NME's Top Tracks of the 2000s lists. Recently, it was cited by Rolling Stone in their "100 Greatest Songs of the Century - So Far" listing at #73.

An active musician, he has also toured and/or recorded with a wide range of rock, pop and jazz artists such as The Silent League (Mercury Rev//The Arcade Fire/Beirut), Aarktica, Arthur's Landing (a group of collaborators of the late Arthur Russell), Glenn Branca, Rhys Chatham, Marc Edwards (ex-Cecil Taylor), and Fist of Facts (ex-Liquid Liquid singer Sal Principato) among many others. Appearances at concert venues include The Lincoln Center, MOMA's PS1, The Winter Music Conference in Miami, John Zorn's The Stone (New York), Joe's Pub, PS 122 (New York) and The Knitting Factory.

More recently, he appeared on trumpet on a number of releases and remixes by the musical collective Powerdance, led by producer Luke Solomon, who recently won a Grammy Award for his contributions to Beyonce's 2022 album "Renaissance".

As a producer, he has recorded under his own name, releasing solo 12" singles on labels such as Dancetracks (NY), London's Real Soon Records and West Norwood Cassette Library (WNCL) along with Innermoods Records, which he runs out of Brooklyn, NY.
