= House of Jealous Lovers =

2002 single by The Rapture

Single by the Rapture

from the album Echoes
- B-side: "Silent Morning"
- Released: March 2002
- Recorded: 2000–2001
- Studio: Plantain Recording House (New York City)
- Genre: Dance-punk; dance-rock; indie dance
- Length: 5:58
- Label: DFA; Output
- Songwriters: Luke Jenner; Vito Roccoforte; Matt Safer
- Producers: The DFA; The Rapture

The Rapture singles chronology
"The Chair That Squeaks" (1998)	"House of Jealous Lovers" (2002)	"House of Jealous Lovers (re-recording)" (2003)

"House of Jealous Lovers"

Single by the Rapture

from the album Echoes
- B-side: "Alabama Sunshine"; remixes
- Released: August 2003
- Recorded: 2003
- Studio: Plantain Recording House (New York City)
- Genre: Dance-punk; dance-rock; indie dance
- Length: 5:04
- Label: DFA; Vertigo
- Songwriters: Luke Jenner; Vito Roccoforte; Matt Safer
- Producers: The DFA; The Rapture

The Rapture singles chronology
"House of Jealous Lovers (original)" (2002)	"House of Jealous Lovers" (2003)	"Killing" / "Give Me Every Little Thing" (2003)

"House of Jealous Lovers" is a song by American indie rock band the Rapture. It was released as the lead single from their second studio album, Echoes, in March 2002, through DFA Records in the US and Output Recordings in the UK. It was eventually re-released in 2003.

Produced by James Murphy and Tim Goldsworthy of the DFA, the song was designed to market the band through dance music distributors. The accompanying music video for the song is influenced by punk imagery. Upon release, it became DFA's best-selling single and helped re-establish dance-punk. The song received acclaim from music critics and was rated 16th and 6th respectively on Pitchfork and NME's tracks of the decade lists. The song would go on to peak at number 27 on the UK Singles Chart. The song was used in the soundtrack for the video game NBA 2K15, which was curated by famed music producer Pharrell Williams.

== Background and release ==
The Rapture moved from San Francisco to New York in 1999 and wrote "House of Jealous Lovers" the following year. They met James Murphy and Tim Goldsworthy of DFA Records at one of their first performances in New York. Murphy and Goldworthy took a long time to persuade the band to work together because of a concern that making a dance song would alienate their fans.

While mastering "House of Jealous Lovers", Murphy used techno music as a benchmark for the track's bass frequencies. After hearing the DFA's mix, Sub Pop, the band's record label at the time, and the band both reacted negatively and initially refused to release it. Vocalist Luke Jenner hated the mix, feeling that it sounded unfinished. On the way to a gig, Murphy played the mix for Jonathan Galkin; Galkin credited it for his decision to join DFA Records.

The Rapture originally released the song in 2002 as a limited 12" vinyl single, a format preferred by club DJs. The single included a remix by Morgan Geist of Metro Area as the second song on the A-side and a song titled "Silent Morning" as the B-side. The single format and remix were part of a strategy to market the single through dance music stores. A music video for the song, directed by London-based group Shynola, was made and released in 2003. The chaotic, surreal video was inspired by the collage style of old punk fliers. It features footage of the band, animated newspaper headlines, scrapbook paraphernalia, and scenes of military conflicts. Pitchfork listed the video as the 27th best music video of the 2000s.

== Composition ==
"House of Jealous Lovers"
Luke Jenner's strained vocals were described as an "alienated yelp" or "cat-strangle".

"House of Jealous Lovers" is a dance-punk, dance-rock and indie dance song. Its percussion section features disco hi-hat patterns and snare drums doubled with handclaps. The DFA reshaped the percussion by layering and reversing the hi-hats and chopping the drums. The song includes prominent cowbell rhythms that grow louder through the course of the song. Its jagged, coarse guitar is doubled with electronic effects. The sound follows British predecessors such as Gang of Four, Public Image Ltd, and Happy Mondays.

The track opens and closes with long instrumental sections and features lyrics largely consisting of the song's title being repeated. Jenner said he was unsure of the subject of the song and wanted to project a sense of "invincibility". His performance, described as a "deranged falsetto", drew comparisons to the vocals of the Cure's frontman Robert Smith. Geist's remix removes the vocals and adds keyboard riffs. It introduces brass sections, performed by James Duncan, to the arrangement.

== Critical reception ==
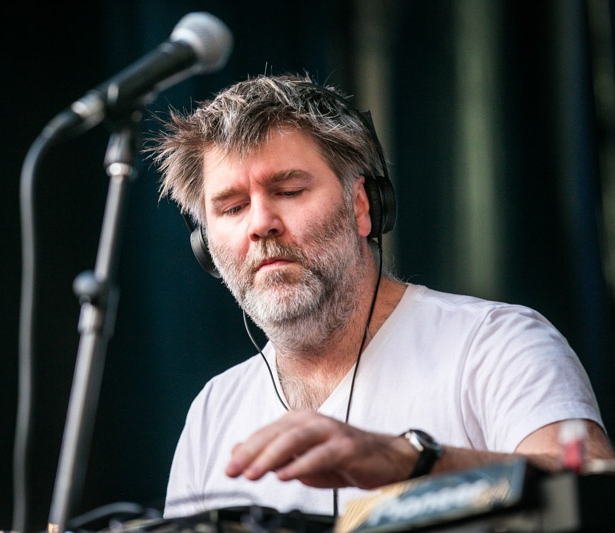
James Murphy co-produced the song.

"House of Jealous Lovers" received acclaim from music critics. Stylus Magazine described the track as all four band members "playing their instruments as if they were leads" and continued that "nobody's been able to pull this off so well since Joy Division". AllMusic said that its rhythm section was "as dynamite as anything from the late-'70s U.K. post-punk bands." Pitchfork called the song "the unparalleled champion of 2002's summer anthem sweepstakes".

The song placed 9th on the 2002 Pazz & Jop list, and it appeared at 26th place the following year. Stylus Magazine and Spin each named it the 9th best single of 2002. Pitchfork ranked "House of Jealous Lovers" 4th on its 2003 singles list.

Pitchfork placed the song 16th on its "500 best tracks of the 2000s" list. Rolling Stone ranked the song 53rd on its list of the best songs of the 2000s, and Slant Magazine placed it at 45th. The NME listed the song sixth on its 2000s list. In October 2011, NME placed the song at number 86 on its list "150 Best Tracks of the Past 15 Years". Pitchfork included "House of Jealous Lovers" in its 2006 collection of The Pitchfork 500. The Guardian listed the track in its "1000 songs everyone must hear".

== Impact ==
"House of Jealous Lovers" became DFA's best-selling single, and the label sold 20,000 vinyl copies of it. The single reached number 27 on the UK Singles Chart in September 2003.

The song's use in dance sets opened rock music for formats other than concerts. It has been credited for re-establishing dance-punk during a period when rock and dance music rarely intersected. Justin Timberlake and Timbaland have cited "House of Jealous Lovers" as an influence on their 2006 single "SexyBack". Timberlake used the song for an entrance during his FutureSex/LoveShow tour.

== Track listing ==
=== 2002 release ===
12-inch vinyl (dfa 2121)
No.	Title	Length
1.	"House of Jealous Lovers"	5:58
2.	"House of Jealous Lovers" (Morgan Geist version)	5:44

No.	Title	Length
1.	"Silent Morning"	6:43

=== 2003 release ===
7-inch vinyl (Vertigo 981112-5)
No.	Title	Length
1.	"House of Jealous Lovers"	3:40

No.	Title	Length
1.	"Alabama Sunshine"	2:48

CD1
No.	Title	Length
1.	"House of Jealous Lovers"	3:40
2.	"Alabama Sunshine"	2:48
3.	"House of Jealous Lovers" (Maurice Fulton remix)	8:59

CD2
No.	Title	Length
1.	"House of Jealous Lovers"	5:06
2.	"House of Jealous Lovers: Cosmos vs. the Rapture" (Tom Middleton remix)	6:54
3.	"Killing" (Ends remix)	3:54

== Charts ==
Chart (2003)	Peak position
UK Singles (Official Charts)	27

== Release history ==
Region	Date	Label	Format	Catalogue no.
United States	March 2002	DFA	12"	dfa 2121
United Kingdom	2003	Vertigo	7"	981112-5
