= From the Ages =

Studio album by Earthless
- Released: October 8, 2013
- Genre: Instrumental rock, psychedelic rock
- Length: 1:05:31
- Label: Tee Pee Records
- Producer: Phil Manley

Earthless chronology
Live at Roadburn (2008)	From the Ages (2013)

From the Ages is the third full-length studio album by American rock band Earthless. It was released on October 8, 2013 by Tee Pee Records. It had been six years since the band’s last full-length studio album, Rhythms from a Cosmic Sky, as all three members of Earthless were pre-occupied with other matters, including other bands.

The album comprises four songs, all instrumental, and was recorded in two days. Much of the album’s material had existed in the band’s live repertoire before – in particular the album's title track had been released in an early form on the band's 2008 live album Live at Roadburn – and the rest of it was created during the recording sessions and rehearsals. Despite the band's preference for analog tape, the title track had to be recorded digitally to accommodate its length.

The album was released to mostly positive critical reaction, with criticisms usually directed at the length of the material (and of the title track in particular) amid praises for its composition and depth. A number of publications cited the album as one of the best 2013 releases on year-end lists. Earthless earned two nominations at the San Diego Music Awards, and From the Ages became the band’s second album to win the Best Hard Rock Album award there.

== Background and recording ==
Earthless' last studio album, Rhythms from a Cosmic Sky, had come out in 2007, and their live album Live at Roadburn (on which an early version of "From the Ages" was recorded) in 2008; further releases had been delayed since then as members of Earthless were becoming increasingly pre-occupied with other matters. Constant touring in 2008 and 2009 kept the band out of the studio, drummer Mario Rubalcaba began playing with Off! and guitarist Isaiah Mitchell became involved with Howlin' Rain. Mitchell also moved to northern California, which reduced the available time to rehearse with Earthless (who are based in San Diego). After three rehearsals, the band recorded the album in two days, recording much of it live the first day and additional details the following day, in San Francisco with producer Phil Manley in his studio, Lucky Cat Recording.

== Song information ==
The songs on the album began as "very loose, general ideas" according to Rubalcaba, who also said "Violence of the Red Sea" was the most organized, structured song on the album (although he later said the same of the title track). Eginton wrote the bass lines for "Violence of the Red Sea", inspired by funk and "prog-psych" bands from the UK and Europe. The song, which had been included in the band's concert setlist for the last few years prior to recording, was named after the combination of riffs and tempos which "collid[ed] together like an angry sea". The song's finale was present in the band's repertoire for almost a decade and was used to close the song for the tension it created, whereas the opening of the song was considered more of a "laid back groove". After Rubalcaba and Eginton had outlined the song's bass guitar and drum parts in Mitchell's absence (due to now living elsewhere), Mitchell was allowed to improvise lead guitar over them when he was able to play with the duo.

"Uluru Rock" was named after the Uluru rock formation in Australia, as an homage to the country, and was written by Mitchell and Eginton through improvisations while they waited for Rubalcaba to get on stage to begin the band's first show in the country At the time the band had not been to the landmark. As a tribute to the natives, the song was specifically named Uluru as opposed to Ayers Rock, the landmark's other official name. "Uluru Rock" became the opening song on the band's setlist for all shows thereafter.

"Equus October" was born out of a song that the band were considering discarding because they were never able to finish it until they entered the studio and changed their minds, wanting more material on the album. They decided to use a riff from it only as an interlude that ran 30 seconds long, but they came up with more ideas about what to do with it during the mixing process, eventually increasing the length of the song. Rubalcaba explained that the bass guitar line remained a constant fixture on jam sessions between himself and Eginton, and they decided to give it a chance by recording it at the album's sessions. Once Mitchell also began adding material to the song, Rubalcaba felt it started taking on a "strong & majestic yet mournful" sensation, almost as if it were about a ritualistic sacrifice. He later discovered the ritual of the October Horse and based the song's title on that of the ritual. "It took on the feeling I had about the jam & how it just completely comes crashing down so abruptly at the end," he explained. Expanding the song in the studio led the group to want to use it as an interlude that leads into the album's title track.

"From the Ages" was recorded for the band's live album Live at Roadburn five years before and, being very long, was described by Rubalcaba as "a bastard to play [and relearn]". The band wanted to record it in as few takes as possible in spite of its length, which they addressed by recording the song in Pro Tools as they expected it could be up to forty minutes long; in the past they used analog tape which only allowed for about twenty minutes of music but, according to Rubalcaba, yielded the best recording quality. Earthless rehearsed "From the Ages" for three days before recording it in about three takes. In the last five minutes of the song, the band very gently ease into the end, to avoid having to end the song abruptly. Although he had said the same of "Violence of the Red Sea" with respect to the album itself in a previous interview, Rubalcaba later described "From the Ages" as the most organized, planned song the band had yet ever recorded, let alone recorded for this album. He described the mixture of influences in the song as "A supreme psycho-delic buffet served up with all the sour Kraut, all the freshest sushi Japan has to offer & what not". Rubalcaba reiterated the "pre-historic, caveman, dry & mysterious wasteland feel" that inspired the title. The song expanded constantly during rehearsals and evolved after its debut on Live at Roadburn.

== Release and reception ==
Professional ratings
Aggregate scores
Source	Rating
Metacritic	84/100
Review scores
Source	Rating
PopMatters	8 out of 10
Pitchfork Media	7.2/10
Exclaim!	8/10
eMusic	4.5/5 stars
NOW Magazine	4/5 stars
About.com	4/5
Rolling Stone	Favorable
Magnet	Favorable
The Austin Chronicle	4/4 stars

From the Ages was released on October 8, 2013, by Tee Pee Records. The artwork was created by artist Alan Forbes, whose work Rubalcaba commended as "captur[ing] [the phrase "From the Ages"] to a T".

From the Ages charted at #25 on the Billboard Heatseekers chart for a week. Critical reaction to the album was largely positive, though the album's length was commonly cited as a minor flaw. Metacritic reported a score of 84 based on five reviews, indicating "Universal acclaim". "Though the silence may have been deafening for their small but devoted cadre of fans, the wait was worth every moment," wrote Erik Highter for PopMatters, who described the chemistry between the band members as "near telepathic connections between the players" and the roles of Eginton and Rubalcaba as "pulling" Mitchell back from potential unrestrained solos. He rated the album 8 out of 10, his only complaint being that listeners may consider the title track too long. Conversely, Grayson Currin of Pitchfork Media said that the rhythm section did not serve to restrain Mitchell at times, but to "instead follow his ecstatic lead everywhere, fellow travelers on his odyssey of enthusiasms". He echoed Highter's opinion with respect to the title track's length, calling it "the one moment [on the album] where the band's patience might test your own" and asked, regarding the length and repetitive nature of the album as a whole, "is there a need for an hour of three dudes tracing and retracing a melody?" The length of "From the Ages" was also criticized by Exclaim! reviewer Trystan MacDonald who cited it as the record's "only flaw" and rated the album overall 8 out of 10.

eMusic contributor Dan Epstein rated the album 4.5 stars out of 5 and described the interaction between band members similarly to Highter and Currin, saying that, while Mitchell's guitar leads are prominent, Eginton and Rubalcaba are "locked-in" with him and each other, "never los[ing] focus or intensity for a second — not even during the rolling 30-minute title track." In his review for NOW Magazine, John Semley said that while inferior to Rhythms from a Cosmic Sky, the high point was the opening track, "Violence of the Red Sea", and the album is "an essential record for anyone who likes the sound of guitars sounding like guitars". Karen A. Mann also wrote, for the heavy metal section of About.com, that the opening track was the band's peak performance on the album, which she rated 4 out of 5. Rolling Stone referred to the album as one of the 20 best metal albums of 2013, while Magnet named it the third best of the year's top ten hard rock releases. Likewise, the Austin Chronicle ranked it ninth in the top ten metal releases of 2013, and later reviewer Raoul Hernandez gave the album a perfect four-star review. Earthless were again nominated for Best Hard Rock Artist at the 2013 San Diego Music Awards, and the record won the 2014 award for Best Hard Rock Album, becoming the band's second record to do so (their debut Sonic Prayer won the award in 2007).

In support of the album, Earthless toured the west coast of the United States in October 2013, with the Shrine in Australia from December 2013 to January 2014, and the east coast of the US in August 2014. They also embarked on a tour of Europe that fall. The band had planned a tour of Japan with Eternal Elysium, but were forced to cancel the engagement to tend to ill family members; they rescheduled it for January 2015.

== Track listing ==
All music is composed by Earthless.

No.	Title	Length
1.	"Violence of the Red Sea"	14:46
2.	"Uluru Rock"	14:08
3.	"Equus October"	5:42
4.	"From the Ages"	30:55
Total length:		65:31

== Personnel ==
=== Earthless ===
- Isaiah Mitchell – guitar
- Mike Eginton – bass guitar
- Mario Rubalcaba – drum kit

=== Additional personnel ===
Credits taken from the album's liner notes.

- Phil Manley – producer, mixer
- Isaiah Mitchell – mixer
- Mario Rubalcaba – mixer
- Carl Saff – mastering
- Alan Forbes – cover art
- Mike Eginton – inside art
- Ake Arndt – album layout
- Operation Mindblow – liquid overlays

== Chart positions ==
Chart (2013)	Peak position
US Heatseekers (Billboard)	25
