= Earthless =

American rock band

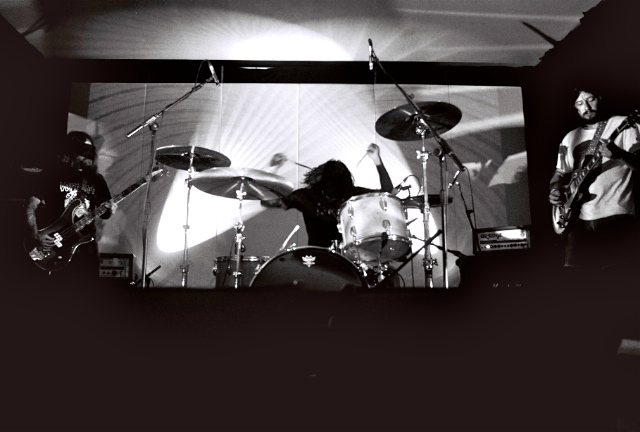
- From left to right: Mike Eginton, Mario Rubalcaba, Isaiah Mitchell

Background information
- Origin: San Diego, California, U.S.
- Genres: Psychedelic rock; stoner metal; blues rock; hard rock; acid rock; occult rock
- Years active: 2001–present
- Labels: Gravity; Tee Pee; Nuclear Blast; Heavy Psych Sounds; Giant Rock
- Members: Isaiah Mitchell; Mike Eginton; Mario Rubalcaba

Earthless is a mostly instrumental psychedelic rock band from San Diego, California, consisting of guitarist and occasional vocalist Isaiah Mitchell, bassist Mike Eginton and drummer Mario Rubalcaba.

The band formed in 2001 and released their first album, Sonic Prayer, through Gravity Records in 2005. Their second album, Rhythms from a Cosmic Sky, was released in 2007 through Tee Pee Records.

Mitchell sings occasionally, but the band's music is mostly instrumental and features long semi-improvised songs drawing on classic rock, psychedelic rock, metal, blues rock, jazz, and krautrock.

== History ==
=== Formation and early years ===
Drummer Mario Rubalcaba moved back to his native San Diego to join Rocket from the Crypt, and eventually encountered future Earthless bassist Mike Eginton. Guitarist Isaiah Mitchell had been playing with a band called Lions of Judah when he met Eginton. Mitchell, Eginton and Rubalcaba discovered they all enjoyed Japanese psychedelic rock and German krautrock.

Eginton suggested the name Earthless, inspired by a song titled likewise by a 1960s American rock group called the Druids of Stonehenge. The trio accepted the name for its "psychedelic ring" and ambiguity. They had already been together for at least three months without a name, for five rehearsal sessions and one live perforamance. At the group's earliest rehearsal, they played songs from Led Zeppelin and Black Sabbath interspersed between lengthy improvisations; at their second session the band only played their own material. They played their first live show together at the Casbah, a venue in their native San Diego, but in general they found it difficult to come together for rehearsals or shows owing to Rubalcaba also playing drums for Rocket from the Crypt. He also played in Hot Snakes, but after both groups disbanded, Rubalcaba and his Earthless bandmates had more free time to devote to their new project.

Earthless' debut album, Sonic Prayer, was released in 2005 and won the 2007 Best Hard Rock Album award at the San Diego Music Awards, where their second album, Rhythms from a Cosmic Sky, was also nominated for the same award and the band themselves were nominated for Best Hard Rock Artist.

=== Live at Roadburn and hiatus (2008–2011) ===
Earthless performed at the thirteenth Roadburn Festival in Tilburg, Netherlands on April 18, 2008. They were originally only scheduled to play to 250 people in the smallest room of the event as the main act, but were invited at the last minute to perform as the last act on the main stage to 2000 concertgoers instead, as the scheduled band Isis had only performed for half of their two-hour slot. Earthless performed for about an hour and a half, and were not aware the performance had been recorded, but did not object when Tee Pee Records requested they release an album based on the performance, liking the recordings themselves. The result was released on October 7, 2008, as Live at Roadburn, which Rubalcaba described as "the most honest representation of [Earthless] that you're gonna get on a record". He said that if listeners did not like the album they would not like to see the band perform live.

In February 2009, Earthless toured with Witch in North America. The band toured in Europe and the UK with Russian Circles in April 2010, in the US in support of Baroness from November to early December, and in Australia for the first time from December 2010 to January 2011.

As the band members continued with their rigorous touring schedule, they became increasingly involved with side projects (Rubalcaba with Off! and Mitchell with Howlin' Rain) and Mitchell moved to Northern California, which reduced the available time to rehearse as Earthless, much less record another studio album (even though some of the material on Live at Roadburn was intended for the next album). As an act, Earthless eventually entered into a period of inactivity by default, but not by intention.

=== Touring and From the Ages (2012–present) ===
After two years of not touring, Earthless came to Australia for a series of concerts in December 2012, and released a limited edition vinyl single to coincide with the tour. Earthless were again nominated for Best Hard Rock Artist at the 2013 San Diego Music Awards, and From the Ages won their second Best Hard Rock Album award the following year.

Earthless toured in support of From the Ages along the western coast of the United States in October 2013, and with the Shrine in Australia from December 2013 to January 2014, and the east coast of the US in August 2014. They are embarking on a tour of Europe in October 2014, and have rescheduled a tour of Japan with Eternal Elysium that Earthless had to cancel to tend to ill family members; the tour will take place in January 2015.

In 2016 Earthless, together with Harsh Toke, released a split-record each with a single track on it.

On March 16, 2018, the band released their album 'Black Heaven'.

== Musical style ==
Earthless consider themselves most strongly influenced by krautrock and psychedelic bands from Japan. Eginton has identified such Japanese groups as Blues Creation, Flower Travellin' Band, High Rise and White Heaven as being inspirational for Earthless, and for krautrock, Rubalcaba has named Guru Guru and Amon Düül II. Classic rock has also influenced the group, as they also share an interest in Led Zeppelin and Black Sabbath. Eginton has also said the earlier work of Miles Davis has impacted the band, along with other modal jazz players, as the band often choose a key or mode for their lenghty songs, and rarely change from that mode no matter how the song develops.

Although typically labeled a stoner rock group, they reject the term, and the band have stated they do not use marijuana. The band's members have a preference fror strong cofee, or iced tea.

The band alternate between writing their songs in advance and improvising them on the spot, repeatedly playing the improvised parts in their live set to the point that the parts become features of the song. Rubalcaba has noted the distinction between improvisation and jamming: he argues that improvisation differs from jamming in that improvisation is more focused and has a purpose, while jamming does not.

As Earthless are primarily an instrumental band, although Mitchell sings on a few songs. "Cherry Red" by British blues group The Groundhogs is regularly performed as an encore with Mitchell's lead vocal, and he also sings on the original song "Woman with the Devil Eye". Earthless do not intend to hire a full-time vocalist, despite all the offers they have received over the years.

== Personnel ==
- Isaiah Mitchell – guitars, vocals (2001–present)
- Mike Eginton – bass (2001–present)
- Mario Rubalcaba – drums (2001–present)

== Discography ==
=== Studio albums ===
- Sonic Prayer (2005)
- Rhythms from a Cosmic Sky (2007)
- From the Ages (2013)
- Acid Crusher/Mount Swan (2016)
- Black Heaven (2018)
- Night Parade of One Hundred Demons (2022)

=== Live albums ===
- Live at Roadburn (2008)
- Live at Freak Valley (2015)
- Live at Tym Guitars, Brisbane Australia (2015)
- From the West (2018)
- Live in the Mojave Desert: Volume 1 (2021)
