= How Deep Is Your Love? (The Rapture song) =

Single by The Rapture

from the album In the Grace of Your Love
- B-side: "Remixes"
- Released: June 13, 2011
- Recorded: 2010–2011
- Genre: Alternative dance; nu-disco
- Length: 6:27
- Label: DFA
- Songwriter(s): Gabriel Andruzzi; Luke Jenner; Vito Roccoforte
- Producer(s): Phillipe Zdar

The Rapture singles chronology
"Pieces of the People We Love" (2007)	"How Deep Is Your Love?" (2011)

"How Deep Is Your Love?" is a song by American dance-punk band The Rapture. It was initially released as the lead single from the band's third studio album In the Grace of Your Love on June 13, 2011, as a single-sided 12-inch single through DFA Records. The song was remixed by Emperor Machine, as part of Adult Swim's 2011 Singles Program. The song peaked at number 19 on the Belgian Flanders Tip singles chart.

== Music video ==
The official music video for the song, using a shorter edit of the song lasting only three minutes and forty-five seconds, was uploaded on April 24, 2012, to the official YouTube channel for Noisey, the music subsidiary for the magazine Vice.

== Track listing ==
=== 12" releases ===
- dfa 2298

Side A
No.	Title	Length
1.	"How Deep Is Your Love?"	6:27

- dfa 2304

Side A
No.	Title	Length
1.	"How Deep Is Your Love?"	6:27

Side B
No.	Title	Length
1.	"How Deep Is Your Love?" (Emperor Machine Remix (Extended Play))	11:15

- dfa 2321

Side A
No.	Title	Length
1.	"How Deep Is Your Love?" (A-Trak Remix (Dub For Mehdi))	6:26

Side B
No.	Title	Length
1.	"How Deep Is Your Love?" (Populette Remix)	10:00

=== Digital downloads ===
Adult Swim Singles Program 2011
No.	Title	Length
1.	"How Deep Is Your Love?" (Emperor Machine Remix Edit)	5:02

iTunes release
No.	Title	Length
1.	"How Deep Is Your Love?"	6:27

Remix EP
No.	Title	Length
1.	"How Deep Is Your Love?" (Emperor Machine Extended Play)	11:15
2.	"How Deep Is Your Love?" (Emperor Machine Extended Play Dub)	10:38
3.	"How Deep Is Your Love?" (Populette Remix)	10:00
4.	"How Deep Is Your Love?" (A-Trak Remix)	6:27
5.	"How Deep Is Your Love?" (A-Trak Remix Dub)	7:10

== Charts ==
Chart (2011)	Peak position
Belgium (Ultratip Bubbling Under Flanders)	19
Mexico Ingles Airplay (Billboard)	37

== Release history ==
Region	Date	Label	Format	Catalogue no.
United States	June 13, 2011	DFA	12"	dfa 2298
United States	July 19, 2011	Adult Swim	Digital download (remix)	—
United States	July 25, 2011	DFA	12"	dfa 2304
United States	July 26, 2011	DFA	Digital download	—
United States	September 27, 2011	DFA	Digital download (remix EP)	—
United States	December 5, 2011	DFA	12"	dfa 2321
