= How Deep Is Your Love =

How Deep Is Your Love or How Deep Is Your Love? may refer to:

- "How Deep Is Your Love" (Bee Gees song), 1977, covered by Take That
- "How Deep Is Your Love" (Keith Sweat song), 1987
- "How Deep Is Your Love" (Dru Hill song), 1998
- "How Deep Is Your Love?" (The Rapture song), 2011
- "How Deep Is Your Love" (Sean Paul song), 2012
- "How Deep Is Your Love" (Calvin Harris and Disciples song), 2015
- "How Deep Is Your Love", a 1992 song by Thomas Anders
