= Metro Area (album) =

Studio album by Metro Area
- Released: October 22, 2002
- Recorded: 1999–2002
- Genre: House
- Length: 1:11:30
- Label: Source, Environ
- Producer: Morgan Geist; Darshan Jesrani

Metro Area chronology
Metro Area (2002)	Fabric 43 (2008)

Professional ratings
Review scores
Source	Rating
AllMusic	5/5 stars
Muzik	4/5 stars
Now	5/5
Pitchfork	7.8/10
Q	3/5 stars
Resident Advisor	5/5
Rolling Stone	3/5 stars
Uncut	4/5 stars

Metro Area is the 2002 debut studio album by American house music group Metro Area.

== Release ==
Metro Area was released on CD and LP (Note: The album was released on 3LP and 2LP variations.) on October 22, 2002 by Source and Environ. and re-released digitally, on LP, and on 200 limited cassette tape copies on October 27, 2017. It was named the second best album of the decade by Resident Advisor. Fact magazine rated it as the nineteenth best album of the decade.

== Track listing ==
All tracks are written by Morgan Geist and Darshan Jesrani.

Standard edition (15th anniversary reissue) (Note: Releases before the 15th anniversary reissue replace "Evidence" with a 32 second intro for the album.)
No.	Title	Length
1.	"Dance Reaction"	6:11
2.	"Miura"	6:47
3.	"Piña"	6:05
4.	"Square-Pattern Aura"	5:36
5.	"Machine Vibes"	5:23
6.	"Evidence"	4:44
7.	"Atmosphrique"	6:32
8.	"Soft Hoop"	4:47
9.	"Let's Get..."	6:24
10.	"Orange Alert"	5:39
11.	"Strut"	5:34
12.	"Caught Up"	7:37
Total length:		71:30

Double album version
No.	Title	Length
1.	"Orange Alert"	5:39
2.	"Caught Up"	7:37
3.	"Miura"	6:47
4.	"Soft Hoop"	4:47
5.	"Evidence"	4:44
6.	"Square-Pattern Aura"	5:36
7.	"Machine Vibes"	5:39
8.	"Atmosphrique"	6:32
Total length:		47:54

== Personnel ==
- Ana Dane – flute on track 5 and 6
- Craig Hillelson – guitar on track 6 and 9
- James Duncan – horns on track 10
- Morgan Geist – producer
- Darshan Jesrani – producer
- Kelley Polar Quartet – strings on track 1, 2 and 12
- Jamie Krents – bass on track 8
- Dei Lewison – vocals, vox organ on track 2
- Dan Selzer – design
- Dee Silk – guitar on track 1 and 3
- Itis Tandoor – percussion on track 3, 4, 8, 11 and 12
