= Nu-disco =

Disco-associated dance music genre

- Stylistic origins: Disco; Euro disco; Italo disco; post-disco; French house; funky house; disco house
- Cultural origins: Mid-1990s, United Kingdom

Nu-disco is a 21st-century dance music genre associated with a renewed interest in the late 1970s disco, synthesizer-heavy 1980s European dance music styles, and early 1990s electronic dance music. The genre was popular in the early 2000s, and experienced a mild resurgence in the 2010s.

There are several scenes associated with the nu-disco term. The original scene is characterized as house music fused with disco elements (sometimes incorrectly referred to as disco house), and disco-influenced balearic music, also known as balearic beat revival or balearica.

Nu-disco is often confused with the other disco-influenced house music genres, such as French house or disco house. French house usually features various special effects, such as phasers and has heavily sample-based production, compared to the usually programmed or live original instrumentation that nu-disco relies on. The other key difference is in the song structure — nu-disco usually has a typical song structure of a pop or classic disco song, with multiple breakdowns, and often with verses and a chorus, whereas disco house generally has a more constant and unvaried character throughout the composition, as does most of house music.

== History ==
=== Disco edits: 1970s–early 1990s ===
Disco edits or re-edits emerged at the same time as disco appeared in the early 1970s, when DJs were looking for ways to make music easier to mix. A disco edit is a modified version of the original master, edited by disco and house DJs to extend and emphasize the best and most dance-friendly elements. For example, Todd Terje's edit of the Bee Gees hit "You Should Be Dancing" does exactly that, downplaying the old-school vocal riffs in favour of driving bass, lively percussion, and an overall sense of space.

In the early days, edits were done with scissors and tape. Some edits became even more popular than the original records from which they were derived. The early editors (such as Walter Gibbons) earned a reputation and developed a studio career from their editing work. Given the popularity of edits, labels predominantly releasing edits and remixes began to appear. The first one to arrive was Disconet in 1977, followed by well-known DJ edits services and labels such as Hot Tracks, Rhythm Stick and Razormaid. Such labels remained active until the first half of the 1990s, when an increase of copyright enforcement gradually put them out of business. However, the scene's activity didn't fade away, it went underground, where many disco edit labels continue to exist today, such as Brooklyn's influential Razor-N-Tape.

=== Emergence of nu-disco: mid-1990s–late 1990s ===
The early developments of the genre are linked with the Black Cock Records, disco edits label, primarily active in 1993–1998, founded by DJ Harvey and Gerry Rooney. The label was focused on releasing non-official re-edits of disco tracks and some funk-influenced rock. It was not the only existing disco edits bootleg label in the 1990s, but had a huge impact on a generation of house music producers, inspiring many in digging decadent genre and adjusting their own house music productions with disco-sounding elements.

In the mid-1990s Nuphonic Records was the house label for British artists Idjut Boys, Faze Action, Raj Gupta and Crispin J Glover, which are considered to be the pioneers of nu-disco. The Idjut Boys, best known for pioneering a house music style called "disco-dub" were heavily inspired by the freestyle and dub-influenced, post-disco dance sounds of the early 1980s. Faze Action were one of the first house production units to make "all live" productions that insisted on drawing on methods used in disco. DJ Dave Lee aka Joey Negro and Crazy P are also called to be the pioneers of the genre.

In 1997, DJ I-F released the track Space Invaders Are Smoking Grass, a track based around electro-funk drum patterns, 80s FM synth stabs and vocoder vocals, that single-handedly started the electroclash movement, and brought melodic, European sounding electro-disco back to clubs and DJ sets. In 1999, I-F released the first of his "Mixed Up In The Hague" mixes, made up almost entirely of Italo disco and Eurodisco, which became hugely influential.

=== Mainstream success, French house and disco house synonym: late 1990s–mid-2000s ===
In the late 1990s to early 2000s, disco-inspired dance genres became popular; many French house, funky house, and disco house songs broke into the charts. Popular tracks such as Kylie Minogue's "Love at First Sight", Sophie Ellis-Bextor's "Take Me Home" and "Murder on the Dancefloor", Madonna's "Hung Up", Jamiroquai's "Little L", and Freemasons "Love on My Mind" all made the top ten of the UK Singles Chart. By this time, the nu-disco scene was heavily associated with disco house and French house.

The moniker "nu-disco" first appeared in print in a 1996 XLR8R Magazine interview with Chicago house artist Cajmere, written by DJ and music journalist Christopher Orr. The Independent described nu-disco as the result of applying "modern technology and pin-sharp production" to 1970s disco and funk. Metro Area's self-titled album, released in 2002, is often regarded as one of the most influential albums in the genre. The album named the second best album of the decade by Resident Advisor and the best nineteenth of the decade by Fact magazine. In the early 2000s the genre was a dance music mainstay, right until the mid-2000s when electro house gained commercial success, leaving nu-disco in decline from mainstream and pushing it to further development.

=== Decline in popularity and development: mid-2000s–late 2000s ===
In the 2000s, nu-disco gained a new sound, which was developed in various local scenes:

- Norwegian disco, a fusion of space disco with nu-disco, notable artists are Lindstrøm, Prins Thomas and Todd Terje.
- Balearica or Balearic beat revival, a European scene, highly influenced by Balearic house, mostly presented by Belgian act Aeroplane and other European producers.
- European synth-driven nu-disco, influenced by Italo disco, 1980s synth-pop and new wave, pioneered by Lifelike and Kris Menace, the scene later outgrew into synthwave movement.
- The Australian scene, which crosses boundaries with indietronica and indie dance, notable artists are Miami Horror and Bag Raiders.

In July 2008, Beatport added genre category "Nu Disco / Indie Dance", stating that nu-disco is "everything that springs from the late '70s and early '80s (electronic) disco, boogie, cosmic, Balearic and Italo disco continuum". Originally, service associated it with re-edits of classic disco records and a handful of European electronic producers who made music in that style. It was used alongside alternative dance up until September 2019, when Beatport separated categories into two, leaving nu-disco in "Nu Disco / Disco".

In 2008, Spin magazine stated that disco is experiencing a worldwide renaissance, with a flowering of new labels, compilations, and club nights, calling the disco of the 21st century seedy, underground, and punk in attitude. The magazine pointed that Eurodisco sound, including instrumental space disco and the late-1970s—early-1980s Italo disco, was the main influence on the nu-disco scene of that time.

Tensnake's single "Coma Cat" hit the European charts in 2010 and was one of the most successful nu-disco tracks of that time.

=== Back to mainstream: early 2010s–present ===
In the early 2010s, bands such as Metronomy, Hercules & Love Affair and Friendly Fires started using nu-disco elements in their songs, bringing nu-disco back to mainstream popularity and critical acclaim. Nu-disco artists Aeroplane and Soulwax became massively influential and have been released on major labels, while other producers are commissioned anonymously to work for pop acts. Steve Kotey, a member of cult band Chicken Lips, said in 2012:

"30 percent of music in the charts have the feeling of this left-field disco production style in it. The producers give it that kind of shine that makes it more for radio than your DJ box. You can hear the electronic Chicken Lips stuff that was prevalent in 2003 in some of Lady Gaga's music".

In 2013, several disco- and funk-influenced songs charted as top hits, this time in a 1970s style. One source stated that the pop charts had more dance songs than at any other point since the late 1970s. The biggest nu-disco hit of the year was "Get Lucky" by Daft Punk, featuring Chic's Nile Rodgers on guitar. The song was initially thought likely to be a leading candidate to become the summer's biggest hit that year; however, the song ended up peaking at number 2 on the Billboard Hot 100 chart for five weeks behind another major disco-styled song, Robin Thicke's "Blurred Lines", which spent twelve weeks at number 1 on the Hot 100, and in the process became the eventual song of the summer itself. Both were popular with a wide variety of demographic groups.

From the mid-2010s onward, the trend has continued. Many major dance-pop artists dabbled into the style. Taylor Swift and producer Ali Payami incorporated nu-disco influences into Swift's 2015 single "Style". Calvin Harris released the nu-disco and funk album Funk Wav Bounces Vol. 1 in 2017, which reached high positions on the British and American charts. Dua Lipa released the nu-disco album Future Nostalgia in 2020, which also topped the charts. The album spawned the nu-disco single "Don't Start Now", which peaked at number 2 on the Billboard Hot 100. In 2020, Róisín Murphy released a nu-disco album Róisín Machine which received widespread critical acclaim. Róisín Machine's first single, "Simulation", came out in 2012. In November 2020, Australian singer-songwriter Kylie Minogue, a nu-disco pioneer and stalwart, released her fifteenth studio album Disco, with Culture Fix describing the lead single "Say Something" as an "elegant nu-disco anthem".

In May 2020, Studio 54, the former nightclub and 1970s center of disco culture, launched a record label called Studio 54 Music, featuring newly re-imagined versions of classic club disco tracks by Don Ray and T-Connection.

== Characteristics ==
=== Drum groove ===
Since nu-disco is a dance genre first and foremost, the drum grooves are an essential part. They often feature four-on-the-floor beats with an organic, lively feel based on the sounds of classic disco recordings by Chic, Sister Sledge, and others. In some cases, producers will sample these grooves directly.

=== Live instrumentation ===
While modern production is abundant with synthesized sounds, many nu-disco records are, in the disco tradition, driven by guitar or bass licks. Guitarist, producer, and songwriter Nile Rodgers brought riffs to the forefront of the groove with Chic in the 1970s and again with Daft Punk in 2013. Other notable modern examples include "Baby I'm Yours" by Breakbot and "Holding On" by Classixx. "Be Good 2 Me" by Luxxury is an example of mixing live instrumentation (bass, guitar, vocals) with samples (beats, percussion).

=== Synthesizers ===
As with other electronic genres, nu-disco producers use both digital and analog synths to create melodic and harmonic lines, and add ambiance and color to their records. Gigamesh uses a heavily synthesized sound while still retaining old-school influences in tracks such as "Back to Life", and Poolside uses atmospheric synths to complement their drum, bass, and guitar sounds in "Do You Believe".

=== Arrangement ===
Unlike its disco precursors, nu-disco and disco house are not beholden to song forms that are essential to the modern pop idiom. Rather than following the traditional verse-chorus model, nu-disco tends to take after its electronic cousins, with more drawn-out, repetitive sections that slowly ramp up to the chorus and back down again. Otherwise monotonous lines are brought to life with the use of filters, samples, and other subtle changes in the sound or groove over time in ways that make people want to keep dancing. Daft Punk's "One More Time" is considered one of the most influential examples of the application of "filter disco."

== Notable labels ==
- Black Cock Records (UK) was founded by DJ Harvey, and operated primarily in the 1990s. The label issued disco mixes and re-edits, and encouraged many young DJs on the label to incorporate disco elements into their house mixes, despite it being out of fashion at the time.
- Nuphonic Records (UK), which carries releases from a range of electronic genres and subgenres, helped launch a number of acts in the 1990s and early 2000s including Faze Action and Raj Gupta, and was one of the early pioneers of collaboration, fusion of genres, and live performance in disco house and beyond. The label has been suggested as the origin of the phrase "nu-disco".
- DFA Records (NYC) was initially started by James Murphy as a platform to launch his and his band LCD Soundsystem's music. The label has released records from a number of dance rock and nu-disco acts, including its first hit with The Rapture and nu-disco/electronica project The Juan MacLean.
- Roche Musique (FR) is a progressive nu-disco and chill electronica label on the French scene. Citing the importance of the "French Touch", artists such as FKJ and Darius have released records on the label.
- Ballroom Records (US) was a label that produced a large number of bootleg re-edits released as white labels.

== Notable artists ==
- French duo Daft Punk has had a significant influence on nu-disco and numerous genres related to it. Their albums Homework, the Grammy-winning Random Access Memories, and Discovery contain several reinterpretations of classic disco records, and they collaborated with Nile Rodgers on the hit single "Get Lucky". Although many French artists in the French house scene have produced music associated with nu-disco, Daft Punk are the most recognised name in the scene internationally.
- Dimitri From Paris, another French artist, is also strongly associated with the genre. Rather than focusing on 1970s pop records, he uses eclectic sources for samples such as 1950s jazz, Latin exotica, and film soundtracks.
- Norwegian producer Hans-Peter Lindstrøm pioneered a new sound in European clubs that became a precursor to nu-disco. With a musical background spanning from country and rock to gospel and jazz, Lindstrom's "Norse House", which has gained an international reputation, evoked many of the elements of 1970s disco. Other Norwegian producers connected to the scene are Lindstrom's studio mate Prins Thomas and protege Todd Terje.

== See also ==
- Future funk
- Sampling music
- Mashup music
