= Evergreen (American band) =

American post-hardcore band

Evergreen was a Southern California underground post-hardcore band from the early-to-mid-1990s. They were influential in the development of emo in the 1990s.

They had several releases over their lifespan, including two 7-inches, a split 7-inch with Los Angeles hardcore/screamo band Still Life, and a much sought-after 12-inch, most of which were released on Anomaly Records. They still have a 7-inch out on San Diego's Gravity Records. They are notorious amongst record collectors due to the rarity of their Seven Songs album.

Band members were Aaron Calvert on guitar and vocals, Andy Ward on bass (also of Antioch Arrow), and Jason Boesel on drums (now in Rilo Kiley and Phases).

== Discography ==
- Evergreen / Still Life (1993, Anomaly)
- Seven Songs (1994, Anomaly, Whaleboy)
- Evergreen (1994, Wretched Records)
- These Last Days (1997, Gravity Records)

=== Compilations ===
- "Forced Feed Ed" on Emergency Broadcast Systems Volume Three (1993, Allied Recordings)
- "Untitled" on Basement Tapes: A KSPC Compilation Of Live Recordings (1995, KSPC)
- "My Irish Lady (The Leftover Queen)" on In Memory Of Jason (1996, Monopoly Records)
