= Antioch Arrow =

American post-hardcore band

- Origin: San Diego, California, U.S.
- Genres: Post-hardcore; screamo; emo; hardcore punk; post-punk
- Years active: 1992–1994, 2026–present
- Labels: Gravity, Amalgameted Recording Corp, Three One G, Numero Group
- Spinoffs: Tarot Bolero, Decapitated Lovers, Get Hustle, Dangerous Boys Club, VR Sex
- Spinoff of: Heroin, End Of The Line
- Members: Aaron Montaigne; Mac Mann; Ron Avila; Devin Welch
- Past members: Jeff Winterberg; Andy Ward; Aaron Richards

Antioch Arrow is an American punk rock band from San Diego, California, that formed in 1992. Most of their discography was released through the San Diego independent label Gravity Records. The label was responsible for raising San Diego's profile in the underground music scene of the mid-1990s. The band, breaking up in 1994 and releasing one final studio album posthumously in 1995, is now considered to be one of the most influential bands of the early 1990s that shaped emo and post-hardcore music of the late 1990s and early 2000s.

== History ==
The band was first formed in 1992 by vocalist Aaron Montaigne, bassist Mac Mann, and drummer Ron Avila (who is also known by his nicknames "Ron Anarchy" and "Maxamillion Avila"). Avila and Montaigne originally knew each other from their previous band Heroin; Avila was the original drummer of Heroin, but left after the group played their first two shows. Montaigne joined the group to replace him. The trio would soon recruit guitarists Jeff Winterberg and Aaron Richards and, under this line up, released a split 7-inch with the band Candle and their debut 12-inch extended play The Lady Is A Cat, both in 1993 through Gravity Records. After this, Richards left the band and was subsequently replaced by Andy Ward, who was previously in the group Evergreen.

With their line-up solidified, the group would release their second extended play In Love With Jetts in 1994, again through Gravity Records. During their run, the group embarked on 3 different tours within the United States. The first was a week-long tour of the West Coast in the spring of 1993. The second was a month-long tour of the U.S., spanning late June to early July 1993. The third and final tour was originally supposed to be for 6 weeks from early June to late July 1994. However, van troubles and inter-band conflict ended the tour in early July with the band canceling many shows across the Northwest. Their last show ever took place in a truck trailer in Boulder, Colorado, around July 6, 1994. In December 1994, the group was offered by Amalgamented Recording Corp to fly out to Los Angeles, California, to record, which resulted in the group's final album, Gems Of Masochism, which was released posthumously in 1995. The album is noted for its gothic sound, utilizing synthesizers. According to Montaigne, it was ill-received by the punk scene when it was initially released.

=== Post-breakup ===
Since the group's break-up, members have gone on to work on other musical projects. Andy Ward and Ron Avila, for example, formed the Three One G supergroup Holy Molar. Aaron Montaigne would later form a heroin addiction by the late 1990s, but eventually sobered when he joined the US Army in the early 2000s. Motaigne would play drums for the deathrock band VR SEX. Jeff Winterberg would go on to do photography, and in 2011 he was diagnosed with medulloblastoma, a rare form of cancer that typically affects children, with only two percent of cases affecting adults. Archival record label The Numero Group announced they would be reissuing their discography in 2026, culminating in Your Hearts Belong to Us, a compilation of their discography with unreleased songs.

== Style, influences, and legacy ==
The band is typically seen as a vital part of the "San Diego sound", an early style of post-hardcore originating from San Diego that was popularized by bands such as Swing Kids and Heroin. The group's first three releases were issued by Gravity Records, a label that is also considered to have played an important role in the "San Diego sound". The band's early recordings, such as The Lady Is A Cat, displayed a somewhat "basic" hardcore punk sound, while In Love With Jetts introduced a much more spastic, noisy style that the band would later be known for. The group's final album, Gems Of Masochism, introduced synthesizers and an overall gothic aesthetic, both musically and visually. The band has been described as post-hardcore, art punk, emo, post-punk, and no wave. They have been described as pioneers of screamo as well.

The band has gone on to name many influences, including mid-late 1980s DC emo and hardcore bands such as Ignition and Rites of Spring. The Birthday Party was also a major early influence for the group, and the somewhat strange style of The Nation of Ulysses also inspired the group majorly. Vocalist Aaron Montaigne has also stated that the vocal style of Chris Thompson (of the late 1980s Washington, DC hardcore group Fury) shaped his own style of desperate, fearful vocals. In a 2024 interview, Aaron Montaigne credited his vocal style as derived from San Francisco emo band Fuel. Other influences they have cited include Embrace, Squirrel Bait and Shudder to Think.

Antioch Arrow were a highly influential band for their time. They influenced sass music. At the Drive-In once stated how the group influenced them, as well as The Blood Brothers. The experimental noise rock band Racebannon has also described Antioch Arrow as an early influence.

== Members ==
=== Current members ===
- Aaron Montaigne – vocals (1992–1994, 2026–present)
- Mac Mann – bass (1992–1994, 2026–present); guitar, piano, keyboards, organ (1994, 2026–present)
- Ron Avila – drums (1992–1994, 2026–present)
- Devin Welch – guitar, bass (2026–present)

=== Former members ===
- Jeff Winterberg – guitar (1992–1994)
- Aaron Richards – guitar (1992–1993)
- Andy Ward – guitar, bass (1994)

== Discography ==
=== Albums ===
- The Lady Is A Cat (1993, Gravity)
- In Love With Jetts (1994, Gravity)
- Gems Of Masochism (1995, Amalgamated)

=== Singles and EPs ===
- Antioch Arrow/Candle split (1993, Gravity)
- "The Suspecious Uzi (Unreleased Recording)" (2026, Numero Group)
- "Picnic Pants (Live at Che Cafe)" (2026, Numero Group)

=== Compilations ===
- In Love With Jetts / The Lady Is a Cat Plus (1997, Gravity)
- Your Hearts Belong to Us (2026, Numero Group)

=== Compilation/other appearances ===
- "The Fixed Orbit" on KXLU 88.9FM Los Angeles Live Vol. I (1995, KXLU)
- "Too Bad You're Gonna Die" on Three One G 2007 (2007, Three One G)
- "Lightning Bolt" on It's Gonna Blow: San Diego's Music Underground 1986-1996 (2014, Billingsgate Media)
- "Paper Moshay" on Dry Cleaning - Inner World 027 (2022, World of Echo)
- "Conspiring the Go-Go" on Self Adhesive Eyebrows & Moustache Video Compilation
