= The Lady Is a Cat =

Studio album by Antioch Arrow
- Released: 1993
- Studios: Double Time Studio, Santee, CA
- Genre: Post-hardcore • emo • screamo • hardcore punk
- Length: 13:30
- Label: Gravity
- Producer: Matt Anderson

Antioch Arrow chronology
Antioch Arrow/Candle (1993)	The Lady Is a Cat (1993)	In Love with Jetts (1994)

Professional ratings
Review scores
Source	Rating
AllMusic	3/5 stars

The Lady Is a Cat is the first album by American band Antioch Arrow, which was released in 1993 through Gravity Records on 12" vinyl. The record was packaged in spray-painted chipboard sleeves, and the cover design was lifted from the poster for the 1955 film The Man with the Golden Arm. Although primarily pressed on black vinyl, rare translucent red copies were also pressed and released secretly. The total number of these copies is unknown.

The album is characterized by its hardcore-rooted sound that is "simple" compared to the recordings the band would later release. The record, in its entirety, was included on the band's self-titled 1997 compilation album.

== Track listing ==
No.	Title	Length
1.	"Conspiring the Go-Go"	1:47
2.	"Lightning Bolt"	2:04
3.	"Ain't My Day"	1:36
4.	"The Fixed Orbit"	2:04
5.	"The Guardian Angel"	1:48
6.	"Klutz On Broadway"	2:00
7.	"Teenage Debutaunt and the Debutaunt Ball"	2:10
Total length:		13:30

== Personnel ==
- Aaron Montaigne – vocals
- Aaron Ricards – guitar
- Jeff Winterberg – guitar
- Mac Mann – bass
- Ron Avila – drums
- Matt Anderson – recording
