= Mohinder =

Mohinder is an Indian male name, possibly a variant of Mahendra. Among the people named Mohinder are:

- Mohinder Amarnath, Indian cricketer
- Mohinder Lal (field hockey), Indian hockey player
- Mohinder Pratap Chand, Indian poet
- Mohinder Purba (a.k.a. Deep Roy), Kenyan actor
- Mohinder Saran, Canadian politician
- Mohinder Singh, Indian triple jumper born 1934
- Mohinder Singh Dhoni, Indian cricketer
- Mohinder Singh Gill, Indian triple jumper born 1947
- Mohinder Singh Kaypee, Indian politician
- Mohinder Singh (middle distance runner), Indian winner of the 1500 metres at the 1962 Asian Games
- Mohinder Singh Pandher, Indian serial murder victim
- Mohinder Singh Pujji, Indian RAF Fighter pilot in World War II
- Mohinder Singh Randhawa, Indian art historian
- Mohinder Singh Sarna (aka S. Mohinder), Indian film score composer
- Mohinder Suresh, fictional character in the U.S. TV series Heroes, portrayed by Sendhil Ramamurthy

== See also ==
- Mohinder (band), an American post-hardcore band
