= In Love with Jetts =

Studio album by Antioch Arrow
- Released: 1994
- Studios: Double Time Studio, Santee, CA
- Genre: Post-hardcore • emo • screamo • hardcore punk • art punk • noise rock
- Length: 13:51
- Label: Gravity
- Producer: Matt Anderson

Antioch Arrow chronology
The Lady Is a Cat (1993)	In Love with Jetts (1994)	Gems of Masochism (1995)

Professional ratings
Review scores
Source	Rating
AllMusic	4/5 stars

In Love with Jetts is the second album by American band Antioch Arrow, first issued as a 12" record in 1994 through Gravity Records. The album has a spastic sound, a change in pace compared to the band's previous release The Lady Is a Cat. It is the first recording by the group to feature guitarists Andy Ward and Jeff Winterberg. Ward, as described by vocalist Aaron Montaigne, brought an "avant-garde" guitar playing style to the group's sound.

The album was repressed on vinyl in 1997 with alternative artwork. The album, in its entirety, was included on the 1997 self-titled compilation album that features the same artwork as the 12" repress.

== Track listing ==
No.	Title	Length
1.	"Angel's Lawn"	1:20
2.	"The Puppy Love"	1:20
3.	"Chaos Vs. Cosmos"	1:28
4.	"Space Age"	1:25
5.	"This Great Wall"	1:57
6.	"Somba"	1:43
7.	"Antioch Gold (For You)"	1:35
8.	"The Blessed Test"	1:41
9.	"The Suspicious Uzi"	0:53
Total length:		13:51

== Personnel ==
- Aaron Montaigne – vocals
- Jeff Winterberg – guitar
- Andy Ward – guitar
- Mac Mann – bass
- Ron Avila – drums
- Matt Anderson – recording
