= Echoes (The Rapture album) =

Studio album by the Rapture
- Released: September 8, 2003
- Recorded: 2002
- Studio: Plantain Recording House (New York City)
- Genres: Dance-punk revival; indietronica; post-punk; art punk; indie dance
- Length: 47:00
- Labels: DFA; Universal; Vertigo; Output
- Producers: The DFA; The Rapture

The Rapture chronology
Out of the Races and Onto the Tracks (2001)	Echoes (2003)	Pieces of the People We Love (2006)

Singles from Echoes
- 1. "House of Jealous Lovers" Released: August 2003; 2. "Sister Saviour" Released: December 1, 2003; 3. "Love Is All" Released: February 2004

Echoes is the debut full-length studio album by American rock band the Rapture. It was released on September 8, 2003, by DFA and Output in the UK, and on October 21, 2003, by DFA, Vertigo, and Universal in the U.S. It was co-produced by the DFA and the Rapture and recorded at the DFA's own Plantain Recording House studio in New York City.

== Background ==
The Rapture moved from San Francisco to New York in 1999 and wrote "House of Jealous Lovers" the following year. They met James Murphy and Tim Goldsworthy of DFA Records at one of their first performances in New York. Murphy and Goldworthy took a long time to persuade the band to work together because of a concern that making a dance song would alienate their fans. With the help of the DFA production team, the band released "House of Jealous Lovers" in 2002 and eventually released their first full-length album Echoes. The album secured two Top 40 singles in the UK and also was met with critical acclaim, being awarded Album of the Year by pitchforkmedia.com and runner up in NME only to the White Stripes.

Multi-instrumentalist Gabriel Andruzzi, who is also Safer's cousin, joined the band full-time after the record was completed to help tour. In the wake of the success of "House of Jealous Lovers", The Rapture opened for the Sex Pistols in a football stadium in England, and underwent a large major bidding war eventually signing with Vertigo Records out of the UK and Strummer Records (a Gary Gersh Label) both owned by Universal Music. In January 2004, the Rapture toured with Franz Ferdinand on the NME Awards Tour. Later that year, the band toured on the main stage of the Curiosa Festival alongside Interpol, Mogwai, and The Cure.

== Reception ==
Professional ratings
Aggregate scores
Source	Rating
Metacritic	76/100
Review scores
Source	Rating
AllMusic	3/5 stars
Entertainment Weekly	B+
The Guardian	3/5 stars
Los Angeles Times	2.5/4 stars
NME	9/10
Pitchfork	9.0/10
Q	4/5 stars
Rolling Stone	3/5 stars
Spin	B−
The Village Voice	A−

The album was highly praised by Pitchfork, who hailed the album as the best of 2003, as well as placing the songs "I Need Your Love" at number 323 and "House of Jealous Lovers" at number 16 on their best songs of the 2000s countdown. Resident Advisor ranked the album at number 35 on their list of the best albums of the decade. The song "House of Jealous Lovers" was also ranked sixth on NME's list of the top 100 tracks of the decade.

== Track listing ==
All tracks are written by Luke Jenner, Vito Roccoforte, and Matt Safer, unless otherwise noted.

No.	Title	Writer(s)	Length
1.	"Olio"		5:20
2.	"Heaven"		3:47
3.	"Open Up Your Heart"		5:22
4.	"I Need Your Love"	Tim Goldsworthy; Jenner; James Murphy; Roccoforte; Safer	4:39
5.	"The Coming of Spring"		2:42
6.	"House of Jealous Lovers"		5:04
7.	"Echoes"		3:06
8.	"Killing"	Goldsworthy; Jenner; Murphy; Roccoforte; Safer	3:37
9.	"Sister Saviour"	Goldsworthy; Jenner; Murphy; Roccoforte; Safer	3:51
10.	"Love Is All"		4:26
11.	"Infatuation"		5:01

== Personnel ==
All personnel adapted from album liner notes.

The Rapture

- Gabriel Andruzzi – saxophone, percussion
- Luke Jenner – vocals, guitar, keyboards, percussion
- Vito Roccoforte – drums, percussion
- Matt Safer – vocals, bass guitar, keyboards, percussion

Additional musicians

- Pete Cafarella – additional keyboards
- Tyler Brodie – backing vocals (track 6)
- Amber Lasciak – backing vocals (track 6)
- Mandy Stein – backing vocals (track 6)
- Helen Stickler – backing vocals (track 6)

Technical personnel

- The DFA – production
- Tim Goldsworthy – programming, multi instruments, engineering, mixing
- James Murphy – programming, multi instruments, engineering, mixing

== Charts ==
Chart (2003)	Peak position
French Albums (SNEP)	52
Swedish Albums (Sverigetopplistan)	55
UK Albums (Official Charts)	32
UK Rock & Metal Albums (Official Charts)	4
US Billboard 200	121
US Heatseekers Albums (Billboard)	2

== Use of songs in other media ==
- "Echoes" appeared in the 2007 comedy Superbad, and is the theme song for the British drama Misfits.
- "Killing" was featured in the 2005 video game True Crime: New York City.
- "House of Jealous Lovers" was featured as part of the soundtrack for NBA 2K15.
