= North Coast Journal =

Newspaper in Arcata, California

North Coast Journal of Politics, People & Art
- Type: Alternative weekly
- Format: Tabloid half sheet size
- Owner: Melissa Sanderson
- Editor: Thadeus Greenson; Jennifer Fumiko Cahill
- Founded: 1990
- Headquarters: Eureka, California
- Circulation: 21,000 (2020)
- Price: Free
- ISSN: 1099-7571
- Website: northcoastjournal.com

The North Coast Journal is an alternative weekly newspaper serving Humboldt County, California. The Journal is published in Eureka, California and includes coverage of the arts, news, personages, and politics of the region.

== History ==
In June 1990, the paper was established. It expanded from a monthly into a weekly in 1998. In 2019, the paper acquired the Ferndale Enterprise. In 2021, Melissa Sanderson acquired the Journal from Judy Hodgson and Carolyn Fernandez.
