= Pieces of the People We Love =

Studio album by The Rapture
- Released: September 12, 2006
- Recorded: Spring 2006
- Studios: Sear Sound (New York City); Eastcote (London); Run-Roc (New York City); Glenwood Place (Burbank)
- Genres: Alternative rock; indie rock; post-punk revival; alternative dance
- Length: 43:25
- Labels: Universal Motown; Vertigo
- Producers: Paul Epworth; Ewan Pearson; Danger Mouse

The Rapture chronology
| Echoes (2003) | Pieces of the People We Love (2006) | In the Grace of Your Love (2011) |

Singles from Pieces Of The People We Love
- 1. "Get Myself Into It" Released: September 4, 2006; 2. "Whoo! Alright - Yeah...Uh Huh." Released: November 27, 2006; 3. "Pieces Of The People We Love" Released: March 12, 2007

Professional ratings
Aggregate scores
| Source | Rating |
|---|---|
| Metacritic | 74/100 |
Review scores
| Source | Rating |
| AllMusic | 3.5/5 stars |
| Blender | 3/5 stars |
| Collective | 4/5 stars |
| Drowned in Sound | 3/10 |
| The Guardian | 4/5 stars |
| Pitchfork | 7.8/10 |
| PopMatters | 8/10 |
| Robert Christgau | A− |
| Rolling Stone | 4/5 stars |
| Stylus | B+ |

Pieces of the People We Love is the second studio album by American rock band the Rapture. It was released on September 12, 2006 in the United States through Universal Motown Records and in the United Kingdom through Vertigo Records. It was primarily produced by Paul Epworth and Ewan Pearson, with Danger Mouse producing two tracks.

This album saw bassist Mattie Safer taking a more prominent role in songwriting and also singing lead vocals on several songs, with multi-instrumentalist Gabriel Andruzzi also being involved in the band's songwriting for the first time. As a result, creative tensions arose between them and the band's co-founders, vocalist-guitarist Luke Jenner and drummer Vito Roccoforte. In 2011 Jenner said, "[Safer] also had ambitions himself, to be a songwriter, but that really came out strongly on Pieces of the People We Love. He wanted to write songs and so he started taking up a lot more space and Gabe joined the band. It became this power struggle between Mattie and Gabe and me and Vito and, um, Vito doesn't like conflict so it left me kind of versus Mattie and Gabe so I lost that one."

== Track listing ==
All tracks are written by Luke Jenner, Vito Roccoforte, Gabriel Andruzzi, and Matt Safer.

| No. | Title | Length |
|---|---|---|
| 1. | "Don Gon Do It" | 4:35 |
| 2. | "Pieces of the People We Love" | 3:43 |
| 3. | "Get Myself Into It" | 4:42 |
| 4. | "First Gear" | 6:23 |
| 5. | "The Devil" | 4:36 |
| 6. | "Whoo! Alright - Yeah... Uh Huh" | 3:48 |
| 7. | "Calling Me" | 3:46 |
| 8. | "Down For So Long" | 3:47 |
| 9. | "The Sound" | 4:25 |
| 10. | "Live In Sunshine" | 4:00 |

== Personnel ==
All personnel adapted from album liner notes.

The Rapture

- Luke Jenner – guitar, percussion, keyboards, vocals
- Gabriel Andruzzi – keyboards, percussion, saxophone, "computer dudery"
- Vito Roccoforte – percussion, drums, "bleeps and bloops"
- Matt Safer – bass guitar, percussion, keyboards, vocals, "knobs 'n' throbs"

Additional musicians

- Lindsey Caldwell – backing vocals (track 4,6,9)
- Ilirjana Alushaj – backing vocals (track 4,6,9)
- Cee-Lo Green – backing vocals (track 2)

Technical personnel

- Paul Epworth – production (track 1,3–6,8–10)
- Ewan Pearson – production (track 1,3–6,8–10)
- Danger Mouse – production (track 2,7)

== Charts ==
Chart performance for Pieces of the People We Love
| Chart (2006) | Peak position |
|---|---|
| Australian Albums (ARIA) | 67 |
| Belgian Albums (Ultratop Flanders) | 75 |
| French Albums (SNEP) | 77 |
| Irish Albums (IRMA) | 52 |
| Scottish Albums (Official Charts) | 39 |
| UK Albums (Official Charts) | 40 |
| US Billboard 200 | 113 |
