= Out of the Races and Onto the Tracks =

EP by The Rapture
- Released: May 21, 2001
- Recorded: 2000–2001
- Studios: Plantain Studios (Manhattan, NY)
- Genres: Dance-punk; post-punk revival; art punk; no wave; post-hardcore
- Length: 21:11
- Label: Sub Pop
- Producers: Tim Goldsworthy; James Murphy

The Rapture chronology
Mirror (1999)	Out of the Races and Onto the Tracks (2001)	Echoes (2003)

Professional ratings
Review scores
Source	Rating
AllMusic	2.5/5 stars
The New Rolling Stone Album Guide	3/5 stars
Pitchfork Media	7.3/10

Out of the Races and Onto the Tracks is the debut EP by American rock band The Rapture. It was released on May 21, 2001, through Sub Pop, and produced by Tim Goldsworthy and James Murphy. The title track was featured in the film The Rules of Attraction. The E.P is the first piece of material released by The Rapture to feature bass player Matt Safer.

Out of the Races and Onto the Tracks was supposed to become a full fledged 12 track album, with 6 other songs recorded during these sessions that would eventually be released as part of the 'Insound Tour Support Series' and can be found on Youtube. However, according to the bands 2003 'Fader Magazine' cover story, their label Sub Pop wasn't willing to spend the money or wait the time for the proposed project. After the release of the E.P. The Rapture parted ways with Sub Pop.

== Track listing ==
No.	Title	Length
1.	"Out of the Races and Onto the Tracks"	4:03
2.	"Modern Romance"	2:32
3.	"Caravan"	3:18
4.	"The Jam"	4:31
5.	"The Pop Song"	2:47
6.	"Confrontation"	4:00

== Personnel ==
The Rapture

- Luke Jenner – guitar, percussion, vocals
- Vito Roccoforte – percussion, drums
- Matt Safer – bass guitar, percussion, vocals
