= In the Grace of Your Love =

Studio album by The Rapture
- Released: September 6, 2011
- Recorded: 2010–2011
- Studio: Motorbass (Paris); Gary's Electric (Brooklyn, NY); The End of Time at Moultrie
- Genre: Alternative dance; dance-punk
- Length: 50:27
- Label: DFA
- Producer: Philippe Zdar

The Rapture chronology
Pieces of the People We Love (2006)	In the Grace of Your Love (2011)

Singles from In the Grace of Your Love
- 1. "How Deep Is Your Love?" Released: June 13, 2011; 2. "Sail Away" Released: November 21, 2011; 3. "In the Grace of Your Love" Released: June 19, 2012

Professional ratings
Aggregate scores
Source	Rating
Metacritic	65/100
Review scores
Source	Rating
AllMusic	4/5 stars
The A.V. Club	B
BBC	(negative)
Los Angeles Times	3/4 stars
Pitchfork Media	7.2/10
Rolling Stone	3.5/5 stars
Slant Magazine	4/5 stars

In the Grace of Your Love is the third studio album by the American rock band the Rapture. It was released on September 6, 2011. The album marks their return to DFA Records after leaving Universal Music Group and is their first album without former bassist Mattie Safer. The cover art features a picture of band member Luke Jenner's father.

== Background and composition ==
Following the end of touring for their previous album Pieces of the People We Love frontman Luke Jenner left the band, feeling "confused" and mourning the suicide of his mother. At the time Jenner was also in conflict with bassist and fellow songwriter Mattie Safer on the musical direction the band should take. Jenner considered making a solo record, but ultimately asked to rejoin the band. A few months later Safer left the band, and the remaining members started writing the new album from scratch, with the exception of "Miss You" and the album's title track which had been written while Safer was still in the band before being rewritten after his departure.

According to drummer Vito Roccoforte, Safer's exit meant more creative room for the remaining members. He said, "When [Safer] did leave, there was a lot more room, all of a sudden, creatively, because there was one less member. We were all pretty pent-up creatively, wanting to write and make music. We had no problem writing a bunch of stuff. And Luke had a bunch of old songs that we worked on, and me and Gabe had a bunch of ideas we brought in, and we all brought stuff in we had sitting around individually and worked together. We also came up with completely new material in the studio."

The band recorded the album with producer Phillipe Zdar in Paris. Zdar had just finished recording Wolfgang Amadeus Phoenix with Phoenix and feeling tired initially rejected working with the band, but later agreed to after hearing the demos. With Safer no longer in the band, multi-instrumentalist Gabriel Andruzzi recorded all of the bass parts for the album.

Lyrically songs focus on Jenner's mourning for his mother ("Miss You", "Children") and his coping with fatherhood ("Sail Away", "It Takes Time to Be a Man"). Gospel music has also been cited as a source of inspiration for the band during recording.

== Promotion ==
The album was announced on May 23, 2011, one day after the predicted Biblical Rapture by Harold Camping had been widely publicised, but failed to arrive. Drummer Vito Roccoforte commented on the timing "In terms of publicity, it was amazing for us... We couldn't have paid for that or done anything else that would have been better". To promote the album on August 16, 2011, the band streamed a video of the entire album playing on vinyl via Ustream. The band also answered questions from Twitter in the DFA Records office.

== Track listing ==
All tracks are written by the Rapture.

No.	Title	Music	Length
1.	"Sail Away"		5:21
2.	"Miss You"		4:10
3.	"Blue Bird"		3:06
4.	"Come Back to Me"	Franco Luambo	5:38
5.	"In the Grace of Your Love"		5:36
6.	"Never Die Again"		3:59
7.	"Roller Coaster"		3:41
8.	"Children"		3:56
9.	"Can You Find a Way?"		2:52
10.	"How Deep Is Your Love?"		6:27
11.	"It Takes Time to Be a Man"		5:41
Total length:			50:27
