= How Great Is Your Love (Sean Ardoin album) =

Studio album by Sean Ardoin
- Released: 2009
- Genre: Gospel music, Cajun, Zydeco

How Great Is Your Love is a 2009 zydeco album by Sean Ardoin and his "Christian zydeco" band R.O.G.K. The band's name is an acronym that means Reflections Of God’s Kingdom. The album was one of the first notable zydeco gospel albums.
