= Mirror (The Rapture album) =

Studio album by The Rapture
- Released: January 26, 1999
- Recorded: May – November 1998
- Genre: Post-punk revival; lo-fi indie; post-hardcore; art punk; no wave
- Length: 24:32
- Label: Gravity
- Producer: The Rapture

The Rapture chronology
Mirror (1999)	Out of the Races and Onto the Tracks (2001)

Professional ratings
Review scores
Source	Rating
AllMusic	2.5/5 stars

Mirror is a mini-album by American rock band the Rapture, released in 1999 through Gravity Records.

== Track listing ==
No.	Title	Length
1.	"In Finite Clock!"	0:42
2.	"Notes>>>"	2:14
3.	"Olio"	3:41
4.	"Frames Frames Frames"	1:33
5.	"Mirror"	5:06
6.	"Alienation"	4:47
7.	"Dusk at Maureen's"	1:50
8.	"In Love with the Underground (Kid606 mix)"	4:39
