= No Sex for Ben =

Song by the Rapture

from the album The Music of Grand Theft Auto IV
- Released: April 29, 2008
- Recorded: 2007
- Studio: Sarm (London)
- Genre: Dance-punk; alternative dance
- Length: 4:06
- Label: Rockstar Games
- Songwriters: Gabriel Andruzzi; Luke Jenner; Vito Roccoforte; Matt Safer
- Producer: Timbaland

"No Sex for Ben" is a song by the American rock band the Rapture, recorded for the soundtrack to the 2008 video game Grand Theft Auto IV and appearing on the game's fictional Radio Broker radio station. Produced by the hip-hop producer Timbaland, it is a diss track aimed at DJ Ben Rymer, sung by Matt Safer, the band's bassist. It was placed at number 26 on Rolling Stone's 100 Best Songs of 2008 list.

== Recording ==
While recording the song with Timbaland at SARM Studios in London, the band was visited by Justin Timberlake and Duran Duran, who were working upstairs on the latter's album Red Carpet Massacre which was also produced by Timbaland. According to multi-instrumentalist Gabriel Andruzzi, "Next thing we knew, [Timberlake] came downstairs and was like, ‘Aw shit! This track is great! Can I get on it?' and he just went and sang, like, six backup vocals for the chorus." Timberlake's vocals were eventually removed from the finished song. "I guess we couldn’t get approval or whatever. Even if you are paying for the studio time and he takes up three hours of it recording your song," said Andruzzi.

Reflecting on the recording experience, in 2011 vocalist-guitarist Luke Jenner said, "It was really fun because they gave us a truck load of money. It was as extreme into the pop world as we got. We did it in London with Timbaland. Justin Timberlake was upstairs recording with Duran Duran so he came down and sang vocals on it, then Duran Duran came down with their supermodel wives. It was good fun, I learned a lot from it but it was also the genesis of the massive breakdown that our band had."

== Composition ==
The song is an extended diss track aimed at Ben Rymer, a DJ formerly of British electroclash band Fat Truckers, and a friend of the band's then-bassist Mattie Safer, who also sang lead vocals on the song. The track aims to be humorously insulting, comparing the DJ at one point to "A poor man's Arthur Baker". According to regular collaborator Ewan Pearson, "It's basically Mattie taking the piss out of Ben. I think when Ben first heard it he wasn't quite sure how to take it. Whether to take it as an enormous compliment or a terrible slur. Ben has a very Sheffield sense of humour which means that he takes the piss out of everybody so I think it was just Mattie wanting to send a little bit back his way."

Musically, the track is similar to The Rapture's trademark sound, with additional flourishes, such as a human beatbox, coming from producer Timbaland's production.

== Release and reception ==
The track was featured in Grand Theft Auto IV on the in-game radio station Radio Broker, a station featuring bands largely from the New York indie scene, and released exclusively on the official soundtrack called The Music of Grand Theft Auto IV which was a part of the Special Edition of the game and was later released digitally. The song was made specifically for the soundtrack of the game and is yet to feature on any Rapture album or release. It was placed at number 26 on Rolling Stone's "'Top 100 Tracks of 2008" list as well as number 14 on the Triple J Hottest 100 of the same year. The track would later be used in the Gossip Girl episode "Reversals of Fortune" in September 2009.

The song was a hit in Australia, with Luke Jenner stating in 2011, "That song kept us alive for five years. In the interim we played Australia once a year for five years because that song was a big hit there. Ordinary people know it. Australia is where I lived out all my 14 year-old rock star dreams." In contrast, drummer Vito Roccoforte expressed his dissatisfaction with the song by saying, "It just didn’t make any fucking sense to me because it was the total antithesis of what I felt musically I wanted to do or what we should be doing." Meanwhile, according to Gabriel Andruzzi, "It was interesting because of how much we’d loved Timbaland before. But it didn’t play to the strengths of this band at all."

Jenner also identified the song as the genesis for Mattie Safer's eventual departure from the band. According to Jenner,

"Mattie decided he really wanted to be a pop star and didn't need us any more. He wanted to make Timbaland-esque music and got really weird and said things like, I want to make a record you guys don't play on. We were like, How's that going to work? That's not good!"

In 2016, Safer commented,

"We worked with Tim on 'No Sex For Ben' on the Grand Theft Auto IV soundtrack, but he was also a really big fan of the band and wanted to sign us to his label. Working in the studio with him was awesome. He was so full of ideas and worked quickly and it was just about getting the best ideas down on tape without worrying about who the author was. It was just fun and I really would have loved to continue that relationship. The other guys didn't get the same things out of the experience and I respect that. But I think I enjoyed it so much just because it was like having somebody to work with in a different way who also got the music and brought something to it and there was just very little ego involved—a very different creative process to what being in a band can be like, where people sometimes get very protective about their parts, even if it means not doing things that might make the record better."
