= Gravity Records =

Record Label

Gravity
- Founded: 1991
- Founder: Matt Anderson
- Distributor: Mordam Records
- Genre: Post-hardcore, hardcore punk, experimental rock, indie rock
- Country of origin: U.S.
- Location: San Diego, California
- Official website: www.gravityrec.com

Gravity is an underground independent record label from San Diego. It was formed in 1991 by Matt Anderson, a member of the influential underground band Heroin. It has been central in developing and promoting the "San Diego sound" – an idiosyncratic form of post-hardcore with loose, chaotic musicianship and vocals, initiated by Heroin, Antioch Arrow, and Clikatat Ikatowi, as well as Mohinder from the Bay Area and Angel Hair from Colorado. The sound is associated with the first wave of screamo, and the label played an important role in the development of post-hardcore in the 1990s. Gravity has also branched out into other forms of experimental or independent music, releasing seminal early works by Unwound, Black Dice, The Rapture, and a full-length from Man Is The Bastard. The label has no affiliation with the Capitol Records subsidiary Gravity Inc Records.

== Label roster ==
- Angel Hair
- Antioch Arrow
- Bastard Noise
- Black Dice
- The Black Heart Procession
- Born Against
- Clikatat Ikatowi
- The Convocation
- Crime Desire
- Crom-Tech
- A Day Called Zero
- Earthless
- Evergreen
- Fisticuffs Bluff
- The Fucking Angels
- Get Hustle
- Heroin
- Huggy Bear
- John Henry West
- Lava
- Les Aus
- Man Is the Bastard
- Men's Recovery Project
- Mohinder
- Monorchid
- Physics
- Prizehog
- The Rapture
- Sea of Tombs
- Second Story Window
- The Spacewürm
- Spacehorse
- Stacatto Reads
- Three Mile Pilot
- Tristeza
- Universal Order of Armageddon
- Unwound
- The V.S.S.
- Vicious Ginks
- Young Ginns

== Discography ==
This list is organized by catalog number. Also note that two releases that have the catalog number 2 and, there is no release in the Gravity Records catalog to have the catalog number 50.

No.	Year	Artist	Title	Format	Release notes
1	1992	Heroin	Heroin	7-inch	Some later white label pressings included photographs glued to the labels
2	1992	Lava	Lava	7-inch	Packaged in silkscreened sleeve with a variety of colors screened. Some copies had blue covers, other black, some brown
2	1992	Dark Sarcasm	Lego Facilities	7-inch	Co-release with Vinyl Communications
3	1993	Young Ginns	Young Ginns	7-inch	Original pressings had black-on-white labels, while later pressings had the reverse
4	1993	Antioch Arrow	The Lady Is A Cat	12-inch	Packaged in spray painted covers
4.5	1993	Antioch Arrow/Candle	Antioch Arrow/Candle	7-inch	Split between Antioch Arrow and Candle, co-released with Wrenched Records
5	1993	Universal Order of Armageddon/Born Against	Universal Order of Armageddon/Born Against	7-inch	The first pressing came packaged in manilla envelopes, while later pressings were packaged in more "regular" sleeves
6	1993	Unwound	Unwound	7-inch	Single-sided 7-inch with an etched B-side featuring lyrics. All tracks on this record were later released again on the band's 1995 self-titled album.
7	1993	Heroin	Heroin	12-inch	Split release with Vermiform Records. Two different covers for this release exists.
8	1994	John Henry West	John Henry West	7-inch	Packaged in a manilla envelope
9	1994	Huggy Bear	Long Distance Lovers	7-inch	First pressing was packaged in yellow sleeves with pink ink, while the second pressing was issued in an orange sleeve with white ink.
10	1994	Second Story Window	Second Story Window	7-inch	Two pressings exist, the second press in particular had pressing etchings that were scratched out
11	1994	Antioch Arrow	In Love With Jetts	12-inch	First issued in 1993, then repressed in 1997 with different artwork
12	1994	Universal Order of Armageddon	Universal Order of Armageddon	12-inch	Packaged in silk-screened sleeves
13	1994	Mohinder	Mohinder	7-inch	Released in a variety of sleeves, some of which were silk-screened pages of magazines
14	1994	Angel Hair	Angel Hair	7-inch	A large variety of covers exist, all with the same design but printed with different colored inks
15	1994	Second Story Window	Second Story Window	12-inch	Issued in silk-screened sleeves
16	1995	The Fucking Angels/Vicious Ginks	The Fucking Angels/Vicious Ginks	LP	Split full-length released in sleeves that had hand-pasted artwork
17	1995	Angel Hair	Insect Mortality	12-inch	Around 100 copies were packaged in silk-screened sleeves
18	1997	Angel Hair	Pregnant With The Senior Class	CD	Discography compilation
19	1996	Clikatat Ikatowi	Orchestrated And Conducted By	LP, CD	Pressed on CD and vinyl. A limited edition of hot pink LP copies were also pressed
20	1997	Heroin	Heroin	CD	Discography compilation
21	1995	Men's Recovery Project	Normal Man	7-inch	
22	1995	Man Is the Bastard	Thoughtless...	LP, CD	First issued as an LP in 1995, pressed on white vinyl as well as a picture disc. The CD edition was released in 1996. In 2012, the album was repressed on vinyl as editions of black, purple, and yellow.
23	1996	A Day Called Zero	A Day Called Zero	CD	
24	1998	Stacatto Reads	Stacatto Reads	7-inch	Sleeves were printed on a variety of colors
25	1995	The V.S.S.	The V.S.S.	7-inch	
26	1997	Clikatat Ikatowi	Live August 29th And 30th, 1995	LP, CD	
27	1996	Monorchild	When The Mutes Begin To Root	7-inch	
28	1997	Evergreen	These Last Days	7-inch	
29	1999	Heat	Chalk It Up	7-inch	Packaged in die-cut sleeve
30	1997	Antioch Arrow	Antioch Arrow	CD	Compilation featuring The Lady Is A Cat, In Love With Jetts, the Antioch Arrow tracks from their split 7-inch with Candle, and four previously unreleased live recordings. Features the same artwork from the 1997 12-inch pressing of In Love With Jetts.
31	1998	Three Mile Pilot	Three Mile Pilot	12-inch, CD	
32	1998	Clikatat Ikatowi	River Of Souls	12-inch, CD	Some 12-inch pressings includes 3 tracks on one side and 5 on the other, while other 12-inch pressings had an even track list with 4 tracks on both sides
33	1997	Crom-Tech	Crom-Tech	LP, CD	LP edition had silk-screened sleeves
34	1998	Physics	Physics²	CD	
35	1998	Black Dice	Black Dice	7-inch	Also known as Lambs Like Fruit. Some copies were pressed with not center labels
36	1999	The Rapture	Mirror	LP, CD	An unknown amount of clear LP copies exists
37	2000	Various Artists	Gravity 37. Compilation Video	VHS	Features videos of live performances by Gravity Records bands. The "soundtrack" was released as a CD the same year as the VHS home video release.
37	2000	Various Artists	Gravity 37. Compilation Video: The Soundtrack	CD	Features videos of live performances by Gravity Records bands. The "soundtrack" was released as a CD the same year as the VHS home video release.
38	2001	The Spacewürm	See You Later Oscillator	CD	
39	2001	Sea Of Tombs	Sea Of Tombs	LP, CD	
40	2001	Get Hustle	Who Do You Love?	7-inch	
41	2002	Tristeza	Mania Phase	12-inch, CD	
42	2003	Tristeza	Espuma	12-inch, CD	
43	2003	Various Artists	Gravity Video 2	DVD	Features videos of live performances by Gravity Records bands. The "soundtrack" was released as a CD the same year as the DVD home video release.
43	2003	Various Artists	Gravity Video 2 Soundtrack	CD	Features videos of live performances by Gravity Records bands. The "soundtrack" was released as a CD the same year as the DVD home video release.
44	2004	Spacehorse	Spacehorse	LP, CD	
45	2005	Earthless	Sonic Prayer	LP, CD	LP edition pressed on black, purple, teal, white, pink, red, orange, and clear vinyl. LP was later repressed in 2009 on translucent purple vinyl, then again in 2016 on green vinyl
46	2005	Earthless	Sonic Prayer Jam	10-inch	Pressed on black and blue/green swirl vinyl. Later repressed in 2012 as Gravity Records #54 on blue, green, and gray 12-inch vinyl as well as CD. In 2015, it was again repressed as a 12-inch, this time on orange vinyl
47	2009	Les Aus	Mitologia Natural	LP	
48	2008	The Convocation	My History Museum	7-inch	
49	2009	Bastard Noise	Rouge Astronaut	CD	Limited edition CD that also includes 4 glossy inserts, a sticker, and a foil-stamped poster
50
51	2010	Crime Desire	Every Day...In Chains	12-inch	Pressed on black and blue vinyl
52	2011	Crime Desire	Alone In A Dream EDICII	12-inch	Pressed on black and purple vinyl
53	2011	Universal Order of Armageddon	Universal Order of Armageddon	2×7″	Double 7-inch containing previously unreleased live recordings from 1993
54	2012	Earthless	Sonic Prayer Jam	12-inch, CD	Reissue of Gravity Records #46. Originally released in 2005 as a 10-inch, this edition was pressed on blue, grey, and green 12-inch vinyl, as well as a CD
55	2012	Prizehog	A Talking To	12-inch	Pressed on orange vinyl
N/A	1994	Clikatat Ikatowi	Demo	CS	Demo tape with single sided inkjet-printed inlay. On the blank side of the insert is the official Gravity Records mailing address, making this the only Gravity Records release to not have a catalog number.

== See also ==
- List of record labels
