= Metro Area =

Musical duo

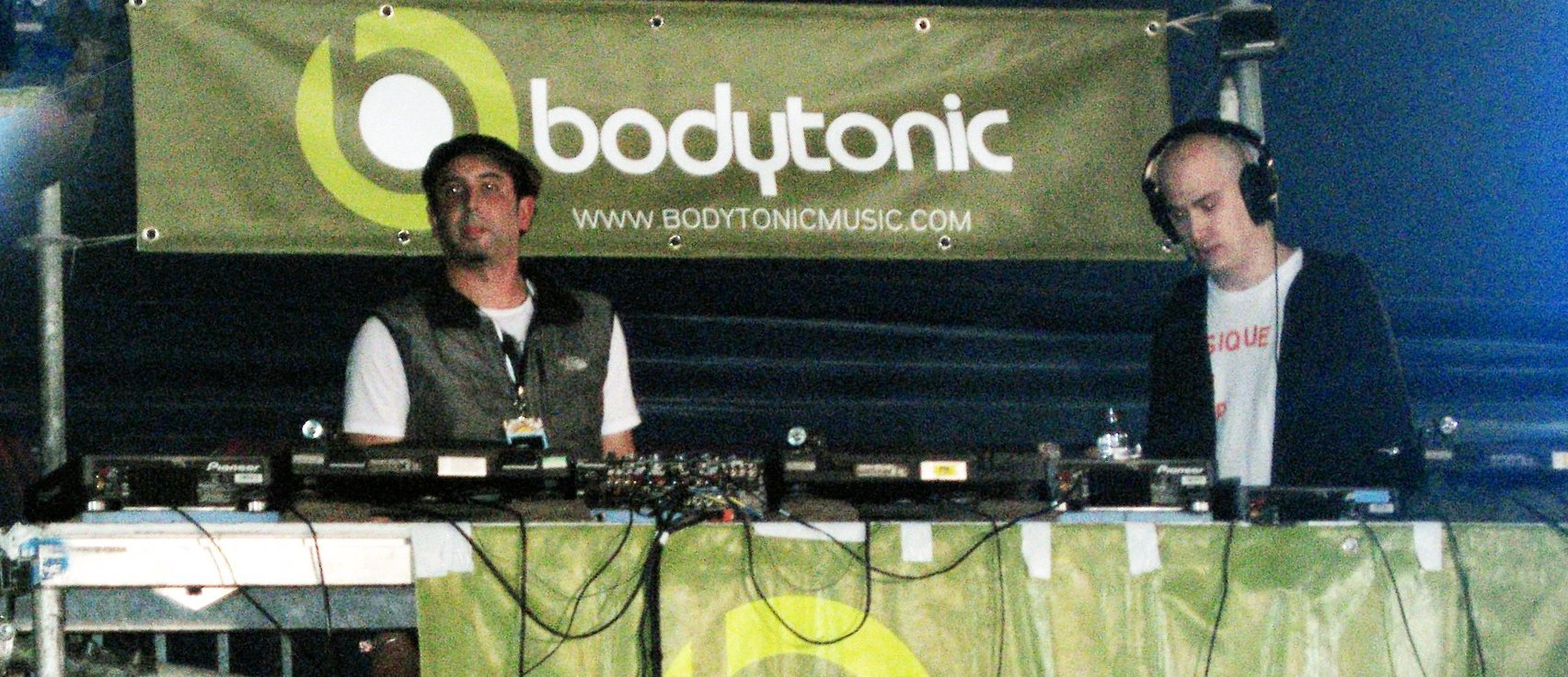
- Morgan Geist and Darshan Jesrani in 2006

Background information
- Genres: House, nu-disco
- Years active: 1998-present
- Labels: Environ; Source
- Members: Morgan Geist; Darshan Jesrani
- Website: Metro Area on Bandcamp

Metro Area is a Brooklyn-based house and nu-disco duo formed in 1998 by Morgan Geist and Darshan Jesrani.

== History ==
Geist grew up in Wayne, New Jersey, while Jesrani is from upstate New York. Both arrived at electronic music through their interest in rock music, with Geist through the electronic sound effects he noticed in progressive rock songs and Jesrani through the electronic introduction to Rush's song Tom Sawyer, which he says "led me into Devo, Thomas Dolby" in which both had been producing music independently since the mid-90s. Before forming Metro Area, Geist attended Oberlin College (where he founded his record label, Environ, in 1995) and was responsible for a number of highly regarded solo releases, while Jesrani began his production career as half of the groups Essa 3 and Acronym City. The two met through internet mailing lists in 1995 or 1996. After collaborating under the names "Sage." and "Phenom," they began Metro Area in 1998, releasing four 12"s on Environ under that name between 1999 and 2001. Edits of six tracks from these releases later turned up on their 2002 self-titled album, which received good reception, being named as "the second best album of the decade" by Resident Advisor and "the nineteenth best album of the decade" by Fact magazine. Both Jesrani and Geist are DJs as well as producers; in 2002 and 2003 they hosted a monthly residency at APT in the Meatpacking District, called Party Out of Bounds.

Morgan Geist also works under the name 'Storm Queen' and is best known for the successful single "Look Right Through", made popular as a dub version by Marc Kinchen.

== Discography ==
=== Albums ===
- Metro Area (2002)
- Fabric 43 (mix) (2008)
- Metro Area 5 & 6 (2012)

=== Singles and EPs ===
- Metro Area (1999)
- Metro Area 2 (2000)
- Metro Area 3 (2001)
- Metro Area 4 (2001)
- "Piña" (2001)
- "Dance Reaction" (2002)
- "More G.D.M. Vol. 3" with Gina X (2002)
- Metro Area 5 (2004)
- Metro Area 6 (2005)
- Metro Area 7 (2007)
- "Straight A's" (2013)
