= The Stars (band) =

Japanese psychedelic rock band

The Stars (ザ・スターズ) is a Japanese psychedelic rock band. It consists of ex-members of the band White Heaven including Michio Kurihara on guitar, You Ishihara on vocals and Chiyo Kamekawa on bass.

Additionally, Michio Kurihara (栗原ミチオ, Kurihara Michio) has played with Ai Aso, Cosmic Invention, Hazama, Ensemble Pearl, Overhang Party, Onna, Ghost, Damon & Naomi, Boris, Yura Yura Teikoku, and YBO2. He has also released a solo album, Sunset Notes. He collaborated with Boris on the 2006 album, Rainbow.

== Discography ==
- Today (2003)
- Perfect place to Hideaway (2005)
- Will (2005)
