= Mohinder (band) =

American hardcore punk band

- Origin: Cupertino, California, U.S.
- Genres: Post-hardcore; hardcore punk; screamo; emo; noise rock
- Years active: 1993–1994
- Labels: Unleaded; Gravity; Gold Standard Laboratories; Numero Group
- Spinoffs: Duster; Indian Summer; Helvetia; Her Space Holiday; Calm; Jenny Piccolo; The Anasazi; A-Set; Makara
- Past members: Marc Bianchi; Albert Menduno; Clay Parton; Canaan Dove Amber; James Fuhring

Mohinder was an American post-hardcore band from Cupertino, California, active from 1993 to 1994. Despite their brief existence, they are considered an important pillar of the 1990s California hardcore punk scene, and were one of the bands that helped define the genre now known as screamo.

Mohinder's songs tended to be short in duration, and are often characterized as being extremely intense and chaotic. Formed in 1993, they released three 7-inch EPs before breaking up in 1994. All of the tracks from these records have since been posthumously compiled into a single CD discography release, titled Everything, by Gold Standard Laboratories in 2001.

Following the band's break up, members went on to form many other groups, such as Duster, Indian Summer, Helvetia, Calm, Jenny Piccolo, The Anasazi, A-Set, and Makara. Marc Bianchi would also later release indietronic music under the name Her Space Holiday.

== Members ==
- James Fuhring – guitars, vocals (1993–1994)
- Canaan Dove Amber – bass, vocals (1993–1994)
- Marc Bianchi – guitars (1993–1994)
- Albert Menduno– drums (1993–1994)
- Clay Parton – guitars, bass (1994)

== Discography ==
=== Extended plays ===
- O Nation, You Bleed From Many Wounds, 1896 (1993, Unleaded)
- Mohinder (1994, Gravity)
- Mohinder ☆ Nitwits (1994, Unleaded)
- Transient Sequences (1999, Unleaded)

=== Compilation albums ===
- Everything (2001, Gold Standard Laboratories)

=== Compilation appearances ===
- Farmhouse Compilation '94 (1995, Farmhouse)
- We've Lost A Beauty: A Compilation For Christopher (1995, File 13)
- Kickstart - November 95 (1995)
- How Lovely Nowhere Is (1995, Nothing Everything)
- Audioflashcard (2002, Gold Standard Laboratories)
- Sequoia (2025, Numero Group)
