= The Rapture (band) =

American rock band

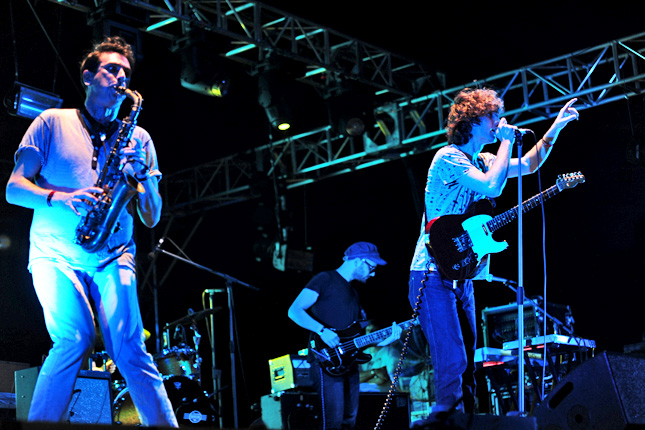
- The Rapture performing at the 2011 Southbound Festival

Background information
- Origin: New York City, New York, U.S.
- Genres: Dance-punk revival; electronica; alternative dance; art punk
- Years active: 1998–2014; 2019–2021; 2025–present
- Labels: DFA; Vertigo; Universal; Sub Pop; Gravity
- Members: Luke Jenner
- Past members: Vito Roccoforte; Gabriel Andruzzi; Mattie Safer; Brooks Bonstin; Christopher Relyea

The Rapture is an American rock band from New York City that formed in 1998. During their first incarnation, the band consisted of Luke Jenner (lead vocals, guitar), Vito Roccoforte (drums, percussion), and Gabriel Andruzzi (keyboards, bass, saxophone, percussion). The classic lineup (1999–2009) added Mattie Safer playing bass and sharing lead vocal duties with Jenner. Safer and Jenner's harmonized choruses became part of the signature sound of the band, featuring on several of the band's more well known songs.

The band mixed influences from many genres including dance-punk, post-punk, acid house, disco, and electronica. They were forerunners of the dance-punk revival coming out of the post-punk revival during the early 2000s, as they mixed their early post-punk sound with electronic and dance elements. The band has acknowledged that their music draws on themes of Christianity.

The band began by releasing a mini-album, Mirror, in January 1999, under Gravity Records. Afterward, in 2001, the band signed to Sub Pop and released the EP Out of the Races and Onto the Tracks. The band released the song "House of Jealous Lovers" in 2002 under their new record label DFA Records. After a re-release of the song, it peaked at number 27 on the UK Singles Chart in 2003 and received critical acclaim. Later that year, the band released their first full-length studio album, Echoes. The band released their second studio album, Pieces of the People We Love, in 2006 under Universal Records and Vertigo Records, featuring production from Danger Mouse, Paul Epworth, and Ewan Pearson.

The band entered a small hiatus in 2008 after band member Luke Jenner left the band, but he eventually returned to the band after 8 months. Mattie Safer, the band's long time bassist and vocalist, also left the band permanently in 2009. After a re-signing to DFA Records, the band released their third studio album, In the Grace of Your Love, in September 2011, which was their first studio album in five years. In 2014, it was revealed that the Rapture had disbanded, though no official statement had been made. The band later reunited in 2019 without Safer. In 2025, the Rapture announced a comeback tour, though only Jenner would remain from the original lineup.

== History ==
=== Formation, Mirror and Out of the Races and Onto the Tracks (1998–2002) ===
In 1998, drummer Vito Roccoforte and guitarist/vocalist Luke Jenner formed the Rapture. They were childhood friends from a San Diego suburb who started playing music together, and when Roccoforte moved to San Francisco for college, Jenner followed him and they started playing more, which would lead to forming the Rapture. Roccoforte was an aspiring filmmaker, but became a drummer at Jenner's insistence. According to Jenner in 2018, "In college, he got really good grades and had all of these ambitions to be a filmmaker. I kind of railroaded him into the Rapture. He didn't really want to be a drummer, but I needed somebody I could trust who was never going to leave my side. And he agreed; it's not like I forced him into it. I asked him humbly and he accepted." They released a single, "The Chair That Squeaks", on Hymnal Sound that same year. After heavy touring, they released a debut mini-album, Mirror, on Gravity Records in 1999.

After having his house burned down by drug dealers, their bass player suggested they move to Seattle because he had better music contacts there. In five months between January and May '99, the band spent more time getting drunk than writing songs, but they did manage to get a record deal from Sub Pop.

After releasing Mirror, they decided it would be best to move to New York, where they slept in a van that they had bought with money from the label. It was in New York that bassist and vocalist Mattie Safer, a freshman studying jazz at NYU joined the band. He had met them the previous summer when they were touring through Washington DC. He joined the band in the fall of 1999, prior to the 2001 release of the six-song EP Out of the Races and Onto the Tracks on Sub Pop. The addition of Safer proved to be pivotal for the band, according to Jenner. In 2006 he said, "There were five people in the band before Matt in the space of just over a year. He was the first person that was actually good. He was musically way better than us and brought a lot of stability. Listening to him for the first time made me think that I actually had better learn to play my own instrument."

Living in New York also made Jenner aware of the possibilities offered by dance music. In 2011 he said, "Coming to NY and going to proper dance music clubs, that was pivotal. I was hearing dance music over a big system and realizing it has the same energy as a hardcore show, the idea that a kick drum can be so powerful, so tough-sounding in a song like 'Don't Stop 'Til You Get Enough' by Michael Jackson on the right system. I think also, just the raw power of dancing, and the kind of communal aspect that could be created, like the same thing that sprouts up around punk rock kids, it could be the same with dance music."

=== "House of Jealous Lovers" and Echoes (2002–06) ===
With the help of the DFA production team, the Rapture released "House of Jealous Lovers" in 2002 and eventually released their first full-length album Echoes. The album secured two Top 40 singles in the UK and also was met with critical acclaim, being awarded Album of the Year by pitchforkmedia.com and runner up in NME only to the White Stripes. Multi-instrumentalist Gabriel Andruzzi, who is also Safer's cousin, joined the band full-time after the record was completed to help tour. In the wake of the success of "House of Jealous Lovers", The Rapture opened for the Sex Pistols in a football stadium in England, and underwent a large major bidding war eventually signing with Vertigo Records out of the UK and Strummer Records (a Gary Gersh Label) both owned by Universal Music. In January 2004, the Rapture toured with Franz Ferdinand on the NME Awards Tour. Later that year, the band toured on the main stage of the Curiosa Festival alongside Interpol, Mogwai, and The Cure. The album's main song, "Echoes", was used as opening for the British television series Misfits.

=== Pieces of the People We Love (2006–11) ===
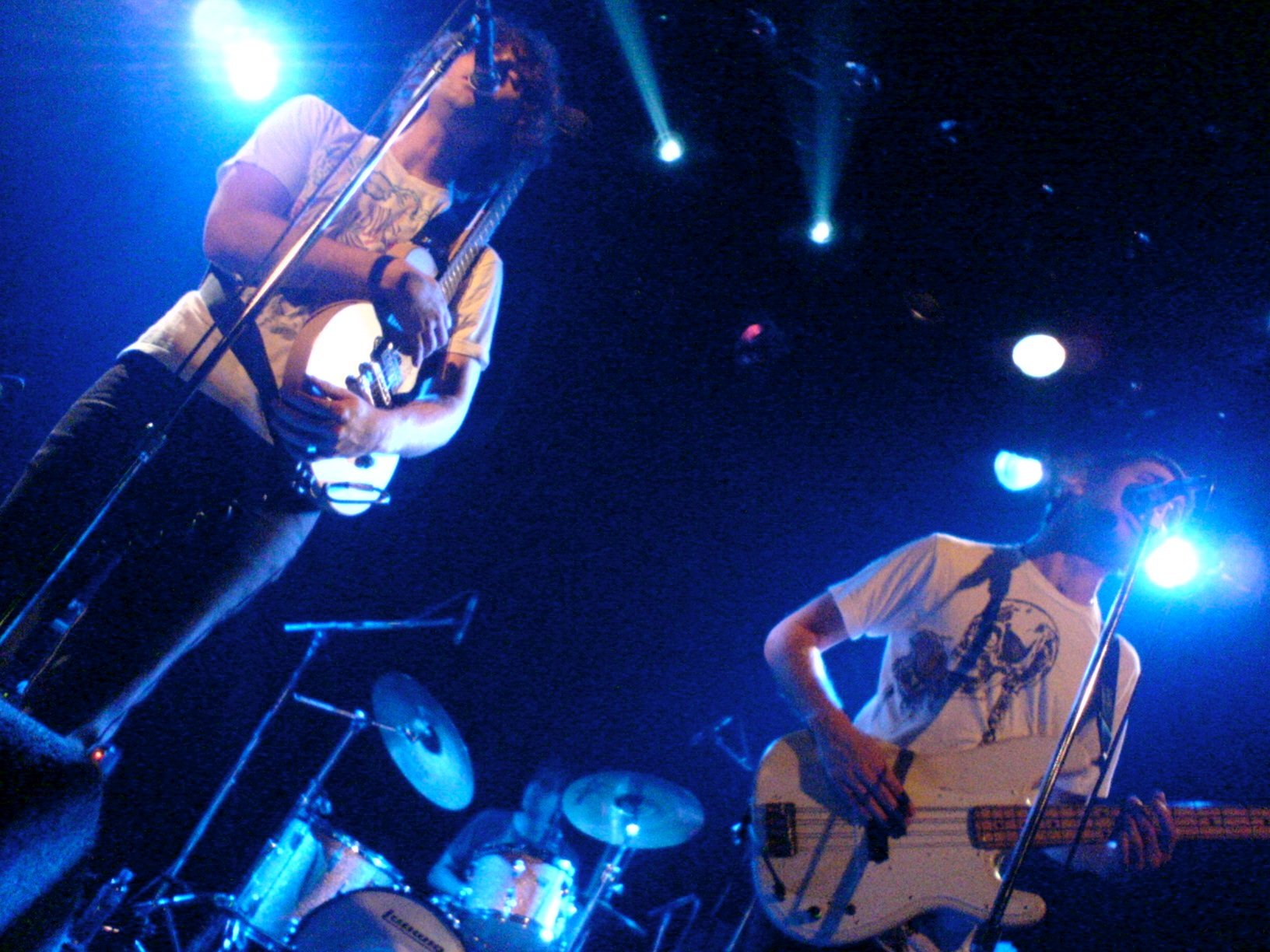
The Rapture performing live in 2006

The Rapture released their second full-length album, Pieces of the People We Love, on Universal Motown Records in September 2006 after Strummer folded. Paul Epworth, Ewan Pearson and Danger Mouse produced the album. Recorded mostly in New York city at Sear Sound (studio of Walter Sear, partner of Bob Moog) but also recorded a few songs in Los Angeles to work with Danger Mouse. The bulk of the recording being handled by Epworth and Pearson. The title track features Cee Lo Green on backing vocals. The Rapture also toured with Daft Punk on the North American leg of their tour in 2007, playing such venues as Red Rocks in Colorado, and the Greek Theatre in Berkeley California.

In an interview with Dave Owen of Access All Areas and I Can't Breathe Media, Luke Jenner stated that Justin Timberlake originally sang on the track "No Sex For Ben" that the band recorded for 2008's Grand Theft Auto IV video game soundtrack: "We were recording with Timbaland, 'cause he beatboxes on the track and Justin was upstairs with Duran Duran and he came down and sang [backing vocals] on the track [with Safer on lead vocals], but when we got it back from the label someone had removed JT's vocals." The song was a hit, with Jenner stating in 2011, "That song kept us alive for five years. In the interim we played Australia once a year for five years because that song was a big hit there. Ordinary people know it. Australia is where I lived out all my 14 year-old rock star dreams." In contrast, Vito Roccoforte stated his dissatisfaction with the song by saying, "It just didn't make any fucking sense to me because it was the total antithesis of what I felt musically I wanted to do or what we should be doing."

In 2008, Luke Jenner left the band in the wake of his mother's death and son's birth. After a few months he returned to the band. On July 14, 2009, Gabriel Andruzzi announced via The Rapture's official website that Mattie Safer had left the band in April and added that the remaining members had been working on new material since Safer's departure in their Brooklyn studio. In the days following Safer's departure Dave Owen caught up with Luke Jenner who said that the split was amicable. After leaving The Rapture, Mattie Safer spent a year and a half working on new music, then sending it out to various friends including Paul Epworth, who encouraged Safer to "stop worrying about trying to be cool." Expressing interest in Safer's R&B-influenced music, in 2011 Epworth signed him to the new label he was starting, Wolf Tone. Though Safer managed to record an EP, ultimately he and Wolf Tone decided to part ways, and in 2016 he finally released the EP All We Are. In 2011, Safer also appeared as a guest vocalist on "Someone Just Like You" from House of Beni, the debut album by Australian producer Beni. In August 2011, The Rapture first appeared on the cover of the publication The FADER, in its 75th issue.

=== In the Grace of Your Love and split (2011–14) ===
The Rapture released In The Grace of Your Love on DFA Records on September 6, 2011, in the U.S. and September 5 in Europe while Modular released the album in Australia and New Zealand. Phoenix producer/Cassius member Philippe Zdar produced the record, which the Rapture recorded in Brooklyn and Paris.

In 2014, Red Bull Music Academy announced Atomic Bomb! The Music of William Onyeabor, a concert in tribute to William Onyeabor led by David Byrne and featuring Jenner as one of the prominent musicians involved. In the press release, Jenner was listed as "ex-The Rapture." Jonathan Galkin, manager of DFA Records, seemingly confirmed that the band had indeed broken up by saying, "I kept thinking it might blow over, but that might not be the case. Feel free to go to press with this headline: 'Did the Rapture Break Up and Not Tell Anyone?'" In late 2014, Jenner asserted that while the band had never released an official statement about breaking up and that Galkin's comments being picked up by the media had led to that assumption, there were issues that needed to be resolved before they could make new music again. He said, "A band is a relationship — it's a marriage or a close relationship. For me, my relationships with the band is more important than the band. If my relationship with Vito isn't straight then there's no point in trying to write and make music together. I can make music on my own, I don't need to deal with Vito. But if we're going to make music we're going to have to talk about some stuff, and that has to come first."

After the band announced its reunion in 2019, Andruzzi provided some insight regarding the atmosphere during their last tour prior to their split:

Just over six years ago we played a run of three shows in a row at the same venue capping off a very long run of shows. At the time we never thought we would play again. Some of the vibes were amazing, others not so good. I thought we played really really well, the audience was fantastic and full of love and we felt lucky every night to be onstage. [...] Yet, each night our talented and inimitable frontman left the stage and the venue without saying goodbye as the rest of us continued to play on (we ended our set every night with the instrumental outro of "How Deep Is Your Love"). There was a deep schism; at night we weren't on speaking terms with Luke yet during the day we were arguing about how to and if we should announce our break up. It was a weird, energized, positive and simultaneously shitty time.

=== Post-split activity (2014–18) ===
In June 2014, Vito Roccoforte and Gabriel Andruzzi released Moon Temple, their debut EP as Vito & Druzzi. Moon Temple would also become the name of Andruzzi's solo project, which released the two EPs Moon Temple I and Moon Temple II in 2016. Andruzzi and Roccoforte have also collaborated as Mother of Mars, releasing the single "Seed 2 Sky" in 2018.

Besides participating in Atomic Bomb! The Music of William Onyeabor, Luke Jenner learned production from Joakim Bouaziz, and was a guest vocalist on the latter's track "Bring Your Love" from the 2014 album Tropics of Love.

In 2015, Roccoforte formed Body Music, a duo with DJ and producer Benjamin "Bosq" Woods of Whiskey Barons. They released their debut EP Just One in 2017.

In 2017, Jenner reiterated that he was still a member of The Rapture, and that whether or not the band would continue was up to Roccaforte. "I would love to do the Rapture again, at this point it's just up to Vito. He lives like a block away from here," he said. "I still consider myself in the band. I have songs where I'm like, 'This is a Rapture song.' I could make it for myself, but also it's a Rapture song. My voice is so specific, it's really easily identifiable. I'm sorta waiting on a phone call from Vito, saying, 'Okay I'm ready to do stuff.'"

That same year, Jenner released the Sunrise EP as Meditation Tunnel, The name Meditation Tunnel comes from a children's toy and was chosen by Jenner for his solo project because Manfredi Romano a.k.a. DJ Tennis, who released the EP, forbade him to use his own name.

In 2018, Jenner started the band Seedy Films with three friends whose taste he admired but had never played music before. Explaining the idea behind the band, Jenner said, "I really relate to how Brian Eno was more of a thinker than a musician. I mean, he makes some amazing music, but he has really great ideas. I have this idea that you can teach people techniques, but you can't teach them taste. I've been in so many bands that had questionable taste and it always ends badly. Because saying you don't like someone's taste is like saying you don't like someone's face. You can't change your taste, really; you can hone it, but you like what you like. So I had these three people I was already friends with who had really great taste, and I asked them if they wanted to play music. So I started teaching them and we put together this band. Writing songs is the easy part for me, so I taught them how to write songs and I play drums in the band because… why not? I've already done everything else. So that's really fun.

In early 2018, Gabriel Andruzzi said, "I've talked to Luke recently, but there is nothing specific in the works. Thus I cannot report anything one way or another regarding The Rapture. I remain optimistic, and I must say that I always love playing shows with that band."

Roccoforte also started playing shows with Wah Together, a new rock band which also consists of guitarist Steve Schiltz (Longwave, bassist Phil Mossman LCD Soundsystem and vocalist Jaiko Suzuki. On 5 September 2018, Annie Nightingale debuted some of their songs on her BBC Radio 1 show. Roccoforte and Safer also reunited as the rhythm section for the new live format of Poolside. Poolside co-founder Jeffrey Paradise said in a statement, "Vito and Mattie are the backbone and rhythm section from one of my favorite bands ever: The Rapture. They've been big influences on my musical career over the years. It's super inspiring to play together with such great people with amazing musical chemistry. The punch they add to the music is unmistakable.”

=== Reunion (2019–2021) ===
In February 2019, Jenner announced via Facebook that The Rapture would be reuniting. The band's first show back is to be at the Music Hall of Williamsburg on April 30, followed by an appearance at the Just Like Heaven festival in Long Beach on May 4 alongside Phoenix, the Yeah Yeah Yeahs and MGMT.

In a statement, Jenner explained the group's reunion after over five years:

It's been this long gritty road trying to figure out how to be a father and a husband which seemed a lot more important than standing on stage in front of anyone. We went to therapy, we talked it out, it's still a little weird, but I couldn't do it if I didn't feel like it was gonna be some kinda personal progress. Anyway, I hope there is a long future for us and we can build something new. Maybe you will join us someplace along the way again.

Both Roccoforte and Andruzzi confirmed their participation in the reunion via social media, as did Harris Klahr who would be resuming bass-playing duties for the band's live shows that he had assumed after Safer's departure. In response to a question on Twitter, Safer confirmed that he was not participating in the reunion. In a subsequent Instagram post, Safer stated that he "would love the opportunity to get up and play those songs again, but I wasn't asked," but that he was "super psyched on [his] new band Safer, new label Cell Laboratories and playing Poolside."

The Rapture has been on an indefinite hiatus since their 2020 reunion shows were cancelled due to the COVID-19 pandemic. Since then, members have all pursued different projects. Luke Jenner is now a professional life coach, and in 2023, he stated that he was not in communication with his bandmates and he is no longer recording music. Meanwhile, Roccoforte and Andruzzi released I Hear, Mother of Mars' debut album in collaboration with vocalist Jaiko Suzuki, on March 5, 2021.

=== Second reunion (2025–present) ===
A second reunion was announced on July 8, 2025, with an US and European tour set to start in September 2025. Roccoforte and Andruzzi are not set to be included in the reunion, with Sam Bey of The Parlor Mob and Conor Kenahan on drums and bass respectively instead.

== In popular culture ==
- "Out of the Races and Onto the Tracks" featured in the film adaptation of Bret Easton Ellis novel The Rules of Attraction.
- "Echoes" plays in a scene of the film Superbad and is the opening theme for the E4 television series Misfits.
- "The Devil" plays in a scene during the episode "Rocket Club" in the television series Aliens in America.
- “Killing” was featured in the 2005 video game True Crime: New York City.
- "Whoo! Alright, Yeah…Uh Huh" is the official anthem for New York Red Bulls of Major League Soccer. The same song is used on the EA sports game Madden 2007, under the name "W.A.Y.U.H".
- "The Sound" was featured in the video game Need for Speed: ProStreet song was also used in an episode of CSI in 2007.
- "No Sex for Ben" is featured in The Music of Grand Theft Auto IV a soundtrack that is bundled with the special edition version of Grand Theft Auto IV. This song was number 26 on Rolling Stone's list of the 100 Best Songs of 2008. The song was also featured on the third-season premiere of Gossip Girl and was a major hit in Australia.
- "How Deep Is Your Love?" is used in an episode of the British teen drama Skins in 2012.
- "House of Jealous Lovers" is featured in the NBA 2K15 video game, an episode of the British comedy-drama This Is Going to Hurt as well as an episode of Showtime's Super Pumped: The Battle for Uber.
- "Pieces of the People We Love" is used as the opening track for Tales from the Borderlands's episode 3 "Catch a Ride".

== Members ==
Current members

- Luke Jenner – vocals, guitar (1998–2008, 2008–2013, 2019–2021, 2025–present)

Touring members

- Conor Kenahan – bass (2025–present)
- Sam Bey – drums (2025–present)

Former members

- Brooks Bonstin – bass guitar (1998–2000)
- Christopher Relyea – keyboards (1998–2000)
- Mattie Safer – vocals (1999–2009), bass guitar (2000–2009)
- Vito Roccoforte – drums (1998–2013, 2019–2021)
- Gabriel Andruzzi – keyboards, saxophone, percussion (2002–2013, 2019–2021), bass guitar (2009–2013)
- Harris Klahr – bass guitar, backing vocals, keyboards (2010–2013, 2019–2021; touring)

== Discography ==
Studio albums

- Echoes (2003)
- Pieces of the People We Love (2006)
- In the Grace of Your Love (2011)
