= Numero Group discography =

The Numero Group is an American archival/reissue record label formed in 2002. In the twenty years since the label's establishment, they have released hundreds of releases ranging from soul and funk to punk rock and pop to ambient and electronica.

Many of these releases are separated into sub-labels, with each sub-label having a different catalog number format to differentiate them (200 Line releases have cat. #s in the 200s, 500 Line releases have cat. #s in the 500s, etc).

== Discography ==
=== Uncategorized ===
Releases not categorized under a specific line of releases.

Year	Artist	Name	Catalog #	Note
2004	Antena	Camino Del Sol	002	
2005	Fern Jones	The Glory Road	005	
2013	Nathan Phillips	3 'N The Mourning	009	Mixtape made by Numero staff for Record Store Day
2013	Jon Kirby	The Deep End / Wasted Grace	010	Mixtape made by Numero staff for Record Store Day
2013	Various Artists	Dustin Drase: Celestial Incantations	011	Mixtape made by Numero staff for Record Store Day
2014	Catherine Howe	What A Beautiful Place	012	
2007	Various Artists	Home Schooled: The ABCs of Kid Soul	016	
2008	Various Artists	Don't Stop: Recording Tap	019	
2008	The Final Solution	Brotherman OST	022	
2009	24-Carat Black	Gone: The Promises of Yesterday	025	
2009	Pisces	A Lovely Sight	029	
2010	Al Jarnow	Celestial Navigations: The Short Films of Al Jarnow	031	
2010	Syl Johnson	Complete Mythology 1959-1972	032	
2010	Syl Johnson	Do You Know What Soul Is?	032.2	
	Syl Johnson	My Funky Funky Band	032.4	
2009	Various Artists	Light: On The South Side	033	
	Various Artists	Lizard!	034B	
2011	Various Artists	Boddie Recording Company: Cleveland, Ohio	035	
2011	The Mod Squad	Live from Trejval Dairy, 1969	035 3/4	
	Various Artists	Boddie: Fourth Class Disc	035B	
2014	Father's Children	Who's Gonna Save The World	037	
2011	Willie Wright	Telling The Truth	038	
2012	Lou Ragland	I Travel Alone	042	
	Love Apple	Love Apple	042.5	
	Trinikas	"Black Is Beautiful" b/w "Remember Me"	045.39	
2012	Alfonso Lovo	La Gigantona	046	
	Robert Soden	Cities of Darkscorch	048G	
2013	Medusa	First Step Beyond	048.5	
2013	Iasos	Celestial Soul Portrait	049	
2013	Various Artists	Purple Snow: Forecasting the Minneapolis Sound	050	
2023	Mind & Matter	1514 Oliver Avenue (Basement)	050 1/2	
	Twin City Rappers	Twin City Rap	50.75	
2014	Ned Doheny	Separate Oceans	052	
2014	Ned Doheny	"Get It Up For Love" b/w "Whatcha Gonna Do For Me"	052.5	
2015	Ned Doheny	"To Prove My Love" b/w "Instrumental"	052.75	
2016	Various Artists	Bobo Yéyé: Belle Époque In Upper Volta	055	
2016	Echo Del Africa National	Récit Historique De Bobo Dioulasso	055B	
2015	Various Artists	Ultra-High Frequencies: The Chicago Party	056	
2015	Universal Togetherness Band	Universal Togetherness Band	057	
2014	Jordan De La Sierra	Gymnosphere: Song of the Rose	059	
2015	Various Artists	Ork Records: New York, New York	060	
2016	The Feelies	"The Boy with the Perpetual Nervousness" b/w "My Little Red Book"	060B	
2015	The Edge of Daybreak	Eyes of Love	061	
2015	The Royal Jesters	English Oldies	062	
2017	The Creation	Action Painting	064	
2018	Various Artists	Technicolor Paradise: Rhum Rhapsodies & Other Exotic Delights	065	
2016	Various Artists	Afterschool Special: The 123s of Kid Soul	066	
2017	Jackie Shane	Any Other Way	067	
2016	Joanna Brouk	Hearing Music	069	
2022	Blondie	Against the Odds: 1974-1982	070	
2021	Female Species	Tale of My Lost Love	073	
2018	Various Artists	Teen Expo: The Cleopatra Label	074	
2018	Various Artists	Basement Beehive: The Girl Group Underground	075	
2020	Tommy McGee	I'm A Stranger	076	
2021	Pastor T. L. Barrett & The Youth For Christ Choir	I Shall Wear A Crown	077	
2021	Various Artists	Driftless Dreamers: In Cuca Country	078	
2018	Laraaji	Vision Songs - Vol. 1	079	
2022	Various Artists	Bound For Hell: On The Sunset Strip	080	
	Various Artists	Bound For Hell: Reel Fire	080.1	
2022	Branko Mataja	Over Fields And Mountains	082	
2023	Joyce Steet	Tied Down	083	
2023	Maxx Traxx/Third Rail	Maxx Traxx/Third Rail	084	
2024	Margo Guryan	Words and Music	085	
	Margo Guryan	Chopsticks Variations	085.1	
2024	The Mystic Tide	Frustration	086	
2025	Harvey Scales	Trying to Survive	087	
2024	Charles Brown	I Just Want To Talk To You	088	
2024	Various Artists	Bliss Out For Days	089	
2023	Various Artists	Skyway Soul: Gary, Indiana	090	
2026	Various Artists	The Magic Touch Label, Vol. 1	094	
2005	The Curtis Liggins Indications	"Funky Monkey Right On" b/w "What It Is?"	102	
2024	Andwella	To Dream	112	
2022	Various Artists	Penny & The Quarters & Friends	115	
2026	Cathy Hamer	Lady Full of Dreams	123	
2024	Various Artists	Cosmic American Music: Motel California	158	
2023	Laraaji	Seque to Infinity	179	
	Laraaji	Glimpses of Infinity	179G	
2023	Isabelle Antena	En Cavate	192	
2023	Peter Barclay	I'm Not Your Toy	193	
2022	Various Artists	V4 Visions: Of Love & Andriods	194	
2020	24-Carat Black	III	196	
2019	Gary Davenport	Scattered Thoughts	197	
2018	Various Artists	Switched-On Eugene	198	
2018	Happy Rhodes	Ectotrophia	199	
2023	Unwound	Unwound: 1991 - 2091	491	
2016	Various Artists	19	1900	
2026	Various Artists	Ken Shipley's Pro Skater 2	1901	Limited edition compilation made for Jejune/Ethel Meserve/The Album Leaf's 2026 Japan tour
2026	Various Artists	Space Jams	1902	Limited edition compilation made for Jejune/Ethel Meserve/The Album Leaf's 2026 Japan tour
	Various Artists	An Alternate History of Popular Music	2011	
	Various Artists	2533	2533	
2024	Everyone Asked About You	7" Bundle (NUM723 + NUM737)	EAAY	
2023	Various Artists	Numero Twenty	n/a	
2021	Alan Dunham	Flying Alone		
2024	Various Artists	The Psychologically Ultimate 220 Year Cicada Super Bloom		

=== 200 Line ===
Mainly focused on punk/punk adjacent artists.

Year	Artist	Release	Catalog #
2017	Hüsker Dü	Savage Young Dü	200
2012	Codeine	When I See The Sun	201
	Codeine	Frigid Stars LP	201.1
	Codeine	Barely Real	201.2
	Codeine	The White Birch	201.3
	Codeine	"Pickup Song (live)" b/w "New Year's (live)"	201.4
	Codeine	What About The Lonely?	201.5
2024	Codeine	Bigheads Burst	201.6
2016	Unwound	What Was Wound	202
2013	Giant Henry	Big Baby	202.1
2013	Unwound	Kid Is Gone	202.2
	Unwound	7/26/2001	202.2B
2014	Unwound	Rat Conspiracy	202.3
2014	Unwound	No Energy	202.4
2014	Unwound	6/30/1999: Reykjavík, Iceland	202.4B
2015	Unwound	Empire	202.5
	Unwound	Peel Sessions	202.5B
2015	Scharpling & Wurster	The Best of The Best Show	203
2016	White Zombie	It Came From N.Y.C.	204
2016	Blonde Redhead	Masculin Féminin	205
	Blonde Redhead	Peel Sessions	205.3
2016	The Scientists	A Place Called Bad	206
2017	Noise Addict	10,000 Kids With Guitars	207
2017	Crimpshrine	Free Box	208
2017	Super Static Fever	Silent Dynamic Torture	209
2019	Duster	Capsule Losing Contact	210
2023	Charlie Megira	Tomorrow's Gone	211
2019	Indian Summer	Giving Birth To Thunder	212
2019	Valium Aggelein	Black Moon	213
2022	Current	Yesterday's Tomorrow Is Not Today	214
2023	Karate	Complete Studio Recordings	215
2025	Karate	If You Can Hold Your Breath	215.1
2022	Karate	Time Expired	215.2
2023	Native Nod	This Can't Exist	216
2023	Everyone Asked About You	Paper Airplanes, Paper Hearts	217
2023	Pot Valiant	Never Return	218
2023	C-Clamp	Dream Backwards	219
2022	The Hated	Best Piece of Shit Vol. 4	220.1
2024	The Hated	Flux	220.5
2024	The Hated	The Best Piece of Shit Vol. 5	220.5B
2024	Universal Order of Armageddon	Universal Order of Armageddon	221
2026	Antioch Arrow	Your Hearts Belong To Us	222
2025	Clikitat Ikatowi	The Trials and Tribulations of...	223
2024	Majesty Crush	Butterflies Don't Go Away	224
2025	Various Artists	Sequoia	225
2024	90 Day Men	We Blame Chicago	226
2024	90 Day Men	Orbit to Orbit	226.1
2024	Boys Life	Home Is A Highway	227
2025	Boilermaker	Not Enough Time To Get Anything Halfway Done	228
	Boilermaker	Whitewash	228.1
2024	The American Analog Set	New Drifters	229
2024	Tsunami	Loud Is As	230
2026	Ida	I Know About You	231.2
2025	Ida	Will You Find Me	231.4
2025	Lovesliescrushing	Bloweyelashwish	232
2026	Mineral	Might As Well Be Here	234
2026	Geoff Farina	FFF	235
2026	The American Analog Set	Destroy! Destroy! Destroy!	239
2025	Hüsker Dü	1985: The Miracle Year	250

=== 300 Line ===
Year	Artist	Release	Catalog #
	Duster	Together	301
	Duster	Duster	302
2023	Eiafuawn	Birds in the Ground	303
2024	Canaan Amber	CA	304
2024	Karate	Make It Fit	305
	Duster	In Dreams	306
2025	The Exploration	Demography	307

=== 500 Line ===
Focused on funk/soul.

Year	Artist	Release	Catalog #
2021	Various Artists	REACH	500
2023	Various Artists	Eccentric Funk	501
2020	Various Artists	Indications Inspirations Vol. 1	502
2022	Various Artists	Eccentric Disco	503
2021	Various Artists	Christmas Dreamers: Yuletide Country (1960-1972)	504
2022	Various Artists	Ebriac All Stars	505
2022	Various Artists	Eccentric Deep Soul	506
2023	Various Artists	Eccentric Northern Soul	507
2023	Various Artists	If There's Hell Below...	508
2023	Various Artists	Eccentric Boogie	509
2024	Various Artists	Beehive Breaks	510
2024	Various Artists	You're Not From Around Here	511
2024	Various Artists	They Move In The Night	512
2025	Various Artists	Walk Don't Run	513
2024	Various Artists	Soft Summer Breezes	516
2025	Various Artists	Call Me Old Fashioned	517
	Various Artists	Eccentric Modern Soul	520
2026	Various Artists	Eccentric Sweet Soul	521
2026	Various Artists	Eccentric Folk Soul	523
2025	Various Artists	Eccentric Spiritual Soul	524
2025	Various Artists	The Style of Life	532
2025	Various Artists	Great Lakes Gospel: Cleveland	535
2026	Various Artists	Great Lakes Gospel: Detroit	536
2024	Various Artists	Haunted Presence	566
2025	Various Artists	Barnyard Beehive	575

=== 600 Line ===
Year	Artist	Release	Catalog #
	Birdlegs & Pauline	S/T	602
	Bailey's Nervous Kats	The Nervous Kats	603
	Helene Smith	I Am Controlled By Your Love	604
	Barbara Stant	My Mind Holds On To Yesterday	605
	Modesto Duran & Orchestra	Fabulous Rhythms of Modesto	606
	The Chieftones	The New Smooth and Different Sound	607
	Margo Guryan	Take A Picture	608
	Margo Guryan	28 Demos	609
2026	Mickey & The Soul Generation	Give Everybody Some	610
2026	Andwellas Dream	Love & Poetry	612
	The Lijadu Sisters	Danger	651
	The Lijadu Sisters	Horizon Unlimited	653
	Doug Firebaugh	Performance One	655
	Jimmy Jules & The Nuclear Soul System	Xmas Done Got Funky	656
2026	Alejandro Bravo	Alejandro Bravo	658
2025	Stan Hubbs	Crystal	660

=== 700 Line ===
Focused on punk, usually issued as 7"s.

Year	Artist	Release	Catalog #
2012	Pretty	Mustache In Your Face	701
2012	Wicked Lester	You Are Doomed	702
2012	The Cave Dwellers	Run Around	703
2013	Hüsker Dü	Amusement	704
2014	Dinosaur Jr.	Visitors	705
2014	Little Boys Blues	Nothing Left To Say	706
2015	Various Artists	Ork Records: Complete Singles	707
2015	Medusa	Temptress/Strangulation	708
2016	Cheap Nasties	53rd and 3rd	709
2017	White Zombie	Gods on Voodoo Moon	710
2017	The Creation	Making Time	711
2017	Flying Wedge	Come To My Casbah/I Can't Believe	712
2017	Johnny Knight	Rock & Roll Guitar/Snake Shake	713
2017	Hüsker Dü	Extra Circus	714
2018	The Scientists	The Scientists E.P.	715
2018	Bernadette Carroll	Laughing On The Outside/Heavenly	716
2020	Blue Tandem	Fleetwood Jack	717
2021	Seam	Days of Thunder	719
2021	Elyse Weinberg/Dinosaur Jr.	Houses	720
2023	Duster	Moods, Modes	721
2022	Charlie Megira	Yesterday, Today And Tomorrow/Tomorrow's Gone	722
2024	Everyone Asked About You	Never Leave	723
2023	Codeine	"3 Angels" b/w "Pea"	724
2023	Unwound/Karate	Fantasma	725
2023	The Belles	"Melvin" b/w "Come Back"	726
2023	The Contessas	"Broken Heart" b/w "Gimme Gimme"	727
2023	Vickie and the Van Dykes	"I Wanna Be A Winner" b/w "Outcast"	728
2023	Canaan Amber	"Take Off Your Face" b/w "Create The Scene (Instrumental)"	729
2024	Skullcrusher/The Hated	"Words Come Back"	730
2024	Codeine/Bedhead	"Atmosphere" b/w "Disorder"	731
	Happy Rhodes/Marissa Nadler	"Where Do I Go On"	732
	Pelican	"Gasoline" b/w "For Your Entertainment"	733
2025	Beach Fossils/Current Joys	"Inside Out" / "Cooking"	734
2024	Everyone Asked About You	Never Leave	735
2024	Unwound/Steel Pole Bathtub	Split	736
2024	Everyone Asked About You	"Sometimes Memory Fails Me Sometimes" b/w "Handsome, Beautiful"	737
2024	The Hated	"T.S. Eliot" b/w "Summer Down"	738
2023	Margo Guryan	"I Ought To Stay Away From You" b/w "Why Do I Cry"	739
2024	Duster & Dirty Art Club	"Anhedonia" b/w "Ectasy Cowgirl"	740
2025	Various Artists	Sycamore	750
2025	Unwound	"New Energy" b/w "Petals Like Bricks"	751
2025	Loveliescrushing	Youreyesimmaculate	752
	Ethel Meserve	Demo	754
	The Tweeds/Joseph Washington Jr.	"I Need That Record" b/w "Shopping"	799

=== 800 Line ===
Focused on music released during the 1980's.

Year	Artist	Release	Catalog #
2018	Spontaneous Overflow	All About Money	801
2019	Antena	Camino Del Sol	802
2019	New World Music	Intellectual Thinking	803
2019	Hamlet Minassian	Armenian Pop Music	804
2019	Rupa	Disco Jazz	805
2019	Don Slepian	Sea of Bliss	806
2019	Chasman	Synth-E-Fuge	807
2019	Elisa Waut	Elisa Waut	808
2020	Dhaima	Love Lives Forever	809
2019	Joanna Brouk	The Space Between	810
2020	Masumi Hara	夢の4倍	811
2022	Archie James Cavanaugh	Black and White Raven	812
	Andre Gibson & Universal Togetherness Band	Apart: Demos 1980-84	813
2022	Jeff Phelps	Magnetic Eyes	814
2023	Joanna Brouk	Sounds of the Sea	815
2025	Super Djata Band	Volume 2	816
2025	Vazz	Your Lungs and Your Tongues	817
2024	Tony Palkovic	Born With A Desire	818
	Rick Cuevas	Symbolism	819
2024	The Scientists	You Get What You Deserve!	820
2026	Z-Factor and Jesse Saunders	Dance Party Album	822
	Super Djata Band	Authentique Vol. 2 Feu Vert 81-82	824
2026	Gigi Masin	Wind (40th Anniversary Edition)	889

=== 900 Line ===
Focused on more experimental artists released during the 1990's, often slowcore and punk.

Year	Artist	Release	Catalog #
2022	Codeine	Dessau	900
2021	Blonde Redhead	Blonde Redhead	901
2021	Blonde Redhead	La Mia Vita Violenta	902
2022	Karate	Karate	903
2021	Karate	In Place of Real Insight	904
2022	Karate	The Bed is in The Ocean	905
2023	Karate	Unsolved	906
2023	Karate	Some Boots	907
2026	Karate	Pockets	908
2021	Karate	595	909
2021	Seam	Headsparks	910
2021	Various Artists	V4 Visions Label Sampler	911
2021	Charlie Megira	Da Abtomatic Meisterzinger Mambo Chic	912
2022	Rex	C	913
2022	Charlie Megira	The Hefker Girl	914
2023	Chisel	Set You Free	915
2023	Codeine	Frigid Stars	916
2023	Codeine	Barely Real	917
2023	Codeine	The White Birch	918
	The American Analog Set	The Golden Band	919
2024	Ozean	Ozean	920
2022	Charlie Megira & The Modern Dance Club	Love Police	921
2025	X-Cetra	Summer 2000 (Y2K 25th Anniversary Edition)	922
2024	Clikatat Ikatowi	S/T Demo	923
2023	Duster	Remote Echoes	924
2023	Duster	Stratosphere (25th Anniversary Edition)	925
2025	90 Day Men	(It Is It) Critical Band (Y2K 25th Anniversary Edition)	927
2025	Tacoma Radar	No One Waved Goodbye	928
	The American Analog Set	The Fun of Watching Fireworks	929
	Charlie Megira	End of Teenage	930
2025	Charlie Megira	Boom Chaka Boom Boom	931
2025	Should	Feed Like Fishes	932
2026	Macha / Bedhead	Macha Loved Bedhead	933
2025	Jejune	Junk	936
2025	Jejune	This Afternoons Malady	937
2025	Julie Dolron	Broken Girl	941
2025	Julie Dolron	Loneliest in the Morning	942
2026	The Album Leaf	One Day I'll Be On Time (25 Year Anniversary)	994

==== Hand-Screened ====
A series of releases "hand-screened" in limited numbers.

Year	Artist	Release	Catalog #
2026	September	4812 Alexandria	950
2024	Frail	No Industry	951
2025	The Pennikurvers	Dying To Tell	952
2025	The Album Leaf	Lines in a Leaf	953
2025	The Lazarus Plot	Something Good Has Got To Come Out Of All Of These Goodbyes	954
2025	Eldritch Anisette	Complete Fairytales	955
2025	Winds of Change	God How We Tried To Lie	956
2026	Carpe Diem	Trust Little to Tomorrow	957
TBA	Bells on Trike	There Went Nothing	958
2026	Patterns Make Sunrise	Patterns Make Sunrise	959
2025	Don Martin Three	To Sketch An Arrow	960
2026	Endive	Dead Roses	961
2026	Thumbnail/Harriet The Spy	Split LP	962
2026	Cars Get Crushed	Warped Speed	964

==== Tiger Style ====
A series of reissues of specifically releases from Tiger Style Records after Numero gained rights to the label's releases.

Year	Artist	Release	Catalog #
2025	The Appleseed Cast	Two Conversations	935
2025	Her Space Holiday	Home Is Where You Hang Yourself (Y2K 25th Anniversary Edition)	990
2025	The Mercury Program	From The Vapor of Gasoline (Y2K Edition)	991
2025	Tristeza	Dream Signals in Full Circles	992

=== 1200 Line ===
Formerly known as JR. Name was changed in 2014 to the 1200 Line.

Year	Artist	Release	Catalog #
2012	Shoes	One In Versailles	JR 001 (1201)
2012	Shoes	Bazooka	JR 002 (1202)
2012	Shoes	Black Vinyl Shoes	JR 003 (1203)
2012	Shoes	Pre-Tense: Demos 1978-1979	JR.-004 (1204)
2012	Circuit Rider	Circuit Rider	JR 005 (1205)
2013	The Lewis Connection	The Lewis Connection	JR 006 (1206)
2013	Syl Johnson	Dresses Too Short	JR 007 (1207)
2013	Syl Johnson	Is It Because I'm Black (Deluxe 50th Anniversary Edition)	JR 008 (1208)
2013	Otis G. Johnson	Everything: God is Love 78	JR 009 (1209)
2013	Rokk	I Want To Live High	JR 010 (1210)
2013	Centaura	Lawdy, Lawdy, Lawd	JR 011 (1211)
2013	The Sixth Station	Deep Night	JR 012 (1212)
2013	The Four Mints	Gently Down Your Stream	JR 013 (1213)
2013	Kathy Heideman	Move With Love	JR 014 (1214)
2014	Family Circle	Family Circle	JR 015 (1215)
2014	Josefus	Dead Man	JR 016 (1216)
2014	Nikki Sudden	Waiting On Egypt	JR 017 (1217)
2014	Nikki Sudden	The Bible Belt	JR 018 (1218)
2013	Nikki Sudden & Dave Kusworth	Jacobites	JR 019 (1219)
2013	Nikki Sudden & Dave Kusworth	Robespierre's Velvet Basement	JR 020 (1220)
2014	Nikki Sudden & The Jacobites	Texas	JR 021 (1221)
2014	Nikki Sudden & Rowland S. Howard	Kiss You Kidnapped Charabanc	JR 022 (1222)
2014	Nikki Sudden & The Jacobites	Dead Men Tell No Tales	JR 023 (1223)
2014	Solaris	The Waves of the Evernow	1224
2014	The Montgomery Express	The Montgomery Movement	1225
2015	Jeff Cowell	Lucky Strikes and Liquid Gold	1226
2014	Bulbous Creation	You Won't Remember Dying	1227
2014	Sensational Saints	You Won't Believe It	1228
2014	Nikki Sudden	Dark Rags at Dawn	1229
2015	White Eyes	White Eyes	1230
2015	Alan Watts	This Is It	1231
2015	The Notations	Still Here: 1967-1973	1232
2015	The Scientists	The Scientists	1233
2015	The Scientists	Blood Red River	1234
2022	Wee	You Can Fly On My Aeroplane	1235
2017	Crimpshrine	Duct Tape Soup	1236
	Various Artists	East Bay Sampler	1236.5
2017	Chrmpshrine	The Sound of a New World Being Born	1237
2015	Bedhead	Live 1998	1238
2014	Bedhead	WhatFunLifeWas	1239
2014	Bedhead	Beheaded	1240
2014	Bedhead	Transaction De Novo	1241
2014	Bedhead	1992-1998	1242
2015	Syl Johnson	Complete Twinight Records 45s	1243
2015	Boscoe	Boscoe	1244
2018	Joseph Washington, Jr.	Merry Christmas To You From Joseph	1245
2016	Rob Galbraith	Damn It All	1246
	Master Wilburn Burchette	Burchette Bundle	1247
	Master Wilburn Burchette	Occult Concert	1247.1
2024	Master Wilburn Burchette	Opens The Seven Gates of Transcendental Consiousness	1247.2
2016	Master Wilburn Burchette	Guitar Grimoire	1247.3
2016	Master Wilburn Burchette	Music of the Godhead for Supernatural Meditation	1247.5
2016	Master Wilburn Burchette	Transcendental Music For Meditation	1247.6
2016	Master Wilburn Burchette	Mindstorm	1247.7
2016	Arrogance	Knights of Dreams	1248
2015	Various Artists	Entertainment (Music from the Motion Picture Soundtrack)	1249
2016	94 East	The Cookhouse Five	1250
2016	Jimmy Carter & The Dallas Country Green	Summer Brings The Sunshine	1251
2016	The Chapells	Are You Ready?	1252
2016	Tucker Zimmerman	Song Poet	1253
2016	Various Artists	First Annual Inner-City Talent Expo	1254
2016	Circuit Rider	Photograph Attached	1255
2016	Tommy McGee	Positive-Negative	1256
2016	Pisces	Somewhere In Your Mind	1257
2016	Meic Stevens	Outlander	1258
2023	Shira Small	The Line of Time and the Plane of Now	1261
	Allan Wachs	Mountain Roads & City Streets	1262
2018	Eula Cooper	Let Our Love Grow Higher	1263
	Ponderosa Twins + 1	2+2+1=	1264
	Otis Brown	South Side Chicago	1265
	Blondie	"Yuletide Throwdown"	1266
2018	Blondie	"Heart of Glass"	1267
2022	Sanford Clark	They Call Me Country	1268
2021	Pastor T.L. Barrett	Do Not Pass Me By	1269
2021	Pastor T.L. Barrett	Do Not Pass Me By Vol. II	1270
2021	Pastor T. L. Barrett and The Youth For Christ Choir	Like A Ship... (Without A Sail)	1271
	The Creation	We Are Paintermen	1272
	Trey Gruber	Herculean House of Cards	1273
2021	A.R.T. Wilson	Overworld	1274
2023	Duster	1975	1275
2022	Le Super Djata Band Du Mali	En Super Forme Vol. 1	1276
2023	Chuck Senrick	Dreamin'	1277
2022	Volta-Jazz	Air Volta	1278
2025	The Majestic Arrows	The Magic of the Majestic Arrows	1279
2024	Sandy Harless	Songs	1280
2024	Skip Mahoney and the Causals	Your Funny Moods (50th Anniverary Edition)	1281
2024	D.R. Hooker	The Truth	1282
2021	Catherine Howe	What A Beautiful Place (50th Anniversary Edition)	1283
	Hot Chocolate	S/T	1284
2022	Lou Ragland	Is The Conveyor "Understand Each Other"	1285
2022	Duster	Stratosphere	1286
2022	Duster	Contemporary Movement	1287
2018	The Scientists	Weird Love	1288
2022	Unwound	Unwound	1290
2023	Unwound	Fake Train	1291
2018	Unwound	New Plastic Ideas	1292
2019	Unwound	The Future of What	1293
2020	Unwound	Repetition	1294
2021	Unwound	Challenge for a Civilized Society	1295
2023	Unwound	Leaves Turn Inside You	1296
2024	Unwound	A Single History: 1991–1997	1297
2023	Unwound	Live Leaves (10 Year Anniversary Edition)	1298

=== 5000 Line ===
Year	Artist	Release	Catalog #
	Johnny Lunchbreak	"Appetizer" b/w "Soup's On"	5001
	Propinquity	Propinquity	5003
	Caroline Peyton	Mock Up	5006
	Caroline Peyton	Intuition	5007
	La Solución	Desde Mi Barrio en Chicago	5259
	Eugene Viscone	Christmas Feelings	5287cass
	Pastor T.L. Barrett & The Youth For Christ Choir	"Jingle Bells"	5415

=== Asterisk ===
Focus on "high-quality acts so obscure only friends and family remember them".

Year	Artist	Release	Catalog #
2007	Johnny Lunchbreak	Appetizer/Soup's On	NUM-AST1
2007	The Four Mints	Gently Down Your Stream	NUM-AST2
2007	Propinquity	Propinquity	NUM-AST3
2007	Boscoe	Boscoe	NUM-AST4
2008	Wee	You Can Fly On My Aeroplane	NUM-AST5
2009	Caroline Peyton	Mock-Up	NUM-AST6
	Caroline Peyton	Intuition	NUM-AST7
2011	Spirit Free	Plays Starship	NUM-AST8
2012	Los Nombres	Los Nombres	NUM-AST9

=== Buttons ===
Focused on power pop.

Year	Artist	Release	Catalog #
2004	Various Artists	Yellow Pills: Prefill (later reissued as Buttons: Starter Kit)	004
2008	Various Artists	Titan: It's All Pop!	024
2012	Various Artists	Buttons: From Champaign to Chicago	044

=== Cult Cargo ===
Funk-focused series.

Year	Artist	Release	Catalog #
2005	Various Artists	Cult Cargo: Belize City Boil Up	006
2007	Various Artists	Cult Cargo: Grand Bahama Goombay	014
2011	Various Artists	Cult Cargo: Salsa Boricua De Chicago	036
2012	Alfonso Lovo	La Gigantona	046

=== Eccentric Soul ===
Soul, usually focused on a specific label or location.

Year	Artist	Release	Catalog #
2008	Various Artists	Eccentric Soul: The Capsoul Label	001
2004	Various Artists	Eccentric Soul: The Bandit Label	003
2015	Various Artists	Eccentric Soul: The Deep City Label	007
2008	Various Artists	Eccentric Soul: The Big Mack Label	009
2006	Various Artists	Eccentric Soul: Mighty Mike Lenaburg	011
2007	Various Artists	Eccentric Soul: Twinight's Lunar Rotation	013
2007	Various Artists	Eccentric Soul: The Prix Label	015
2007	Various Artists	Eccentric Soul: The Outskirts of Deep City	017
2024	Various Artists	Eccentric Soul: The Tragar & Note Labels	020
2008	Various Artists	Eccentric Soul: The Young Disciples	023
2013	Various Artists	Eccentric Soul: Smart's Palace	027
2011	Various Artists	Eccentric Soul: The Nickel & Penny Labels	039
2012	Various Artists	Eccentric Soul: A Red Black & Green Production	041
2012	Love Apple	Love Apple	042.5
2012	Various Artists	Eccentric Soul: The Dynamic Label	043
2012	Various Artists	Eccentric Soul: Minibus, Vol. 1	045
2023	Various Artists	Eccentric Soul: The Forte Label	047
2014	Various Artists	Eccentric Soul: Capital City Soul	051
2014	Various Artists	Eccentric Soul: The Way Out Label	053
2014	Various Artists	Eccentric Soul: The Way Out Label Bonus	053B
2016	Various Artists	Eccentric Soul: Sitting In The Park	063
2018	Various Artists	Eccentric Soul: The Saru Label	071
2022	Various Artists	Eccentric Soul: The Shiptown Label	081
2024	Various Artists	Eccentric Soul: The Tammy Label	091
2024	Various Artists	Eccentric Soul: Consolidated Productions Vol. 1	092
2024	Various Artists	Eccentric Soul: The Cobra Label	093
	Various Artists	Eccentric Soul: The Magic Touch Label	094
	Various Artists	Eccentric Soul: The Linco Label	095
2024	Various Artists	Eccentric Soul: The Shoestring Label	096
2024	Various Artists	Eccentric Soul: The Saadia Label	097
2024	Various Artists	Eccentric Soul: The Cuca Label	098
2025	Various Artists	Eccentric Spiritual Soul	524
2021	Otis Brown	Southside Chicago	1265
2016	Joseph Washington Jr.	Merry Christmas To You	
2016	The Chappells	Are You Ready For The Chappells?	
2017	The Commands	On Duty With...	
2018	Eula Cooper	Let Our Love Grow Higher	
2018	Step by Step	Time After Time	
2018	Barbara Stant	My Mind Holds On To Yesterday	
2019	The Mist	"The Girl In The Window" b/w "Life Walked Out"	
2020	Various Artists	Eccentric Soul: The Kris Label	
2020	Various Artists	Eccentric Soul: The Renfro Label	
2020	Various Artists	Eccentric Soul: The Path Label	

==== Eccentric Soul 45s ====
Sub-section of Eccentric Soul, 7" single releases.

Year	Artist	Release	Catalog #
2007	The Rollers	"Knockin' At The Wrong Door" b/w "Our Little Piece"	ES-001
2007	Eddie Ray	"Wait A Minute" b/w "Instrumental"	ES-002
2007	M.A.S.O.	"Poon Tang Thump Pt. 1" b/w "Pt. 2"	ES-003
2008	Renaldo Domino	"I'll Get You Back" b/w "Two Years Four Days"	ES-004
2008	The Triads	"Now I Can Hold My Head Up High" b/w "If You're Looking For Love"	ES-005
2008	Wee	"Try Me" b/w "Teach Me How"	ES-006
2010	Eddie & the Ant Hill Mob	"The Number Runner Pt. 1" b/w "Pt. 2"	ES-007
2015	Trevor Dandy	"Is There Any Love"	ES-008
2010	Various Artists	Boddie Acetate Box	ES 009-011
2010	The Four Mints	"No Longer" b/w "Endlessly"	ES-012
2010	The Deacons/The Royal Revue feat. the Fascinations	"Sock It To Me" b/w "Is It Because I'm Black"	ES-013
2011	Willie Wright	Telling The Truth	ES-014
2011	Little Ed & The Soundmasters	Little Ed & The Soundmasters	ES 015-017
2011	Penny and the Quarters	"You and Me" b/w "You Are Giving Me Some Other Love"	ES-018
2011	Reverb Ltd.	"Please Love Me"	ES-019
2011	Group From Lutheran East	"From The Files of Lonely Hearts"	ES-020
2011	Syl Johnson	Syl Johnson Single Box	ES 021-025
2011	Father's Children	"Intellect" b/w "Linda Movement"	ES-026
2012	Memphis Soul	"Don't Down Me People Pt. 1" b/w "Pt. 2"	ES-027
2012	Sidney Barnes	"The Ember Song" b/w "Greyhound Jingles"	ES-028
2012	Renee Acker	"If I Had A Magic Wand"	ES-029
2013	Signs of the Time	"Hurts So Bad"	ES-030
2013	The Notations	"This Time I'm For Real" b/w "That Girl"	ES-031
2013	James Dockery	"My Faith In You Is All Gone" b/w "Giving You The Love You Need"	ES-032
2013	Brown Bombers & Soul Partners	"Wait For Me"	ES-033
2013	Calvin Harris	"Love's Recipe" b/w "Wives Get Lonely Too"	ES-034
2013	The Young Souls	"Quit Waiting For Tomorrow To Come" b/w "Puppet On A String"	ES-035
2013	Flyte Tyme	"It's The Things That You Do" b/w "I've Got You On My Mind"	ES-036
2013	94 East	"If You See Me" b/w "Games"	ES-037
2013	Herman Jones	"I Love You" b/w "I'm Broke"	ES-038
2013	Master Plan Inc.	"Try It (You'll Like It)"	ES-039
2013	Unnatural Funk Band	"Strange Happenings" b/w "Living In The Past"	ES-040
2013	Bump and the Soul Stompers	"I Can Remember" b/w "Standing On The Outside"	ES-041
2013	Unknown Artist	"Cemetery"	ES-042
2014	Out of Sights	"Tears Don't Care Who Cries" b/w "For The Rest Of My Life"	ES-043
2014	Universal Togetherness Band	"Saturday Night" b/w "More Than Enough"	ES-044
2014	Donnell Pitman	"Burning Up" b/w "A Taste of Honey"	ES-045
2014	Jesus Wayne	"Chicago Party Theme"	ES-046
2014	Jesus Wayne	"Rush" b/w "You Bring Me Up"	ES-047
2015	Perk Badger (The Soul Percolator) with The Rising Sons	"Do Your Stuff"	ES-048
2015	Funka Fize	"Because You're Funky" b/w "No Words"	ES-049
2015	Otis Brown	"I've Got Another" b/w "Southside Chicago"	ES-050
2015	Mind & Matter	"I'm Under Your Spell" b/w "Sunshine Lady"	ES-051
2015	Universal Togetherness Band	"My Sentiment" b/w "Missing You"	ES-052
2015	The Shades	"Santa Claus Is Coming To Town" b/w "Prancer's Got Some Red Spots"	ES-053
2016	The Young Senators	"Jungle" b/w "That's The Way It Is"	ES-054
2016	The Young Senators	"Ringing Bells (Sweet Music)"	ES-055
2016	Dry Bread	"Yamar" b/w "Words To My Song"	ES-056
2016	Them Two	"Am I A Good Man" b/w "Love Has Taken Wings"	ES-057
2016	Tommy McGee	"Now That I Have You" b/w "Stay With Me"	ES-058
2017	Sonia Ross	"Let Me Be Free" b/w "Every Now and Then"	ES-059
2016	Amethyst	"Midnight Rendezvous"	ES-060
2017	LaVice & Company	"Two Sisters From Bagdad"	ES-061
2017	The Burnett Sisters	"I Meant Every Word" b/w "Teenage Widow"	ES-062
2017	Lion	"You've Got A Woman"	ES-063
2017	Kool Blues	"Can We Try Love Again" b/w "I Want To Be Ready"	ES-064
2018	Step By Step	"Time After Time" b/w "She's Gone"	ES-065
2018	Thelma Jones	"I Can't Stand It" b/w "Only Yesterday"	ES-066
2019	Universal Togetherness Band	"Dreamality" b/w "Lucky Stars"	ES-067
2019	The Elements	"Hey Lady" b/w "Just To Be With You"	ES-068
2019	Eula Cooper	"Try" b/w "Let Our Love Grow Higher"	ES-069
	Jackie Shane	"Any Other Way" b/w "Sticks and Stones"	ES-070
2020	Jim Spencer/Angie Jaree	"Wrap Myself Up In Your Love"	ES-071
2021	The Sweet and Innocent	"Express Your Love" b/w "Cry Love"	ES-072
2021	Syl Johnson	"Different Strokes" b/w "Is It Because I'm Black"	ES-073
2022	Junei'	"Let's Ride" b/w "You Must Go On"	ES-074
2022	Dan Boadi and the African Internationals	"Money Is The Root Of Evil" b/w "Duodu Wuo Ye Ya"	ES-075
2022	Cheryl Glasgow	"Glued To The Spot"	ES-076
2021	T. L. Barrett & The Youth For Christ Choir	"Like A Ship" b/w "Nobody Knows"	ES-077
2022	Rupa	"Moja Bhari Moja" b/w "East West Shuffle"	ES-078
2023	Greenflow	"I Got'Cha" b/w "No Other Life Without You"	ES-079
2023	Lucky Rosenbloom	"Keep Your Faith In God" b/w "Just Give It All To Christ"	ES-080
2022	The Soul Duo	"Just A Sad X-mas" b/w "Can't Love Me (Like My Baby Do)"	ES-081
2023	The Royal Jesters	"Take Me For A Little While" b/w "We Go Together"	ES-082
2023	The Dreamliners	"Just Me and You" b/w "Best Things In Live"	ES-083
2023	Dimas Garza	"I Won't Love You Again" b/w "So Funny"	ES-084
2023	Ponderosa Twins Plus One	"Bound" b/w "I Remember You"	ES-085
2023	Michael Dixon & J.O.Y.	"You're Everything" b/w "All I Need"	ES-086
2025	The Notations	"I'm Still Here" b/w "What More Can I Say"	ES-087
2023	LaJohn & Sheela	"Too Far Gone"	ES-088
2023	Light Touch Band	"Chi-C-A-G-O (Is My Chicago)"	ES-089
2023	Andy Crown	"Why Do I Love You (Red Greg Radio Edit)"	ES-090
2024	Say She She/Jim Spencer	"Wrap Myself Up In Your Love"	ES-091
2024	Another Taste/Maxx Traxx	"Don't Touch It	ES-092
2024	Leon Bridges and Keite Young/Pastor T. L. Barrett	"Like A Ship"	ES-093
2024	Wilfred Luckie	"My Thing"	ES-094
2024	Stephen Colebrooke	"Shake Your Chic Behind"	ES-095
2024	Hamilton Brothers	"Music Makes The World Go 'Round"	ES-096
2024	Sharon Revoal	"Reaching For Our Star" b/w "Run Between The Raindrops (While My Teardrops Fall)"	ES-097
2025	Ron Harrington with Bob & Ellis	"It Happened To Me Again"	ES-098
2025	Johnson, Hawkins, Tatum & Durr	"You Can't Blame Me"	ES-099
2025	Marion Black	"Go On Fool"	ES-100
2025	Harvey Scales	"All In A Nite's Work" / "Spend The Nite Forever"	ES-101
2025	The Lijadu Sisters	"Danger" / "Cashing In"	ES-102
2025	Spirit of Brotherhood	"Go For It" / "Spirit of Brotherhood"	ES103
2025	Syl Johnson	"Tripping On Your Love" / "Foxy Brown"	ES104
2025	Ujima	"Maybe" / "All I Want Is You"	ES105
2025	Duke D	"Lady Luck" / "Dragon Lady"	ES-106
2026	Jabneel	"Jesus You're Always Here" / "In My Life"	ES107
2026	Karriem	"I Love You"	ES108
2026	General Lee & The Lost Weekend	"Pleasure" / "We Did It Baby"	ES109

===== Eccentric Soul 45s Boxsets =====
Year	Artist	Release	Catalog #
2010	Various Artists	Boddie Acetate Box	ES-BOX001
2011	Lil Ed & The Soundmasters	Lil Ed & The Soundmasters	ES-BOX002
2011	Syl Johnson	Mythological 45s	ES-BOX003

=== From The Stacks ===
Focused on obscurities reissued without changing the release much.

Year	Artist	Release	Catalog #
	Jeff Harrington	Quiet Corner	
	Bert Keely	Take Me Home	
	Sandy Harless	Songs	
	Ethel-Ann Powell	The Elephant Patch	
	Flynn Thomas	Dangerous Friends	
	Trevor Dandy	Don't Cry Little Tree	
	The Eptones	"A Love That's Real" b/w "No One Else But You"	
	Goliath	Hot Rock & Thunder	
	Doug Firebaugh	Performance One	
	Karriem	"I Love You"	
	The Monzas	Hey! I Know You	
	Knightmare II	Death Do Us Part	
	The Jiants	"Tornado" b/w "She's My Woman"	
	Various Artists	Badger A-Go-Go	
	Mouse Bonati Sextet	Mouse's House	
	Vince Howard	Heart-Soul and Inspiration	
	Nicky Roberts	The Sensitive Touch	
	Jack Fascinato	Jack Fascinato's Palm Springs Suite	
	Jack Fascinato	Jack Fascinato Arranges Things	
	Josefus	Get Off My Case	
	Poser	Rock Party	
	Rick Cuevas	"The Birds"	
	Candle Tribe	Nothing but a Feelin'	
2014	Sandstone	Can You Mend a Silver Thread?	
2017	Alex Johnson	Operation Oasis	
2017	The Belles	Melvin	
2017	The Shades	Tell Me Not To Hurt	
2017	The Ralph Williams & John Mixon Duo	Doing What You Wanna Do	
2017	Salty Miller	Album #1	
2017	LaVice & Company	"Thoughts Were The Days" b/w "Yes I Do"	
2017	Chuck Senrick	Dreamin'	
2017	Burnett Sisters	Teen Age Widow	
2017	The Blue Jeans	After Dark	
2017	Devotions	"Same Old Sweet Lovin'" b/w "The Devil's Gotten Into My Baby"	
2017	The Chayns	Live on the Moon	FTS024
2018	The Revelons	'77-'82	
2018	The Germs	Walla Walla Wipeout	
2018	Birdlegs & Pauline	Birdlegs	
2018	The Fenderman	Mule Skinner Blues	
2018	Earl Hooker	The Genius of Earl Hooker	
2018	Jack Adkins	American Sunset	
2018	Mark Jones	Snowblind Traveler	
2018	Pony Sherrell	Jungle Ungle Um Bai	
2018	Pony Sherrell	Pony Sherrell with Phil Moody & His Orchestra	
2018	Swithold	"Slowburner"	
2018	Broken Glass	"Rather You Than Me"	
2018	Jaded Lady	Rock 'N' Roll Ain't Pretty	
2018	Alvie Self	Let's Go Wild	
2018	Don McGinnis	Travelin' Light	
2018	Various Artists	Driftless Dreamers in Cuca Country, Vol. 1	
2018	Wilfred Luckie	"My Thing"	
2018	Gentle	Easy Greasy	
2018	Chasman	Synth-E-Fuge	
2018	Spontaneous Overthrow	All About Money	
2018	Various Artists	Somewhere Down The Line	
2018	Various Artists	Driftless Dreamers in Cuca Country, Vol. 2	
2018	Tony Palkovic	Deep Water	
2018	Tony Palkovic	Every Moment	
2018	Tony Palkovic	Born With a Desire	
2018	Naomi Lewis	Seagulls and Sunflowers	
2018	Naomi Lewis	"Purple Plum" b/w "Danny's Song"	
2018	Naomi Lewis	Cottage Songs	
2019	Jim Spencer	The Most Beautiful Song In The Forest	
2019	Major Arcana	Major Arcana	
2019	Jim Spencer	Landscapes	
2019	Jim Spencer	2nd Look	
2019	Vernal Equinox	New Found World	
2019	New World Music	Intellectual Thinking	
2019	Various Artists	Spare Parts in the Cuca Garage	
2019	Various Artists	Passages from the Cuca Gospel	
2019	The Sensations	Demanding Men	
2019	Frank Youngwerth	"Whirr"	
2019	K.L. Hamilton	"I'm Trying" b/w "RIP (You're In Good Hands)"	
2019	The Fabulous Terrifics	Kiss My Tears Away	
2019	Blue Eyed Soul	You Ain't No Weight	
2019	Cobalt	Astral Travels	
2019	Lee Alfred	"Rockin-Poppin Full Tilting"	
2019	Pluto Pluck	"The Good Thing"	
2019	Suse Millemann	Windows and Light	
2019	Jan Tober & Ron Satterfield	As Long As There's Music	
2019	Andrew Gordon	Silouette	
2019	Michael Hayes	I Vibe	
2019	James Dallas	Life Forms	
2019	Various Artists	Fresh Cuts with Eugene Viscione	
2019	Batang Frisco	Batang Frisco	
2019	Human Race	"Human Race" b/w "Grey Boy"	
2019	Sarod Ragas	Shyamal Sinha	
2019	Stephen Colebrooke	"Shake Your Chic Behind" b/w "Stay Away From Music"	
2019	Pot Valiant	"Volar"	
2019	Pot Valiant	Transaudio	
2019	Pot Valiant	Pot Valiant	
2019	Vagrants	Gone	
2019	The Ruins	4 Song Demo	
2019	John D. Curnow	Northern Wilderness	
2019	Bobby Christian	"Yeah, Yeah"	
2019	Uneda Dennard	"Fantasy Ride"	
2019	Hub Reynolds	Keep on Dreaming	
2019	Dervish	Dervish	
2019	Various Artists	The Best of Don Ray Records	
2019	Morris Chestnut	"Too Darn Soulful" b/w "You Don't Love Me Anymore"	
2019	Eddy Bailes	Dark Side of the Moon	
2020	Skip Mahoaney & The Casuals	Your Funny Moods	
2020	The Summits	It Takes Two	
2020	Promise	Promise	
2020	Phillips	Just Another Day	
2020	Dyson's Faces	Dyson's Faces	
2020	Masumi Hara	To Live in the Sea	
2020	Sally Colahan	"Framed" b/w "I Never Believed"	
2020	The Do's and Don'ts	"No One To Talk My Troubles To"	
2020	Eric Relph	Pretty Darlin'	
2020	Richard Powell	Memories of Glenivy	
2020	John D. Curnow	Wisconsin Song Birds	
2020	Judy Brackin	"Mama's Baby Again" b/w "A Summer Friend"	
2020	Ash Soul, Inc.	"I Do Love You"	
2020	Jody & The Individuals	"Soul Streak" b/w "Hooked"	
2020	Various Artists	Summer 1958: The Morocco Label	
2020	Dianne Mower	"The Secret Sign"	
2020	Jordan De La Sierra	Valentine Eleven	
2020	Crow Johnson	"You Got Me" b/w "Ridin' In The Sky"	
2020	William Cafarelli	Red Kastle Studio	
2020	The Grooms	"I Deserve A Little Bit More" b/w "Slow Down"	
2020	Young Mods	"Gloria" b/w "You Brought The Sunshine"	
2020	Foreign Blue Renaisance	"Finding You" b/w "Oh, Yes I Do"	
2020	The Apostles	"Tomorrow" b/w "I'm A Lucky Guy"	
2020	Tom Dae	Tommy Dae	
2020	Kenny Knight	Crossroads	
2020	Various Artists	Teen Expo: The Quill Label	
2020	The New Colony Six	Breakthrough	
2020	The New Colony Six	Colonization	
2020	The Werps	Shades of Blue	
2020	Charles Brown with Sleepy Creek	I Just Want To Talk To You	
2020	Larry Bright	New Dimensions	
2020	Calvin Keys	Full Court Press	
2020	George Shaw	Encounters	
2020	George Shaw & Century	Flight 2201	
2020	George Shaw & Jetstream	Let Yourself Go!	
2020	Lenny White	Venusian Summer	
2020	Lenny White	Big City	
2020	Angelo Vanotti	Sketches of Anderland	
2020	Frank Potenza	Sand Dance	
2020	Slap & Powell	Drive	
2020	Randall Stephens	The Music I Love Is Gospel	
2021	Mark and Suzann Farmer	We've Been There	
2021	Screaming Gypsy Bandits	In The Eyes	

=== J&D ===
Focused on soul & funk.

Year	Artist	Release	Catalog #
2016	Various Artists	All Night Long (Northern Soul Floor Fillers)	J&D001
2016	Various Artists	Can You Feel That Beat (Funky 45s & Other Rare Grooves)	J&D002
2016	Various Artists	Extra Added Soul (Crossover, Modern and Funky Soul)	J&D003

=== Good God! ===
Focused on gospel music.

Year	Artist	Release	Catalog #
2006	Various Artists	Good God!: A Gospel Funk Hymnal	010
2008	Various Artists	!יאצללה: Soul Messages from Dimona	021
2024	Various Artists	Good God!: Born Again Funk	030
2013	Various Artists	Good God!: Apocryphal Hymns	040

=== Limited Addition ===
The first project under the Numero name, released 7"s.

Year	Artist	Release	Catalog #
2002	Matthew	"Everybody Down" b/w "Stars"	Numero 1
2002	Clinic	"Walking With Thee" b/w "D.T."	Numero 2
2002	Warlocks	Baby Blue	Numero 3
2002	Day Action Band	Free Trip Around The Sun	Numero 4
2003	Antena	To Climb The Cliff/Ingenuous	Numero 5
2003	Sahara Hotnights	No Big Deal/Now Tonight	Numero 6
2003	Brian Jonestown Massacre	Prozac vs. Heroin	Numero 7
2003	The Sea and Cake/Califone	Split EP	Numero 8
2003	Schiller Street Gang*Byrne	Tidal Wave	Numero 9
2003	The Lovetones	Stars	Numero 010
2003	Various Artists	Stock Copy	Numero 1-10

=== Local Customs ===
Soul, focused on a specific scene/location.

Year	Artist	Release	Catalog #
2009	Various Artists	Local Customs: Downriver Revival	026
2010	Various Artists	Local Customs: Lone Star Lowlands	034
2011	Various Artists	Local Customs: Burned at Boddie/Pressed at Boddie/Dubbed at Boddie	035.5
2014	Various Artists	Local Customs: Cavern Sound	054

=== Numbero ===
"Alternate-universe" releases.

Year	Artist	Release	Catalog #
2010	Shoes	Eccentric Breaks & Beats	NBR-001
2011	Parallel Thought	Eccentric Breaks & Beats Volume 2	Numbero#002
2012	Various Artists	WTNG 89.9 FM: Solid Bronze	NBR-002
2023	Various Artists	South Side Story Vol. 23	NBR-003
2015	Various Artists	Lows In The Mix Sixties Volume 54: Kosmic City Part 2	NBR004
2014	Various Artists	Tinmine Soul Supply	NBR-005
2016	Various Artists	Los Alamos Grind!	NBR006
2016	Various Artists	Shanghai'd Soul (Episode 4)	NBR-007
2023	Various Artists	Southwest Side Story Vol. 19	NBR-008
2018	Various Artists	W2NG: 89.9 FM	NBR009
2021	Various Artists	Rust Side Story Vol. 24	NBR-010
2023	Various Artists	Mid-Atlantic Story Vol. 3	NBR-011
2024	Various Artists	Shanghai'd Soul (Epsisode 12)	NBR-012
2024	Various Artists	W3NG	NBR013

=== Numerophon ===
Specializes in vinyl-only releases in limited quantities.

Year	Artist	Release	Catalog #
2009	Niela Miller	Songs of Living	44001
2010	Linda Bruner	Songs for a Friend	44002
2019	Shirley Ann Lee	Songs of Light	44003
2013	Various Artists	Songs of the BOS Label	44004
2014	Sandy Denny & The Strawbs	All Our Own Work	44005
2014	Various Artists	Music from the Mountain Provinces	44006
2015	Various Artists	Saved & Sanctified - Songs of the Jade Label	44007
2015	Elyse Weinberg	Grease Paint Smile	44008
2013	Various Artists	King Bullard Version: Songs of the BOS Label	NPH44004

=== Numero+ ===
Year	Artist	Name	Catalog #
2006	Lord Rhaburn Combo/Jesus Acosta & The Professionals	Disco Connection/Guadjida	NUM+001
2007	Master Jay & Michael Dee	T.S.O.B.	NUM+002
2007	Sabata	Man For My Lady	NUM+003
2007	Fabulous 3 MCs	Rub A Dub Dub	NUM+004
2007	Jay Mitchell	Mustang Sally	NUM+005
2007	Jackie Stoudemire	Invisible Wind	NUM+006
2008	Missy Dee & The Melody Crew	Missy Missy Dee	NUM+007
2008	The Final Solution	Brotherman (Extended)	NUM+008
2011	Doc Rhymin'	Practitioner of Rhymes	NUM+009

=== Private Issues ===
Year	Artist	Release	Catalog #
2011	The Boys	Circuit Overload (The Living Years)	024.5
2013	24 Carat Black	Acetate	025.5

=== Project 12 ===
Exclusive releases for subscribers of Eccentric Soul, Private Mind Garden, and Wayfaring Strangers. Became inactive after 2021.

Year	Artist	Release	Catalog #
2016	Rob Galbraith	Damn It All	1246
2016	Master Wilburn Burchette	Mind Storm	1247.7
2016	Arrogance	Knights of Dreams	1248
2021	94 East	The Cookhouse 5	1250
2016	Jimmy Carter and Dallas County Green	Summer Brings the Sunshine	1251
2016	The Chapells	Are You Ready For...	1252
2016	Tucker Zimmerman	Song Poet	1253
2016	Various Artists	First Annual Inner-City Talent Expo	1254
2016	Circuit Rider	Photograph Attached	1255
2016	Tommy McGee	Positive-Negative	1256
2016	Pisces	Somewhere In Your Mind	1257
2016	Meic Stevens	Outlander	1258
2018	Eula Cooper	Let Our Love Grow Higher	1263
2017	Pastor T. L. Barrett and the Youth for Christ Choir	Do Not Pass Me By Vol. II	1270

=== The Cabinet of Curiosities ===
Focused on homemade/DIY electronic music.

Year	Artist	Release	Catalog #
2018	Various Artists	Escape From Synth City	101
2019	Ansonix	Escape From Synth City: The Game OST	101B
2019	Various Artists	Planisphere	102
2019	Various Artists	You're Not From Around Here	103
2019	Various Artists	Visible Invisible Persons: Distributed In Space	104
2020	Various Artists	Louis Wayne Moody High: 1967	105
2020	Various Artists	Whispers: Lounge Originals	106
2020	Various Artists	NuLeaf: Smooth Jazz Underground	107
2021	Various Artists	Numero 95 ™ : Virtual Experience Software	108
2022	Various Artists	Super Hits of the 70s	109
2023	Various Artists	L80s: So Unusual	110

=== Twinight ===
Year	Artist	Release	Catalog #
2007	George McGregor & The Bronzettes	"Temptation Is Hard To Fight" b/w "Every Time I Wake Up"	TWI 102
2007	Stormy	"The Devastator" b/w "I Won't Stop To Cry"	TWI 104
2007	The Mystiques	"So Good To Have You Home Again" b/w "Put Out The Fire"	TWI 112
2007	Sidney Pinchback & The Schiller Street Gang	"Soul Strokes" b/w "Remind Me"	TWI 114
2007	The Perfections	"Which One Am I" b/w "Why Do You Want To Make Me Sad"	TWI 126
2007	Renaldo Domino	"Not Too Cool To Cry" b/w "Nevermore"	TWI 128
2007	The Kaldirons	"You And Me Baby" b/w "To Love Someone (That Don't Love You)"	TWI 131
2007	Annette Poindexter & Pieces of Peace	"Wayward Dream" b/w "Mama"	TWI 132
2012	Chuck & Mac	"Powerful Love" b/w "The Bear"	TWI 135
2007	Pieces of Peace	"Pass It On Pt. 1" b/w "Pt. 2"	TWI 142
2018	The Mist	"The Girl in the Window" b/w "Life Walked Out"	TWI-146
2007	Nate Evans	"Pardon My Innocent Heart" b/w "Main Squeeze"	TWI 156

=== Wayfaring Strangers ===
Focuses on cataloging privately pressed releases from various genres.

Year	Artist	Release	Catalog #
	Rob Galbraith	Damn It All	
	Arrogance	Knights of Dreams	
	Circuit Rider	Photograph Attached	
	Jimmy Carter & The Dallas County Green	Summer Brings The Sunshine	
	Rob Carr & Bill Kahl	Communication 1	
2006	Various Artists	Wayfaring Strangers: Ladies From The Canyon	008
2006	Susan Pilsbury, Susan Smith	Ladies From The Canyon Bonus EP	008.5
2008	Various Artists	Wayfaring Strangers: Guitar Soli	018
2009	Various Artists	Wayfaring Strangers: Lonesome Heroes	028
2014	Various Artists	Warfaring Strangers: Darkscorch Canticles	048
2016	Various Artists	Wayfaring Strangers: Cosmic American Music	058
2017	Various Artists	Warfaring Strangers: Acid Nightmares	068
2017	Various Artists	Seafaring Strangers: Private Yacht	072
2024	Various Artists	Cosmic American Music: Motel California	158

=== Digital-exclusive releases ===
Numero often releases promotional digital-only singles or digital reissues of releases not issued in a physical manner. Catalog numbers typically end with DIGITAL unless noted otherwise.

Year	Artist	Release	Catalog #
2015	Medusa	"Temptress" b/w "Strangulation"	NUM708lp
2015	Unwound	"Demons Sing Love Songs"	
2016	Various Artists	Eccentric Soul: The 4-J Label	NUM1260DIG1
2016	Various Artists	Viscojon Records	NUM5041DIG1
2016	The Tweeds	I Need That Record: The Tweeds Anthology	NUM5036dig1
2016	The Scientists	"Weird Love"	NUM206.4DIG 1
2016	White Zombie	"God of Thunder"	NUM204.5dig1
2016	White Zombie	Make Them Die Slowly	NUM204.4dig1
2016	White Zombie	Soul-Crusher	NUM204.3dig1
2016	White Zombie	Psycho-Head Blowout	NUM204.2dig1
2016	White Zombie	"Pig Heaven"	NUM204.1.2dig1
2016	White Zombie	Gods on Voodoo Moon	NUM204.1.1dig1
2016	Karriem	"I Love You"	
2016	Echo del Africa National	Récit Historique de a Dioulasso	
2016	Rob Galbraith	"Tell Me With Your Eyes (Just Be You)"	NUM1246dig1
2017	Hüsker Dü	Extra Circus	
2017	Hüsker Dü	"Do You Remember? (Demo)"	
2017	Husker Du	Everything Falls Apart	NUM 1289DIG1
2017	Various Artists	Eccentric Soul: The Saadia Label	NUM1261dig1
2017	The Shades	Tell Me Not To Hurt	NUM5053dig1
2017	Various Artists	Eccentric Soul: The Cash Label	NUM1259dig1
2017	Tommy McGee	"Now That I Have You" b/w "Stay With Me"	
2017	The Monzas	Hey! I Know You	
2017	Husker Du	"Statues" b/w "Amusement"	NUM 704DIG1
2017	Husker Du	In A Free Land	NUM 704.5DIG1
2017	The Cineemas	"Never Gonna Cry" b/w "A Crush on You"	
2018	Naomi Lewis	"Purple Plum" b/w "Danny's Song"	NUM5086
2018	Naomi Lewis	Seagulls and Sunflowers	NUM5085dig1
2018	Naomi Lewis	Cottage Songs	NUM5084dig1
2018	Tony Palkovic	Deep Water	NUM5081dig1
2018	Various Artists	Driftless Dreamers in Cuca Country, Vol. 1	NUM5077dig1
2018	Various Artists	Les Kangas Presents: Somewhere Down the Line	NUM5078dig1
2018	Gentle	Easy Greasy	
2018	Various Artists	Driftless Dreamers in Cuca Country, Vol. 2	NUM5087dig1
2018	Don McGinnis	Travelin' Light	NUM5076dig1
2018	Suse Millemann	"Patterns"	NUM192DIG2
2018	Alvie Self	Let's Go Wild	NUM5074dig1
2018	Jaded Lady	Rock 'n' Roll Ain't Pretty	NUM5075dig1
2018	Various Artists	Cleopatra: In The Garage	NUM5066dig1
2018	Otis Brown	Southside Chicago	
2018	Marissa Nadler	"Where Do I Go"	NUMORP035dig1
2018	Jackie Shane	"Slave For You Baby" b/w "Chickadee"	NUM5426dig1
2018	Happy Rhodes	"Oh the Drears"	NUM199dig1
2018	Nicky Roberts	The Sensitive Touch	NUM5062dig1
2018	Candle Tribe	Nothin' But A Feelin'	NUM5115
2018	Mark Jones	Snowblind Taveler	NUM5060dig1
2018	Irv Teibel	Environments	NUM601APP
2018	Rick Cuevas	"The Birds"	NUM5427dig1
2018	Jack Adkins	American Sunset	
2019	Various Artists	The Best of Don Ray Records	NUM5140
2019	Uneda Dennard	"Fantasy Ride"	NUM5454
2019	Pot Valiant	"Volar"	NUM5457
2019	Pot Valiant	"Pot Valiant"	NUM5456
2019	Vagrants	Gone	NUM5455
2019	Pot Valiant	Transaudio	NUM5137
2019	Shyamal Sinha	Sarod Ragas	NUM5127
2019	Human Race	"Human Race" b/w "Grey Boy"	NUM5445
2019	Lee Alfred	"Rockin-Poppin Full Tilting"	NUM5441
2019	Various Artists	Fresh Cuts with Eugene Viscione	NUM5134digital2
2019	James Dallas	Life Forms	NUM5130
2019	Indian Summer	"Woolworm"	
2019	Michael Hayes	I Vibe	NUM5129
2019	Trey Gruber	Herculean House of Cards	NUM5126
2019	Jan Tober/Ron Satterfield	As Long As There's Music	NUM5118
2019	Suse Millemann	Windows and Light	NUM 5117
2019	Cobalt	Astral Travels	NUM5097
2019	Various Artists	Passages From the Cuca Gospel	NUM5095dig1
2019	Various Artists	Spare Parts in the Cuca Gospel	NUM5094dig1
2019	Various Artists	Eccentric Soul: The Path Label	NUM5096dig1
2019	Duster	"What You're Doing To Me"	
2019	Vernal Equinox	New Found World	NUM5089dig1
2019	The Ruins	4 Song Demo	NUM5453
2019	Athanas Davenport	If It's Not One Thing... It's Another	NUM5451
2019	Gary Davenport & Mark Champion	True Freedom	NUM5448
2019	Pluto Pluck	"The Good Thing"	NUM5437
2019	Blue Eyed Soul	You Ain't No Weight	NUM5116
2019	Joanna Brouk	The Space Between	
2019	Andrew D. Gordon	Silhouette	
2020	Current/Indian Summer	"Orchard" b/w "Key"	NUM5523
2020	Lou Ragland	Is The Conveyor "Understand Each Other"	NUM5224
2020	Current	Starvation and Grief	NUM5221
2020	Various Artists	Spare Parts: The Night Owl Label	
2020	Various Artists	Driftless Dreamers: The Top Gun Label	NUM5205
2020	Syntonic Research, Inc.	Environments 2: Tintinnabulation (Contemplative Sound)	
2020	Larry Phillipson & Larry Lee Trio	Talkin' To Myself	NUM5204
2020	The Cords	"Ghost Power" b/w "Waiting Here for You"	NUM5506
2020	Unwound	7/26/2001	NUM202.2B
2020	Unwound	You Bite My Tongue	NUM5502
2020	Unwound	"Kandykornritualsagainsthatingind"	NUM5501
2020	Unwound	"Caterpillar"	NUM5500
2020	Calm	Moonraker	NUM5499
2020	Calm	7"	NUM5498
2020	Calm	12"	NUM5200
2020	Mohinder	The Mission	NUM5201
2020	Mohider	Nitwits	NUM5497
2020	Various Artists	Heavy Reflections	NUM5196
2020	Various Artists	Reflections	NUM5190
2020	Dave Lewis	Songs of David Lewis	NUM5186
2020	Andwellas Dream	Love and Poetry	NUM5183
2020	Andwella	World's End	NUM5185
2020	Andwella	People's People	NUM5184
2020	Current	Feasting and Mirth	NUM5222
2020	Orange Peel	"I Got No Time" b/w "Searching for a Place to Hide"	NUM5490
2020	Randall Stephens	The Music I Love is Gospel	NUM5182
2020	Various Artists	Gargano's Garage: Lavender, Magenta, Indigo & Blue Fin Labels	
2020	Various Artists	Call Me Old Fashioned	NUM5162
2020	Various Artists	Jungle Juice	NUM5161
2020	Various Artists	Private Beach	NUM5160
2020	Jordan de la Sierra	Valentine Eleven	NUM5136
2020	Various Artists	Summer 1958: The Morocco Label	NUM5155
2020	Andre Gibson & Universal Togetherness Band	Apart: 1980-1984	NUM5158
2020	The T.M.G.'s	"What Can I Do" b/w "The Hatch"	NUM5475
2020	Terri Schmidt	"Closer to Your Heart"	NUM5470
2020	Richard Powell	Memories of Glenivy	NUM5153
2020	Dyson's Faces	Dyson's Faces	NUM5146
2020	Promise	Promise	
2020	The Summits	It Takes Two	NUM5462
2020	Owltian Mia	Owltian Mia	NUMORP209
2020	Current	Coliseum	NUM5220
2020	Mohider	O Nation, You Bleed From Many Wounds, 1896	NUM5201
2020	Teleclere	Affection/Defection	NUM5199
2020	Larry Bright	New Dimensions	
2020	Otis the 3rd	"Time" b/w "Walk on By"	
2021	The Hated	"Words Come Back"	NUM5918
2021	Dream Team	"There He Is" B / W "I'm Not Satisfied"	NUM5599
2021	The Mystic Tide	"Stay Away" b/w "Why"	NUM5605
2021	Dimas Garza	"I Won't Love You Again" b/w "So Funny"	NUM5593
2021	Joyce Street	"Make This A Good Christmas" b/w "What I Really Want for Christmas"	NUM5590
2021	Aaron (Chico) Bailey & The Family Affair Band	"The Point"	NUM5588
2021	Syl Johnson	"Foxy Brown" b/w "Tripping on Your Love"	NUM5580
2021	Robert Slap	Mystic Memories	NUM5252
2021	Iron Knowledge	"Oh-Love" b/w "Show-Stopper"	NUM5553
2021	Karate	"Cherry Coke" b/w "The Schwinn"	NUM5908
2021	Butterfingers	Butterfingers	NUM5238
2021	La Luz & Female Species	"Tale of My Lost Love"	
2021	Bernadette Carroll	Laughing on the Outside	NUM5449
2021	Karate	"Death Kit"	NUM5907
2021	Isabelle Antena	En Cavale	
2021	Spirit of Brotherhood	Spirit of Brotherhood	NUM5226
2021	Joanna Brouk	Healing Music	NUM5226
2021	Helene Smith	"True Love Don't Grow on Trees" b/w "Sure Thing"	NUM5559
2021	Female Species	"Till The Moon Don't Shine" b/w "Sooner or Later"	NUM5550
2021	Charles Brown	Circles	NUM5242
2021	Ashaye	"Dreaming"	
2021	Carol Huges	"Let's Get Together Again" b/w "Don't Turn Your Back"	
2021	Pastor T.L. Barrett and the Youth for Christ Choir	"Lord's Prayer" b/w "Said It Long Time Ago"	
2022	Everyone Asked About You	Everyone Asked About You	NUM5999
2022	C-Clamp	Longer Waves	
2022	Native Nod	New Compositions and Arrangements for the Zither	
2022	90 Day Men	To Everybody	
2022	C-Clamp	"Minnesota"	
2022	Laraaji	Ocean	
2022	Chisel	Live on WPTS, 1997	NUM5998
2022	Chisel	8 A.M. All Day	NUM5955
2022	Everyone Asked About You	"Me vs. You"	
2022	90 Day Men	"A National Car Crash"	
2022	C-Clamp	"Land Meets Sea"	
2022	Ui	"Spilling"	NUM5977
2022	Native Nod	Native Nod	NUM5915
2022	Brighter Side of Darkness	"Disco Ball" b/w "He Made You Mine"	NUM5745
2022	Everyone Asked About You	"Paper Airplanes, Paper Hearts"	NUM5941
2022	90 Day Men	"I've Got Designs On You"	NUM5969
2022	Ui	"The Fortunate One Knows No Anxiety"	
2022	C-Clamp	"In Tow"	NUM5948
2022	The Hated	"Words Come Back (Piano)"	NUM5971
2022	90 Day Men	"Last Night, A DJ Saved My Life"	NUM5945
2022	90 Day Men	1975-1977-1998	
2022	Rex	Rex	NUM5944
2022	Unwound	The Light at the End of the Tunnel Is a Train	
2022	Laraaji	Bethlehem	
2022	Chisel	"What About Blighty?"	
2022	Everybody Asked About You	"It's Days Like This..."	NUM5946
2022	Karate	Concerto Al Barchessone Vesschio 24 02 2002	NUM5911
2022	The Hated	Every Song	NUM5934
2022	Jay Robinson & Penny & The Quarters	"Will I Ever" b/w "You Are Mine"	
2022	Chisel	"Hip Straights"	NUM5938
2022	Ui	"Drive Until He Sleeps"	
2022	Blonde	"Mr. Sightseer"	
2022	Ui	Lifelike	NUM5957
2022	Branko Mataja	Traditional and Folk Songs of Yugoslavia	
2022	Rex	"Seizing a Bufonite"	NUM5937
2022	The Hated	"Someone"	NUM5936
2022	Super Djata Band	Authentique 80	NUM5262
2022	Chisel	Innocents Abroad	NUM5935
2022	Blondie	"I Love You Honey, Give Me A Beer (Go Through It)"	
2022	Sharen Clark & Product of Time	I'm Not Afraid of Love	
2022	Rex	3	NUM5933
2022	Codeine	"Sea"	
2022	The Hated	Like the Days	NUM5931
2022	Betty Wright	The Deep City Recordings	NUM5683
2022	Carletta Sue	"You Keep Holding Back on Love" b/w "Tell Me Everything You Know"	NUM5677
2022	Robert Slap	Ascension to the All That Is	
2022	The Hated	"Underground"	NUM5932
2022	Jimmy "Preacher" Ellis & The Odd Fellows	"Two Tenors, A Tone, and a Bone" b/w "(C'mon) Dance to the Drumbeat"	NUM5672
2022	Rex	"All" b/w "Nayramadin Orgil"	NUM5926
2022	Chisel	"All My Kin"	
2022	The Mystic Tide	"Mystic Eyes" b/w "I Search for a New Love"	NUM5666
2022	Le Ren/Female Species	"Till the Moon Don't Shine"	
2022	Syl Johnson	Ms. Fine Brown Frame	NUM5256
2022	The Hated	What Was Behind	
2022	Joyce Street	"California You're Slippin'"	NUM5659
2022	Laraaji	Celestial Vibration	
2022	The Mystic Tide	"You Won't Look Back" b/w "Mystery Ship"	NUM5657
2022	Peter Barclay	"What Kind of World"	
2022	Super Djata Band	En Super Forme Vol. 1	NUM1276
2022	Alan Dunham	Learning to Fly	
2022	The Hated	Everysong	NUM5624
2022	The Curtis Liggins Indications	What It Is?	
2022	Chisel	"It's Alright, You're O.K." b/w "The Guns of Merdian Hill"	NUM5923
2022	Rex	"Ride Home"	NUM5922
2022	Eiafuawn	Birds in the Ground	
2022	The Hated	The Best Piece of Shit Vol. 3	NUM5920
2022	Peter Barclay	"Second Class Citizen"	
2022	Alan Dunham	"The Guy We Used To Know"	
2022	Shira Small	The Line of Time and the Plane of Now	
2022	The Hated	No More We Cry	NUM5919
2022	The Mystic Tide	"Frustration" b/w "Psychedelic Journey Pt. 1"	NUM5606
2022	General Lee and the Space Army Band	"We Did It Baby"	NUM5609
2022	Marion Black	"Who Knows" b/w "Go on Fool"	NUM5614
2022	The Georgettes	"Would You Rather" b/w "Hard, Hard"	NUM5628
2022	Ida Sands	"Start All Over Again" b/w "Don't Lose a Good Thing"	
2023	Thumbnail	"I Know It Spills"	NUM49261
2023	Gene Russell's Trio	"Jet Set"	NUM4673
2023	Ronn Feaster	"Don't Laugh In My Face and Steal My Man"	NUM4717
2023	LaJohn & Sheela	"Too Far Gone" b/w "Everybody's Problem"	NUM4660
2023	90 Day Men	"What's Next, Explorers?"	NUM4931
2023	Jimmy "Preacher" Ellis	"Everyday's A Holiday With The Blues" b/w "Hard Times"	NUM4578
2023	Jerry Simpson	"Young Boy" b/w "In The Valley of Honey"	NUM4561
2023	The American Analog Set	"You Don't Want Me To Arrive, Do You?"	NUM2296
2023	Boilermaker	"Phil The Water Sweep"	NUM49343
2023	Country Girl Kay	"Mocking Bird Valley"	NUM45053
2023	The Royal Jesters	"Let's Kiss and Make Up" b/w "Love Me"	NUM4679
2023	The Crystals	"Dreams and Wishes" b/w "Mr. Brush"	NUM4677
2023	Elysium	"Christmas"	NUM4650
2023	Mickey & The Soul Generation	"The Whatzit"	NUM4528
2023	The American Analog Set	"Too Tired To Shine I"	NUM2295 ^{a}
2023	Thumbnail	The Sound of	NUM4944
2023	Robin	"Black Windows"	NUM4668
2023	Family Circle	"Stop Turn Around"	NUM46581
2023	Tsunami	"Genius of Crack" b/w "Answerman"	NUM2301
2023	Ui	"Long Egg"	NUM5992
2023	Elysium	"Dulcinea"	NUM46491
2023	Jimmy "Preacher" Ellis	"Put Your Hoe (To My Row)" b/w "Trouble All Over The Land"	NUM4577
2023	90 Day Men	"Untitled 01"	NUM4932
2023	Michael Colson	Portrait of a Higher Dimension	
2023	Boilermaker	"Five Lined Skink"	NUM49342
2023	Country Girl Kay	"Iowa Waltz"	NUM45052
2023	Universal Order of Armageddon	"The Entire Vast Situation" b/w "Painfully Obvious"	NUM4927
2023	Ozean	"Porcelain"	NUM9202
2023	The Hated	"Fly"	NUM4928
2023	Ui	"August Song"	NUM5991
2023	Majesty Crush	"Sunny Pie" b/w "Cicciloina"	NUM2249
2023	The Mike De Leon Band	"Merry Christmas"	NUM4634
2023	Lennie LaCour	"Twinkle Toes (The Christmas Cha Cha)" b/w "No Privacy"	NUM4631
2023	C-Clamp	"2000 Miles"	NUM2191
2023	Chisel	"If You Believe In Christmas Trees"	NUM4929
2023	The American Analog Set	"Where Did You Come From?"	NUM2294
2023	Perk Badger	"I Can't Get Enough" b/w "Come On Back To Me"	NUM4633
2023	90 Day Men	"Two Word Title"	NUM4930
2023	Thumbnail	"Burning Bridges"	NUM49442
2023	Jimmy "Preacher" Ellis	"Can't Work & Watch You" b/w "Work With It"	NUM4576
2023	Ui	"Drive Towards The Smoke"	NUM5990
2023	Kathy Stack	"Housewife's Lament"	NUM40003
2023	The Chieftones	The New Smooth and Different Sound	
2023	Boilermaker	"Backseat Boat"	NUM49341
2023	Elysium	"Glistening Ganache"	NUM4639
2023	Country Girl Kay	"Don't Let The Moon Break Your Heart"	NUM45051
2023	Mickey & The Soul Generation	"Football" b/w "Joint Session"	NUM4467
2023	Alice Swoboda	"I'm Going Down" b/w "I Think It's Time (You Were Mine)"	NUM4531
2023	The Hated	"Miggy's Delight"	NU4933
2023	Majesty Crush	"Sunny Pie"	
2023	Thumbnail	"Parallels"	NUM49441
2023	Ozean	"Fall"	NUM9201
2023	Unwound	"Corpse Pose" b/w "Everything Is Weird"	NUM4935
2023	The American Analog Set	"Queen of Her Own Parade"	NUM2293
2023	Boys Life	"Worn Thin"	NUM2271
2023	Ui	"2-Sided"	NUM5998
2023	Boilermaker	"Drained Nonsense"	NUM4949
2023	Tsunami	"Poodle" b/w "Old City"	NUM4946
2023	Kathy Stack	"Expectation"	NUM40002
2023	Chino Horde	"This Is Done"	NUM4945
2023	Elysium	"Sweetly Said"	NUM4591
2023	Country Girl Kay	"My Heart Says Forget You"	NUM4504
2023	90 Day Men	"She's A Salt Shaker" b/w "Activate The Borders"	NUM4937
2023	Majesty Crush	Love 15	NUM2247
2023	Universal Order of Armageddon	The Switch Is Down	NUM4940
2023	The Hated	"Echoes of Whistle Tree Park"	NUM4940
2023	Pelican/Unwound/Karate	"For Your Entertainment"	NUM4941
2023	C-Clamp	"Soft" b/w "Rinse"	NUM5967
2023	Country Girl Kay	"Life Is Not A Bed Of Roses" b/w "Arkansas Boogie"	NUM4512
2023	Clikatat Ikatowi	Orchestrated and Conducted By	NUM2231
2023	Ui	"Lull"	NUM5987
2023	Thumbnail	"The Sound of Tomorrow Today"	NUM4948
2023	Everyone Asked About You	"A Better Way To A Broken Heart"	
2023	Angel Oak	"If You Can't See The Light"	
2023	Majesty Crush	"Feigned Sleep"	
2023	C-Clamp	"Ocean Pacific"	
2023	The Travelers	"Morning Star" b/w "Groovy"	NUM4493
2023	Thumbnail	Thumbnail	NUM4979
2023	The Hated	"Lighthouse"	
2023	Percy Mays	"I Thank You, Lord"	NUM4555
2023	The American Analog Set	"The Only Living Boy Around" b/w "It's All About Us"	NUM2292
2023	Everyone Asked About You	Sometimes Memory Fails Me Sometimes	NUM2178
2023	Universal Order of Armageddon	"City"	NUM4950
2023	Syl Johnson	"Is It Because I'm Black" b/w "Let Them Hang High"	NUM4517
2023	Kathy Stack	"Summer Wind"	NUM40001
2023	90 Day Men	(It (Is) It) Critical Band	
2023	Ui	"Ay Nako"	NUM5875
2023	Perk Badger	"Burning Up For Your Love" b/w "I Need Your Love To See Me Through"	NUM4541
2023	Vagrants	"Berth"	
2023	The Travelers	"Malibu Sunset" b/w "Hang On"	NUM4487
2023	Majesty Crush	"Horse"	
2023	Boilermaker	"Watercourse"	NUM4973
2023	C-Clamp	"Cah"	
2023	Everyone Asked About You	"Sometimes Memory Fails Me Sometimes"	NUM2177
2023	90 Day Men	"Dialed In"	
2023	Thumbnail	"Flat Broke"	
2023	The Hated	"Tumbling Ground"	
2023	The American Analog Set	"Diana Slowburner II"	NUM2291
2023	Tsunami	"Headringer"	NUM4960
2023	The Travelers	"Windy And Warm" b/w "Last Date"	NUM4485
2023	Percy Mays	"Changes" b/w "Chase Away The Blues"	NUM4415
2023	Majesty Crush	"Cicciolina"	
2023	Pot Valiant	"Cell"	NUM4956
2023	X-Cetra	Stardust	NUM5286
2023	Boilermaker	"Crispin Glover Weekend"	
2023	90 Day Men	"Jupiter and Io"	
2023	Thumbnail	"This Isn't Working"	
2023	The Hated	"Wherever You Go"	
2023	90 Day Men	"Missouri Kids Cuss"	
2023	The Travelers	"Melody of the Moon" b/w "Everywhere I Go"	NUM4482
2023	Boys Life	"Temporary"	
2023	Majesty Crush	"Grow (Davies 7" Version)"	
2023	Ui	Answers	NUM5983
2023	Country Girl Kay	"First and Last Waltz"	NUM5854
2023	Universal Order of Armageddon	Symptom	NUM4962
2023	Margo Guryan	"Spanky and Our Gang"	NUM4539
2023	Everyone Asked About You	Let's Be Enemies	NUM2176
2023	Boilermaker	"Alone"	
2023	Jimmie Green	"Dance"	NUM5894
2023	Margo Guryan	Take A Picture	NUM5283
2023	The Ric-A-Shays	"Turn On" b/w "Groovy"	NUM5895
2023	C-Clamp	"In Glory, In Wire"	
2023	90 Day Men	"Taking Apart The Vessel"	
2023	The Hated	"The Ballad of Dexter Bunk"	
2023	Boys Life	"Breaker Breaker"	
2023	Blonde Redhead	"Vague" b/w "Jet Star"	
2023	Everyone Asked About You	"Across Puddles"	
2023	Bedhead	4-SongEP19:10	NUM4898
2023	Thumbnail	"Straight to Zero"	
2023	Margo Guryan	The Chopsticks Variations	NUM5284
2023	Margo Guryan	"16 Words"	NUM4540
2023	Margo Guryan	"Love (Radio Edit)"	NUM4538
2023	Majesty Crush	No. 1 Fan	
2023	Current/Chino Horde	Current/Chino Horde	NUM4980
2023	Tsunami	Deep End	NUM4969
2023	Tsunami	The Heart's Tremolo	NUM4968
2023	Tsunami	World Tour and Other Destinations	NUM4967
2023	Tsunami	A Brilliant Mistake	NUM4966
2023	Ui	"Back Up"	NUM5982
2023	90 Day Men	"17,000 Kilojoules of Light"	
2023	Chino Horde	Chino Horde	
2023	Boilermaker	"Slingshot"	
2023	C-Clamp	"A Stand Still"	
2023	The American Analog Set	"Magnificent Seventies"	NUM49841
2023	Everyone Asked About You	"Solitaire"	
2023	Boys Life	"Lister" b/w "Without Doubt"	
2023	The Hated	"The Flux Too"	NUM4974
2023	90 Day Men	"Panda Park"	
2023	Skullcrusher/The Hated	"Words Come Back"	
2023	Jimmie Green	"I Need You So" b/w "Let Yourself Go"	NUM5872
2023	The American Analog Set	Through The 90's: Singles and Unreleased	NUM5280
2023	The American Analog Set	The Golden Band	NUM4994
2023	The American Analog Set	From Our Living Room To Yours	NUM4993
2023	The American Analog Set	The Fun of Watching Fireworks	NUM4992
2023	Majesty Crush	"Boyfriend"	
2023	Nacho Méndez	3x2+1	NUM5396
2023	Boys Life	Departures and Landfalls	NUM4996
2023	Boys Life	"Sight Unseen"	
2023	Ui	"The Headache Boat"	NUM5981
2023	C-Clamp	"Morning"	
2023	Jackie Shane	"Walking The Dog"	
2023	90 Day Men	"Even Time Ghost Can't Stop Wagner"	
2023	The Hated	"T.S. Eliot"	NUM4986
2023	Everyone Asked About You	"Last Dance"	
2023	Super Djata Band	Vol. 2	NUM5239
2023	Peter Barclay	I'm Not Your Toy	
2023	Ui	"Answers"	NUM5980
2023	Mickey & The Soul Generation	"We Got To Make A Change" b/w "Give Everybody Some"	NUM5825
2023	Boys Life	Boys Life	NUM4982
2023	90 Day Men	"When Your Luck Runs Out"	
2023	Laraaji	Kalimba	NUM1794
2023	C-Clamp	"Passing"	
2023	Chisel	"The O.T.S. (Early Version)"	
2023	Everyone Asked About You	"Letters Never Sent"	
2023	The Hated	"Two People Blue"	NUM4991
2023	90 Day Men	"Too Late or Too Dead +2"	
2023	Mickey & The Soul Generation	"Iron Leg" b/w "Chocolate"	NUM5824
2023	Boilermaker	Leucadia	NUM5281
2023	C-Clamp	"Shorty" b/w "Saving Daylight"	
2023	Laraaji	Koto	
2023	Everyone Asked About You	"Crazy"	
2023	90 Day Men	Methodist +2	
2023	Ui	"The Sharpie"	NUM5979
2023	The Hated	"The Flux"	NUM4999
2023	Cheryl Glasgow	"Glued to the Spot"	
2023	Junei	"You Must Go On" b/w "Let's Ride"	
2024	Jerry Carter	"Icicle Heart"	
2024	Duster/Dirty Art Club	"Anhedonia II" b/w "Ecstacy Cowgirl"	
2024	Eldritch Anisette	Newark '97	
2024	Suzy Siguenza	Someone Else	
2024	Super Djata Band	Et Le Super Diata Band Du Mali	
2024	Greenflow	Solutions	
2024	Kathy Stack	Kathy Stack	
2024	Cars Get Crushed	"Warped Speed" b/w "Hey Sister Vampire"	
2024	Lorad Group	"Sogni D'ufficio" b/w "L'aldila"	
2024	Richie Marsh & The Hoodwinks	"Half Angel" b/w "Baby, Baby"	
2024	Rye Coalition	"ZZ Topless"	
2024	Tacoma Radar	No One Waved Goodbye	
2024	The Mike De Leon Band	Mike De Leon	
2024	Jahneen	"Changes" b/w "Everybody's Dancin'"	
2024	Zen Fuller	"Doomsday" b/w "Take A Memo From A Fool"	NUM4850
2024	Life Force	"Prove Me Wrong"	NUM4653
2024	Erma Coffee	"Spiders and Snakes" b/w "Shelter of Your Eyes"	
2024	The Lazarus Plot	The Lazarus Plot	
2024	Steve Harvey	"Island In The Sky" b/w "Sax Supreme"	
2024	Carpe Diem	Trust Little to Tomorrow	
2024	Homecoming	"Best Friend"	
2024	Georges Boutz	"Wheels"	
2024	Mad Mods	"Warm and Tender Love" b/w "The Mad Mod"	
2024	Jabneel	"I Believe Lord"	
2024	Peter Davidson	Alphonse	
2024	Karate	"Defendants" b/w "Silence, Sound"	
2024	Boilermaker	Boilermaker	
2024	Bells on Trike	"I Drive"	
2024	Thumbnail	"Ride The Wave"	
2024	Perk Badger	"One Man Woman"	
2024	Salt Creek	"Stories We Can Tell"	
2024	Ui	"Blue Pietro"	
2024	Wilfred Luckie	"My Thing"	
2024	Stephen Colebrooke	"Shake Your Chic Behind" b/w "Stay Away From Music"	
2024	Hamilton Brothers	"Music Makes The World Go Round"	
2024	Jeff Jones	"Daydream"	
2024	The Mar-J's	"Got To Find A Way Out" b/w "Forever (They'll Be A Summer Night)"	
2024	Tristeza	"Are We People" b/w "When Morning Steals The Sky"	
2024	Joseph Brunelle	"Sit Alone Holiday"	
2024	Laughing Kind	"Shotgun" b/w "Sad Memories"	
2024	Patterns Make Sunrises	Patterns Make Sunrises	NUM4902
2024	Monorays with Tony March and his Orchestra	"Five Minutes to Love You" b/w "My Guardian Angel"	NUM4842
2024	Otis Goodwin	"I Feel It Just a Little Bit" b/w "Sometimes"	NUM4473
2024	The Infernos	"Restless Tides" b/w "(A Little More) Tequila"	NUM4841
2024	Boys Life	Boys Life (Demo)	
2024	The Mike De Leon Band	"Ya No Pienses (En Amor)"	NUM4689
2024	Laraaji	Glimpses of Infinity	NUM179G
2024	Dave Lewis	From Time to Time	
2024	Cars Get Crushed	Drag Explosive	
2024	Clikatat Ikatowi	Demo	
2024	Cleo Page	"Goodie Train"	NUM4644
2024	Denyce "Flip" Isaac	"Be For Real"	NUM4730
2024	The Lijadu Sisters	Horizon Unlimited	
2024	Attila & The Huns	"Hurry Back"	NUM4839
2024	The Blenders	"Nothin' But a Party"	NUM4828
2024	Masumi Hara	"Looks Like An Angel" b/w "Abuku"	NUM4834
2024	Wind of Change	"Rain"	
2024	Marion Black	"You're Not Alone" b/w "I'm Gonna Get Loaded"	NUM4832
2024	The Determinations	"O My Love Sweet Love" b/w "Memories Can't Be Broken"	NUM4835
2024	Salvation	"Little Evie"	NUM4831
2024	The Buena Vistas	"Soul Clappin" b/w "Rappin"	NUM4530
2024	Flying Eagles Gospel Singers	"The Lord's Been So Good"	NUM4760
2024	Allure	Bankers Hill	
2024	Robb London	"Bitter Tears" b/w "Standing Under Big Ben"	NUM4773
2024	Tsunami	"Breakdown"	
2024	Junior & The Classics	"Wise Up" b/w "Stock Blues in D"	NUM4825
2024	Blue Heaven & The Cadillac Queens	"Closet of My Dreams" b/w "I Ain't Gonna Eat That Thing"	NUM4830
2024	Carpe Diem	"Carpe Diem"	
2024	Robert Slap	Astral Massage	
2024	Blonde Redhead	"10 Feet High" b/w "Valentine"	
2024	Boilermaker	"Bluebird"	
2024	Danny Segovia & The Sessions	"My Angel Diane" b/w "Hey Babe"	NUM4738
2024	Just Us	"Love is All We Need"	
2024	Codeine	"Kitchen" b/w "House"	
2024	Joseph Brunelle	"See My Light"	
2024	Suzy Siguenza	"See You Again"	
2024	The Kings	"It's The LCB" b/w "If I Could Believe You"	
2024	Joan Brooks	"The Fool on the Hill"	NUM40121
2024	D.R. Hooker	Armageddeon	NUM5303
2024	Walter Bee	"Angel Mn" b/w "Give Me A Chance"	NUM4824
2024	Frail	Frail	NUM4913
2024	Kathy Stack	"There's No Hurry"	NUM40005
2024	Clikatat Ikatowi	"Identity Crisis (Demo)"	NUM9235
2024	Arlene Bell	"Did You Mean It" b/w "My Lover"	NUM4808
2024	Crystal Waters Band	"Midnight Dreamer"	
2024	Cars Get Crushed	"Kings Corner Flush"	NUM4921
2024	The Pennikurvers	"Halo"	
2024	Spunk	"Tighten It Up"	NUM5304
2024	Cindy & The Playmates	"A Portrait of God's Love" b/w "Don't Stop This Train"	NUM4806
2024	Eldritch Anisette	"Secondhanded"	NUM4907
2024	Georges Boutz	Amber 7	NUM4641
2024	Country G-J's	"Before The War" b/w "Go Girl Go"	NUM4816
2024	Mike & the Belairs	"She's Mine" b/w "Buscando (Searchin')"	NUM4684
2024	Everyone Asked About You	"We're All Losing It"	
2024	Thumbnail	"Superhero's Trick"	NUM49092
2024	The Family Circle	Love Bound	
2024	Flying Eagles Gospel Singers	"Another Day's Journey"	NUM4760
2024	Syl Johnson	"Dream of a Lifetime" b/w "All The Way Up To The Top"	NUM4809
2024	Tsunami	"Jonathan (She Cracked)"	NUM2306
2024	Jim Spencer	"We're All In This Together"	NUM4612
2024	Carpe Diem	"It Gets Black"	NUM4905
2024	D.R. Hooker	"Armageddon"	NUM53033
2024	Boilermaker	"From Phoenix at Four"	NUM49123
2024	Manny Lopez	"Quiéreme Siempre" b/w "Hawaiian Eye"	NUM4813
2024	Frail	"Revolution"	NUM49133
2024	Ose	"Computer Funk"	NUM4798
2024	Sonia Ross	"Breaking My Heart"	NUM4801
2024	Clikatat Ikatowi	"Transmission"	NUM9234
2024	The Stoned Circus	The Stoned Circus	NUM4011
2024	Kathy Stack	"Goin' Home"	NUM40004
2024	Country Girl Kay	"Love Can't Stay Away"	NUM45072
2024	Country Girl Kay	"I Still Worry Over You"	NUM45071
2024	Joseph Brunelle	"Eazy" b/w "The Barry's"	NUM46172
2024	The Thunderbolts	"Thunder Head" b/w "Blending"	NUM4811
2024	Z-Factor	"Fantasy"	NUM4807
2024	Tsunami	"Be Like That" b/w "Newspaper"	NUM2305
2024	Henry Pena & The Kasuals & Cobra	"Slowly But Surely" b/w "Workout"	NUM4695
2024	The Oppels & Linco	"You Know I Love You" b/w "Day and Time"	NUM4455
2024	Fantastic Mainstream & Goodie Train	"Play That Funky Style Black Man" b/w "Let's Be Friends"	NUM4794
2024	Boys Life	"Boxes"	NUM2273
2024	Dave Lewis	"Yesterday's Gone"	NUM40083
2024	Marion Black	"More Love Is All We Need"	NUM4793
2024	Cars Get Crushed	"Drag Explosive"	NUM49214
2024	James Monroe & Magic Touch	"Frontiers of the Galaxy" b/w "Funky Lady"	NUM4800
2024	George Boutz	"Night Flight"	NUM46412
2024	Life Force & Strawberry	"Slow Dancer"	NUM465311
2024	Alice Swoboda	"The Dove of Peace" b/w "Potters Field"	NUM4652
2024	Universal Order of Armageddon	"Fence Song"	NUM2215
2024	Thumbnail	"Lesson in Mind Control"	NUM49091
2024	Joyce Street	"Stupid Is My Middle Name"	NUM4791
2024	The Mike De Leon Band	"Eye Talk"	NUM46981
2024	G. Robert G.	"Private Number" b/w "But That Was Then"	NUM4814
2024	Margo Guryan	Spanky and Our Gang	NUM0855
2024	The Mike De Leon Band	"Muneca"	NUM46982
2024	Ui	"Mrs. Lady Lady"	NUM5994
2024	Bob Bakert	Bob Bakert	NUM4010
2024	Boilermaker	"Here Comes Rolling"	NUM49122
2024	D.R. Hooker	"This Moment"	NUM53032
2024	Clikatat Ikatowi	"Saxby's Gail"	NUM9233
2024	The Mike De Leon Band	Elegante!	NUM46815
2024	The LMNOPs & Chanson	"I Need You" b/w "Calling"	NUM4461
2024	Tsunami	Diner	NUM2304
2024	Eldritch Anisette	"Japan"	NUM4908
2024	Family Circle	"La La So Lucky"	NUM46585
2024	Frail	"Paradise Lost"	NUM49132
2024	Country Girl Tay	Old Montana Trail	NUM4506
2024	Classie Ballou	"Classie's Whip" b/w "Soul Philly"	NUM4786
2024	Richard Bowen	"Sorcery"	NUM4785
2024	Carpe Diem	"Low Threshold"	NUM4911
2024	The Stoned Circus	"Gotta Find A Way" b/w "Try Love"	NUM4715
2024	Jeff Jones	"Metro Love"	
2024	Peter Davidson	"Iris Spectre Rock 5"	NUM4610
2024	Robb London	"Crazy Baby" b/w "Mary Jane"	NUM4772
2024	Classie Ballou	"Classie's Whip" b/w "Soul Philly"	NUM4786
2024	Cathy Smith & Linco	"Baby You Got It"	NUM4787
2024	B.B. Carter & Consolidated Productions	"Sweet Words" b/w "Leave Me Alone"	NUM4781
2024	Jabneel	"In My Life"	NUM40091
2024	Sam Frazier Jr.	"I Don't Want Another Love (Like The One I Had)" b/w "I Got To Tell Somebody"	NUM4782
2024	Unwound	"MK Ultra" b/w "Totality"	NUM4910
2024	Dave Lewis	"Going To The Better Side of Time"	NUM40082
2024	The Dontels	"Moaning and Crying" b/w "Soul Nitty Gritty"	NUM4812
2024	Bob Mattice and The Phaetons	"Camel Walk" b/w "Safari"	NUM4783
2024	Jimmy "Preacher" Ellis	"Go Head On" b/w "I'm Gonna Do It By Myself"	NUM4771
2024	Life Force	"Funky Mama"	NUM4653
2024	Cars Get Crushed	"Weather Conditions"	NUM49213
2024	Thumbnail	"Chagrin" b/w "Padlock"	NUM4942
2024	Clikatat Ikatowi	"Librarian"	NUM9231
2024	Kenny and the Ho-Daddies	"Surf Dance" b/w "Goofy Guitar"	NUM4780
2024	Doug Sahm	"Just A Moment" b/w "Sapphire"	NUM4692
2024	Boilermaker	"Midnight Manager"	NUM49121
2024	Universal Order of Armageddon	Live on WFMU	NUM2214
2024	Margo Guryan	Moon Ride	NUM0854
2024	Majik	"You Gotta Get Up"	NUM4687
2024	The New Roadrunners	"Tired of Living" b/w "Love Is"	NUM4562
2024	Jahneen	"Gigolette"	NUM4766
2024	D.R. Hooker	"Hello"	NUM53031
2024	The Mike De Leon Band	"Granada"	NUM46814
2024	Georges Boutz	"Climb"	NUM46411
2024	Family Circle	"Together We Can Make It"	NUM46584
2024	Peter Davison	"Iris Spectre Rock 2"	NUM4609
2024	Majesty Crush	"Space Between Your Moles"	NUM22413
2024	Clikatat Ikatowi	"Off to Here"	NUM9232
2024	Country Girl Kay	"Utah Two Step"	NUM45063
2024	Frail	"Blister"	NUM49131
2024	Rob Galbraith	"Damn It All (Alt Version)"	NUM4762
2024	Joseph Brunelle	"Round to It"	NUM46171
2024	Marion Black	"I'm Gonna Get Loaded"	NUM4758
2024	The Electric Express	"Where You Coming From"	NUM4423
2024	Harmonica George	"You Make Me Tick" b/w "Freelance"	NUM4761
2024	Jimmy Ellis	"Outskirt of Town"	NUM4751
2024	Bob Belche	"Fall on Me Rain" b/w "The Game Goes On"	NUM4705
2024	Boys Life	"Cloudy+47"	NUM2272
2024	Cars Get Crushed	"The Thunderbolt"	NUM49212
2024	Eldritch Anisette	Eldritch Anisette	NUM4920
2024	Royal Five	"My Baby Cares for Me" b/w "Someone Who Cares"	NUM4689
2024	Ui	"Match My Foot"	NUM5984
2024	Brighter Side of Darkness	"Because I Love You" b/w "Oh Baby"	NUM4753
2024	David Lewis	"Good Morning"	NUM40081
2024	Universal Order of Armageddon	Longer, Stranger	NUM2213
2024	Thumbnail	Red! Dead!	NUM4926
2024	Gene Russell's Trio	"Feelin' Good"	NUM4754
2024	Boilermaker	Boilermaker (7")	NUM4957
2024	Trevor Dandy	Don't Cry Little Tree	NUM5037DIG2
2024	The Laughing Kind	"I Who Have Nothing" b/w "Show Me"	NUM4688
2024	The Mike De Leon Band	"O-My-Luv"	NUM46813
2024	Craig Dove	Craig Dove	NUM4006
2024	Margo Guryan	"Half-Way In Love"	NUM0853
2024	Peter Davison	"Control"	NUM4608
2024	Vernon Green and the Medallions	"Deep, So Deep" b/w "Shimmy Shimmy Shake"	NUM4622
2024	Carpe Diem	"No Merge"	NUM4922
2024	Country Girl Kay	"Canadian Waltz (Alternative Version)"	NUM45064
2024	Tsunami	Matchbook	NUM2303
2024	Mickey & The Soul Generation	"U.F.O." b/w "Hey Brother Man"	NUM4529
2024	Bob Bakert	"Angel Lady"	NUM4729
2024	Lazy Day	"Got To Get Away"	NUM4727
2024	Elysium	Glisten	NUM4649
2024	Cars Get Crushed	"A Slight Sting"	NUM49211
2024	Majesty Crush	Fan	NUM22412
2024	Family Circle	"(I Like) The Simple Things"	NUM46583
2024	The Secrets	"It's Your Heart Tonight" b/w "Get Your Radio"	NUM5892
2024	Sonny Ace and the Twisters	"Stand By Love" b/w "Anymore"	NUM4685
2024	The Wry Catchers	"Collision Course" b/w "When I Met You"	NUM4556
2024	Margo Guryan	"Kiss and Tell"	NUM0852
2024	Eldritch Anisette	"Dissection of Silence"	NUM4923
2024	Lennie LaCour	"Rock N Roll Romance" b/w "Jungle Rock"	NUM4726
2024	Boilermaker	In Wallace's Shadow	NUM4934
2024	Jimmy "Preacher" Ellis	"Why I Sing The Blues"	NUM4725
2024	The American Analog Set	"Mellow Fellow"	NUM2298
2024	Craig Dove	"Complete" b/w "Ocean of Love"	NUM40061
2024	Thumbnail	"Insect Sex Trap"	NUM49263
2024	Perk Badger	"Baby Don't Be No Fool"	NUM4724
2024	Universal Order of Armageddon	"Desperate Motion"	NUM2212
2024	Spunk	"La Bimini"	NUM4665
2024	Little Joe Blue	"Don't Tax Me In" b/w "Lonely"	NUM4575
2024	Steve Parks/Steve Marshall	"Still Thinking of You"	NUM5708
2024	The Travelers	"Traveler" b/w "Seven Minutes Till Four"	NUM4722
2024	Country Girl Kay	"Old Montana Trail"	NUM45061
2024	The Mystic Tide	"Running Through The Night"	NUM4721
2024	Syl Johnson	"Different Strokes" b/w "Sorry Bout Dat"	NUM4700
2024	The Mike De Leon Band	"Hey C'mon"	NUM46812
2024	Elysium	"Proud Man"	NUM46492
2024	Majesty Crush	"No. 1 Fan (EP Version)"	NUM22411
2024	Boys Life	"Strike 3"	NUM4963
2024	Stoned Circus	"Corina"	NUM4667
2024	Bob Bakert	"Cactus Woman"	NUM4714
2024	Robin	"Yesterday's Sun"	NUM4713
2024	The Stoned Cirus	"Corina"	NUM4667
2024	The 20th Century	"Hot Pants	NUM4545
2024	Harvey Scales and the Seven Sounds	"Don't You Ever Let It End" b/w "The Sound of Soul"	NUM4419
2024	90 Day Men	"Kool Aid Kid"	NUM4924
2024	Roy Roberts	"Stop (Watch What You Doing to Me)"	NUM4418
2024	Gene Russell	"Foggy Bottom" b/w "Doin' The Snake Hips"	NUM4701
2024	Lord August and the Visions of Life	"Mod Fashions" b/w "Everybody's Always Putting Me Down"	NUM4558
2024	Universal Order of Armageddon	"Four Measure Start"	NUM2211
2024	Marsha Wilson	"Whole Lotta Woman (Good Loving Man)" b/w "O.D. Blues"	NUM4711
2024	Tsunami	"Souvenir Folder of Beautiful Arlington, VA"	NUM2302
2024	Jimmy "Preacher" Ellis	"Party Time"	NUM4710
2024	Boilermaker	"Shepherd"	NUM49344
2024	Thumbnail	"Bullshit Detector"	NUM49262
2024	Margo Guryan	"More Understanding Than A Man"	NUM0851
2024	Iron Knowledge	"Give Me a Little Taste (Of Your Love)"	NUM4719
2024	The American Analog Set	"What Are We Going To Tell Guy?"	NUM2287
2024	Ui	Sidelong	NUM5993
2024	Tommy Dae & The High Tensions	"Tampico Rage" b/w "Lost Horizon"	NUM4498
2024	Perk Badger	"I Got A Thing For You Baby"	NUM4708
2024	Majesty Crush	"Worri"	NUM22410
2024	Country Girl Kay	"Blue Montana Skies"	NUM4505
2024	The Mystic Tide	"I Wouldn't Care"	NUM4707
2024	Family Circle	"Barbara Lee"	NUM46582
2024	Eldritch Anisette	"Pessimism Goes To Work"	NUM4925
2024	The Mike De Leon Band	"I Am Still In Love"	NUM4681
2025	The Exceptions	"Candy" b/w "Nitty Gritty"	
2025	The Von Trapps	"Go With Me"	
2025	The Lijadu Sisters	"Fasiribo (Apala)"	
2025	The Glovaires	"You Must Be Born Again" b/w "Stand by Me"	
2025	The Inspirations	"Ring Those Bells" b/w "The Cumberland and the Marrimac"	
2025	Ida	"AZ U R"	
2025	The Lazarus Plot	The End	NUM6054
2025	Cars Get Crushed	cars get crushed	
2025	Karate	"Dating Is Stupid"	
2025	Ida	"Past the Past"	
2025	Robin Richman	"Like a Little Boy"	
2025	Today, Tomorrow, Forever	"Surprise! Surprise!"	
2025	Ethel Meserve	"Onward Foster" / "Tamsen" / "Belated Blues"	
2025	Should	Feed Like Fishes	
2025	Leonard (Lil' Man) Kaigler	"I Think It's A Big One Coming" b/w "You Got Me Believing In You (Dreamin' 'Bout You)"	
2025	Ujima	"All I Want Is You"	
2025	The Von Trapps	"Rollercoaster"	
2025	Tirez Tirez	"Dreams"	
2025	MACHA	MACHA	
2025	Karate	"Hard Song"	
2025	The American Analog Set	"The Postman"	
2025	Burden Lifters	"Bless The People Everyday"	
2025	Jejune	"Early Stars"	
2025	Geek	"Shoelaces"	NUM60633
2025	Should	"Ocean Warm"	NUM9322
2025	Hüsker Dü	Sept. 17 & 19th, Europe	
2025	Macha	"The Nipplegong"	
2025	Jejune	This Afternoons Malady	NUM6351
2025	Should	"Feed Like Fishes"	
2025	Geek	"Guy (Anchor)"	
2025	Endive	"Stars"	
2025	Rye Coalition	"White Jesus of 114 St." b/w "Romancing The Italian Horn"	
2025	The Exploration	Summer Demo	
2025	Jejune	"Coping With Senility (Lowlife Owns A Pen)"	
2025	Lodestar	Lodestar	
2025	Macha	Macha	
2025	Karate	"Hard Song"	
2025	Majesty Crush	"Party Girl (Live in 1991 Opening for Chapterhouse)	
2025	Husker Du	Nov. 3, Salt Lake City	
2025	Geek	"Herasure"	

=== One-off sublabels ===
Often just used for one or two releases, usually parodying an already existing label's name and logo.

Year	Artist	Release	Sublabel	Catalog #
2022	Various Artists	Valley of the Sun: Field Guide to Inner Harmony	Valley of the Sun	195
2017	Joseph Washington, Jr./The Tweeds	"Shopping" b/w "I Need That Record"	Numero-Tone	799
2022	Ponderosa Twins + One	2+2+1 = Ponderosa Twins + One	Numeroscope Records	1264
2022	Lou Ragland	Understand Each Other	Num Records	1285
2013	Express Rising	Express Rising		ER-3014
2015	Express Rising	Fixed Rope		ER5015
2018	Express Rising	Fixed Rope II		ER-8016
2022	Rupa	"Disco Jazz"	The Numero Company	ES078
2023	Poderosa Twins Plus One	"Bound"	Numeroscope Records	ES085
2025	Various Artists	The Chicago Boogie Volume 4: Comin' At Ya		NUM-SC1269
2023	Ned Doheny	The Darkness Beyond The Fire		ORP016
	Link Crowell	"Crazy Like A Fox" b/w "Shock Me"	Ork Records	ORK81981
	Stone Coal White	S/T		CT-010

== Notes ==
a The page is no longer available, but the catalog number can be seen here.
