= Willie Wright (musician) =

American singer (1939–2020)

Background information
- Born: William C. Gathright; July 7, 1939; Belen, Quitman County, Mississippi, U.S.
- Died: June 29, 2020 (aged 80) Providence, Rhode Island, U.S.
- Genres: Soul
- Occupations: Singer, songwriter
- Instruments: Guitar, flute, keyboards
- Website: williewrightmusic.com

William C. Gathright (July 7, 1939 – June 29, 2020), known professionally as Willie Wright, was an American soul singer and songwriter, best known for his "rediscovered" 1977 album, Telling the Truth.

== Early life ==
Wright was born William Gathright on July 7, 1939 in Belen, Quitman County, Mississippi. His family moved frequently during his childhood, living in Osceola, Arkansas, before settling in St. Louis, Missouri. In 1951, the family relocated to Manhattan's Upper East Side.

In his teens he sang with friends George Bragg and Harry Jensen in a Harlem doo-wop group, The Persuaders. The three later formed the Willie Wright Trio. Wright then began performing as a solo singer and songwriter in clubs in Greenwich Village, and also played flute with The Three Degrees. He turned down offers to sign with a major label, and according to his current record label "deliberately chose artistic freedom over the sharecropper's existence to which many of the best artists of his generation were subjected."

== Career ==
During the early 1960s Wright formed Willie Wright and Combo with guitarist Harry Jensen and drummer George "Buzzy" Bragg, performing R&B, soul, rock, folk, and jazz in clubs throughout New York City. After Bragg departed the group, Wright continued performing with Jensen before establishing himself as a solo performer, appearing regularly at clubs including Brandy's and The Cellar in Manhattan.

In 1967 Wright relocated to the Boston area after accepting a regular engagement at Brandy's Boston. Alongside his musical career, he briefly operated a record shop and later co-owned an Allston counterculture store called The Cellar, which became a gathering place for local musicians and artists.

Wright continued to sing in clubs, setting up his own label, Hotel Records, in 1970, and releasing a single. In 1971, he released his first album, Lack of Education (aka Too Soon to Know), which mostly contained cover versions of other musicians' songs, including Curtis Mayfield's "Right On For The Darkness". The album included both studio recordings and live performances recorded at the Boston Tea Party. Although it received little commercial attention at the time of its release, the album later became sought after by record collectors.

In 1976 he began performing for tourists and vacationers at Nantucket. He decided to move there, and started to write more songs. In 1977, he recorded his second album, Telling the Truth, during a single day's session at Variety Recording Studio in New York City with Harry Jensen and George Bragg. The album was recorded at low cost in exchange for the singer recording some commercials, but was described by AllMusic as "a deeply personal set that delved into Wright's attitudes about his life, his relationships with women, and the children he'd fathered but left behind", and featured "spare, intimate arrangements...[and] austere production... dictated by the fact it was recorded in a single day." The album was privately pressed in an edition of approximately 1,000 copies and sold primarily at Wright's performances and from the trunk of his car.

After leaving Nantucket around 1980, Wright moved to Providence, Rhode Island, where he continued to perform. He retired from live performance in 2002, after recording and releasing a live album, Brother Bill. He continued writing songs and occasionally performed under the name Brother Bill, but largely withdrew from the commercial music industry. In 2008, he was diagnosed with Parkinson's disease.

"Right On For The Darkness" was included on several compilation albums of rare soul music, and was recognized as a highly collectible record, but Wright remained a relatively obscure figure until 2011, when Telling the Truth was reissued on CD by the Numero Group. The interest that this generated, including comparisons with Bill Withers, led Wright to record a new album, This Is Not A Dream, in Burlington, Vermont. The album was issued by Green Coil Records in 2012.

Wright died on June 29, 2020, in Providence, Rhode Island, at the age of 80.
