= Pisces (band) =

American band

- Also known as: A Lovely Sight
- Origin: Rockford, Illinois, United States
- Genre: Psychedelic rock
- Years active: 1967–1970
- Labels: Vincent; The Numero Group
- Past members: Paul Diventi; Jim Krein; Dale Taylor; Carl Van Laningham; Red Balderama; Linda Bruner

Pisces was an American psychedelic rock band formed in Rockford, Illinois, in 1967. During the band's existence, they recorded two singles and an album's worth of unreleased material before disbanding in 1970. In 2009, the Numero Group released the album A Lovely Sight, which compiles Pisces' songs from the original studio sessions. Highlighted by the singing of vocalist Linda Bruner, the record label distributed a follow-up EP focused exclusively on her previously unreleased studio work.

== History ==
A loose affiliation of musicians, Pisces' core members were Paul DiVenti (keyboards, vocals) and Jim Krein (lead guitar), who both originally partnered together to record a promo single in 1967. Krein visited San Francisco in the same year, becoming immersed in the city's psychedelic music scene, and returned to form the band Pisces with DiVenti, as well as Dale Taylor (rhythm guitar, vocals), Carl Van Laningham (drums), and Red Balderama (banjo, bass guitar). More of a recording project than a live act, Diverti and Klein constructed a studio in the back of Nielsen's Music Store to experiment with their self-penned material.

In the studio, the duo constantly used backwards guitar techniques, phased drums, distorted vocals, and unusual sound effects heavily inspired by the Beatles' Sgt. Pepper's Lonely Hearts Club Band and their 1968 self-titled album. Pisces was signed by Vincent Chiarelli, a tailor in Rockford, to his newly established Vincent Records, and released the two singles "Motley Mary Ann" and "A Homesick Feelin'" in 1968. Later recording by the group were accompanied by 17-year-old vocalist Linda Bruner who had initially gone to Krein for guitar lessons. Bruner sang lead on the four tracks "Dear One", "Say Goodbye to John", "Sam", and "Are You Changing in Your Time". The group released their third and final single, "Sam", in 1969 under the name Bruner. In the following year, Bruner, with acoustic accompaniment provided by Klein, recorded six songs, five of which were cover versions, on a borrowed half-track, but after their studio was destroyed by fire Pisces disbanded.

Not much else is known about Bruner, who was disillusioned with the music industry, although most reports state she was on the run following a check fraud scheme. Even though much of their equipment was damaged by the fire, DiVenti preserved the band's master tapes in a storage locker. On June 2, 2009, the Numero Group released the material on the eponymous studio album A Lovely Sight. It was generally met with positive reception, with music critics often highlighting Bruner's melancholy vocal delivery. In his evaluation of the album, critic Douglas Wolk applauded Pisces for "mightily impressive studio technique for a couple of guys who were basically doing everything on their own. Every song here has a distinctive and freaky sonic identity that makes a lot out of their limited resources". Rob Hatch-Miller of Dusted magazine wrote there was "something truly special in the musical chemistry" of the band. He also stated "The Bruner tracks are without a doubt the deepest and most memorable moments" on A Lovely Sight.

In 2010, the Numero Group released the EP Songs for a Friend, which features Bruner's collaborative work with Klein. Drastically stripped-down in comparison to the psychedelic arrangements on A Lovely Sight, the EP focuses on Bruner's somber covers of popular songs and her one original composition, "Songs Linda Wrote Herself". Numero Group distributed more of Pisces recordings between 1967 and 1969 as Somewhere in Your Mind, in 2016.

== Discography ==
=== EPs ===
- Songs for a Friend (2016)

=== Singles ===
- "Motley Mary Ann" (1968, Vincent)
- "A Homesick Feelin'" (1968, Vincent)
- "Good Morning Sunshine" (1969, Epic)
- "Sam" (1969, Vincent)

=== Compilations ===
- A Lovely Sight (2009)
- Somewhere In Your Mind (2016)
