= Warfaring Strangers: Darkscorch Canticles =

2014 compilation album by various artists

Compilation album by Various artists
- Released: February 18, 2014
- Genre: Proto-metal, heavy psych
- Length: 62:24
- Label: The Numero Group
- Producer: Dustin Drase, Rob Sevier, Ken Shipley

Warfaring Strangers: Darkscorch Canticles is a 2014 compilation album distributed by The Numero Group.

== Style ==
Pitchfork described the sound of the compilation as "mid-1970s American proto-metal" with groups who drew influence from bands such as Deep Purple, Uriah Heep and Black Sabbath. The bands represented on the album were predominantly from middle America while the rest were from the southern United States. The only exception being Triton Warrior from Toronto and Hellstorm who were the only African-American group. The groups all draw influence lyrically from the works of J.R.R. Tolkien delving into themes of sorcery, dragons, and necromancy.

== Release ==
Warfaring Strangers: Darkscorch Canticles was released by The Numero Group on February 18, 2014. The album was released on both vinyl and compact disc. The label also released a version of the album which included board game themed around the record.

== Reception ==
Professional ratings
Review scores
Source	Rating
AllMusic	4/5 stars
Pitchfork	(7.6/10)

Pitchfork praised the album, opining that what groups on the album "so compelling, though, are their idiosyncratic visions of weird America." Stephen Thomas Erlewine (AllMusic) noted that the groups on the album suffer from solipsism, but it was part of the charm on the album as well as commenting that "If the music isn't great – this was garage rock where there was no emphasis on hooks or melody, so it's only immediate in its attack, not its form – it's always forceful, which is a large part of its appeal. These are bands where the point was the playing, not the song, and what's interesting is how these 16 acts adhere to a sound but never echo each other." Ned Raggett (The Quietus) noted that the album contains "no true lost classic to be had, though there are some definite moments", noting that "The diamonds in the rough that emerge always have just something extra"

AllMusic listed the album as being among their favourite reissues and compilation albums of 2014.

== Track listing ==
1. Air – "Twelve O'Clock Satanial"
2. Wrath – "Warlord"
3. Stonehenge – "King of the Golden Hall"
4. Triton Warrior – "Sealed in a Grave"
5. Junction – "Sorcerer"
6. Stone Axe – "Slave of Fear"
7. Wizard – "Seance"
8. Stoned Mace – "Tasmania"
9. Arrogance – "Black Death"
10. Sonaura – "Song of Sauron"
11. Dark Star – "Spectre"
12. Inside – "Wizzard King"
13. Space Rock – "Dark Days"
14. Medusa – "Black Wizard"
15. Gorgon Medusa – "Sweet Child"
16. Hellstorm – "Cry For The Newborn"
