= Alfonso Noel Lovo =

Nicaraguan composer

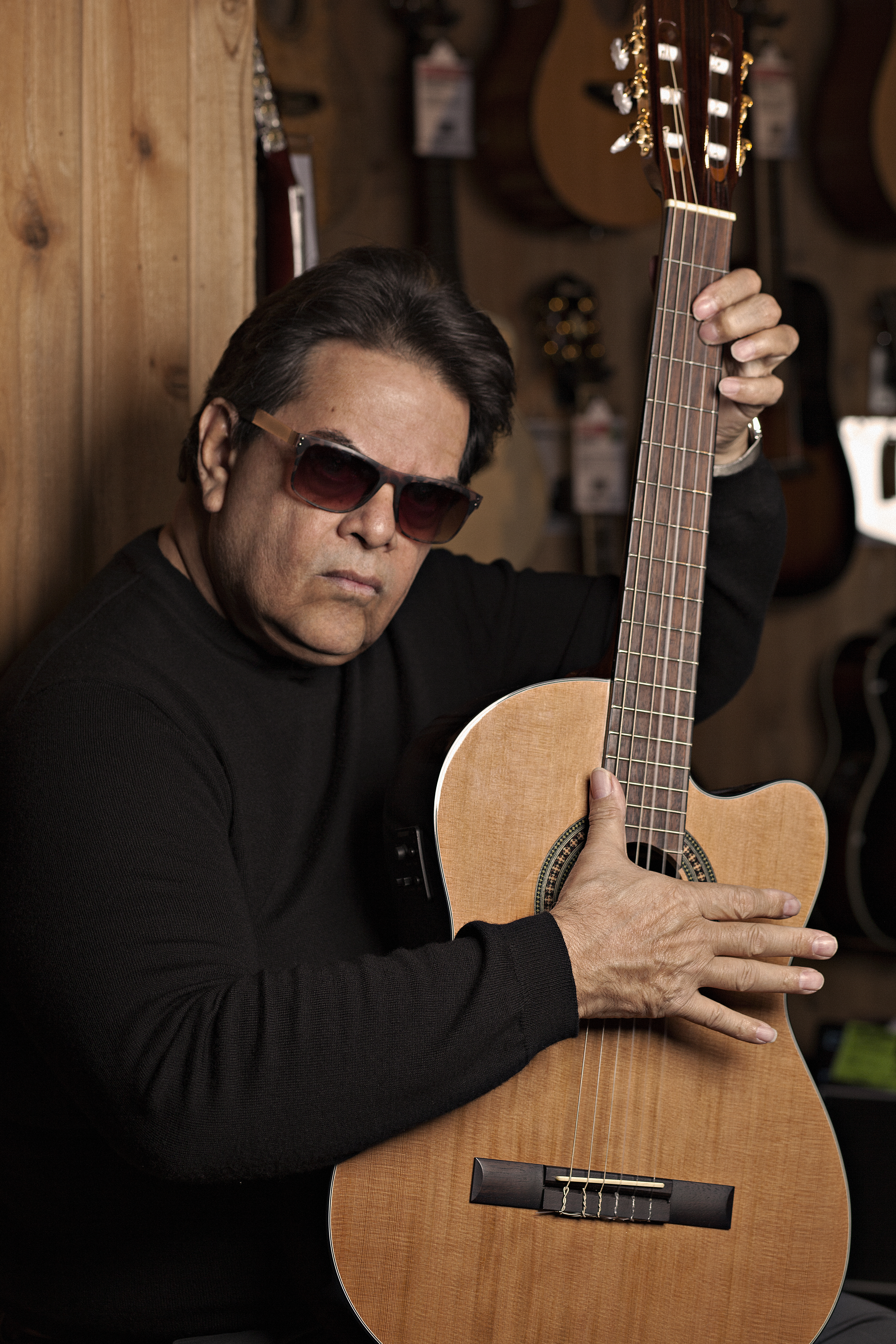
Alfonso Noel Lovo

Alfonso Noel Lovo (born August 12, 1951 in León, Nicaragua) is a Nicaraguan composer and guitarist.

As a child, only 5 years old, Alfonso Noel Lovo, saw a 48 bass red HOHNER accordion in the window of Libreria Lehman, in San Jose, Costa Rica, while on Christmas shopping, and he asked his father, to buy it. They went inside, and the salesman showed him the notes of Silent Night. Another salesman suggested to sell a smaller size accordion for children, but Lovo, wanted the one in the window. A couple of days later, on Christmas Day, it mysteriously appeared under the Christmas tree. He surprised his parents by playing the notes of Silent Night, which the salesman had shown him only two days before.

Professor Julio Max Blanco, started trying to teach him music theory, back in his native Nicaragua, in January, 1957. Lovo learned to play songs before he could read the notes. And Professor Blanco said, "He can play by ear alone, I give up." Lovo started playing accordion at the Colegio Calazanz, grammar school, at church functions. He learned to play harmonica with Father Caudelli, with the Cub Scouts, an instrument he still plays, in blues style.

At school he also sang at the Calasanz Choir, later at the Colegio Centroamerica, boarding school in Granada, Nicaragua, with the Jesuits, he self-taught Hammond B2 organ, and Piano, during long punishment hours in solitary confinement at the music room, since Lovo had become rebellious, and hard to manage. There he created his first Piano composition: 'In the Woods of the Moon', that is recorded in his first 'Terremoto' album later in New Orleans, at Knight Recording Studios.

The accordion was left alone when he picked up the guitar, that he learned from his home gardener, and guitar player, Adan 'Bienvenido' Jaime, then called the Nicaraguan Elvis, who showed him how to play Elvis Presley songs, Nicaraguan and Mexican rock ballads, popular in the early 1960s. He got his first guitar from his uncle 'Chalito', in his native town of Leon, and he learned songs from Enrique Guzman, and The Teen Tops, and from Polidecto Correa, and Los Polimusic, one of the first Nicaraguan Rock Bands. This band featured as drummer, Jose 'Chepito' Areas, future founding member of the Santana Band, famous for opening the Woodstock Rock Festival.

Lovo met Chepito Areas playing in the Half Time of a high school basketball game, and the two formed a lifelong musical friendship.

He started playing in a rock band, with Ricardo Palma, and Adan Torres, as co-founders of Los Rockets in 1963 and then co-founded Los Juniors, with Emilio Ortega, in 1965. Both Palma and Ortega, were the top lead guitar players of the Nicaragua rock movement in the 1960s. He also played with Edmundo Guerrero, a local guitar master of the Bossa Nova Brazilian jazz style.

Lovo was hijacked on a LANICA airline flight out of Miami, where he almost lost his left hand due to bullet wounds. Lovo survived and later regained the use of his hand.

In Managua, he produced the first Rock Concert, Concierto Idolo, at the Teatro Nacional Ruben Dario, in 1972, with an all star band, the members of the best known rock and jazz groups, in Nicaragua. The photo taken at the opening act, playing Mazurka in guitar, appears, as front cover of his album La Gigantona, widely acclaimed, in the tropical jazz category, in Billboard, in November 2012.

He is one of the original exponents of Nicaraguan Latin Rock. He recorded an album, Terremoto Richter 6.3 in 1973, in New Orleans, while going to school at L.S.U., Baton Rouge, LA. It is a fusion of Nicaraguan-style classic Spanish guitar with New Orleans Jazz and Gospel. His main instrument is guitar, but also plays bass, and keyboards, as well as harmonica.

He collaborated in his home town with Chepito Areas, the original percussionist with Santana Band. This connected him with that band. Together they produced the Managua Earthquake Relief concert featuring Mario Moreno AKA 'Cantinflas' in October 1972.

After the Nicaraguan Revolution, Lovo moved to the USA. In New Orleans, he got deeper into the blues guitar, influenced by New Orleans musicians and Louisiana blues-men.

In Miami, in the late '80s he recorded the song Freedom Fighters with his band "Wolf and The Pack". This song, is a mixture of rock and politics, earned him an invitation to perform at the White House.

The Miami Herald front-paged the band, then known as Alfonso Lobo and Wolf and The Pack, which led to TV interviews with CBS, NBC, ABC and Univision. The Miami PBS Channel 17, WDNA, dedicated a documentary program directed by Don Webb, to a Lovo interview and featured clips from the network coverage. In Patrick Carr's book Sunshine States, the author titled chapter 7 "The King of Contra Rock" and dedicated it to Lovo.

Lovo released La Gigantona, privately, in 2010, featuring acid Latin jazz music, with an all-star Nicaraguan band, including percussion by Areas.

The Chicago-based record label The Numero Group released Lovo's La Gigantona album to the public, in the fall of 2012. The reissue was sourced from a rare acetate and includes extensive liner notes on Alfonso Lovo, including historical photos of his musical background.

Since its re-release, La Gigantona has been a success and Lovo has been the subject of many reviews and interviews worldwide, including praises from BBC music critic Gilles Peterson radio personality in London, Relix, Dusted Magazine, Radio Nacional de Colombia, and many more international stations, and several TV shows. La Gigantona has become a well-known name, and in November 14, it reached # 4 in Billboard, Tropical music category. A new version of Wolf and The Pack has been formed in Miami, with Latin jazz players, and new performances have been seen up to the end of 2012, of La Gigantona, considered a dormant hit record, that has been awakened by Numero Group, the reissue label from Chicago.

On June 14, 2014, Lovo was invited to perform at the Rio Loco Festival, in Toulouse, and drew 28,000 fans, performing an updated version of his La Gigantona, his well-known album, with Jose 'Chepito' Areas of Santana Band fame, and a group of Cuban and Venezuelan musicians, and appeared in the French press, as his style, considered a fusion of psychedelic rock and Latin Jazz, is gaining popularity in Europe, Asia, and also in the USA.

Lovo, was also featured in Relix Magazine, in 2 occasions, on 2015 and 2016, in the magazine's CD sampler.

On May 20, 2016, Lovo performed at the Teatro Nacional Ruben Dario with an all star Nicaraguan Band, Alfonso Lovo Band, which included Chepito Areas, and a 12 piece band. An anthology of all his music was presented, and there was a documentary made of the event.

Later on June 3, Lovo and his band on a smaller sextet format, performed in Madrid, Spain, and the iconic club Sala El Sol, and later on June 5, at the Auditorium, of the Escuela de Abogados de Bilbao, in Bilbao Spain. Several interviews, including one by Gladys Palmera Radio, with a Video of performing a live version of Flamenco Immigration Blues, at the Duque de Alba Palacete in Madrid.

Lately, Lovo gained more notoriety by creating the Flamenco Immigration Blues, a work that denounces the immigration situation at the Mexico-United States border. KIQI 1010 AM Radio in San Francisco, one of the most heard Latin stations in California, interviewed Lovo in December 2016.
