= Brotherman =

Studio album by The Final Solution

Brotherman is a studio album recorded by The Final Solution in the 1970s, for an incomplete and unreleased blaxploitation film of the same name. The album was not released until 2008, when it appeared on the Numero Group label.
