= Caroline Peyton =

American singer, songwriter, and actor (1951–2021)

- Born: October 8, 1951; Brookhaven, Mississippi, U.S.
- Origin: Charleston, West Virginia, U.S.
- Died: August 11, 2021 (aged 69) Nashville, Tennessee, U.S.
- Years active: 1970–2014
- Labels: Spring Hill Music Group, The Numero Group

Caroline Peyton (October 8, 1951 – August 11, 2021) was an American singer, songwriter and actor. Peyton was born in Brookhaven, Mississippi, and grew up in Charleston, West Virginia. She recorded two albums in the 1970s, 1972's Mock Up and 1977's Intuition, which were reissued in 2009 by Chicago archival label The Numero Group. Later in her career, she appeared on Broadway and in theatrical productions. She also voiced characters in four Disney animated films in the 1990s. She released her first self-written solo album on September 9, 2014. Nashville Scene writer Skip Anderson wrote a preview of the record.

== Early life ==
Her father, Thomas Peyton, is from Virginia and her mother, the former Joan (pronounced Jo Ann) Johnson, is a native of Mississippi. Peyton grew up with two sisters and began performing with them at an early age. She attended Charleston's George Washington High School, where she participated in theatrical productions. Peyton was accepted to the Boston Conservatory of Music but enrolled at Chicago's Northwestern University in 1969. Already proficient as a guitarist and vocalist, she began performing in Chicago with fellow guitarist and singer John Guth. Peyton had previously met another singer interested in folk music, Mary Johnson, who later adopted the stage name Mary Flower. Johnson took Peyton to visit the town of Bloomington, Indiana, which had a lively music scene that utilized both local musicians and students studying music at Indiana University. Impressed by what was happening in Bloomington, Peyton moved there in 1970 and began performing with a group of musicians that included singer Bob Lucas and songwriter and producer Mark Bingham.

== Early career ==
Bingham had put together a large band with shifting membership, the Screaming Gypsy Bandits, who were influenced by jazz, rhythm-and-blues and Frank Zappa. Born in Bloomington on January 30, 1949, Bingham had spent his early years in New York state and had gone to Los Angeles, hired as an in-house songwriter and producer by California record label Elektra Records. Cut loose by Elektra, Bingham returned to Bloomington in fall 1969 and began collaborating with Peyton.

Working at a local studio owned by drummer and teacher Jack Gilfoy, Peyton and Bingham recorded what would be Peyton's first record album on a label they had begun along with a local woman named Kathy Canada, who had family connections to, and thus family money from, pharmaceutical manufacturer Eli Lilly. The label, Bar-B-Q Records, released Peyton's 1972 album Mock Up, which featured her guitar playing and vocals along with Bingham's guitar (and songwriting) and the piano of Mark Gray, who was studying jazz at Indiana University's music school. With spare performances, Mock Up featured Bingham compositions such as "Between-Two" and "Engram." The record came to the attention of Columbia Records A&R man Mark Spector, who arranged an audition with label head Clive Davis in New York City in October 1972, but they failed the audition, although Peyton says that Spector called her upon her return to Bloomington to encourage her.

As Peyton said in a 2006 Nashville Scene article, "I didn't know what I wanted, and I needed to find my own voice. Mock Up was my first recording. My father paid for it, even though I had dropped out of Northwestern. My frustration with Mark Bingham was that he was so anti-establishment. I don't think he ever re-wrote anything—it was all stream-of-consciousness. People ask me what ‘Engram’ means and I say, ‘I don't know what it means now, and I didn't know when I was singing it, and I’ll never know what it meant."

Peyton continued to perform in the Midwest, and the Screaming Gypsy Bandits became well known in the region. They opened for many big-name acts in the early 1970s, including a 1970 date with Captain Beefheart and the Magic Band at Cincinnati's Ludlow Garage. With Peyton on vocals, the Screaming Gypsy Bandits recorded an LP that was released in 1973. In the Eye received a favorable review in the jazz magazine Down Beat.

Working again with Bingham, Peyton recorded another album in sessions that stretched from late 1974 until 1977. Released in 1977, Intuition featured songs by Bingham and Peyton and was reviewed in Rolling Stone.

Peyton moved to Los Angeles in 1977, where she performed in local clubs, recorded demos for record-label impresario Mike Curb and appeared on a couple of television shows—most notably the Dinah Shore show and the Gong Show.

In the early 1980s Peyton began performing in theatrical productions. Kevin Kline knew her from Indiana University and recommended her for the part of Mabel in Joe Papp's Pirates of Penzance. She got the role and got her Equity Card. She was featured prominently in both the Los Angeles company and the Broadway national touring company of the show and in 1984 made her Broadway debut as Mary Arena in Galt MacDermot's The Human Comedy.

In the late 1980s and early 1990s, Peyton was recommended for auditions in Disney films through friends and wound up recording vocals for four Disney animated movies: Beauty and the Beast, Aladdin, Pocahontas and The Hunchback of Notre Dame.

== Later career ==
Peyton moved to Williamson County, Tennessee in 1993 and recorded a collection of Celtic Christmas songs on the Green Hill label. Ubiquity Records featured a track from Intuition, "Just as We," on a compilation, Gilles Peterson Digs America:Brownswood, U.S.A. In 2006 the Chicago record label The Numero Group included "Engram"—a track from Mock Up—on their anthology of female singer-songwriters, Wayfaring Strangers: Ladies from the Canyon. Asterisk, an imprint of Numero, reissued Mock Up and Intuition in January 2009, with archival photos, extra tracks, liner notes and a video of Peyton performing in 1972 at Indianapolis club the Hummingbird Cafe. Both albums had been previously reissued in limited editions in Japan.

In February 2009, Peyton performed a set of songs drawn from her 1970s albums at Nashville club the Basement, and in May re-united with Bingham and Bob Lucas at a concert in Bloomington. As she told reporter Ron Wynn of Nashville's City Paper, "I guess I was just ahead of my time. It was what I call art songs. We really didn't think much about whether they might be commercial or not. I know there are some incredible players on these recordings, guys who’ve gone on to make great records with other people." She also performed infrequently in Nashville.

== Death ==
After being retired for many years, Peyton died in Nashville, Tennessee on August 11, 2021, at age 69 from neuropathy. She suffered terribly for a year before she died. She couldn't walk or use her hands for the last 7 months of her life. She had 24/7 care and eventually died peacefully in hospice. Her identical twin girls are Lila Angelique, of Tribal Baroque, the wife of S.K. Thoth, who won an Oscar for best mini doc made of his life, called THOTH, by Sarah Kernochan. Her other child, Jamie Harkin, received her MFA in Performance from the University of Southern Mississippi in 2020 and currently resides in Nashville, Tennessee. She is dating famed horror and fantasy artist, Nick Stevens, of Art from the Crypt. Her former husband, Lila and Jamie's father, Brendan Harkin, of the rock band, Starz, had a professional recording studio in Franklin, Tennessee for many years and currently resides in Stuart, Florida with his wife.

== Discography ==
- Mock Up (Bar-B-Q, 1972; Asterisk/Numero Group 2009)
- Back to Doghead (with the Screaming Gypsy Bandits, recorded 1970–1972; Piety Street Files and Archaic Media, 2009)
- In the Eye (with the Screaming Gypsy Bandits, Bar-B-Q, 1973)
- Bloomington I (compilation of Bar-B-Q records artists, 1976)
- Intuition (Bar-B-Q, 1977; Asterisk/Numero Group 2009)
- Celtic Christmas Spirit (Green Hill, 1998)
- Gilles Peterson Digs America: Brownswood U.S.A. (Ubiquity, 2005)
- Wayfaring Strangers: Ladies from the Canyon (Numero Group, 2006)
- Homeseeker's Paradise (Peytunes, 2014)
