= Cult Cargo: Belize City Boil Up =

Compilation album by Various artists
- Released: 2005
- Genre: Funk, world
- Label: The Numero Group
- Producer: Tom Lunt, Ken Shipley, Rob Sevier,

Various artists chronology
Fern Jones: The Glory Road (2004)	Cult Cargo: Belize City Boil Up (2005)	Eccentric Soul: The Deep City Label (2006)

Professional ratings
Review scores
Source	Rating
Allmusic	4/5 stars
Pitchfork Media	(8.8/10)

Cult Cargo: Belize City Boil Up is the sixth release by The Numero Group. The release documents Compton Fairweather's circle of musical influence in the tiny nation of Belize.

== Track listing ==
1. "Disco Connection" - Lord Rhaburn
2. "Can't Go Halfway" - Harmonettes
3. "Guajida" - Jesus Acosta & The Professionals
4. "The Same Old Me" - The Web
5. "A Part of Being with You" - The Professionals
6. "More Love Reggae" - Lord Rhaburn
7. "The Back Stabbers" - The Professionals
8. "Rated G" - The Web
9. "Shame Shame Shame" - Harmonettes
10. "Funky Jive Part II" - Soul Creations
11. "Don't Fight It" - Lord Rhaburn
12. "Long Time Boy" - Nadia Cattouse
13. "Boogaloo a La Chuck" - Lord Rhaburn
14. "Theme from the Godfather" - The Professionals
15. "Things Are Going to Work Out Right" - The Web
16. "Funky Jive Part I" - Soul Creations
