= Purple Snow: Forecasting the Minneapolis Sound =

2013 compilation album by various artists

Compilation album by Various artists
- Released: December 3, 2013
- Length: 140:30
- Label: The Numero Group
- Producer: Rob Sevier, Ken Shipley, Jon Kirby
- Compiler: Jon Kirby

Purple Snow: Forecasting the Minneapolis Sound is a 2013 compilation album released by The Numero Group that chronicles the history of Minneapolis funk music scene. The album took two years to develop by Jon Kirby who traveled to find obscure recordings in Minneapolis and interview various artists and people of the era.

== Production ==
Purple Snow was compiled by former Wax Poetics editor Jon Kirby. The project took two years to develop and involved Kirby travelling from Numero Group's office in Chicago to Minneapolis. His research also included making phone calls, writing letters with his first meeting being with a woman named Kim Johnson who was in a group called Best Kept Secret who warned that creating this album would be extremely difficult.

13 of the 32 tracks were originally unreleased., while some of the singles that had tracks included on the release were originally only pressed to 500 copies, and sold to church groups and older high school friends. Others, such as André Cymone's "Somebody Said" were unreleased, which were in a shoebox for decades. Kirby specifically spoke about the help of Charles Chambliss photographs from the era, which assisted in his research, explaining that "A lot of the people I talked to had forgotten about their stuff. But when I reminded them by showing them pictures or mentioning names, they would remember all kinds of stories. It was an amazing experience."

== Release ==
Purple Snow: Forecasting the Minneapolis Sound was released by The Numero Group on December 3, 2013. The album was released on double compact disc and four vinyl box set. The album included liner notes in a hardbound, full-color book. Kirby's liner notes for the album were later nominated for Best Album Notes at the 57th Annual Grammy Awards.

== Reception ==
Professional ratings
Aggregate scores
Source	Rating
Metacritic	83/100
Review scores
Source	Rating
AllMusic	4/5 stars
Pitchfork	(8.4/10)
NME	4/5 stars
Spin	4/5 stars

On Metacritic, the album received an 83 out of 100 average rating indicating "Universal acclaim" from an average of 10 critics.

== Track listing ==
=== CD version ===
Disc One
No.	Title	Performers	Length
1.	"If You See Me"	94 East	5:44
2.	"Taste Of Love"	Aura	3:29
3.	"I Love You"	Herman Jones	4:17
4.	"Oh Lover"	Orville Shannon	3:03
5.	"I'm Under Your Spell"	Mind & Matter	3:28
6.	"Waiting For The Moment"	Haze	3:27
7.	"Get It On"	The Prophets Of Peace	3:10
8.	"Expense"	Dwayne White & The Cohesion Band	3:46
9.	"Sunshine Lady"	Mind & Matter	4:09
10.	"Higher"	The Lewis Connection	6:58
11.	"It's The Things That You Do"	Flyte Tyme	4:49
12.	"Ladie"	Herman Jones	4:55
13.	"You're All I Need"	Michael Dixon & J.O.Y.	3:48
14.	"Stone Lover"	Music, Love & Funk	7:13
15.	"Cohesion"	Dwayne White & The Cohesion Band	2:51
16.	"I Do Love My Lady"	Haze	4:06
17.	"Got To Be Something Here"	The Lewis Connection	4:17

Disc Two
No.	Title	Performers	Length
1.	"I Have Love At Home"	Walter Lewis & The Blue Stars	5:20
2.	"I Got You On My Mind"	Flyte Tyme	5:06
3.	"Can You Deal With It"	Quiet Storm	4:34
4.	"Quick"	Steven	3:22
5.	"If You Love Me"	The Stylle Band	3:03
6.	"I've Got My Eyes On You"	The Girls	4:03
7.	"Should I Or Should I Not?"	Sue Ann Carwell	3:17
8.	"Do You Dare"	Alexander O'Neal	6:06
9.	"Contagious"	Ronnie Robbins	4:48
10.	"Borrowed Time"	Alexander O'Neal	4:36
11.	"One Life To Live"	Orville Shannon	3:05
12.	"Somebody Said"	André Cymone	4:23
13.	"Do It Baby Do It"	Walter Lewis & The Blue Stars	4:25
14.	"Together"	Rockie Robbins	5:00
15.	"No One Else Can Do It To Me Baby"	Mind & Matter	7:00
