= Penny and the Quarters =

American soul band

Penny & the Quarters is a "lost" soul band that came to prominence in 2010 after an unreleased demo of its song "You And Me" was used in the film Blue Valentine. Teenagers at the time, the members of Penny & the Quarters were invited to audition by Harmonic Sounds Studio in Columbus, Ohio, recording three demo songs in all. The group consisted of Nannie "Penny" Coulter (Sharpe), and her three brothers, Johnny, Donald and William.

The songs were recorded sometime between 1970 and 1975 at either Harmonic Sounds Studio or at the home of studio co-owner Clem Price in Columbus. Relegated to storage, the songs were discovered after Price's death in 2006 when a collection of tapes and acetate records was purchased at his estate sale.

Donald Coulter died on June 4, 2014, at the age of 67.

== "You and Me" ==
One of the songs the group recorded, "You and Me", was released by The Numero Group and later was heard by actor Ryan Gosling, who recommended it to the director Derek Cianfrance as the song meant to bring the two lead characters together in Blue Valentine.

The Numero Group announced in 2011 that it was actively seeking members of Penny and the Quarters or their surviving relatives in order to share the growing record royalties from "You and Me". Ken Shipley of Numero Group told reporters: "We have played this recording to over 100 movers and shakers from the time and no one has a clue." The members were identified in 2011 as Nannie "Penny" (Coulter) Sharpe and her brothers William Preston Coulter, Johnny Coulter and Donald Coulter. Jay Robinson, a singer associated with the siblings, died in 2009.

=== In popular culture ===
Since Blue Valentine, the song has appeared in many other contexts, mostly in American media, including:

- Sampled by Vince Kidd on his single "You & Me", released in June 2013.
- The "Wonderful Life" IKEA advert campaign in April 2016.
- An Oreo advertising campaign in 2017.
- Covered by Durand Jones & The Indications in 2018.
- In L.L.Bean's advertising campaign starting in November 2021.
- In Ginny and Georgia season 1, episode 2.
- During the end credits of the third episode of the second season of the HBO series Somebody Somewhere.
- In "The Three Kisses" episode of The Just Enough Family podcast.
- It was used in the 2023 television series Will Trent.
- In the Netflix series Outer Banks (2023) and Baby Fever.
- In the Apple TV+ original series The Big Door Prize in the season 2 episode "Back In The Saddle".
- In the Amazon Prime movie You're Cordially Invited with Will Ferrell and Reese Witherspoon
- In the HBO series Girls in the season 6 episode "Gummies”.
- In the Amazon Prime series Upload in the season 4 episode "Mile End”.
- On the football trivia podcast Career We Go it is sometimes used as a mid-episode break overlaid with quotes from football managers Arsene Wenger and Jose Mourinho about one another.
- In the Netflix series todas las veces que nos enamoramos (2023) season 1 episode 7
