= The Edge of Daybreak =

R&B/Soul musical group

The Edge of Daybreak is an American soul/funk band formed in Virginia in the late 1970s. The band released a single album, Eyes of Love, in 1979.

== History ==
Band members Jamal Jaha Nubi, James Carrington, Cornelius Cade, Harry Coleman, McEvoy Robinson (who had previously played with Otis Redding), Willie Williams, and others met and started playing music together while incarcerated at Powhatan Correctional Center in the late 1970s.

Milton Hogue, a friend of Carrington's and the owner of Bohannon's record shop in Richmond, Virginia, took an interest in recording the band after hearing some of their music. On September 14, 1979, the band recorded 8 original songs live at Powhatan, in a single take, over the course of 5 hours. The resulting album, titled Eyes of Love, was released later in 1979. It was recorded on a budget of $3000, and only 1000 copies were pressed. The album received some local attention and radio airplay in the Richmond area, but remained relatively obscure until it was reissued in 2015.

Within a year of recording Eyes of Love, some members of the band were moved to other facilities, effectively leading to the demise of the band.

A short documentary about the band, entitled Edge of Daybreak: The Real Jailhouse Rock, was created by filmmaker Alix Lambert and published in The Atlantic.

== Discography ==
=== Albums ===
- Eyes of Love (1979)

== Members ==
- Jamal Jaha Nubi (lead vocals, drums)
- James Carrington (keyboards)
- Cornelius Cade (guitar)
- Harry Coleman (additional vocals, percussion)
- McEvoy Robinson (bass)
- Willie Williams (percussion)

According to some sources there were 10 members in total.
