= The Numero Group =

American archival record label

Numero Group
- Founded: 2003
- Distributor: Secretly Label Group
- Genre: Various
- Country of origin: US
- Location: Chicago, Illinois
- Official website: www.numerogroup.com

The Numero Group is an archival record label that creates compilations of previously released music, reissues original albums, and creates album reconstructions from a variety of musical genres. The label, known as Numero, was founded in 2003 by Rob Sevier, Ken Shipley (a former A&R manager for the equally eclectic Rykodisc label), and Tom Lunt. The label's focus since founding has been to research and preserve obscure recorded material and ephemera by artists and entrepreneurs who found little commercial success upon their material's initial release.

In 2013, Numero became part of a partnership with Secretly Label Group.

== History ==
In 2003, Sevier had the idea for the label's first release, Eccentric Soul: The Capsoul Label. After losing his job at Rykodisc, Shipley had inherited a record from the band Antena with the desire to issue a rerelease. With these two albums, both men had the idea of starting an American record label modelled after Soul Jazz Records and Honest Jon's. After crossing paths with Shipley in a Grocery Store, Lunt provided roughly $23,000 for the initial phase of the project.

This first release, Eccentric Soul: The Capsoul Label, was a reissue of rare soul and R&B music originally released by the defunct Capsoul label, which was founded in Columbus, Ohio, by William Roger "Bill" Moss.

While originally imagined as a reissue label focused on releasing obscure music that had not, or would not otherwise have been successful without rerelease, Numero has reissued music from several notable names that achieved or approached major-label status, including Husker Du, Syl Johnson and Blondie.

In addition to their reissues of out-of-print soul, gospel, funk, rock and folk of the 1960s-80s, beginning in the 2010s Numero has also reissued several indie rock, post-hardcore and emo bands from the 1980s onward, such as Duster, Unwound, Codeine, Karate, Blonde Redhead, Everyone Asked About You, and The American Analog Set.

Other notable releases from the label’s catalog include:

- Ork Records: New York, York, a 4xLP box set compiling recordings from New York City’s new wave/punk label Ork Records
- Purple Snow (Forecasting The Minneapolis Sound), a 4xLP box set compiling early synth-funk and modern soul recordings from Minnesota
- I Shall Wear A Crown, a 5xLP box set compiling the recordings of Chicago gospel singer Pastor T.L. Barrett
- Segue To Infinity, a 4xLP box set compiling the early works of new age musician Laraaji
- Words And Music, a 3xLP box set compiling the discography of singer-songwriter and jazz musician Margo Guryan

== Releases ==
Similar to other reissue labels such as Rhino, Bear Family, Ace, Cherry Red, and Hip-O, Numero releases feature extensive liner notes and rare photographs that provide context for the associated recordings. 2009's Local Customs: Downriver Revival was expanded to include a DVD containing a documentary and an additional 200 recordings to "dig" through.

Numero has also released books, including comprehensive illustrated encyclopedias for soul records from Illinois and Ohio.

For Record Store Day 2009, the Numero group produced a vinyl-only sampler named This LP Crashes Hard Drives, which included not only a track from an upcoming Numero release ("Sam" from 029 Pisces: A Lovely Sight), but also tracks from such labels as Light In The Attic, Honest Jon's, Now Again, Sublime Frequencies, Daptone Records, Jazzman, and Vampisoul.

In 2014, Numero released a role-playing game in conjunction with their proto-metal compilation Cities of Darkscorch. In 2018, Numero re-released all 22 of Irv Teibel’s Environments albums in the form of a downloadable app.

Several tracks licensed for reissue by The Numero Group have made appearances in film and television. "You And Me" by Penny & The Quarters, which was featured on 2007's Eccentric Soul: The Prix Label compilation, was used in the 2010 film Blue Valentine. During the film's theatrical run, the identity of Penny & The Quarters was unknown and the Numero Group was actively seeking contact with band members or their relatives. Later, it was revealed that Penny of Penny & The Quarters had been Nannie Sharpe, née Coulter, whose daughter Jayma had heard from friends about the film's use of her mother's song. In 2012, Chuck and Mac's "Powerful Love"—which Numero included on 2007's Eccentric Soul: Twinight's Lunar Rotation compilation—made a prominent appearance in Rian Johnson's sci-fi action film Looper. In 2016, "Our Love" by The Edge of Daybreak was included in the film Moonlight.
