= Zane Musa =

- Born: Zane Musa; January 1, 1979; Arleta, CA
- Died: February 2, 2015 (aged 36) Fort Lauderdale, FL
- Genres: Jazz-funk
- Instrument: Saxophone
- Labels: Straight Ahead Recordings

Zane Musa (January 1, 1979 – February 2, 2015) was an alto/soprano/tenor saxophonist and vocalist. Musa was raised in the San Fernando Valley in Los Angeles. His works have been showcased by artists including Arturo Sandoval, Roy Hargrove, Macy Gray, John Mayer, Lupe Fiasco, Christina Aguilera, The Nikhil Korula Band, and Karina Corradini. He played in the house bands of several television shows, including The Voice, Jimmy Kimmel Live! and The Carson Daly Show. He was a regular player in Hollywood clubs and was invited to play with several bands, including Jeff Goldblum and the Mildred Snitzer Orchestra. Some of his final work was touring and recording with Arturo Sandoval. He was featured on Sandoval's recording, "Be Bop."

Musa's solo jazz CD/LP was released under the independent label Straight Ahead Records, founded by Bernie Grundman and Stewart Levine, producers for various artists including Dave Sandburn, Simply Red, Jamie Cullum, and The Crusaders.

As a soloist, bandleader, and sideman, Musa has performed in venues including the Playboy Jazz Festival, Lincoln Center, IAJE conventions in Atlanta and New York City, the Syracuse Jazz Festival, the Blue Whale, and Catalina.

Although Musa's roots were in classic and improvisational jazz, he also worked to bring forth a blend of jazz and funk.

== Early years ==
Musa began his musical career studying tap dance with his brother, Chance Taylor. By junior high school, Musa began playing the saxophone and made it his main focus. He went to Van Nuys High School in the Performing Arts Magnet Program. He received his music degree from the California Institute of the Arts, where he received a full scholarship.

== Personal life ==
Musa had four siblings: his brother, tap teacher and musical inspiration Chance Taylor; his brothers Omar and Sam Musa; and his sister Yasmin Manley. His mother, Rebecca Musa, and father, Awad Musa, encouraged his musical career from the start. The Los Angeles Times featured a story on July 9, 2002, about Musa performing saxophone in Skid Row alongside bassist Ravi Knypstra.

== Notability ==
Don Heckman saw Musa at the Catalina Jazz Club when he was 17 years old and commented that he was "a name to remember." He has played for Arturo Sandoval, Roy Hargrove, Macy Gray, Christina Aguilera, and John Mayer. Rhythm Planet called him one of the most talented saxophonists in the LA jazz scene.

== Death ==
Musa died on February 2, 2015, in Florida. He fell from a Fort Lauderdale Airport parking structure after playing at an annual jazz cruise the night of February 1. He was transported to Broward Health Hospital, where he was declared dead the following day.

== Discography ==
- (2005) Introducing Zane Musa, (Straight Ahead Recordings)

=== Credits ===
- (2014) Heaven – Robert Francis & the Night Tide (Saxophone)
- (2014) Moving On – Kan Wakan (Saxophone)
- (2013) The Best Man Holiday (soundtrack) (Saxophone)
- (2012) Dear Diz (Every Day I Think of You) – Arturo Sandoval (Featured guest artist, alto saxophone)
- (2011) Endless Planets, – Austin Peralta (Alto saxophone)
- (2009) JLB Jazz Collective With Jason Gamer – JLB Jazz Collective (Alto saxophone)
- (2009) Reminiscence: Live! – Phil Ranelin (Group member, alto saxophone)
- (2005) Gravity Always Wins – Dave Tough (Saxophone)
- (2005) Static Trampoline – Chris Pierce (Alto saxophone)
- (2004) Inspiration – Phil Ranelin (Main personnel, alto saxophone, soprano saxophone)
- (2004) The Mother Funk Conspiracy – Mother Funk Conspiracy (Main personnel, alto saxophone)
- (2003) The War of Women – Joe Firstman (Saxophone)
- (2001) Orcastra – Jon Bare (Group member, Saxophone)
- (1999) Christmas Party Pack [Delta] (Saxophone)
- (1999) Holiday Moods (Alto saxophone, tenor saxophone)
- (1997) Holiday Sax Fantasy (Primary artist, alto saxophone, tenor saxophone)
- (1997) Ultimate Christmas Party Pack (Primary artist, saxophone)
