= Nikhil Korula =

American singer-songwriter (born 1978)

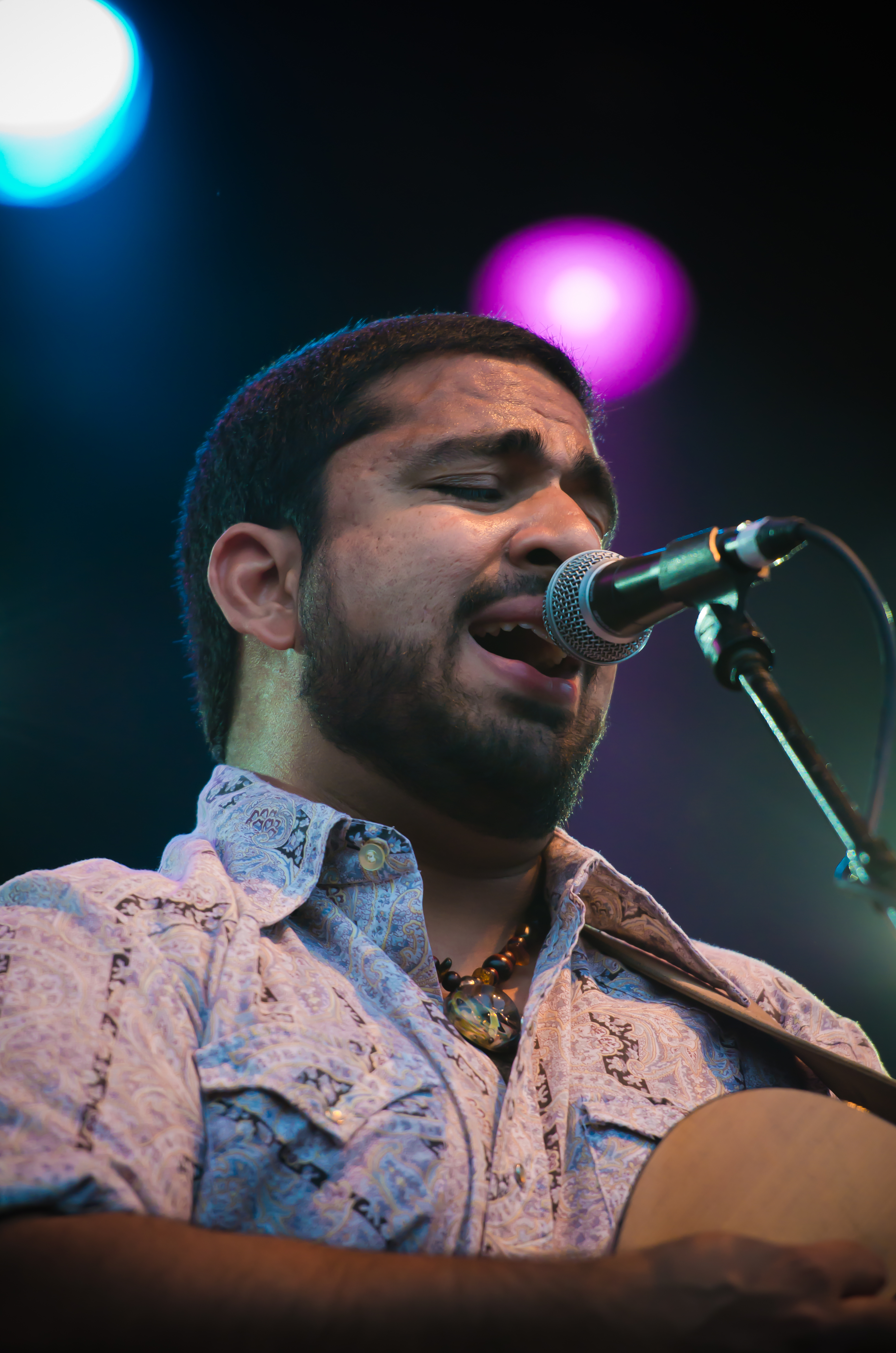

Background information
- Born: December 27, 1978 (age 47); Canada
- Origin: Arcadia, California, United States
- Genres: Rock, acoustic, folk, singer-songwriter, funk, blues, jazz, world, adult contemporary, reggae fusion, calypso
- Occupations: Singer-songwriter, vocalist, bandleader, label owner, educator
- Instruments: Vocals, guitar (acoustic and electric)
- Years active: 2001–present
- Label: Groove Infinity Records
- Website: nkband.com

Nikhil Korula (born December 27, 1978) is an Indian American singer-songwriter, bandleader, and label owner, known as founder and front-man of The Nikhil Korula Band, or NK Band.

Based in Los Angeles, California, Korula has released seven albums and EPs on his independent record label Groove Infinity Records, including The Freedom EP (2003), The Way Things Work (2004), Acoustic B-Sides & Rarities EP (2007), the two-disc album Live Vibes (2010), Music of the New Day (2012), Solo Sessions EP (2013) with Jeff Coffin and Butch Taylor, and A Decade in the Sun (2014).

Korula frequently tours with the Nikhil Korula Band, and has performed at festivals such as Bonnaroo, the Playboy Jazz Festival, SXSW, and Summerfest. He has also headlined venues such as House of Blues and the Viper Room, as well as numerous college campuses. The group has opened for bands and artists such as Jason Mraz, John Mayer, The Roots, Erykah Badu, and Rusted Root. Korula and the band have also had songs featured on the soundtracks of shows such as Greek, Burn Notice, The Real World, and Guiding Light.

In 2014, the music video for Korula's song "Fade Away" directed by Jethro Rothe-Kushel won Best Music Video Film at Indie Fest in Southern California, as well as several other film festivals.

== Early life and education ==
Nikhil Korula was born on December 27, 1978, in Canada. After moving to the United States with his parents, he was raised in Arcadia, California, near Los Angeles.

Classically trained as a boy soprano since the age of five, at age seven Korula became the youngest founding member of the Los Angeles Children's Chorus. He performed at Carnegie Hall with the group at age 10 along with Doreen Rao in May 1990, and that year he sang on the soundtrack for the horror film Nightbreed, one of the first film scores composed by Danny Elfman. Also in 1990, he performed with Mike and the Mechanics for the televised 1990 Grammy Awards, which was titled The Living Years. According to Korula, it was meeting Miles Davis backstage at the Grammys that sparked his long-term interest in jazz. He also shared stages with opera singers such as Placido Domingo, with whom he and the choir performed six operas such as Tosca, Carmen, and Othello. Performing on stage with pop artists such as Barry Manilow and Luther Vandross as well, other gigs as a child included Rod Stewart's wedding in 1993.

After his voice changed at age fourteen, Korula began singing in the jazz choir at Arcadia High School. In 1997, he began attending the University of Southern California, studying operatic performance at the university's Thornton School of Music. He soon shifted his focus from opera to jazz, which led him to explore other genres such as world music. He developed a specific fascination with African music after visiting Kenya and Johannesburg in 1999, while his classes also shaped his changing musical interests. Stated Korula, "I studied [at USC] four years and was heavily influenced by jazz there, so I took a songwriting class that changed my life. It made me want to start a band.... The biggest factor came when I saw the Dave Matthews Band live and knew that's what I wanted to do." He graduated from USC in 2001 with a degree in Operatic Vocal Performance.

== Career ==
=== 2002–2004: Founding The Nikhil Korula Band ===
"I'll Stand Alone"
Excerpt of the band's track "I'll Stand Alone"

Upon graduating Korula began working as a singer-songwriter in Los Angeles, largely performing acoustic music with a guitar. Early on he collaborated with jazz musicians around the city, teaming up with guitarist Anthony King in 2002 and performing as an acoustic duo at open mics, coffeehouses, and music venues. In 2002 he also collaborated with saxophonist Dan Boissy and harmonica player Marcus Milius. Once he began playing with a regular lineup, in 2002 Korula founded The Nikhil Korula Band, or The NK Band. The group blends calypso, rock, reggae, African and Latin sounds. Their first performance as a sextet was a sold-out show at the Knitting Factory on July 25, 2002.

Their debut release, The Freedom EP, was released in 2003, and like all Korula's later albums it was published on his Groove Infinity Records imprint. The EP led to the band recording a full-length album at Ocean Way Studios in Hollywood. Titled The Way Things Work, the LP came out in 2004. In response, Relix magazine wrote that Korula's music mixes "part Dave Matthews guitar licks and sax solos alongside world-music beats...Korula's new album, The Way Things Work, displays the six-piece's own western/tribal dichotomy".

=== 2005–2012: Touring and live album ===
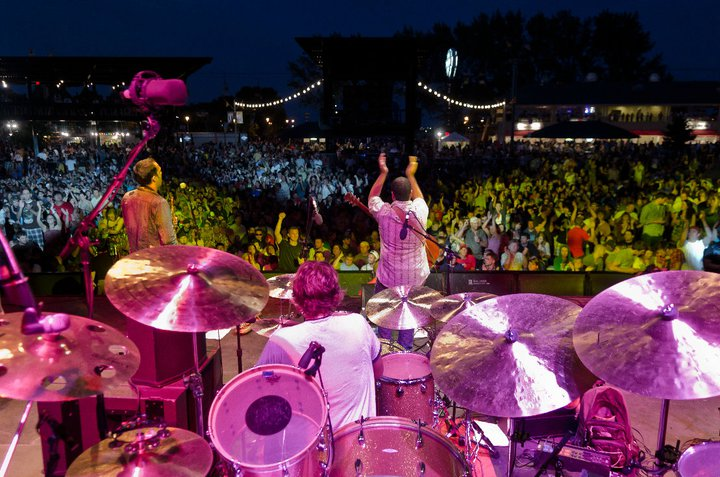
The NK Band at Summerfest 2011

Touring intermittently, the NK Band performed at the House of Blues in December 2006 with a lineup consisting of Korula, Anthony King, Leo Nobre, Dan Boissy, Adam Gust and Jack Lees. They were described as a buzz band by Kevin Bronson of the Los Angeles Times in 2006, who wrote that "think of the Nikhil Korula Band as the rainbow snow cone of the local rock scene: plenty of flavors, all adding up to something cool and sweet. Afro-beats, Latin grooves, calypso, jazz".

Their EP Acoustic B-Sides & Rarities came out in 2007, and that September they opened for the Dave Matthews Band. They have also performed at festivals such as Summerfest from 2007 to 2014, where they opened for O.A.R. in June 2007, Bonnaroo in 2008 and 2009, Sunset Junction Street Fair, JazzReggae Festival @ UCLA, and SXSW. Beyond headlining over twenty shows at the House of Blues, they have also headlined venues such as The Mint, The Roxy on the Sunset Strip, Temple Bar, the Viper Room, numerous college campuses, and the Key Club. On April 4, 2010, Nikhil Korula traveled to New York City to perform solo along with the Apollo House Band at the Apollo Theater.

The NK Band's 2010 double album Live Vibes captures their live performances, and includes twenty original songs performed in front of the band's hometown audience. The band's track "Stay For A While" was included on Greek (ABC Family) episode "I Know What You Did Last Semester," which aired January 2010. The band headlined at the Playboy Jazz Festival's Community Concert in June 2011, with co-headliners including drummer Ndugu Chancler and guitarist Doc Powell, and opened for Ben Harper at Summerfest 2011 in Milwaukee, Wisconsin, to an audience of over ten thousand.

=== 2012–2014: Recent albums ===
"Music of the New Day"
Excerpt of the band's track "Music of the New Day", released in 2013

Released in 2012, the NK Band's studio album Music of the New Day consists of all original tracks, excluding a Bo Diddly cover of "Before You Accuse Me." Music of the New Day also features The Regiment Horns, known for performing and recording with artists such as Justin Timberlake as well as Marty Rifkin, [[pedal steel guitar]]ist for Bruce Springsteen and Tom Petty. "A Song for L.A." from the album has also been featured at home games for teams such as the Los Angeles Lakers, Los Angeles Clippers, and Los Angeles Kings. As of late 2012, the band was receiving radio airplay on 45 stations in 25 states, as well as in countries such as Australia, India, New Zealand and the United Kingdom.

In early 2013, Korula continued to tour with the NK Band, for example performing an acoustic performance for the Milwaukee Journal Sentinel at Summerfest in June 2013, which included a performance of his new song "Broken Roads", included later on Solo Sessions. It was at Summerfest that the band also opened for Gavin DeGraw on June 26, 2013, performing to an audience of over 10,000 people. Korula and the band also performed at the 2013 Sundance Film Festival as part of the "Concerts at Sundance" music series. As of 2013, Korula also was making periodic appearances as a solo acoustic artist. He also performed on Wisconsin Tonight two years in a row.

=== 2013: Solo Sessions ===
In 2012 Korula recorded Solo Sessions, collaborating with members of the NK Band and two members of the Dave Matthew Band – Jeff Coffin (saxophone) and Butch Taylor (keyboards). All songs on the EP are original. Officially released on July 9, 2013, that day the band also held a release party while headlining the House of Blues Sunset Strip. Also in July 2013, Korula performed a solo acoustic set on SCVTV's House Blend, a television show based in Santa Clarita, California.

The lead single from the EP, "Fade Away", was released prior to the EP, and as of July 7, 2013, was inside the Top 20 on FMQB's Hot A/C airplay chart, after initially debuting at number 106. It peaked at number 10 on the AC Radio Chart (also titled MQB's "Friday Morning Quarterback Inc." Hot Adult Contemporary Radio chart).

Stephen K. Peeples of House Blend commented that the EP's lyrics and concepts are "more introspective than on much of his previous work with his band". He further stated that the "music is soulful and adventurous, drawing from multicultural roots, and translates easily from solo to the full band arrangements fans will [see live]".

=== 2014: Recent projects ===
Solo Sessions was followed by Korula's solo acoustic album A Decade in the Sun, recorded at Sun Studio in Memphis, Tennessee. Korula toured with the NK Band in support of the album, and as of 2014 the group had opened for bands and artists such as Jason Mraz, John Mayer, The Roots, Erykah Badu, and Rusted Root. Other artists the NK Band has performed with include Los Lonely Boys, Tim Reynolds, Page McConnell of Phish, The Calling, Colin Hay (Men at Work), Les Claypool, Common Sense, the Dan Band, Gavin Degraw, Ray Lamontagne, Sublime with Rome, and Thievery Corporation. Korula and the band have also had songs featured on the soundtracks of shows such as Greek on ABC Family, Burn Notice, The Real World on MTV and CBS's Guiding Light.

In 2014, the music video for "Fade Away" won Best Music Video Film at Indie Fest in Southern California. The music video, directed by Jethro Rothe-Kushel, was also an official selection for the NYC Independent Film Festival in 2014. As of late 2014, the video had won five film awards for best music video, including film festivals such as the Yosemite Film Festival, Alaska Film Festival, and Studio City Film Festival.

== Style and influences ==
Despite his operatic influences, Korula's songwriting for the NK Band verges closer to jazz, adult contemporary, funk, and blues. About the style of his music, which blends "Afro-beats, Latin grooves, calypso, jazz", Korula has stated that "I think the turning point for me was visiting Africa in 1999. There was so much rhythm, energy and harmony to African music, I really felt at home."

Korula has referenced artist such as Sting, Peter Gabriel, Paul Simon, Stevie Wonder and Prince, as influences, as well as singer-songwriters such as Dave Matthews, John Mayer, and Jason Mraz. About his themes, Korula has stated they tend to carry a message of "love, honor, peace and promise". Devon Wendell of The International Review of Music compared Korula to other artists such as James Blunt, Jason Mraz, and Dave Mathews, but stated that "Korula's imaginative melodic sense and rich harmonies set him apart from his contemporaries".

The NK Band frequently incorporates improvisation into their live shows.

== Personal life ==
As of 2013 Korula lived in Beverly Hills, California, where he moved in 2003. He previously spent three years teaching songwriting and music production classes at the Los Angeles Music Academy in Pasadena, California, and has served as a producer for a number of young musicians.

== Awards and nominations ==
Selected awards and nominations for the Nikhil Korula Band
Year	Award	Nominated work	Category	Result
2014	The Indie Fest	"Fade Away" by Nikhil Korula	Best Music; Video	Won
2014	LA Cinema Festival of Hollywood	"Fade Away" by Nikhil Korula	Best Music; Video	Won
2014	Studio City Film Festival	"Fade Away" by Nikhil Korula	Best Music; Video	Won
2014	Yosemite Film Festival	"Fade Away" by Nikhil Korula	Best Music; Video	Won
2014	Alaska Film Festival	"Fade Away" by Nikhil Korula	Best Music; Video	Won

== Discography ==
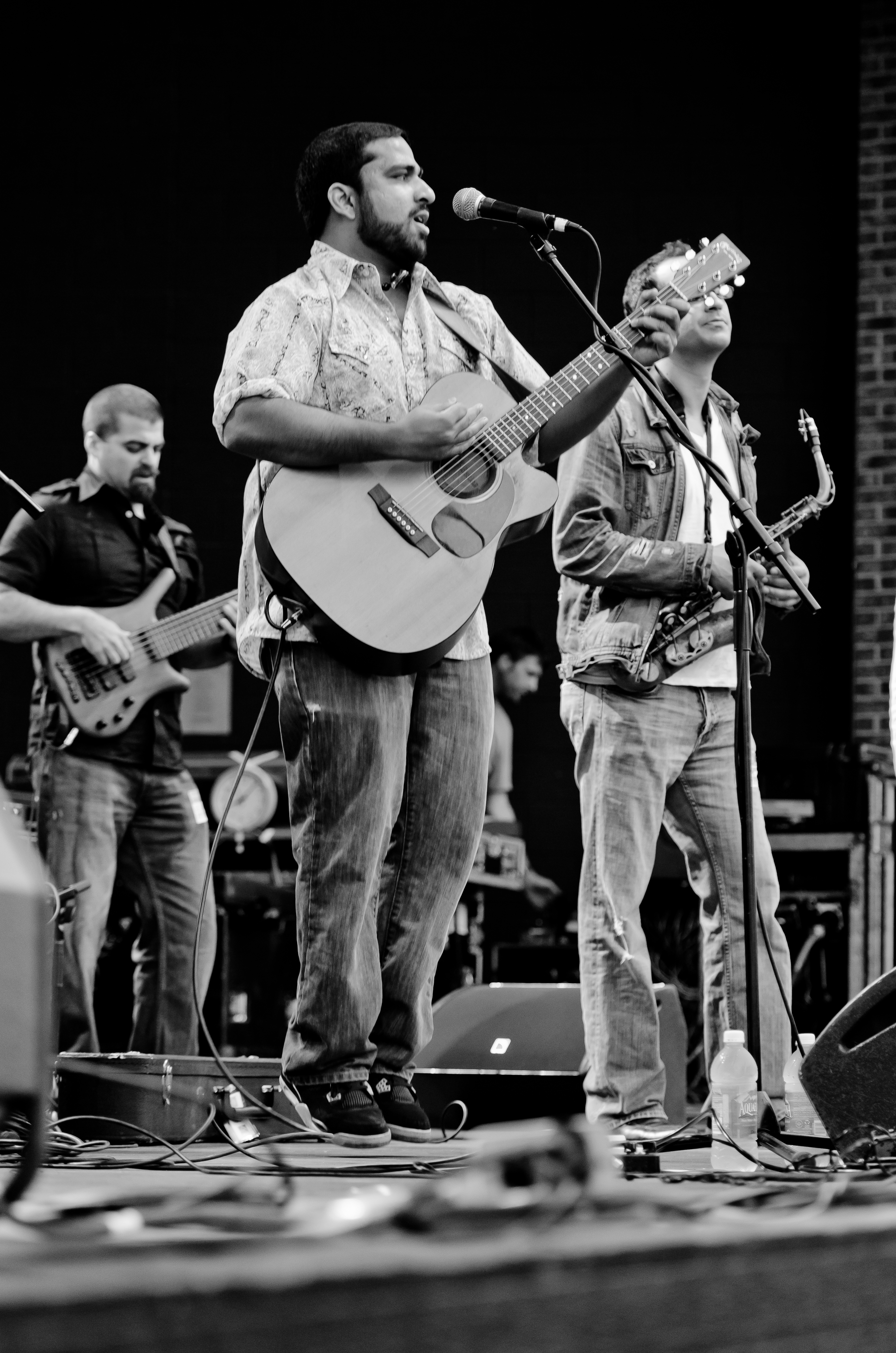
Korula performing with The Nikhil Korula Band in 2011

=== With The Nikhil Korula Band ===
==== Extended plays ====
- 2003: The Freedom EP
- 2007: Acoustic B-Sides & Rarities
- 2013: Solo Sessions EP (with Jeff Coffin and Butch Taylor)

==== Albums ====
- 2004: The Way Things Work
- 2010: Live Vibes (two-disc live album)
- 2012: Music of the New Day
- 2014: A Decade in the Sun

==== Notable singles ====
- 2013: "Fade Away" off Solo Sessions EP – No. 10 on AC Radio Chart

== See also ==
- List of people from Los Angeles
- List of singer-songwriters
- List of University of Southern California people
