= Never Leave Me (disambiguation) =

"Never Leave Me" is an episode of Buffy the Vampire Slayer.

Never Leave Me may also refer to:

- Never Leave Me (film), a Bosnian drama film directed by Aida Begić
- "Never Leave Me", a song by Among the Thirsty from Who You Say I Am
- "Never Leave Me", a song by Avicii from Tim
- "Never Leave Me", a song by Dick Haymes from The Complete Capitol Collection
- "Never Leave Me", a song by Gordon Jenkins from Manhattan Tower, covered by Patti Page
- "Never Leave Me", a song by Marion Raven from Songs from a Blackbird
- "Never Leave Me", a song by Max Roach from Moon Faced and Starry Eyed
- "Never Leave Me", a song by Mr. President from Up'n Away – The Album
- "Never Leave Me", a song by Appietus
- "Never Leave Me", a song by Dena Mwana
- "Never Leave Me", a song by Eddie Peregrina
- Never Leave Me, a book by Dorothy Black
- Never Leave Me, a book by Harold Robbins
- Never Leave Me, a book by John Glatt
- Never Leave Me, a book by Margaret Pemberton
- Sundown International: Never Leave Me, a book by Kate Johnson

== See also ==
- Never Leave
- Never Leave Me Alone
- Never Leave You
