= Solo Sessions =

Solo Sessions may refer to:

- Solo Sessions, a 2013 EP by Nikhil Korula
- Solo Sessions Vol. 1: Live at the Knitting Factory, a 2004 live album by John Legend
- Solo Sessions (Chet Atkins album), 2003
