= The Nikhil Korula Band =

American jam band

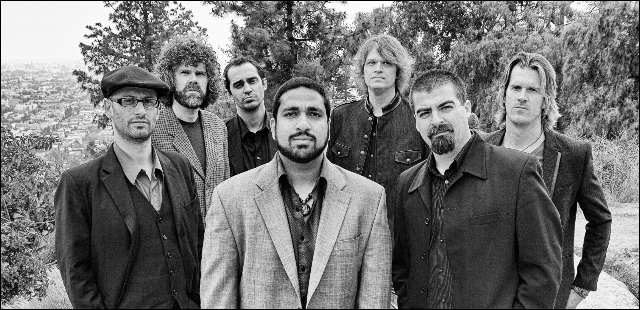
- L-R in 2011: Marcus Milius, Chris Lovejoy, Zane Musa, Nikhil, Adam Gust, Matt Spencer, Ray Bergstrom

Background information
- Also known as: The NK Band
- Origin: Los Angeles, California, United States
- Genres: World music, jazz, blues, adult contemporary
- Years active: 2002–present
- Label: Groove Infinity Records
- Members: Nikhil Korula, Ray Bergstrom, Matt Spencer, Adam Gust, Zane Musa, Marcus Milius, Chris Lovejoy, Will Herrington
- Past members: Anthony King, Leo Nobre, Dan Boissy, Jack Lees,
- Website: Nikhil Korula Band

The Nikhil Korula Band is an American jam band based in California, known for blending genres as diverse as jazz, world music, and adult contemporary. Also called The NK Band, the original lineup has changed somewhat since the band was founded in 2002, and currently consists of Nikhil Korula, Ray Bergstrom, Matt Spencer, Adam Gust, Zane Musa, Marcus Milius, Chris Lovejoy, and Will Herrington. With a sound described by Relix Magazine as "part Dave Matthews guitar licks and sax solos alongside world-music beats," the band has performed at festivals such as Bonnaroo, the Playboy Jazz Festival, SXSW, and Summerfest. They have also headlined venues such as House of Blues and the Viper Room, as well as numerous college campuses, and have opened for Jason Mraz, John Mayer, The Roots, Erykah Badu, and Rusted Root, among others.

Their music has been featured on the soundtracks of TV shows such as Greek, Burn Notice, The Real World, and Guiding Light, and in 2014 the music video for their song "Fade Away" won Best Music Video Film at Indie Fest in Southern California, as well as several other film festivals that include Alaska Film Fest, Studio City Film Festival, and Yosemite Film Festival.

== History ==
=== 2002–04: Founding, The Way Things Work ===
The founding member of the NK Band, Nikhil Korula, first started performing as a solo artist in 2002 around Los Angeles. Largely performing acoustic music with a guitar, early on he collaborated with jazz musicians around the city, teaming up with guitarist Anthony King in 2002 as an acoustic duo at open mics, coffeehouses, and music venues. Saxophonist Dan Boissy and harmonica player Marcus Milius joined in 2002. Once a regular lineup was established the group was founded in 2002, blending calypso, rock, reggae, African and Latin sounds. Their first gig as a sextet was a sold-out show at the Knitting Factory on July 25, 2002.

Their debut release, The Freedom EP, was released in 2003 on Groove Infinity Records. The EP led to the band recording a full-length album at Ocean Way Studios in Hollywood. Titled The Way Things Work, the LP came out in 2004. In response, Relix Magazine wrote that Korula's music mixes "part Dave Matthews guitar licks and sax solos alongside world-music beats...Korula’s new album, The Way Things Work, displays the six-piece’s own western/tribal dichotomy."

=== 2005–12: Touring and live album ===
Touring intermittently, the NK Band performed at the House of Blues in December 2006 with a lineup consisting of Korula, Anthony King, Leo Nobre, Dan Boissy, Adam Gust and Jack Lees. They were described as a buzz band by Kevin Bronson of the Los Angeles Times in 2006, who wrote that "think of the Nikhil Korula Band as the rainbow snow cone of the local rock scene: plenty of flavors, all adding up to something cool and sweet. Afro-beats, Latin grooves, calypso, jazz."

Their EP Acoustic B-Sides & Rarities came out in 2007, and that September they opened for the Dave Matthews Band. They have also performed at festivals such as Summerfest from 2007 to 2014, including opening Summerfest for O.A.R. in June 2007, Bonnaroo in 2008 and 2009, Sunset Junction Street Fair, JazzReggae Festival @ UCLA, and SXSW. Beyond headlining over twenty shows at the House of Blues, they have also headlined venues such as The Mint, The Roxy on the Sunset Strip, Temple Bar, the Viper Room, the Apollo Theater on April 4, 2010, and numerous college campuses. The band headlined at the Playboy Jazz Festival’s Community Concert in June 2011, with co-headliners including drummer Ndugu Chancler and guitarist Doc Powell.

The NK Band's 2010 double album Live Vibes captures their live performances, and includes twenty original songs performed in front of the band's hometown audience. The band's track "Stay For A While" was included on Greek (ABC Family) episode "I Know What You Did Last Semester," which aired January 2010.

=== 2012–13: Music of the New Day and Solo Sessions ===
Released in 2012, the NK Band's studio album Music of the New Day consisted of all original tracks, excluding a Bo Diddly cover of "Before You Accuse Me." As of late 2012 the band was receiving radio airplay on 45 stations in 25 states, as well as in counties such as India, Australia, New Zealand and the United Kingdom. "A Song For L.A." from the album has also been featured at home games for teams such as the Los Angeles Lakers, Los Angeles Clippers, and Los Angeles Kings. The Scoop LA wrote on October 24, 2012, that "A standing room only crowd turned out last night for The Nikhil Korula Band at The House of Blues on the Sunset Strip. In another stellar performance, Korula and his band knocked it out of the park with a 3-hour concert featuring music from their latest album Music of the New Day and classic hits by such iconic artists as Stevie Wonder and Eric Clapton." In early 2013 the band continued to tour, and it was at Summerfest that the band also opened for Gavin DeGraw on June 26, 2013, performing an audience of over 10,000 people. The band also performed at the 2013 Sundance festival as part of the "Concerts at Sundance" music series.

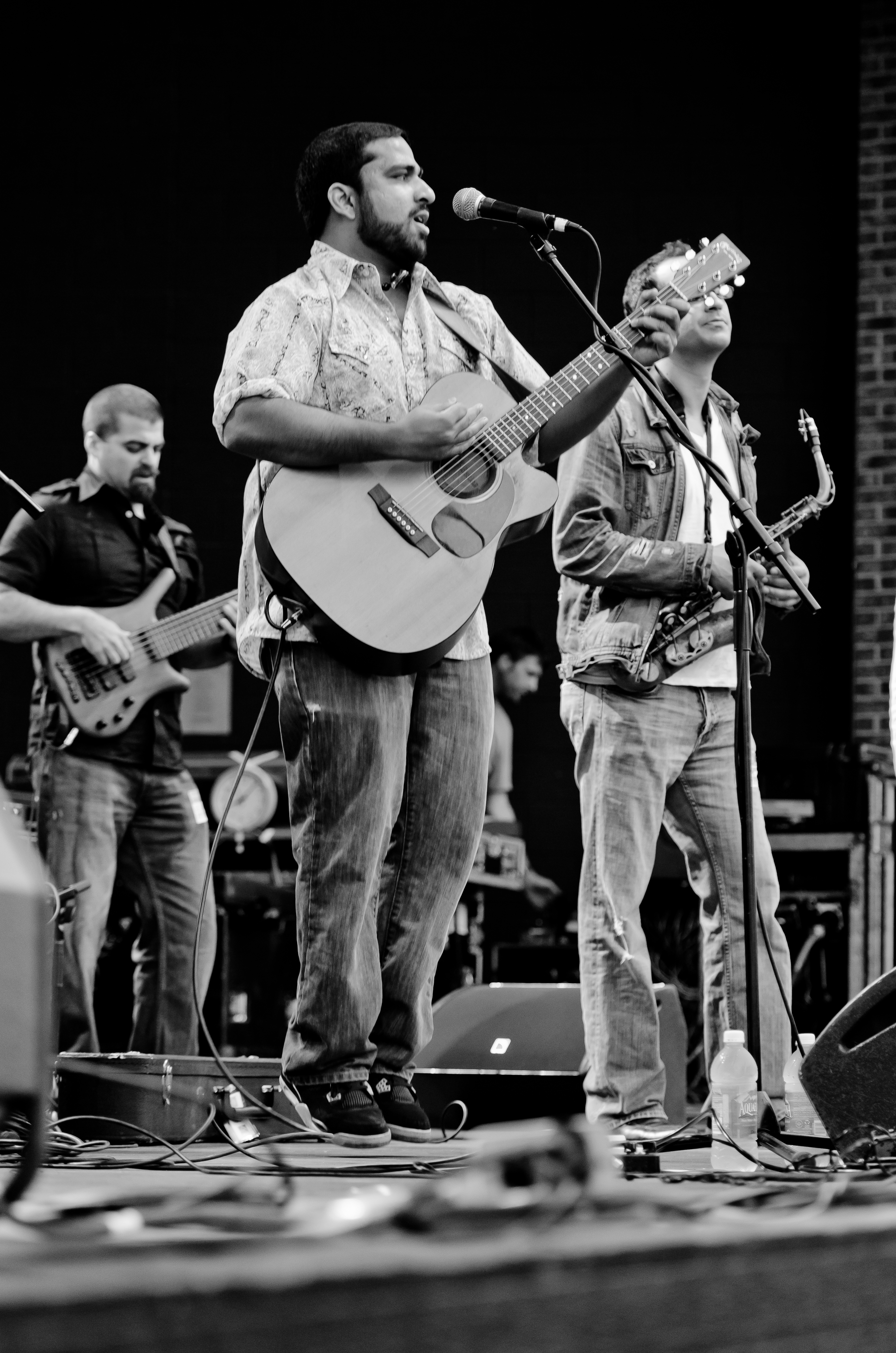
The band performing in 2011

In 2013 Korula recorded Solo Sessions, collaborating with members of the NK Band and two members of the Dave Matthew Band, Jeff Coffin (saxophone) and Butch Taylor (keyboards). All songs on the EP are original. Officially released on July 9, 2013, that day the band also held a release party while headlining the House of Blues Sunset Strip. Stephen K. Peeples of House Blend commented that the EP's "music is soulful and adventurous, drawing from multicultural roots, and translates easily from solo to the full band arrangements fans will [see live]." The lead single from the EP, "Fade Away," was released prior to the EP, and as of July 7, 2013, was inside the To 20 on FMQB's Hot A/C airplay chart, after initially debuting at No. 106. It peaked at No. 10 on the AC Radio Chart (also titled MQB's 'Friday Morning Quarterback Inc.' Hot Adult Contemporary Radio chart).

=== 2014–present ===
Solo Sessions was followed by the full-length studio album A Decade in the Sun, recorded by Korula as an acoustic solo album at Sun Studio in Memphis, Tennessee. The band toured in support of the album. In 2014, the music video for "Fade Away" won Best Music Video Film at Indie Fest in Southern California. The music video, directed by Jethro Rothe-Kushel, was also an official selection for the NYC Independent Film Festival in 2014. As of late 2014, the video had won five film award for best music video, including film festivals such as the Yosemite Film Festival, Alaska Film Festival, and Studio City Film Festival.

== Style ==
The NK Band frequently incorporates improvisation into their live shows. They also incorporates genres as diverse as jazz, adult contemporary, funk, blues, singer-songwriter, and world music.

== Members ==
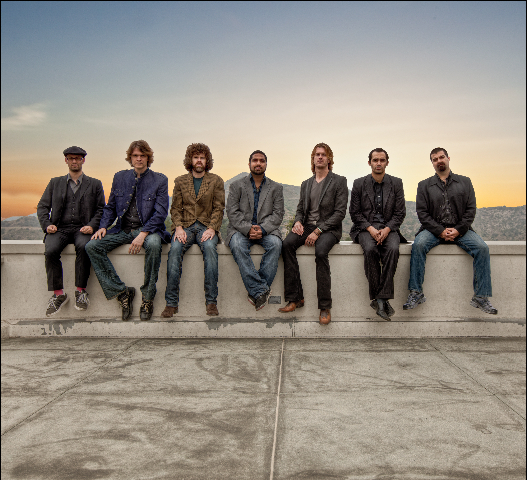
The members of The NK Band in 2011, L-R: Marcus Milius, Adam Gust, Chris Lovejoy, Nikhil Korula, Ray Bergstrom, Zane Musa, Matt Spencer. Along with the 2013 addition of pianist Will Herrington, this lineup was intact as of late 2014.

=== Current ===
- Nikhil Korula (2002–present) – lead vocals, guitar (acoustic, electric)
- Ray Bergstrom (2009–present) – lead electric guitar
- Matt Spencer (2006–present) – bass
- Adam Gust (2005–present) – drums
- Zane Musa (2011–present) – saxophone (alto and soprano)
- Chris Lovejoy (2009–present) – percussion
- Marcus Milius (2002–present) – harmonica
- Will Herrington (2013–present) – piano and keyboards

=== Past ===
- Anthony King (2002–2008) – lead electric guitar
- Dan Boissy (2002–2008) – saxophone
- Jack Lees (2003–2009) – percussion
- Leo Nobre (2004–2008) – bass

== Awards and nominations ==
Selected awards and nominations for the Nikhil Korula Band
| Year | Award | Nominated work | Category | Result |
|---|---|---|---|---|
| 2014 | The Indie Fest | "Fade Away" by Nikhil Korula | Best Music; Video | Won |
| 2014 | LA Cinema Festival of Hollywood | "Fade Away" by Nikhil Korula | Best Music; Video | Won |
| 2014 | Studio City Film Festival | "Fade Away" by Nikhil Korula | Best Music; Video | Won |
| 2014 | Yosemite Film Festival | "Fade Away" by Nikhil Korula | Best Music; Video | Won |
| 2014 | Alaska Film Festival | "Fade Away" by Nikhil Korula | Best Music; Video | Won |

== Discography ==
=== Studio albums ===
Studio albums by the Nikhil Korula Band
| Year | Album title | Release details |
|---|---|---|
| 2004 | The Way Things Work | Released: November 8, 2004; Label: Groove Infinity Records; Format: CD, digital download |
| 2012 | Music of the New Day | Released: January 31, 2012; Label: Groove Infinity Records; Format: CD, digital download |
| 2014 | A Decade in the Sun | Released: 2014; Label: Groove Infinity Records; Format: CD, digital download |

=== Live albums ===
Live albums by the Nikhil Korula Band
| Year | Album title | Release details |
|---|---|---|
| 2010 | Live Vibes (2 disc album) | Released: February 3, 2010; Label: Groove Infinity Records; Format: 2 disc CD, digital download |

=== Extended plays ===
Extended plays by the Nikhil Korula Band
| Year | Album title | Release details |
|---|---|---|
| 2003 | The Freedom EP | Released: May 23, 2003; Label: Groove Infinity Records; Format: Digital |
| 2007 | Acoustic B-Sides & Rarities | Released: April 9, 2007; Label: Groove Infinity Records; Format: Digital |
| 2013 | Solo Sessions (with Jeff Coffin and Butch Taylor) | Released: July 9, 2013; Label: Groove Infinity Records; Format: CD, digital |

=== Singles ===
Selected songs by the Nikhil Korula Band
| Year | Title | Album | Chart peaks | | Release details |
| Year | Title | Album | AC Radio | — | Release details |
|---|---|---|---|---|---|
| 2004 | "Truth" | The Way Things Work | — | — | Featured in Burn Notice |
| 2004 | "Stop The Rain" | The Way Things Work | — | — | Featured in Guiding Light |
| 2007 | "Stay For A While" | Acoustic B-Sides & Rarities | — | — | Featured in Greek S3Ep11 (Jan 2010) |
| 2013 | "Fade Away" (ft. Butch Taylor) | Solo Sessions | 10 | — | Music video (October 29, 2013) |

== See also ==
- Jam bands
