= Ryan Daniel =

American singer (born 1986)

- Born: Ryan Daniel Squitieri; April 23, 1986 (age 40); Clearwater, Florida, U.S.
- Occupations: Recording Artist; Singer, Songwriter
- Years active: 2005–present
- Labels: BEC Recordings; Capitol
- Website: http://AmongTheThirsty.com

Ryan Daniel Squitieri (born April 23, 1986) is an American recording artist, singer, songwriter, and lead singer of the band Among the Thirsty. It was announced on October 31, 2016, that Daniel is now an artist rep for music compilation company Mattrix Mixtape presented by Matthew Rix.

== Music history ==
In 2005, Daniel formed Among The Thirsty, yet their first studio album wasn't released until 2009, Wonder, by Rev Music Group on August 13, 2009. A song from the album, "I'd Need a Savior", charted on various Christian songs charts published by Billboard magazine, from its peak on the Christian Songs at 17, Christian AC Songs at No. 20, Christian AC Indicator at No. 15, and Christian Soft AC at No. 1. Their second album, Who You Say I Am, was released by BEC Recordings on March 17, 2015. This album saw two songs chart on various Christian songs charts that Billboard magazine publishes. The first, "What Love Looks Like", charted on the Christian AC Indicator at a peak of No. 21, only. The second, "Completely", peaked on the following charts; Christian Airplay at No. 13, Christian Songs at No. 17, Christian Digital Songs at No. 18, Christian AC Songs at No. 25, and Christian AC Indicator at No. 15. The album was reviewed by CCM Magazine, Christian Review Magazine, Christian Music Review, and 365 Days of Inspiring Media. They even got the chance to sit down with Jesus Freak Hideout and do an interview to discuss the album, and were profiled by Tony Cummings for Cross Rhythms. Their Christmas song, "This Is Christmas", charted on the Christian Soft AC, at a peak of No. 9.

On November 2, 2016 Daniel sent an email out stating that he was the Artist Rep for Mattrix Mixtape volumes 2, 6 and the Atlanta Compilation. In that same email to his artist he stated that Among the Thirsty had sold over 100,000 copies of their debut radio single "Completely".

== Discography ==
- Wonder (August 13, 2009, Rev Music Group)
- Who You Say I Am (March 17, 2015, BEC Recordings)
