= Everyone Asked About You =

American emo band

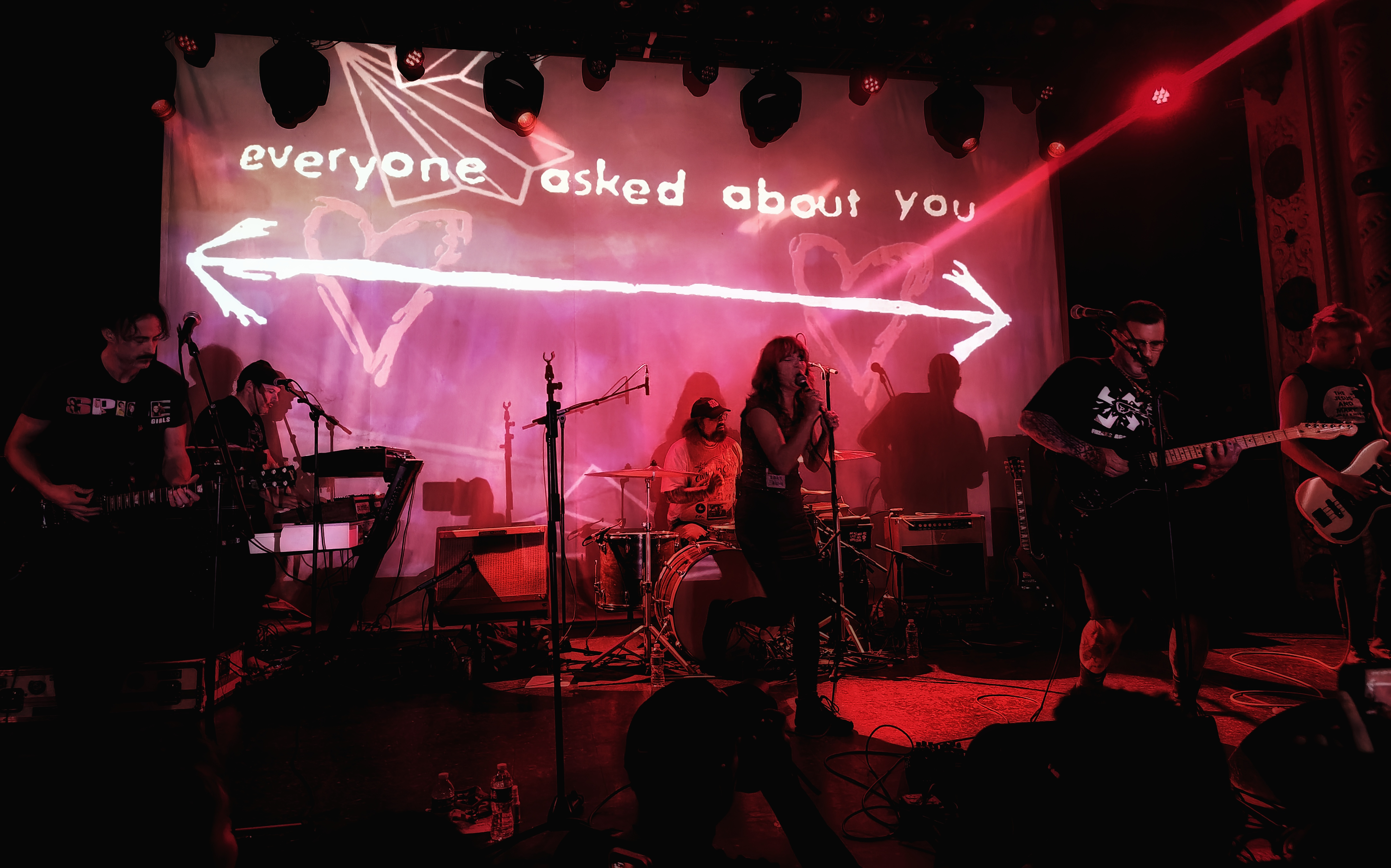
- Everyone Asked About You performing in 2025. Left to right: Collins Kilgore, John Beachboard, Lee Buford, Hannah Vogan, Chris Sheppard, and Matt Bradley

Background information
- Origin: Little Rock, Arkansas, U.S.
- Genres: Emo; indie rock; twee pop
- Years active: 1996–2000; 2022–present
- Labels: Landmark; Amulet; Drawing Room; 25 Diamonds; Numero Group
- Spinoffs: The Body; American Princes
- Members: Hannah Vogan; Chris Sheppard; John Beachboard; Collins Kilgore; Lee Buford; Matt Bradley

Everyone Asked About You is an American emo band from Little Rock, Arkansas. They originally formed in 1996. The name of the band comes from a children's book of the same name by Theodore Faro Gross and Sheila White Samton. The band reunited in 2022 after a reissue of the band's material through The Numero Group, followed by Never Leave, their first new music in 25 years.

== History ==
The band recorded an album (Note: The album, Let's Be Enemies, was recorded in 1998 but was shelved until 2012 when it was released.) and three EPs (one of the EPs being a split with The Shyness Clinic) between 1997 and 1998. They were unknown in their original years and gained attention in later years due to the success of their debut self-titled EP, which had a distinct sound from other emo bands with its blend of indie pop. During their original time together, they went on one tour in the summer of 1999. The final show of their original run was on February 26, 2000 at Clunk Music Hall in Fayetteville, Arkansas with Les Savy Fav. After the group disbanded, Lee Buford, who played drums, formed The Body. John Beachboard and Collins Kilgore formed American Princes.

In 2022, Numero Group announced they would be reissuing the band's discography. The material was released as a double album in 2023 titled Paper Airplanes, Paper Hearts, named after the song from their self-titled EP. The band also started playing shows, starting with a formal hometown reunion show and an appearance at the Numero Twenty festival. On June 3, 2024, the band revealed a new song from the post-reunion sessions titled "We're All Losing It", written during the solar eclipse and recorded the same week. On June 25, a second song, "A Vigil", was announced, along with the formal announcement of the Never Leave EP's release on August 5.

== Discography ==
=== Albums ===
- Let's Be Enemies (2012, 25 Heavens)

=== EPs ===
- Everyone Asked About You (1997, Landmark)
- The Boston to Little Rock Connection Split 7" (split with the Shyness Clinic) (1998, Amulet)
- Sometimes Memory Fails Me Sometimes (1998, Drawing Room)
- Never Leave (2024, Numero Group)

=== Singles ===
- "We're All Losing It" (2024, Numero Group)
- "A Vigil" (2024, Numero Group)

=== Compilations ===
- Paper Airplanes, Paper Hearts (2023, Numero Group)

=== Compilation appearances ===
- "Sometimes Memory Fails Me Sometimes" on Numero Twenty (2023, Numero Group)

== Members ==
- Hannah Vogan – vocals, tambourine
- Chris Sheppard – guitar, vocals, keyboard
- John Beachboard – keyboard
- Collins Kilgore – guitar, keyboard
- Lee Buford – drums
- Matt Bradley – bass
