= Kat Wright =

American singer-songwriter

- Origin: Rochester, New York, U.S.
- Genres: soul · folk · rock · R&B
- Years active: 2010 – present
- Website: www.katwright.com

Kat Wright is an American singer and songwriter based in Burlington, Vermont, U.S.

== Biography ==
Wright was born in Rochester, New York, where she attended Our Lady of Mercy High School and later received a Bachelor of Fine Arts from Alfred University in Alfred, New York. Her first forays into touring began in 2009 with a folk project consisting of Wright and her childhood best-friend Maggie Clifford called Loveful Heights. They released a full-length album recorded by Ryan Power in 2012.

In 2010, having newly relocated to Vermont, Wright formed a group for a Thursday-night residency at the Radio Bean on North Winooski Ave in Burlington, Vermont, a venue Wright co-owns with her husband and Radio Bean founder Lee Anderson. The residency lasted weekly for more than five years before touring elsewhere took precedence.

In the years since, Wright has expanded from shows solely in her adopted hometown of Burlington, Vermont and has toured throughout US. She has primarily toured with both her 8-piece soul band as well as a newly formed acoustic trio with longtime band mates Josh Weinstein (bass) and Bob Wagner (guitar). The acoustic trio made its live debut supporting The Wood Brothers in early 2020 with stops at the newly reopened Webster Hall in New York City, The Fillmore in Philadelphia and the Ryman Auditorium in Nashville, Tennessee.

In 2017, Wright alongside Clifford were featured performers in the Eugene Jarecki music documentary The King.

Wright has supported Kacey Musgraves, Grace Potter, Marco Benevento, Rubblebucket, Lawrence, The Preservation Hall Jazz Band, The Wood Brothers, Leftover Salmon, Ryan Montbleau, Soulive, The Motet, The Original Wailers and Leon Russell.

Notable touring includes an appearance at NPR's Mountain Stage in 2018, two appearances at the Syracuse Jazz Festival as well as appearances at the Montreal International Jazz Festival in 2017, Jam Cruise, Burlington Discover Jazz Fest, Summer Camp Music Festival, Green River Festival, Grace Potter's Grand Point North, and the Brooklyn Bowl. In 2019, she appeared at moe.down in Turin, New York and The Peach Music Festival in Scranton, Pennsylvania.

Wright's debut EP, Introducing... was released in 2013, credited to Kat Wright and the Indomitable Soul Band. As well as soul, it showed jam band and hip-hop influences. The EP was chosen as one of the top 10 best Vermont Made Recordings by Seven Days Newspaper in 2013. In 2014 the readers of the paper voted her Vermont's "Best funk/R&B artist or group" and "Best jazz/blues artist or group". Wright also recorded a live album at Signal Kitchen, Burlington in April 2014.

Wright's first full-length album, By My Side, was produced / recorded by Joel Hamilton (Pretty Lights, Tom Waits, Elvis Costello) at Studio G, Brooklyn and independently released in November 2016.

In April 2019, Wright began production on her second full-length album with producer Eric Krasno. In October, she was invited to be the featured guest vocalist with the Vermont Symphony Orchestra for their fall program.

Wright remains proud of her Vermont heritage and has vocally supported the politics of Bernie Sanders, campaigning as a surrogate with him and performing at his rallies during his 2016 presidential campaign. She supports the environmental movement and uses refillable water bottles during touring. In 2018, she opened a booth called Katnip Vintage at The Vault Collective, a much loved vintage clothing group shop in Burlington, Vermont.

== Discography ==
- Introducing (EP) – 2013
- By My Side – 2016
- Trio Sessions Vol. 1 (EP) - 2021
