= Grand Point North =

Annual music festival in Burlington, Vermont

Coordinates: 44°28′47.1″N 73°13′17.9″W

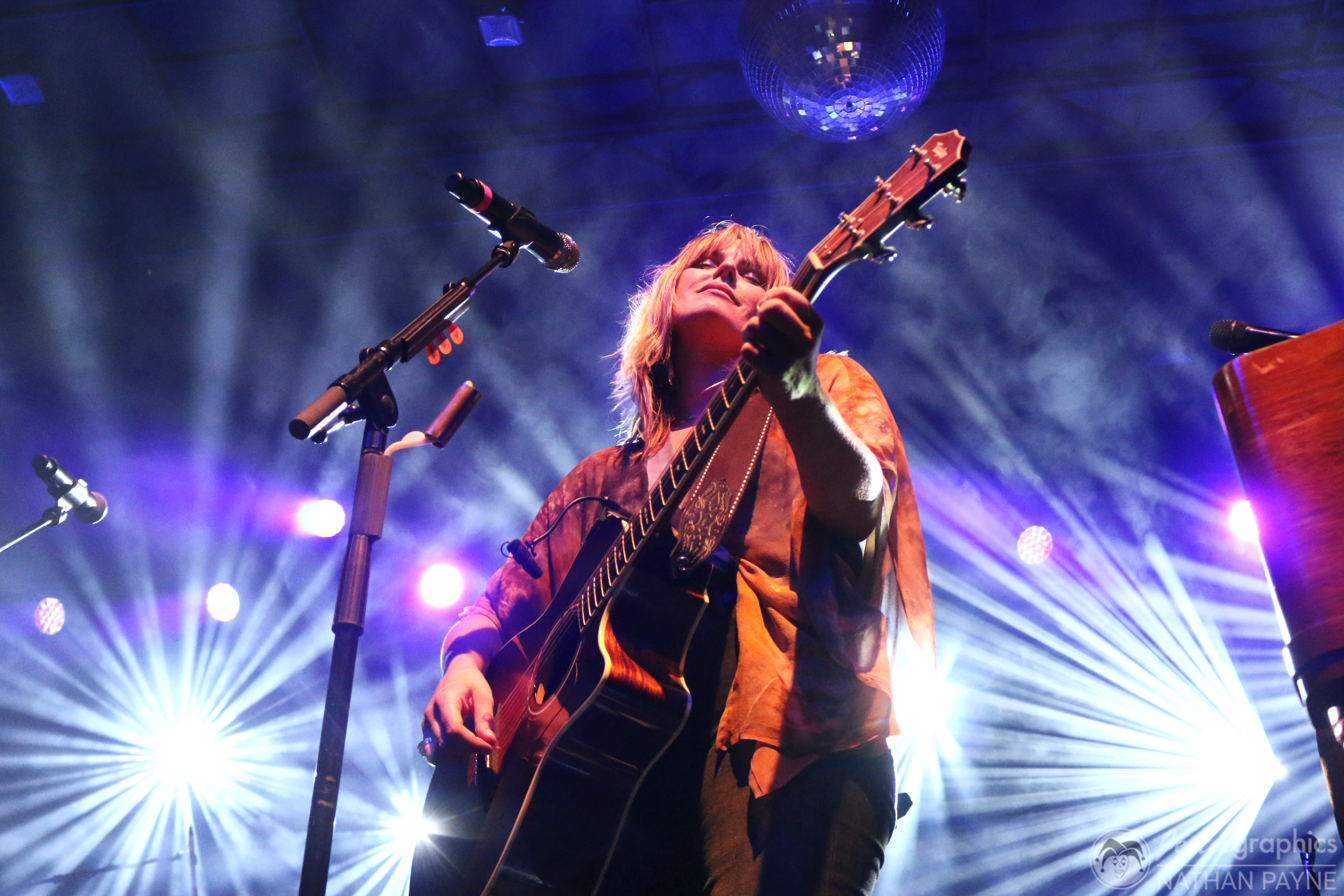
- Grace Potter performing at Grand Point North on September 15, 2018
- Genre: Americana, blues, folk, indie, jam, rock, soul
- Locations: Waterfront Park; 1 Lake Street; Burlington, Vermont
- Years active: 2011-present
- Founders: Grace Potter & The Nocturnals
- Attendance: 9,000 (2016, 2-day total)
- Capacity: 5,000 (per day)
- Organizer: Higher Ground, Grace Potter
- Website: www.grandpointnorth.com

Grand Point North is an annual music festival founded by Grace Potter & The Nocturnals, produced by Grace Potter and Higher Ground Presents, and held at Waterfront Park in Burlington, Vermont. The next festival will be held September 18-20, 2026.

The festival was first held in 2011 and typically is a two-day festival taking place over a weekend in mid-September. The performers alternate on two side-by-side stages, allowing for continuous performances with no overlap. Potter performs both nights, usually as the headliner, and the festival has attracted national artists such as The Avett Brothers, Gov't Mule, Trombone Shorty & Orleans Avenue, Lake Street Dive, The Flaming Lips, Old Crow Medicine Show, Guster, Trey Anastasio Band, Jackson Browne, and Nathaniel Rateliff & The Night Sweats.

There is an emphasis on local acts from Vermont, especially the Burlington area. Since 2013, the festival has partnered with Seven Days to give fans a chance to choose a Vermont musician or band to perform at the festival. The festival features Grand Point Local, a celebration of local Vermont restaurants and food products organized by the Skinny Pancake, and Grand Point Weird, an art installation curated by Grace's sister Charlotte. An official afterparty is often held at a nearby venue after one or both nights; these late-night shows can involve performers from the main festival lineup.

The 2020 and 2021 festivals were both cancelled due to the COVID-19 pandemic. In June 2022, Higher Ground co-founder Alex Crothers stated the festival would not be returning that year, and that the festival's status in future years was uncertain; however, it returned in 2024 as the Grand Point North Concert Series.

== Lineups and schedule ==
=== 2011 ===
The inaugural festival was held in August. Beginning the following year, it would be held in September. Kenny Chesney made a surprise appearance and performed with the Nocturnals.

Saturday, August 13	Sunday, August 14
Grace Potter & The Nocturnals; Fitz and the Tantrums; Jessica Lea Mayfield; Chamberlin; Lendway; Parmaga; Maryse Smith; The Rosesmiths	Grace Potter & The Nocturnals; Taj Mahal Trio; The Wood Brothers; Anais Mitchell & The Hadestown Orchestra; Hoots & Hellmouth; Eames Brothers; Barbacoa; Split Tongue Crow; Fredricks Brown

=== 2012 ===
The lineup for 2012 was announced on May 1. That year's festival was held on Friday and Saturday; every other year it would be held on Saturday and Sunday. Phish keyboardist Page McConnell joined the Nocturnals on Saturday night for a guest appearance.

Friday, September 14	Saturday, September 15
Grace Potter & The Nocturnals; Dr. Dog; Carolina Chocolate Drops; Rich Robinson; Heloise & The Savoir Faire; Ryan Power; Brenda; Tooth Ache	Grace Potter & The Nocturnals; The Avett Brothers; Galactic; Sam Roberts Band; Nicki Bluhm & The Gramblers; Waylon Speed; Gregory Douglass; Bow Thayer; Bob Wagner

=== 2013 ===
The lineup for 2013 was announced on May 14. Kenny Chesney joined the Nocturnals on Saturday night for a surprise guest appearance.

Saturday, September 14	Sunday, September 15
Grace Potter & The Nocturnals; Charles Bradley & His Extraordinaires; The Felice Brothers; Scott Tournet & Ver La Luz; Joshua Panda & The Hot Damned; Alpenglow; Kat Wright & The Indomitable Soul Band; The Dupont Brothers (Note: Seven Days contest winner)	Grace Potter & The Nocturnals; Gov’t Mule; City and Colour; Trombone Shorty & Orleans Avenue; Shovels & Rope; Rough Francis; Natalie Prass; Paper Castles; Belle Pines

=== 2014 ===
The lineup for 2014 was announced on April 22.

Saturday, September 13	Sunday, September 14
Grace Potter & The Nocturnals; Lake Street Dive; The War On Drugs; Lucius; Rayland Baxter; Caroline Rose; Swale; Villanelles; Dwight & Nicole	Grace Potter & The Nocturnals; Trampled By Turtles; The Devil Makes Three; Dr. John & The Nite Trippers; Debo Band; Lowell Thompson; Anders Parker & Cloud Badge; Gold Town; The High Breaks

=== 2015 ===
The lineup for 2015 was announced on April 29. Potter released her solo album Midnight in August and was billed solo for the first time, although her band included Nocturnals members Benny Yurco and Matt Burr. Kenny Chesney again made a surprise appearance on Sunday night.

Saturday, September 12	Sunday, September 13
Grace Potter; Shakey Graves; Mike Gordon; Amy Helm & The Handsome Strangers; Odessa; Madaila; Maryse Smith (Note: Repeat appearance) w/ Michael Chorney; Mal Maiz; Harwood Union High School Assembly Band	Grace Potter; The Flaming Lips; Greensky Bluegrass; Marco Benevento; Spirit Family Reunion; Soule Monde; Heavy Plains; The Snaz; Barishi

=== 2016 ===
The lineup for 2016 was announced on April 14. Basia Bulat was originally scheduled to perform on Sunday but had to cancel the night before; she was replaced by River Whyless, who had performed at the official after party on Saturday. This festival featured free yoga classes for the first time.

Saturday, September 17	Sunday, September 18
Grace Potter; Guster; Kaleo; Blind Pilot; Kat Wright & The Indomitable Soul Band; Smooth Antics; Billy Dean & The Honor Roll; Blue Button; Evansville Transit Authority	Grace Potter; Old Crow Medicine Show; The Wood Brothers; The Record Company; River Whyless (replacement for Basia Bulat); And The Kids; Eliza Hardy Jones; Steady Betty; Iron Eyes Cody

=== 2017 ===
The lineup for 2017 was announced on April 26. The Trey Anastasio Band, performing in Burlington for the first time since 2011, was the headliner on Sunday night. This was the first (and to date only) time that the headliner at Grand Point North was not Grace Potter or her former band, the Nocturnals. Anastasio's set featured many guest appearances by former members of his band and Phish.

Saturday, September 16	Sunday, September 17
Grace Potter; Dawes; Mondo Cozmo; Hurray For The Riff Raff; Tank and the Bangas; Smalltalker; Lake Superior; SnakeFoot; Troy Millette & Dylan Gombas	Trey Anastasio Band; Grace Potter; Joseph; Low Cut Connie; Son Little; Henry Jamison; Barika; The Welterweights; Eastern Mountain Time

=== 2018 ===
The lineup for 2018 was announced on May 23, with Jackson Browne and Ani DiFranco being announced later, on June 25. Greg Holden was originally announced, but was not on the final schedule. Ariel Zevon, Warren Zevon's daughter and Jackson Browne's goddaughter, performed with Browne during his set. Sen. Bernie Sanders introduced Potter on Saturday, and Kenny Chesney made another guest appearance to perform with Potter.

Saturday, September 15	Sunday, September 16
Grace Potter; Jackson Browne; Ani DiFranco; Mt. Joy; Darlingside; Clever Girls; West End Blend; Miku Daza; Nina's Brew	Grace Potter; Nathaniel Rateliff & The Night Sweats; The Magpie Salute; Caroline Rose; Sister Sparrow & The Dirty Birds; Seth Yacovone Band; Harsh Armadillo; JUPTR; Julia Caesar

=== 2019 ===
The lineup for 2019 was announced on June 13. On July 15, Gov't Mule was announced, along with a special set from Potter and Warren Haynes.

Saturday, September 14	Sunday, September 15
Grace Potter; Trombone Shorty & Orleans Avenue; J.S. Ondara; Lucy Dacus; Bailen; Francesca Blanchard; Matthew Mercury; J Bengoy; Ben Fuller	Grace Potter; Special Acoustic Set With Grace Potter & Warren Haynes; Rainbow Kitten Surprise; Gov't Mule; Lucius; Michael Nau; Lady Moon & The Eclipse; The Bubs; Sabouyouma; Princess Nostalgia

=== 2024 ===
On February 27, Potter announced the festival would return as a four-day event in July called the Grand Point North Concert Series. Thursday would be headlined by a mystery performer, later announced as The Head and the Heart, and Friday would be headlined by The Flaming Lips. Saturday and Sunday would proceed as in previous years, with Potter headlining both nights, although it would only feature one stage instead of two, reducing the number of performances each day. The rest of the lineups were announced on May 13.

Saturday, July 27	Sunday, July 28
Grace Potter; Michael Marcagi; Henry Jamison; Sarah King; The Bubs; Copilot	Grace Potter; Anderson East; Ali McGuirk; Acqua Mossa; All Night Boogie Band; Marcie Hernandez

=== 2025 ===
The 2025 festival was announced on June 16. It would be returning to its typical weekend in mid-September, although the two nights headlined by Potter would be held on Friday and Saturday, with Sunday night being headlined by jam band Goose. The full lineups for Friday and Saturday were announced at the same time.

Friday, September 12	Saturday, September 13
Grace Potter with the Vermont Symphony Orchestra; Maryse Smith; The Wet Ones!; Burly Girlies; Grace Palmer	Grace Potter; Ista; Slob Drop; Heady Betty; Dutch Experts

=== 2026 ===
The 2026 lineup was announced on May 13. The two nights headlined by Potter are Friday and Saturday, with Sunday night featuring Dark Star Orchestra. Lawson's Finest Liquids was announced as a co-presenter.

Friday, September 18	Saturday, September 19
Grace Potter; Portugal. The Man; The Devil Makes Three; All the Rivers; Jesse Taylor Band	Grace Potter; Jackson Brown; Dawes; Trampled By Turtles; Maggie Rose; Frankie White; Rose Asteroid
