= Among the Thirsty =

American Christian music and worship band

- Also known as: ATT
- Origin: Clearwater, Florida
- Genres: Contemporary Christian music, contemporary worship music, pop rock
- Years active: 2005–present
- Labels: BEC, Rev
- Members: Ryan Daniel: Brian Scott Henderson; Alan Pelno
- Past members: Brock Douglas
- Website: amongthethirsty.com

Among the Thirsty is an American contemporary Christian music and worship band based out of Clearwater, Florida. Formed in 2005, their members include lead vocalist and acoustic guitarist, Ryan Daniel, guitarist and background vocalist, Brian Scott Henderson and pianist, Alan Pelno. They released, Wonder, with Rev Music Group in 2008, and their song, "I'd Need a Savior", appeared on various Christian Song charts published by Billboard magazine. Their second album, Who You Say I Am, was released by BEC Recordings in 2015, this album saw two songs, "What Love Looks Like" and "Completely", appear on various Christian Song charts.

== Background ==
The contemporary Christian music and worship band formed in Clearwater, Florida, in 2007. They count as their members; lead vocalist and acoustic guitarist, Ryan Daniel, guitarist and background vocalist, Brian Scott Henderson, bass guitarist and background vocalist, Brock Douglas & pianist, Alan Pelno.

== Music history ==
The group formed in 2005, yet their first studio album wasn't released until 2009, Wonder, by Rev Music Group on August 13, 2009. A song from the album, "I'd Need a Savior", charted on various Christian songs charts published by Billboard magazine, from its peak on the Christian Songs at 17, Christian AC Songs at No. 20, Christian AC Indicator at No. 15, and Christian Soft AC at No. 8. Their second album, Who You Say I Am, was released by BEC Recordings on March 17, 2015. This album saw two songs chart on various Christian songs charts that Billboard magazine publishes. The first, "What Love Looks Like", charted on the Christian AC Indicator at a peak of No. 21, only. The second, "Completely", peaked on the following charts; Christian Airplay at No. 13, Christian Songs at No. 17, Christian Digital Songs at No. 18, Christian AC Songs at No. 25, and Christian AC Indicator at No. 15. The album was reviewed by CCM Magazine, Christian Review Magazine, Christian Music Review, and 365 Days of Inspiring Media. They even got the chance to sit down with Jesus Freak Hideout and do an interview to discuss the album, and were profiled by Tony Cummings for Cross Rhythms. Their Christmas song, "This Is Christmas", charted on the Christian Soft AC, at a peak of No. 9.

== Members ==
- Ryan Daniel – acoustic guitar, lead vocals
- Brock Douglas – bass guitar, background vocals
- Brian Scott Henderson – guitar, background vocals
- Alan Pelno - Keys, background vocals

== Discography ==
- Wonder (August 13, 2009, Rev Music Group)
- Who You Say I Am (March 17, 2015, BEC Recordings)
