= Never Leave =

Never Leave may refer to:

- Never Leave (EP), a 2024 EP by Everyone Asked About You
- "Never Leave" (song), a 2022 song by Bailey Zimmerman

== See also ==
- Never Leave Me
- Never Leave You
