= Never Leave (EP) =

EP by Everyone Asked About You
- Released: August 5, 2024
- Studio: Fellowship Hall Sound (Little Rock, Arkansas)
- Length: 12:54
- Label: The Numero Group

Everyone Asked About You chronology
Paper Airplanes, Paper Hearts (2023)	Never Leave (2024)

Singles from Never Leave
- 1. "We're All Losing It" Released: June 2, 2024

Never Leave is the fourth EP by American emo band Everyone Asked About You. It was released on August 5, 2024 by the Numero Group and is the group's first new music in 25 years.

== Background and recording ==
Everyone Asked About You formed in 1996 in Little Rock, Arkansas, and after releasing a handful of singles and recording an album in 1998 that went unreleased, they split up in 2000. The album, Let's Be Enemies, was eventually released by the record label 25 Diamonds, both digitally and for a run of 300 vinyl records. That version of the album was removed from digital platforms in 2022 and replaced with a remastered version released in May 2023 by the Numero Group. Simultaneously, the band reunited for concerts in Little Rock in December 2022 and Numero's 20th anniversary concert in Los Angeles in February 2023. Numero released a compilation album of the band's discography, Paper Airplanes, Paper Hearts, in July 2023.

Never Leave was recorded by Jason Weinheimer of Little Rock recording studio Fellowship Hall Sound and mixed by North Carolina producer Alex Farrar.

== Release ==
The EP was preceded by lead single "We're All Losing It", released on June 2. It is the band's first new song in 25 years. The song is in the band's "sweet spot" sound, with dual indie pop vocals from singer Hannah Vogan and singer/guitarist Chris Sheppard over emo music. The song was inspired by male pattern baldness, and was written during an eclipse.

Stereogum listed the song as one of the five best of the week, with Abby Jones writing "losing it has rarely sounded so gratifying."

The EP was announced on June 25, with release set for August 5, 2024, by the Numero Group. Numero shared a snippet of the song "A Vigil" the same day, and the full song premiered on the band's YouTube page the following day. With the announcement, Sheppard shared a video of him playing "A Vigil" on an acoustic guitar, and posted a statement about the need for LGBT pride in which he said the song was "about the basic truth–we're not going anywhere. We are the roots breaking through the concrete. I wrote it in a flurry of a couple hours after learning of the death of Nex Benedict and I was thrust back into memories from my teenage years of Brandon Teena, Matthew Shepard, and countless other stories of attacks on queer people. I wondered what would happen if we started telling the truth... if the people we are supposed to trust stopped twisting the things where we are supposed to find compassion and solace into weapons used against us."

Numero Group announced on the day of release that the EP would be issued on 7" vinyl (both pink-colored and standard black) in October, along as in a bundle with a reissue of "Sometimes Memory Fails Me Sometimes", a single released by the band in 1998 that became popular on TikTok in 2023.

== Live ==
The band performed at Best Friends Forever, an emo-centric music festival held at the Downtown Las Vegas Events Center, on October 11. Following that, the band played shows in Los Angeles, San Francisco, Portland, and Seattle, on October 15–19. For the San Francisco show, the band were joined by Awakebutstillinbed.

== Track listing ==
All tracks are written by Everyone Asked About You.

No.	Title	Length
1.	"A-House"	3:10
2.	"We're All Losing It"	3:04
3.	"Toby"	2:26
4.	"A Vigil"	4:13
Total length:		12:54

== Personnel ==
- Jason Weinheimer – recording engineer (Fellowship Hall Sound)
- Alex Farrar – mixing engineer
