= 2009 Bonnaroo Music Festival =

The 2009 Bonnaroo Music and Arts Festival was held from June 11 to 14, 2009 at a 700-acre (2.8 km^{2}) farm in Manchester, Tennessee. There were roughly 75,000 people in attendance. The onset of Bonnaroo 2009 was punctuated by monstrous thunderstorms. Thursday night included heavy rain, lightning, strong winds and hail. A lighter storm passed over the farm on Friday. The resulting mud became a hardship for some and a plaything for others.

== Lineup ==
The initial lineup was released on the festival's website at midnight on February 3, 2009. Phish performed a traditional two-set headlining spot on Sunday night as well as a late night set on Friday night. Bruce Springsteen and the E Street Band performed Saturday.

The previously annual Superjam did not take place, and for the first time in Bonnaroo's eight-year history, not a single member of the Grateful Dead performed at the festival.

=== June 11th ===
(artists listed from earliest to latest set times)

- This Tent:
  - Erick Baker
  - White Rabbits
  - Hockey
  - Chairlift
  - Passion Pit
  - Delta Spirit
- That Tent:
  - Charlie Allen
  - Alberta Cross
  - Portugal. The Man
  - The Low Anthem
  - Zac Brown Band
- The Other Tent:
  - Janelle Monáe
  - Murs
  - The Knux
  - People Under The Stairs
  - Midnite
- Comedy Sweet Humored by Butterfinger:
  - Comedy Carnivale: Christian Finnegan, Arj Barker, Janeane Garofalo, Nick Thune & Pete Holmes (3 Sets)
  - Bonnapoo 2009 Starring Triumph the Insult Comic Dog
- Cinema Tent:
  - Chuck Norris Rules: Missing in Action
  - Kids Play
  - Primus: Blame It on the Fish
  - The Present
  - Green Screens presented by Rock the Earth: Mountaintop Removal Q&A: Ben Sollee/Maria Gumoe
  - 2009 NBA Finals Game Four
  - Teen Wolf
  - House Party
  - Chuck Norris Rules: Lone Wolf McQuade
  - The Simpsons Movie
- Arcade Discothèque Powered by Xbox 360:
  - Tobacco
  - DJ Quickie Mart
  - Gypsyphonic Disko (DJ Set by Ben Ellman of Galactic)
  - Kraak & Smaak
- Troo Music Lounge Hosted by Budweiser:
  - Jedd Hughes
  - Roger Alan Wade
  - Julia Nunes
  - The Black Lillies
  - Erin McCarley
  - Those Darlins
  - Tanglers Blues Band
  - American Princes
  - Tobacco
- Solar Stage:
  - Hunub Kru Breakdancing
  - Poetix
  - Bonnaroo Buskers
  - Now The River: Eco-Folk Music
  - African Drum and Dance By Mawre Company
  - Gypsy Hands Tribal Dance
  - Bonnaroo Buskers
  - Yoga Out of Bounds
  - Hunab Kru Breakdancing
  - Stephen Smartt & Brian Pierce
  - Poetix
  - Ogya
  - Bonnaroo Buskers
  - Hunub Kru Breakdancing
  - Gypsy Hands Tribal Dance
- Silent Disco Powered by Vitaminwater Sync:
  - J. Boogie (including Latin Funk Dance Hour)
  - Aaron LaCrate
  - The Hood Internet
  - Motion Potion

=== June 12th ===
(artists listed from earliest to latest set times)

- What Stage:
  - The Itals
  - Galactic with Trombone Shorty and Corey Henry
  - Al Green
  - Beastie Boys
  - Phish
- Which Stage:
  - Gomez
  - Animal Collective
  - Yeah Yeah Yeahs
  - TV on the Radio
  - David Byrne
- This Tent:
  - Tift Merritt
  - Kaki King
  - Grace Potter and the Nocturnals
  - Grizzly Bear
  - Lucinda Williams
  - Public Enemy
  - Paul Oakenfold
- That Tent:
  - Katzenjammer
  - Dirty Projectors
  - St. Vincent
  - Santigold
  - Ani DiFranco
  - Phoenix
  - Crystal Castles
  - Girl Talk
- The Other Tent:
  - Toubab Krewe
  - Vieux Farka Touré
  - Béla Fleck & Toumani Diabaté
  - King Sunny Adé & the African Beats
  - Amadou & Mariam
  - Femi Kuti and the Positive Force
  - Pretty Lights
- Sonic Stage:
  - Portugal. The Man
  - Alberta Cross
  - The Low Anthem
  - Patterson Hood & The Screwtopians
  - moe.
  - Kaki King
  - Galactic (Interview Only)
  - Béla Fleck & Toumani Diabaté
  - Toubab Krewe
- Comedy Sweet Humored by Butterfinger:
  - Comedy Carnivale: Christian Finnegan, Arj Barker, Janeane Garofalo, Nick Thune & Pete Holmes (3 Sets)
  - Bonnapoo 2009 Starring Triumph the Insult Comic Dog (2 Sets)
- Cafe Where Hosted by AT&T:
  - The Belleville Outfit
  - Ben Sollee
  - Mt. St. Helens Vietnam Band
- Cinema Tent:
  - Cold Souls
  - Q&A: Don Hertzfeldt
  - Green Screens presented by Rock the Earth: Flow Q&A: Gill Holland/Intro: Adam Yauch
  - Anvil! The Story of Anvil
  - Happiness Is
  - Chuck Norris Rules: Missing in Action
  - Tropic Thunder
  - The Dark Knight
- Arcade Discothèque Powered by Xbox 360:
  - The Hood Internet
  - Aaron LaCrate
- Troo Music Lounge Hosted by Budweiser:
  - Moonalice
  - Everest
  - Evan Watson
  - Dirty Sweet
  - The Features
  - Jets Overhead
  - Justin Townes Earle
  - The Protomen
  - Ki Theory
- Solar Stage:
  - Gypsy Hands Tribal Dance
  - Rock The Earth Panel Discussion: "Social Change Through Music"
  - Poetix
  - African Drum and Dance by Mawre Company
  - Rock The Earth Interview and Performance
  - Bonnaroo Buskers
  - Justin Townes Earle
  - Poetix
  - Cotton Jones
  - African Drum and Dance by Mawre Company
  - Bonnaroo Buskers
  - Hunab Kru Breakdancing
  - Gypsy Hands Tribal Dance
- Silent Disco Powered by Vitaminwater Sync:
  - Motion Potion (including 70's Funk Hour)
  - J. Boogie's 80's Dance Party
  - Gypsyphonic Disko
  - Kraak & Smaak

=== June 13th ===
(artists listed from earliest to latest set times)

- What Stage:
  - Wailing Souls
  - Rodrigo y Gabriela
  - Wilco
  - Bruce Springsteen and the E Street Band
- Which Stage:
  - Ilo & the Coral Reefer All Stars featuring Jimmy Buffett
  - Heartless Bastards
  - Booker T & The DBT's
  - Gov't Mule
  - The Mars Volta
  - Nine Inch Nails
- This Tent:
  - Elvis Perkins in Dearland
  - Robyn Hitchcock & The Venus 3
  - Bon Iver
  - of Montreal
  - The Decemberists
  - moe.
- That Tent:
  - Alejandro Escovedo
  - Allen Toussaint
  - Raphael Saadiq
  - Jenny Lewis
  - Elvis Costello Solo
  - Yeasayer
  - MGMT
- The Other Tent:
  - The SteelDrivers
  - Cherryholmes
  - Tony Rice Unit
  - The Del McCoury Band
  - David Grisman Quintet
  - Ben Harper and Relentless7
- Sonic Stage:
  - Chairlift
  - Katzenjammer
  - Grace Potter and the Nocturnals
  - Brett Dennen
  - Heartless Bastards
  - Allen Toussaint
  - Cherryholmes
  - Raphael Saadiq
  - Tony Rice Unit
  - Travelin' McCourys
- Comedy Sweet Humored by Butterfinger:
  - Bonnapoo 2009 Starring Triumph the Insult Comic Dog
  - Daily Show Stars: John Oliver, Rob Riggle, Rory Albanese, Wyatt Cenac, Kristen Schaal, Kurt Braunohler
  - Jimmy Fallon with Wayne Federman (2 Sets)
  - Daily Show Stars
- Cafe Where Hosted by AT&T:
  - William Elliott Whitmore
  - Zee Avi
  - Cotton Jones
- Cinema Tent:
  - Beautiful Losers
  - Lebowski Fest - Movie Party
  - Green Screens presented by Rock the Earth: Grand Canyon Adventure
  - Q&A: Don Hertzfeldt
  - Polanskied:
    - Chinatown
    - Rosemary's Baby
    - The Tenant
  - Cold Souls
- Arcade Discothèque Powered by Xbox 360:
  - Kraak & Smaak
  - Aaron LaCrate
- Troo Music Lounge Hosted by Budweiser:
  - Turbine
  - Fiction Family
  - Joe Pug
  - Dan Dyer
  - BrakesBrakesBrakes
  - Jerry Hannan
  - Russian Circles
  - The Giraffes
  - Kuroma
- Solar Stage:
  - African Drum and Dance by Mawre Company
  - Rock The Earth Panel Discussion: "Social Change Through Music"
  - Poetix
  - Rock The Earth Interview and Performance
  - Rock The Earth Interview and Performance: Ben Sollee
  - Bonnaroo Buskers
  - Gypsy Hands Tribal Dance
  - Julia Nunes
  - Poetix
  - The Black Lillies
  - Bonnaroo Buskers
  - African Drum and Dance by Mawre Company
  - Poetix
  - Hunab Kru Breakdancing
  - Gypsy Hands Tribal Dance
- Silent Disco Powered by Vitaminwater Sync:
  - DJ Quickie Mart (featuring Old School Hip Hop Hour)
  - The Hood Internet
  - J. Boogie (featuring 80's Dance Party)

=== June 14th ===
(artists listed from earliest to latest set times)

- What Stage:
  - The 6th Ward Treme Allstars Brass Band
  - Erykah Badu
  - Snoop Dogg
  - Phish
- Which Stage:
  - Mike Farris and the Roseland Rhythm Revue
  - Citizen Cope
  - Andrew Bird
  - Band of Horses
- This Tent:
  - The Lovell Sisters
  - Todd Snider
  - Robert Earl Keen
  - Merle Haggard
  - Neko Case
- That Tent:
  - Cage the Elephant
  - The Dillinger Escape Plan
  - High on Fire
  - Shadows Fall
  - Coheed & Cambria
- The Other Tent:
  - A.A. Bondy
  - Ted Leo and the Pharmacists
  - Brett Dennen
  - Okkervil River
- Sonic Stage:
  - Ben Sollee
  - American Princes
  - Erin McCarley
  - Elvis Perkins
  - Julia Nunes
  - The Lovell Sisters
  - Ted Leo
  - A.A. Bondy
  - Mike Farris
  - The Nikhil Korula Band
- Comedy Sweet Humored by Butterfinger:
  - Daily Show Stars: John Oliver, Rob Riggle, Rory Albanese, Wyatt Cenac, Kristen Schaal, Kurt Braunohler (2 Sets)
  - Michael & Michael Have Issues (2 Sets)
- Cafe Where Hosted by AT&T:
  - Jessica Lea Mayfield
  - Outernational
  - The Heavy Pets
- Cinema Tent:
  - Green Screens presented by Rock the Earth: Earth Days Q&A: Robert Stone
  - Lewbowski Fest - Movie Party
  - Kids Play
  - 2009 NBA Finals Game Five
- Troo Music Lounge Hosted by Budweiser:
  - Sons of Bill
  - Mynameisjohnmichael
  - The Nikhil Korula Band
  - Madi Diaz
  - Dear and the Headlights
  - Dirty Guv'nahs
  - Vertigo
- Solar Stage:
  - Gypsy Hands Tribal Dance
  - Rock The Earth Panel Discussion: "Social Change Through Music"
  - Poetix
  - Rock The Earth Interview and Performance: Grace Potter and the Nocturnals
  - Rock The Earth Interview and Performance
  - Rock The Earth Interview and Performance: Brett Dennen
  - Hunab Kru Breakdancing
  - Gypsy Hands Tribal Dance
  - Bonnaroo Buskers
- Silent Disco Powered by Vitaminwater Sync:
  - Motion Potion
  - DJ Quickie Mart (featuring 80's Hip Hop/Soul Mashup Hour)
