= Everyone Asked About You (EP) =

EP by Everyone Asked About You
- Released: 1997
- Recorded: 1996
- Studio: Poynter Studios (Little Rock)
- Genres: Midwest emo; Emo pop; twee pop; post-punk
- Length: 10:58
- Label: Landmark

Everyone Asked About You chronology
Everyone Asked About You (1997)	The Boston To Little Rock Connection Split 7" (1998)

Everyone Asked About You is the self-titled debut extended play by the American emo band Everyone Asked About You. It was released in 1997 through Landmark Records. The EP is an emo release, consisting of four tracks with a mixture of twee pop vocals by Hannah Vogan and Chris Sheppard.

After the release, the band would release two more extended plays, one being a split EP, before disbanding. All four tracks would be reissued on the compilation album Paper Airplanes, Paper Hearts by the Numero Group, which takes the album's name from one of the tracks.

== Background ==
Everyone Asked About You was formed in 1996 in Little Rock, Arkansas. The band had started informally as a trio with Lee Buford, Chris Sheppard, and Collins Kilgore. The trio began experimenting with original songs and covers such as the Cars' "Just What I Needed", but needed a vocalist due to the complexity of the songs. Buford asked Hannah Vogan to join the band, primarily because she had been taking opera lessons, and she accepted. Buford also chose the band's name Everyone Asked About You, based on the children book of the same name.

== Recording and release ==
The band recorded the EP at Barry Poynter's garage studio, Poynter Studios. A six-song set was recorded consisting of their namesake song, "Paper Airplanes, Paper Hearts", "Me Vs. You", "It's Days Like This That Make Me Wish Summer Lasted Forever", "I Will Wait", and "A Better Way to a Broken Heart." The last two songs were not included in their self-titled EP and were later included in another split EP. All the songs were recorded in one day with minimal takes. The band pressed 500 copies of the album on 7-inch vinyl and hand-created the record sleeves.

== Reception ==
Professional ratings
Review scores
Source	Rating
Sputnikmusic	3.5/5 stars

Everyone Asked About You's EP initially did not see any mainstream recognition, with it only being predominantly within local circles which was a characteristic shared by numerous punk bands at the time. Ebullition Records' magazine HeartattaCk reported on the EP originally on their 18th issue and reviewed it dismissively. Reviewer Dylan Ostendorf wrote that it was too "cutesy" and their lyrics and usage of a Moog synthesizer made him "queasy". He later said that the band depended on basic rock rhythms, but the band had similarities with Rainer Maria and some parts of the EP were decent. Despite the negative reviews, many band members said that they did not care about it, with Vogan saying she just wanted to have fun. The band later disbanded and the EP fell into obscurity.

Later reviews of the EP would be more positive. Maximum Rocknroll in 2000 called the EP "smooth and pleasing" with their emo pop style in a passing mention on a column. Former Sputnikmusic staff Trebor gave the album 3.5 out of 5, stating "there is a lot to be desired" but a "lovely little gem of an EP in an almost endless catalogue of unknown 90's emo albums".

The EP was notably out of print for a long time. John Beachboard, who would become a future band member after this release, was surprised to learn that the original EP was selling for $100 on the site Discogs when he tried to sell his copy for $10. The EP was officially reissued digitally by Numero Group and later on the compilation album Paper Airplanes, Paper Hearts, named after the namesake song from the EP.

== Track listing ==
All music by Everyone Asked About You.

Side one
No.	Title	Length
1.	"Paper Airplanes, Paper Hearts"	2:57
2.	"Me Vs. You"	2:25

Side two
No.	Title	Length
1.	"It's Days Like This That Make Me Wish the Summer Would Last Forever"	2:52
2.	"Everyone Asked About You"	2:43

== Personnel ==
Personnel per insert.

Everyone Asked About You

- Lee Buford – drums
- Collins Kilgore – guitar, keyboards
- Hannah Vogan – vocals
- Chris Sheppard – vocals, guitar, keyboards
