= River Whyless =

American folk band

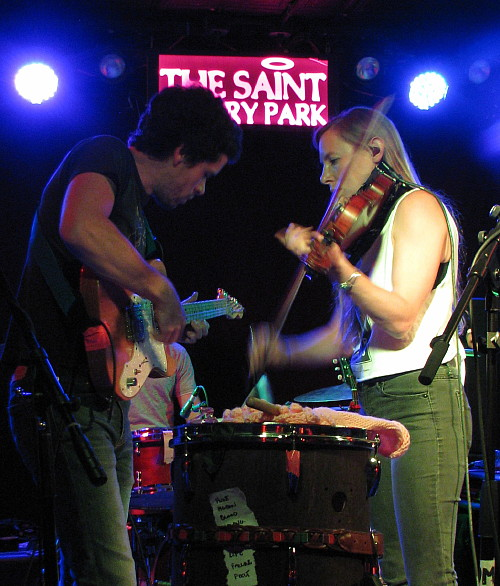
- River Whyless performing in 2017

Background information
- Origin: Asheville
- Genre: Folk rock
- Years active: 2012–present
- Members: Ryan O'Keefe; Halli Anderson; Daniel Shearin; Alex McWalters
- Website: riverwhyless.com

River Whyless is an American folk rock band from Asheville, North Carolina.

== History ==
Daniel Shearin, Ryan O'Keefe, Halli Anderson, and Alex McWalters met as students at Appalachian State University. McWalters said that they considered moving to Austin, Nashville, New York, or Los Angeles, but eventually chose Asheville, North Carolina. O'Keefe, Anderson, and McWalters were already performing in a band when Shearin joined them in 2012.

River Whyless released their first full-length album, titled A Stone, a Leaf, an Unfound Door, in 2012. They followed that by releasing a self-titled EP in 2015. In 2016, the band released their second full-length album, titled We All the Light, via Roll Call Records.

River Whyless released their third studio album, Kindness, a Rebel, in 2018.

They released their fourth album, Monoflora, in 2022.

== Band members ==
- Ryan O'Keefe – vocals, guitar
- Halli Anderson – vocals, violin
- Daniel Shearin – vocals, bass, harmonium
- Alex McWalters – drums

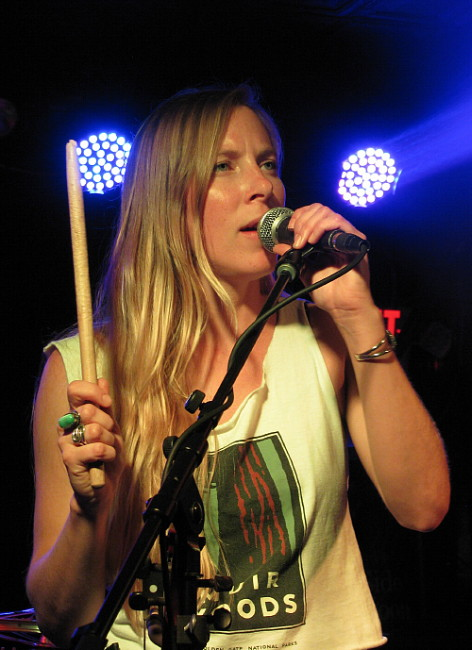
Halli Anderson, June 2017

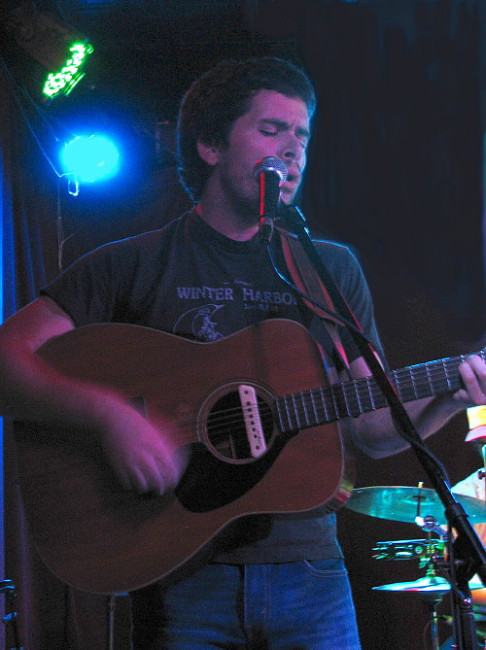
Ryan O'Keefe, June 2017

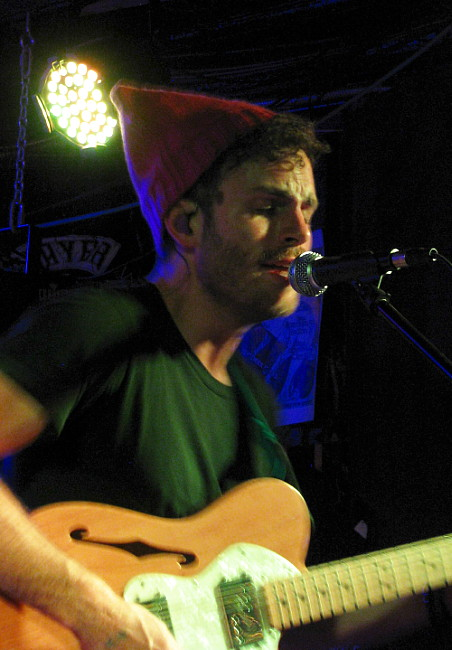
Daniel Shearin, June 2017

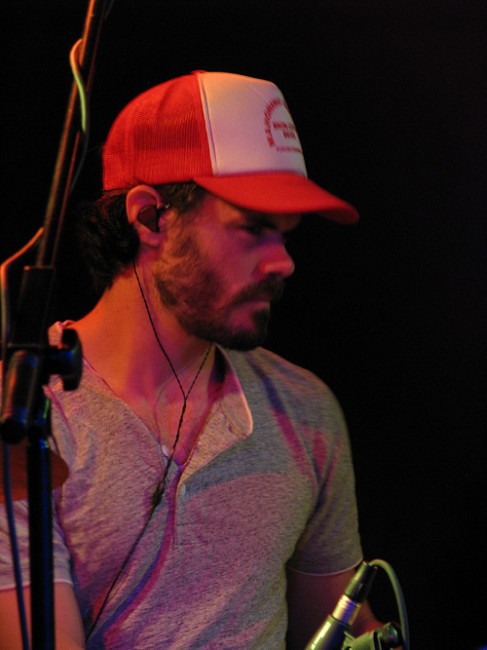
Alex McWalters, June 2017

== Discography ==
Studio albums

- A Stone, a Leaf, an Unfound Door (2012)
- We All the Light (2016)
- Kindness, a Rebel (2018)
- Monoflora (2022)

EPs

- River Whyless (2015)
