= We're All Losing It =

2024 song by Everyone Asked About You

Single by Everyone Asked About You
- Released: June 3, 2024
- Studio: Fellowship Hall Sound (Little Rock)
- Genre: Midwest emo; twee pop; slacker rock
- Length: 3:05
- Label: Numero Group
- Producer: Alex Farrar

Everyone Asked About You singles chronology
"A Better Way to a Broken Heart" (2023)	"We're All Losing It" (2024)	"A Vigil" (2024)

Video visualizer
- "We're All Losing It" on YouTube

"We're All Losing It" is a song by American emo band Everyone Asked About You. The song was written during the solar eclipse on April 8, 2024. It was later recorded in the same week at Fellowship Hall Sound in Little Rock, Arkansas. The song was the first song released by the band in 25 years since the band's last music was recorded in 1999 and their disbandment in 2000.

== Background and recording ==
Everyone Asked About You disbanded in 2000 after releasing three EPs (with one being a split EP with The Shyness Clinic). While the band did record an album, Let's Be Enemies, in 1998, the album was shelved until it was quietly released in 2012 by 25 Heavens. The band reunited after Ken Shipley, the founder of the Numero Group, contacted the band's drummer, Lee Bufford, in 2019 to reissue the band's material. On December 28, 2022, the band played their first show in 23 years.

On April 8, 2024, during the solar eclipse, the band wrote "We're All Losing It." The band recorded the song at Fellowship Hall Sound in Little the same week and was later mixed by record producer Alex Farrar.

== Reception ==
Daniel Grear of Arkansas Times said the song contained the same "clumsy magic" that made the band's earlier content special. Chris Deville of Stereogum also commented on how the song revived the band's unique sound, citing the "morbidly hilarious" lyrics and a "dynamic twinkly emo" sound. Andrew Sacher of BrooklynVegan called it "a quirky, ’90s-style indie-emo song inspired by male pattern baldness".
