= JazzReggae Festival @ UCLA =

Annual festival on Memorial Day weekend

Jazz Reggae Festival @ UCLA
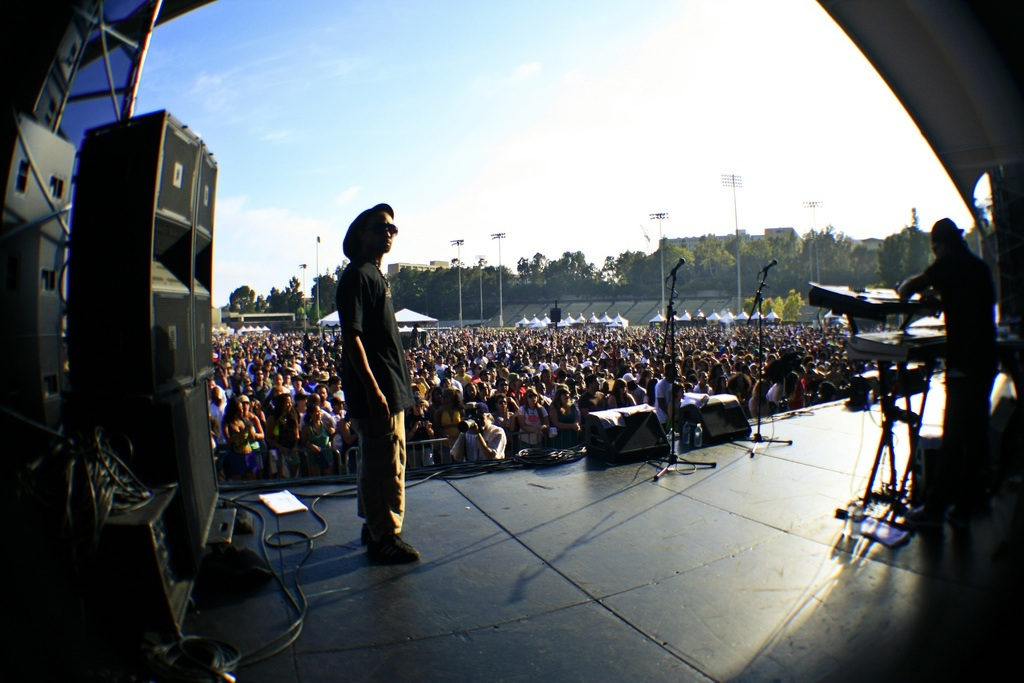
- 2010 JazzReggae Festival
- Genre: Jazz, reggae
- Dates: April 25, 2015
- Locations: UCLA Intramural Field; Westwood Village; Los Angeles, California
- Years active: 1986-present
- Founders: UCLA students
- Website: jazzreggaefest.com

JazzReggae Festival @ UCLA is a two-day festival for music, art, culture and diversity, held every Memorial Day Weekend on the UCLA Intramural Field. By featuring artists such as Jill Scott, Buju Banton, The Roots, Beenie Man, and Stephen Marley, as well as unique opportunities to experience new ethnic foods, crafts and cultures, the event has been highly acclaimed by the press, artists, and the Los Angeles community as one of California's premiere concerts in jazz and reggae.

The 2015 festival was shortened to one day and was held at the Los Angeles Tennis Center due to construction at the UCLA Intramural Field and budget issues.

== History ==
Despite the festival's current reputation as one of Los Angeles' essential yearly events, the concert began in 1986 with humble intentions. Originally held at the UCLA Sunset Canyon Recreation Center, the one-day Jazz Festival at UCLA was created to provide more avenues for student musicians to perform in front of the public. As time moved on and interest in the event increased, a shift in focus occurred, and the festival began to pursue hiring professional musicians. Soon afterwards, a second day featuring Reggae music was added to the annual festival, and it was moved to its current location at the UCLA Intramural Field, where a much larger audience could be accommodated.

After many years of maintaining this format, 2007 marked the most recent structural change to the festival. Instead of limiting day one of the festival to jazz music alone, Jam Day was created to incorporate the tremendous spectrum of music that has also been strongly influenced by the jazz genre. This has allowed the festival to continue hiring premier jazz musicians such as Dr. Lonnie Smith, while also giving opportunities to up and coming stars such as Lupe Fiasco.

== Going green ==
Since 2007 the festival has run the stage with bio-diesel fuel, partnered with Eco Limo, printed their flyers and other promotional material on recycled paper, and included an informational booth on site in which audience members can learn more about ways to be environmentally responsible.

== Producers ==
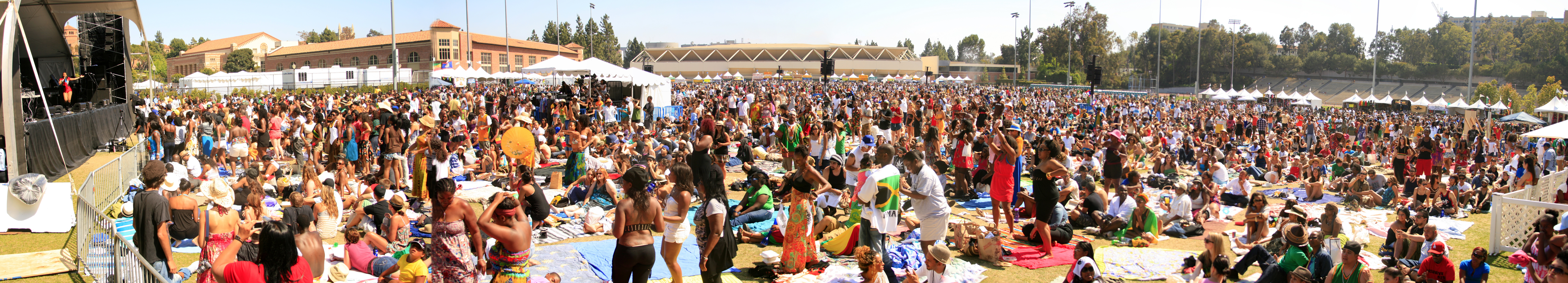
.

The JazzReggae Festival @ UCLA is entirely produced by UCLA students, predominately through the Undergraduate Student Association Council's Cultural Affairs Commission, making it one of the largest student-produced festivals in the nation.

== Art ==
Each year, the JazzReggae Festival also incorporates a great deal of live art into the day’s various amusements. Past festivals have included live interactive painting, sustainable art installations, realtime graffiti art, sculptures, and a gallery for all to browse and purchase works from LA artists. The visual art is another key component to the festival’s status as a cultural constitute of LA, showcasing LA’s art scene, further educating the community about music, art, and sustainability.

== Vendors ==
For the past 26 years, the JazzReggae Festival has teamed up with local restaurants and businesses throughout greater Los Angeles area. With over 70 diverse vendors, the festival is dedicated to working with the men and women responsible for helping continue the city’s tradition of culturally diversity that it celebrates. Additionally, in accordance with its mission to promote sustainability, the festival includes monetary incentives for its food vendors to provide biodegradable and compostable food service items.

== 25th anniversary documentary ==
In 2011, the JazzReggae Festival celebrated its 25th year, continuing on as the largest solely-student run event in the nation. Both days of the festival quickly sold out, with the show itself yielding a large amount of attendees. The Wailing Souls, Little Dragon, Lupe Fiasco, Talib Kweli, Steel Pulse, and Gyptian came together in this celebration of jazz, jam, and reggae music. Coming to represent jazz, reggae, neo-soul, and hip-hop artists alike, the reggae and jam days both showcased an array of music, live art, sustainability, and culinary vendors. A documentary was released with footage of the festival through the years, connected by the stories and experiences of past producers and participants.

== Performers ==
2023

Hempress Sativa, Jordan Ward, Maxo Kream, Your Grandparents, Dj Q Bwoy ( Jamaican Gold Productions ), & Dj Proper of Equality Radio

=== 2015 ===
Wale, Portugal. The Man, Shwayze, Lido, Marian Hill, JMSN and Ce'Cile (Reggae).

=== 2014 ===
Jam Day (Sunday, May 25):

Snoop Dogg, Aloe Blacc, The Internet, Georgia Anne Muldrow, Sarah Reich's Tap Music Project feat. Lee How and Nico Rubio

Reggae Day (Monday, May 26):

Ky-Mani Marley, Black Uhuru, Kevin Lyttle, Gramps Morgan of Morgan Heritage, Sister Carol, Fortunate Youth

=== 2013 ===
Jam Day (Sunday, May 26)

Santigold, Common, The Grouch and Eligh, Jhene Aiko, Ryan McDermott, Gluck Jazz Ensemble, The Street Hearts

Reggae Day (May 27)

Ziggy Marley, Barrington Levy, Mr. Vegas, Marcia Griffiths, Kes the Band

=== 2012 ===
Jam Day (Sunday, May 27)

The Roots, Booker T. Jones, Gary Clark Jr., Thundercat, Selah Sue, Sonnymoon

Reggae Day (May 28)

Shaggy, Tarrus Riley, Collie Buddz, Alison Hinds, Don Carlos, Kes The Band, Cris Cab

=== 2011 ===
Jam Day (Sunday, May 29)

Lupe Fiasco, Little Dragon, The Stepkids, Talib Kweli

Reggae Day (Monday, May 30)

Steel Pulse, Gyptian, Los Rakas, Tanya Stephens, The Wailing Souls

=== 2010 ===
Jam Day (Sunday, May 30)

Raphael Saadiq, Q-Tip, Bilal, The Foreign Exchange, Georgia Anne Muldrow & Declaime, Quadron, Tha Boogie

Reggae Day (Monday, May 31)

Distant Relatives Nas & Damian “Jr. Gong” Marley, Barrington Levy, Cham, Etana, Nneka, Tizzy

=== 2009 ===
Jam Day (Sunday, May 24)

Erykah Badu, De La Soul, Leela James, People Under The Stairs, Ayo, Nino Moschella, NK Band, Mateo, Pangea Collective, Kalil Wilson & the Berkeley Everett Sextet, Louder Than Words

Reggae Day (Monday, May 25)

Mavado, Peetah and Mojo Morgan of Morgan Heritage, Machel Montano, Assassin, Cherine Anderson, Tanto Metro & Devonte, The Dirty Heads, Nola Darling, Eljai, Dan Marcus

=== 2008 ===
Jam Day (Sunday, May 25)

The Roots, John Densmore's Tribal Jazz, Immortal Technique, Amos Lee, Dr. Lonnie Smith, Goapele, Elevaters, JP and the Ambassadors, Brent Canter Trio

Reggae Day (Monday, May 26)

Capleton, Stephen Marley, Mr. Vegas, Alaine, Selena Serrano, Pangea Collective, DJ Courtesy of Krossfayah Sound, Rebelution, Arepa, Uma Verde, Seen Reds

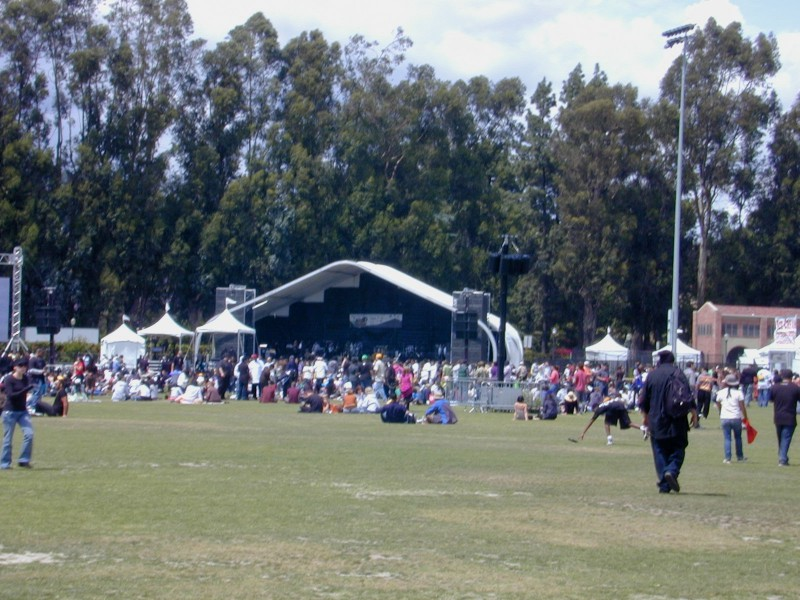
Early hours of JazzReggae Festival 2008

=== 2007 ===
Jam Day (Sunday, May 27)

Jill Scott, Lupe Fiasco, Les Nubians, Soulive, Christian Scott, J Davey, Dujeous

Reggae Day (Monday, 28)

Luciano, Cham, General Degree, Mr. Peppa, Triniti, Joseph Israel, Syren, E Dee, Eljai, DJ Courtesy

=== 2006 ===
Jazz Day (Sunday, May 28)

Dianne Reeves, Trio Beyond: John Scofield, Jack De Johnette & Larry Goldings, Floetry, The Gerald Wilson Orchestra, Kenny Burrell & Friends, Donnie, Bobby Rodriguez & The UCLA Latin Jazz Ensemble

Reggae Day (Monday, May 29)

Buju Banton, Bushman, Assassin, Macka Diamond, Tami Chynn, Panic and The Rebel Emergency, Irie Love

=== 2005 ===
Jazz Day (Sunday, May 29)

Roy Hargrove's RH Factor, India.Arie, Dwele, Unwrapped Allstars featuring Denis Nelson, Sheree Brown, UCLA Jazz Ensemble, Nolan Shaheed, Garth Trinidad

Reggae Day (Monday, May 30)

Anthony B, Rupee, I-Wayne, Red Rat, Elan, Mr. Mutton, Noriega, Valerie

=== 2004 ===
Jazz Day (Sunday, May 30)

Poncho Sanchez, Madlib, Everette Harp, Angaza ft. Pamela Williams, Michele Henderson, Selaelo Selota, Dr. Billy Ingram, Jamal Ali, DJ Simple Citizens, MC: Jerry Quickley

Reggae Day (Monday, May 31)

Beenie Man, Mr. Vegas, Warrior King, Michael Montano with Xtatik, Nasio Fontaine, Milestone, Caribbean Xchange, DJ Blackston International, DJ: Junior Francis

=== 2003 ===
Jazz Day (Sunday, May 25)

Roy Ayers, Russell Gun, Francisco Aguabella, The Bad Plus, Blay Ambolley's African Jazz Ensemble, Emiliano Rodriguez and The Modern Son Conjunto

Reggae Day (Monday, May 26)

Morgan Heritage, Elephant Man, L.M.S., Mr. Easy, Mikey Dread, Fahrenheit, Detour Posse, Cannons, Caribbean Xchange, DJ Apollo of Triple Threat

== See also ==
- List of reggae festivals
- Reggae
