= Syracuse Jazz Festival =

Annual music festival in Syracuse, New York, US

The Syracuse Jazz Festival is an annual free admission outdoor summer music festival staged in Syracuse, New York. It was founded by jazz presenter Frank Malfitano and ran from 1982 to 2017.

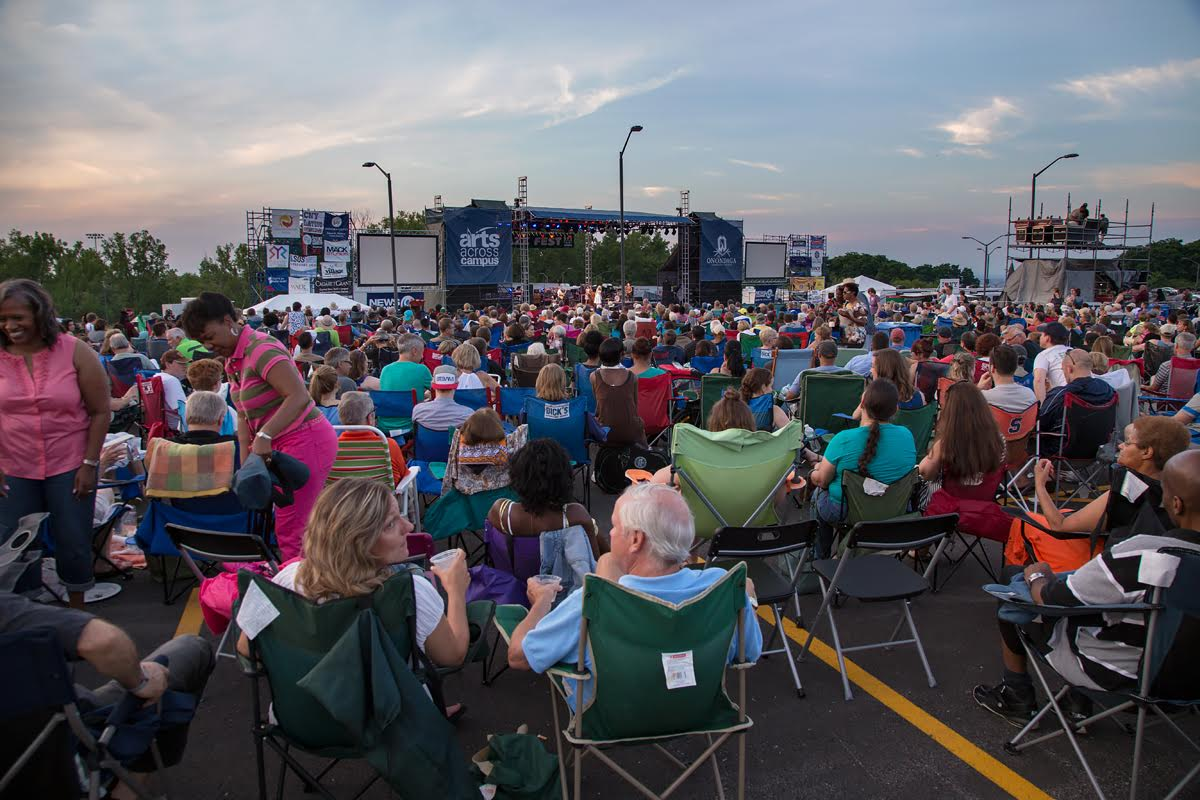
Syracuse Jazz Fest Crowd looking at the Stage.

This festival is still active and starts on June 21 in 2023.

== Recognition ==
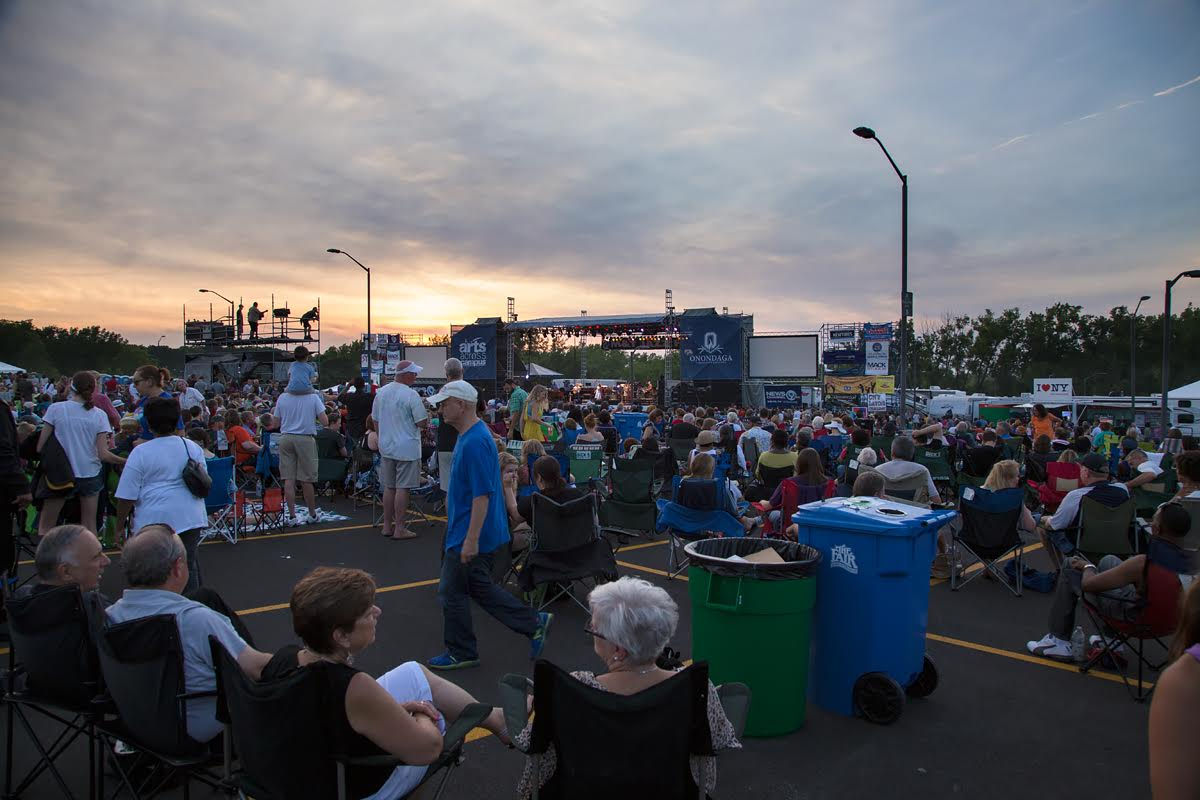
Photo of the Syracuse Jazz Festival

Syracuse Jazz Fest was praised by the International Association for Jazz Education (IAJE), and previously ranked as the Central New York Region's "Best Music Festival". Syracuse Jazz Fest and was ranked as "One of the top five free jazz festivals in America". (Fest Press: A Guide To US Music Festivals) Referred to by Down Beat and Jazz Times Magazines as "The Northeast's Largest Free Jazz Festival".

== History ==
Aretha Franklin headlined the 2015 festival, which also featured Lake Street Dive, Wynton Marsalis & The Jazz At Lincoln Center Orchestra and Buckwheat Zydeco.

Other artists and headliners who appeared and performed at Syracuse Jazz Fest include: Dizzy Gillespie, Ray Charles, Dave Brubeck, Sonny Rollins, Natalie Cole, Chaka Khan, Smokey Robinson, Gino Vannelli, Blood Sweat & Tears, Chuck Mangione, David Sanborn, Roberta Flack, Dionne Warwick, Diana Krall, Grover Washington Jr., Boz Scaggs, Trombone Shorty & Orleans Avenue, The Neville Brothers, Pete Fountain, Mark Murphy, Dr John, Little Jimmy Scott, Gregory Porter, Donovan, The Doobie Brothers, Ronnie Laws, Average White Band, Chico Hamilton, Fathead Newman, The Preservation Hall Jazz Band, Mose Allison, Les McCann, The Funk Brothers, Pat Metheny Group, Return to Forever, George Benson, Al Jarreau, Ivan Lins, Freddy Cole, New York Voices, Treme Brass Band, Larry Coryell, John McLaughlin, Manhattan Transfer, Kenny G, Lizz Wright, Cyrille Aimee, Jane Monheit, Yellowjackets, Jaco Pastorius Big band, Nancy Kelly, Brubeck Brothers, Count Basie Orchestra, Moscow State Jazz Orchestra, Bela Fleck & The Flecktones and The Brecker Brothers.

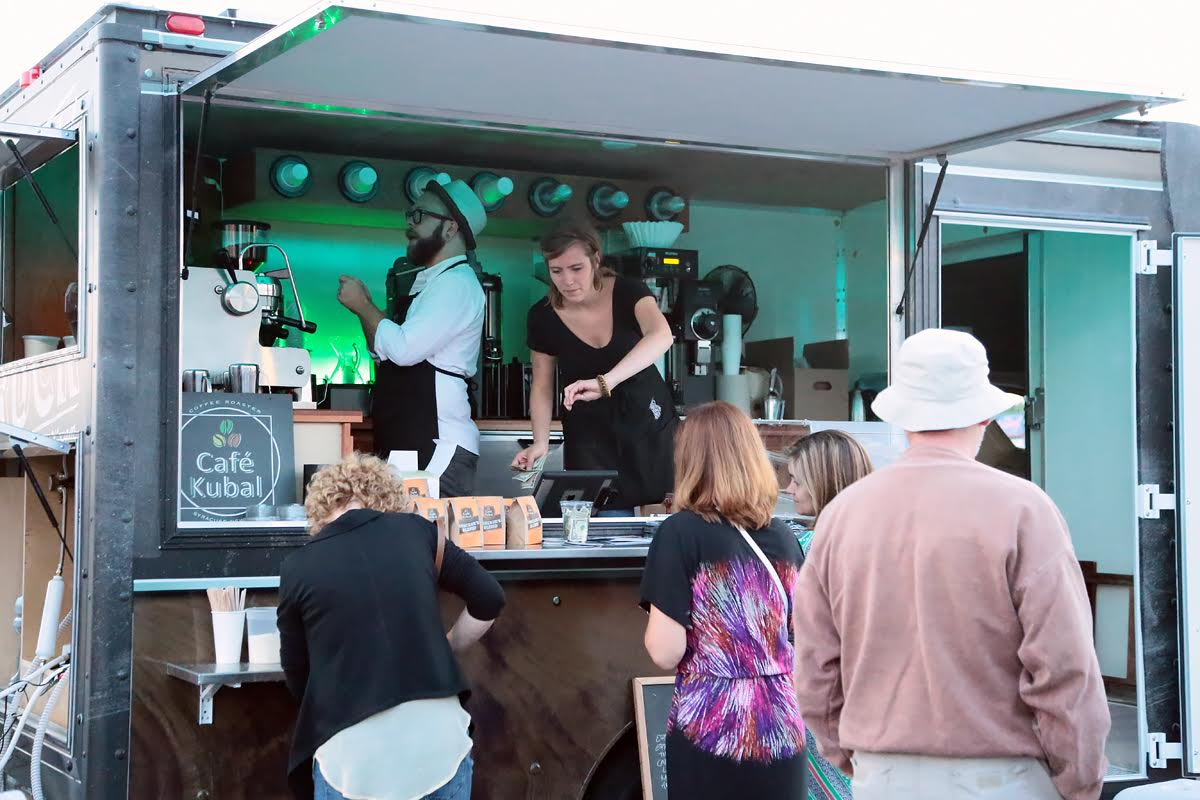
Cafe Kubal Food Truck at Syracuse Jazz Fest

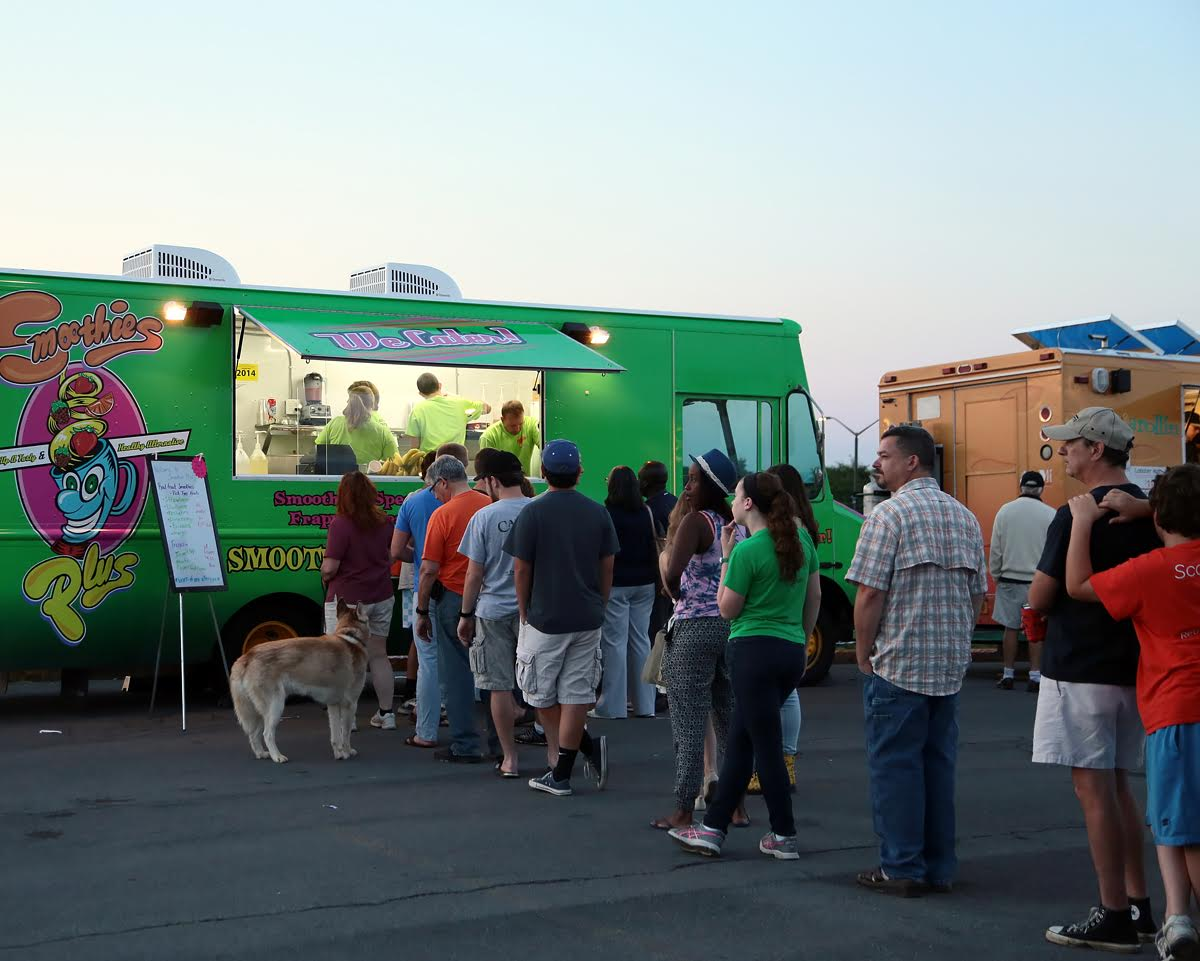
Smoothie food truck at Syracuse Jazz Fest

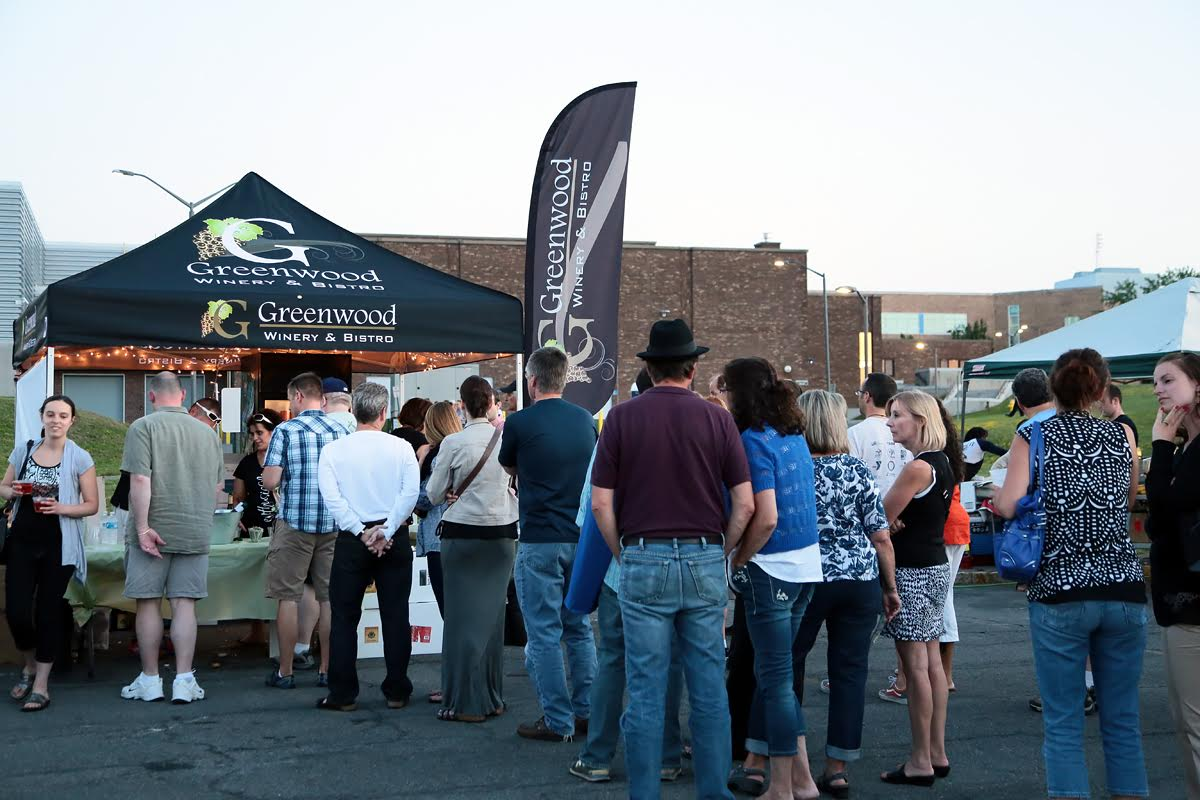
Greenwood Winery at the Syracuse Jazz Festival

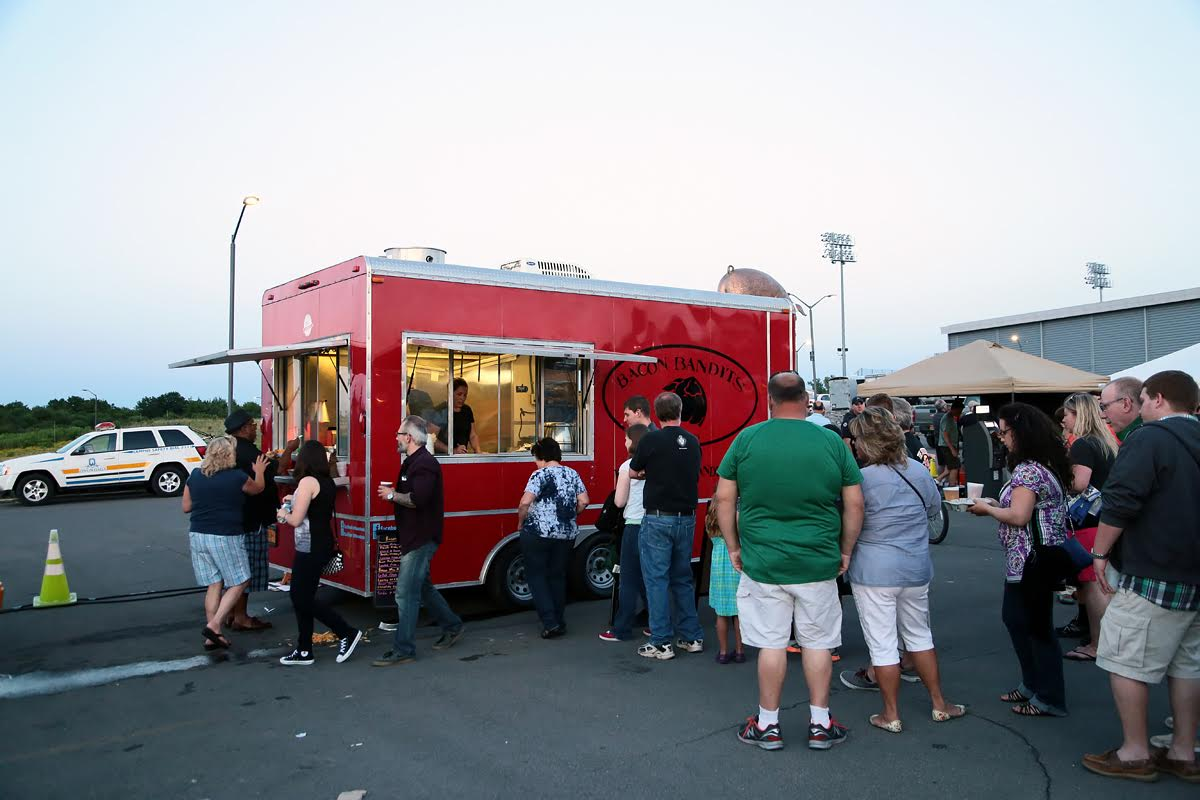
Bacon Bandits at Syracuse Jazz Festival

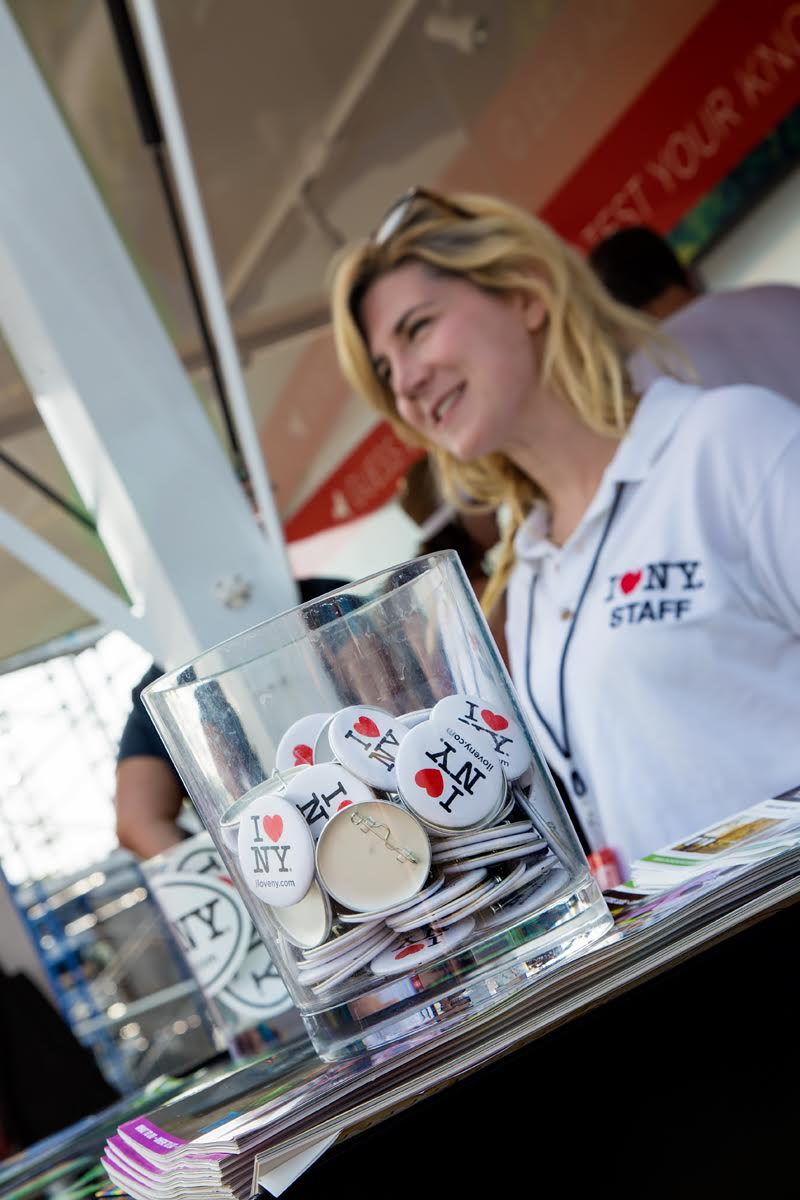
I Love NY Booth at the Syracuse Jazz Fest

=== 2016 ===
Frank Malfitano received a national "Jazz Hero Award" from the Jazz Journalists Association presented by JJA's Susan Brink.

Featured artists included Michael McDonald, Trombone Shorty & Orleans Avenue, Larry Coryell's Original Eleventh House, Raul Malo & The Mavericks, and a Jazz Fest All Star Tribute to legendary jazz vocalist Mark Murphy, featuring appearances by New York Voices, Randy Brecker and Nancy Kelly.
