= American Princes =

American indie rock band

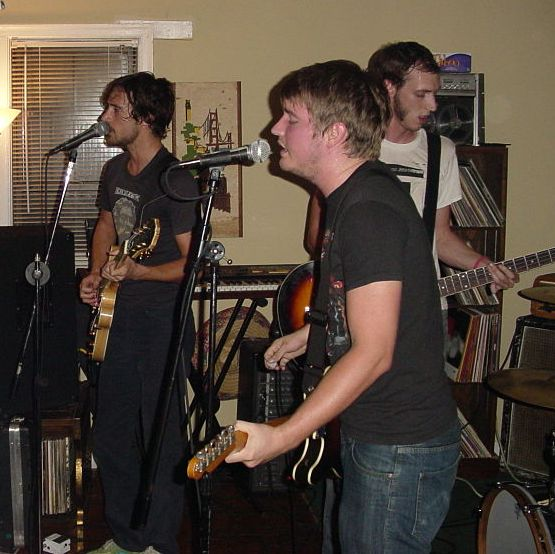
- American Princes performing in 2005

Background information
- Origin: Little Rock, Arkansas, United States
- Genres: Indie rock
- Years active: 2003-Present
- Labels: Max Recordings; Yep Roc Records
- Spinoff of: Sugar and the Raw
- Members: Collins Kilgore; Matthew Quin; David Slade; Will Boyd
- Past members: John Beachboard; Ryan Universe; Luke Hunsicker
- Website: http://www.americanprinces.com

American Princes is an indie rock band from Little Rock, Arkansas, United States. The band started in 2003 when David Slade, then-bassist John Beachboard and drummer Matthew Quin moved to Little Rock from New York City. Within their first year in Arkansas, they met guitarist Collins Kilgore and released their first album, We Are the People, on Max Recordings. In 2004, after their first national tour, American Princes released their second album, Little Spaces, also on Max Recordings. Luke Hunsicker (Sugar and the Raw) joined the 2004 tour in support of Little Spaces.

In 2005, the band signed with Yep Roc Records and went into Richmond's Sound of Music studio with producer Alan Weatherhead to record Less and Less. Since the release of Less and Less some of the bands American Princes have shared the stage with include The Flaming Lips, The Roots, Big Star, The Hold Steady, Spoon, De La Soul, Lucero, Catfish Haven, John Doe, The Apples in Stereo, and others. In 2006 guitarist Will Boyd joined the band, and in the summer of 2007 the band began work on their fourth album with producer Chuck Brody (Wu Tang Clan, Northern State) in New York.

In January 2007 Magnet magazine released their Best Albums of 2006 list on which Less and Less appeared as number 17. American Princes' 2008 release Other People was voted #1 on Magnet Magazine's Best Albums of 2008 list.

Bassist Luke Hunsicker died of brain cancer in August 2010.

== Band members ==
=== Current ===
- Collins Kilgore (Lead Guitar, Vocals)
- Matthew Quin (Drums)
- David Slade (Rhythm Guitar, Vocals)
- Will Boyd (Lead Guitar, Vocals)
- Jack Lloyd (Bass, Vocals)

=== Former ===
- Luke Hunsicker (Bass) (deceased)
- John Beachboard (Bass, Vocals)
- Ryan Universe (Bass)

== Discography ==
- We Are The People (2003, Max Recordings)
- Little Spaces (2004, Max Recordings)
- Less And Less (2006, Yep Roc Records)
- Other People (2008, Yep Roc Records)
- American Princes (EP) (2011, Reynolds Records)
