= Who You Say I Am =

Studio album by Among the Thirsty
- Released: March 17, 2015
- Genre: Contemporary Christian music, worship, pop rock
- Length: 36:06
- Label: BEC
- Producer: Matt Arcaini, Justin Ebach, Scotty Wilbanks

Among the Thirsty chronology
Wonder (2009)	Who You Say I Am (2015)

Who You Say I Am is the second studio album by Among the Thirsty. BEC Recordings released the album on March 17, 2015. Among the Thirsty worked with Matt Arcaini, Justin Ebach, and Scotty Wilbanks, in the production of this album.

== Critical reception ==
Professional ratings
Review scores
Source	Rating
365 Days of Inspiring Media	4/5 stars
CCM Magazine	3.5/5 stars
Christian Music Review	4.5/5
Christian Review Magazine	4.5/5 stars
Jesus Freak Hideout	3/5 stars

Awarding the album three and a half stars for CCM Magazine, Matt Conner writes, the songs "are tailor-made for radio play." Alex Caldwell, specifying in a three star review from Jesus Freak Hideout, recognizes, "It seems that Among The Thirsty may too grow beyond the influences and trappings of their radio-friendly sound too. Who You Say I Am shows a band with a knack for a hook and a promising future."

Christian St. John, rating the album four and a half stars at Christian Review Magazine, states, "Who You Say I Am is a breathtaking release." Giving the album a four star review from 365 Days of Inspiring Media, Joshua Andre says, "a compelling and enjoyable album". Logan Merrick, indicating in a four and a half out of five review by Christian Music Review, describes, "this record has authentic lyrics and fun melodies".

== Track listing ==
No.	Title	Writer(s)	Length
1.	"What Love Looks Like"	Riley Thomas Dunnell, Joe Henderson, John Wall	3:14
2.	"Who You Say I Am"	Ryan Daniel, Justin Ebach, Garrett Hornbuckle	3:35
3.	"Completely"	Daniel, Stephanie Lewis	3:49
4.	"Trust"	Daniel, Lewis, Scotty Wilbanks	3:46
5.	"At the Cross"	Daniel, Wilbanks	3:39
6.	"Beautiful Life"	Daniel, Lewis, Wilbanks	3:04
7.	"Over and Over"	Daniel, Wilbanks	3:55
8.	"Do It for You"	Daniel, Brian Duffy, Wilbanks	3:36
9.	"Never Leave Me"	Daniel, Wilbanks	3:49
10.	"How You Love Me"	Daniel, Wilbanks	3:39
Total length:			45:04
