= Hollywood Bowl Jazz Festival =

Music festival

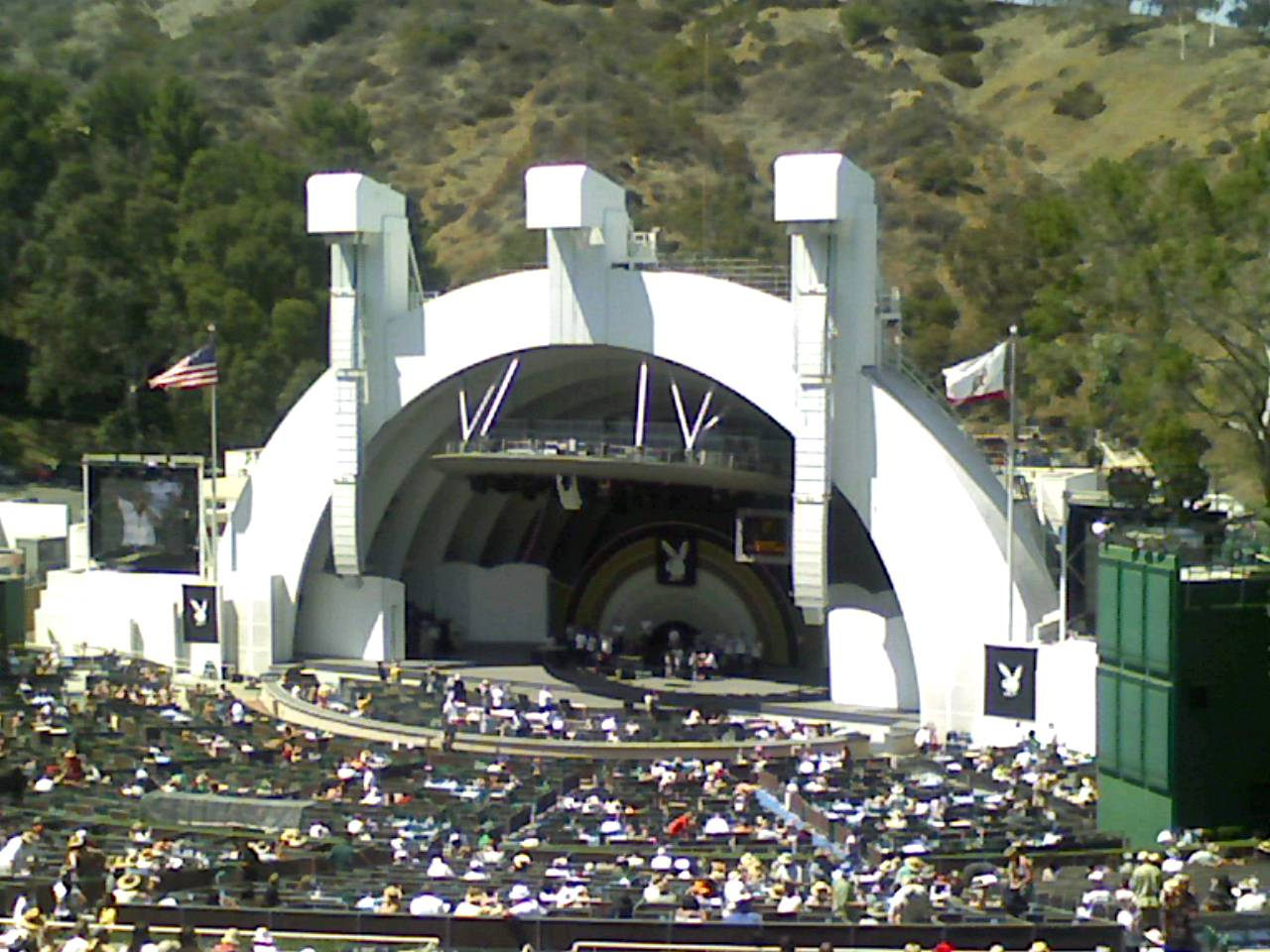
- Playboy Jazz Festival in Los Angeles, 2007
- Genre: Jazz
- Dates: June
- Locations: Hollywood Bowl; Los Angeles, California, U.S.
- Coordinates: 34°06′46″N 118°20′20″W
- Years active: 2022–present; previously held as Playboy Jazz Festival: 1959; 1979–2019
- Founders: Hugh Hefner
- Capacity: 17,500
- Organizer: Los Angeles Philharmonic Association
- Website: www.hollywoodbowl.com/concerts-and-events/hollywood-bowl-jazz-festival

The Hollywood Bowl Jazz Festival is an event held in the Hollywood Bowl that celebrates jazz and features both established and up-and-coming jazz musicians. Founded in 1959 by Hugh Hefner as the Playboy Jazz Festival, it was held in Chicago but did not recur until 1979, when the venue was moved to the Hollywood Bowl.

In 2022, the festival changed its name. It was held June 25 and 26 that year and hosted by comedian Arsenio Hall.

The event is organized by the Los Angeles Philharmonic Association, which presents the summer Hollywood Bowl concerts.

== History ==
The festival was founded as the Playboy Jazz Festival by Hugh Hefner and first held in Chicago at the Chicago Stadium in 1959. However, the festival did not occur again until 1979, when the Hollywood Bowl played host in Los Angeles in celebration of the magazine's 25th anniversary. The event is held there annually; in 2022, it changed its name to the Hollywood Bowl Jazz Festival.

== The Festival ==
The Festival is held on a Saturday and Sunday in mid-June. Bill Cosby was the emcee of the majority of the annual festivals from 1979 to 2012. In 2013, comedian George Lopez took over after Cosby retired, and continued hosting through 2019. The 2022 and 2023 festivals were hosted by comedian Arsenio Hall.

In 2014, the Los Angeles Philharmonic Association, which presents the summer Hollywood Bowl concerts, assumed presenting and booking duties.

The Festival is broadcast live by the Southern California jazz public radio station KKJZ.

In 2020, the festival was cancelled due to the COVID-19 pandemic.

In November 2021 the name was changed to "Hollywood Bowl Jazz Festival" effective June 2022.

The Hollywood Bowl Jazz Festival has been rebranded as the Blue Note Jazz Festival for 2025, following a partnership between the LA Phil and the iconic Blue Note Jazz Club. The festival is scheduled for June 14 and 15, 2025, at the Hollywood Bowl in Los Angeles. The full lineup will be announced on February 18, 2025.
