= Unwound discography =

Rock band discography

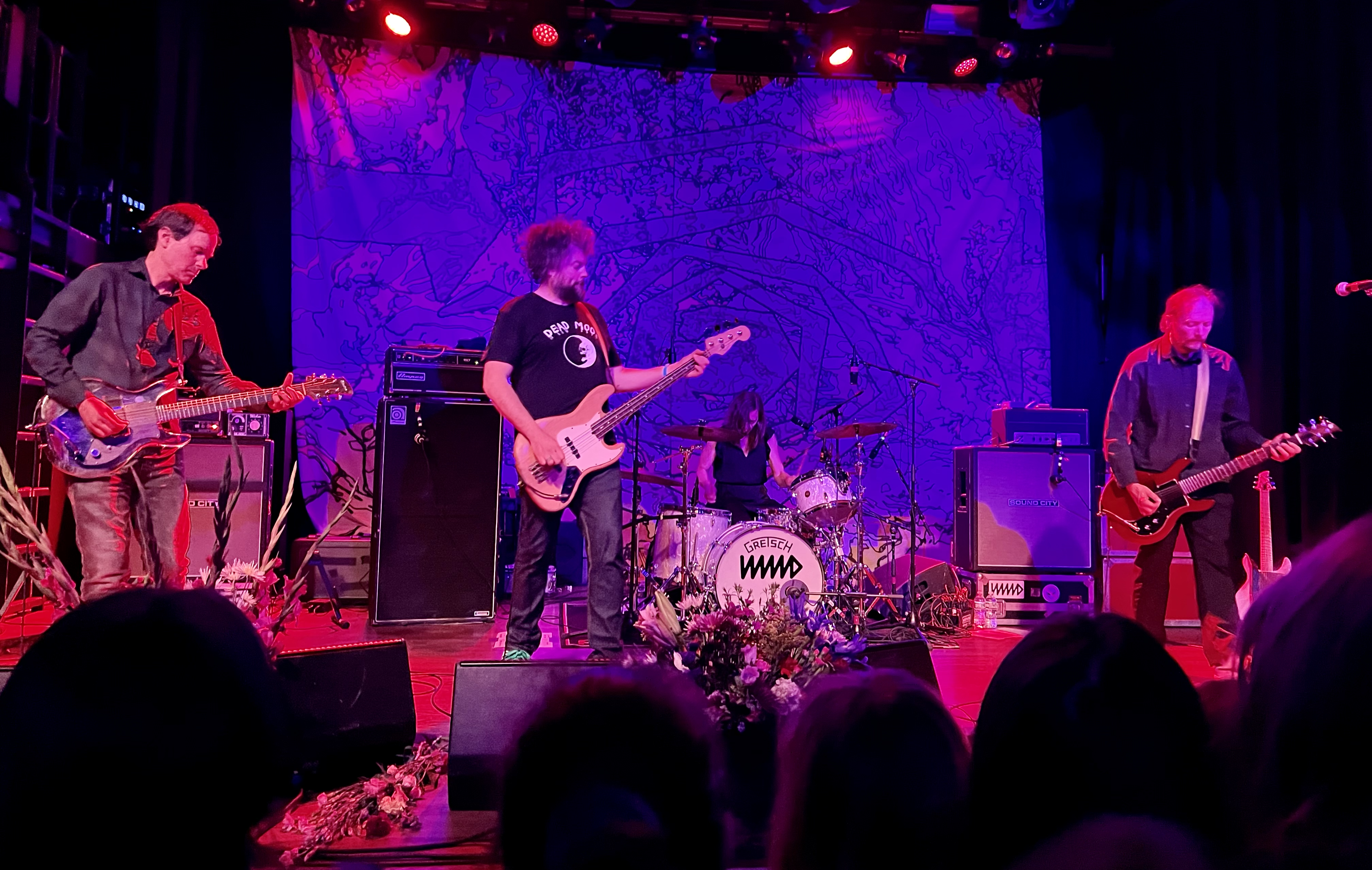
- Unwound performing in 2023.
- Studio albums: 8
- EPs: 5
- Live albums: 3
- Compilation albums: 8
- Singles: 10
- Music videos: 3

The discography of American post-hardcore band Unwound consists of eight studio albums, three live albums, five EPs, ten singles, three music videos, and eight compilation albums.

The band originally formed in 1988 under the name Giant Henry and recorded an album's worth of material (the album would be released in 2013 as Big Baby) before changing their name to Cygnus X-1 for a short period of time in 1991 before settling on Unwound. The band released a self-titled demo that same year and not long after signed to Kill Rock Stars, who would release a majority of the band's discography, beginning with their debut album Fake Train. A year later in 1994, New Plastic Ideas was released, as well as a split EP with Helmet, Slug, and Hammerhead. While Fake Train was their first album to be released, their real first album, Unwound, recorded in May 1992, wasn't released until 1995, the same year as The Future of What. 1996 saw the release of Repetition and a split with Steel Pole Bath Tub. In 1997, the EP The Light at the End of the Tunnel is a Train was released, and 1998 saw the release of Challenge for a Civilized Society. The band released their first two compilation albums in 1999, Further Listening and A Single History: 1991–1997, and the band's first music video for the song "Lifetime Achievement Award". The only release from 2000 was a split with Versus. 2001 saw the band release their final album Leaves Turn Inside You and a music video for "Radio Gra". The band's final release before disbanding in 2002 was a music video for "Scarlette".

Since 2013, The Numero Group has been remastering and reissuing the band's music. In 2023, the band announced several reunion shows and has stayed active since, but it has yet to release new music.

== Albums ==
=== Studio albums ===
Title	Release info
Fake Train	July 7, 1993; Kill Rock Stars; CD, LP, cassette
New Plastic Ideas	March 18, 1994; Kill Rock Stars; CD, LP, cassette
The Future of What	April 24, 1995; Kill Rock Stars; CD, LP, cassette
Unwound	August 14, 1995; Honey Bear Records; CD, LP; Recorded in 1992
Repetition	April 9, 1996; Kill Rock Stars; CD, LP, cassette
Challenge for a Civilized Society	January 13, 1998; Kill Rock Stars; CD, LP, cassette
Leaves Turn Inside You	April 17, 2001; Kill Rock Stars; CD, LP
Big Baby	April 20, 2013; Numero Group; LP; Recorded in 1991 as Giant Henry; Record Store Day release

=== Live albums ===
Title	Release info
Live Leaves	December 11, 2012; Not on label; Credited to UNWND; LP
7/26/2001	October 1, 2013; Numero Group; LP
06/30/1999: Reykjavik, Iceland	October 14, 2014; Numero Group; LP

=== Compilation albums ===
Title	Release info
Further Listening	May 24, 1996; Matador; CD
A Single History: 1991–1997	September 14, 1999; Kill Rock Stars; CD, LP
Kid Is Gone	September 13, 2013; Numero Group; CD, LP
Rat Conspiracy	March 18, 2014; Numero Group; CD, LP
No Energy	October 14, 2014; Numero Group; LP
Empire	September 4, 2015; Numero Group; LP
What Was Wound	December 5, 2016; Numero Group; CD+DVD
Faked Train	September 25, 2020; Numero Group; Digital

== EPs ==
Title	Release info
Unwound	1991; Not on label; Demo tape
Unwound	1993; Gravity Records; 7"; Reissued by Numero Group in 2020 as You Bite My Tongue
Jabberjaw Vol. 1	1994; Mammoth Records; 7"; Split with Helmet, Slug, and Hammerhead
The Light at the End of the Tunnel is a Train	1997; Kill Rock Stars; LP
Live in London	1999; LoveLetter Records; 12"; Reissued by Numero Group in 2015 as Peel Sessions

== Singles ==
Title	Release info
"Caterpillar"/"Miserific Condition"/"Love & Fear"	1992; Kill Rock Stars; 7"
"Kandy Korn Rituals"/"Against"/"Hating In D"	1992; Kill Rock Stars; 7"
"Negated"/"Said Serial"	1994; Troubleman; 7"
"MK Ultra"/"Totality"	1994; Kill Rock Stars; 7"
"Seen Not Heard"/"Tokyo"	1996; Honey Bear; 7"; Split with Steel Pole Bath Tub
"Corpse Pose"/"Everything Is Weird"	1996; Kill Rock Stars; 7"
"Torch Song"/"All In Doubt"	2000; Troubleman Unlimited; 7"
"Demons Sing Love Songs"	2015; Numero Group; Digital
Fantasma	2021; Numero Group; 7"; Split with Karate
For Your Entertainment	2023; Numero Group; Split with Pelican and Karate; Digital, cassette

== Music videos ==
Song name	Release info
"Lifetime Achievement Award"	1999; Recorded in 1996
"Radio Gra"	2001
"Scarlette"	2002

== Appearances on other releases ==
Year	Song title	Release	Label
1991	"You Speak Jealousy"	Kill Rock Stars	Kill Rock Stars
1992	"Stumbling Block"	Throw: The Yoyo Studio Compilation	Yoyo
1992	"Bionic"	International Pop Underground Convention	K Records
1993	"8/15/93"	Live at the X-Ray	X-Ray Tapes
1994	"Plight"	Our Life Could Be Your Live: A Tribute to D. Boon and the Minutemen	n/a
1994	"New Radio Hit"	The Smitten Love Song Comp.	Karate Brand
1994	"Eternalux"	A Day In The Park: A Compilation of Now Sounds	The Now Sound
1995	"Broken E Strings"	Basement Tapes: A KSPC Compilation of Live Recordings	KSPC
1995	"Dragnalus"	Half-Cocked	Matador
1995	"Lucky Acid"	Wänt.Comp.Uno.	Wäntage USA
1995	"Rat Bite"	The In-Store Play Sampler	Mordam
1996	"Valentine Card"	Yoyo A Go Go	Yoyo
1997	"Hating In D"	Some Songs from the Kill Rock Stars Singles	Kill Rock Stars
1998	"Laugh Track"	Rock Sound Volume 26	Rock Sound
1998	"Data"	Musique Sans Frontieres	Matador
1998	"Laugh Track"	Ox-Compilation #30: Turn The Radio Off And Play Some Real Music!	Ox Fanzine
1999	"NO TECH!"	Everything is Nice: The Matador Records 10th Anniversary Anthology	Matador
1999	"Laugh Track"	Opscene Promo CD #6	Paieren Tijger
1999	"Unauthorized Autobiography"	Nowcore!: The Punk Rock Evolution	K-Tel
1999	"Lifetime Achievement Award"	Kill Rock Stars Video	Kill Rock Stars
1999	"Rising Blood"	Beware The Cat #10	Beware The Cat
1999	"Lifetime Achievement Award"	Taty Du Post Rock	Ultraviolet
1999	"Pinwheel Signaling"	Multi-Vitamin Comp	Punk In My Vitamin
1999	"Broken E Strings"	Audio Ambrosia	Cductive
2000	"Mile Me Deaf"	Jackson's Jukebok	Kill Rock Stars
2000	"Dragnalus"	X-Ray Visions Soundtrack Album	Kwali-T
2001	"Behold The Salt"	Sonic Youth Presents All Tomorrow's Parties 1.1	ATP/Recordings
2001	"Demons Sing Love Songs"	Draw Me A Riot	Matador
2001	"Lazslo"	Troubleman Mixtape	Troubleman
2001	"Arboretum (live)"	Songs for Cassavetes	Better Looking
2001	"MK Ultra"	Turbo's Tunes	Kill Rock Stars
2001	"Look A Ghost"	2001 Sampler	Mordam
2003	"Demons Sing Love Songs"	Mollie's Mix	Kill Rock Stars
2005	"Valentine Card (live)"	Video Fanzine III	Kill Rock Stars
2007	"Corpse Pose"	A Tribute to No: 18 @ Atlas Pasaj Where Thrilling Music Meets With Nonsensical Business	Kod Muzik
2008	"Corpse Pose"	Mountain Magic: A Kill Rock Stars Collection 1991-2000	Kill Rock Stars
2008	"Scarlette"	Magic Mountain: A Kill Rock Stars Collection 2001-2008	Kill Rock Stars
2008	"Kandy Korn Rituals"	Me Gusta Rococo, Rococo is Fun Stuff	Rococo
2011	"Corpse Post"	20 Years of Kill Rock Stars	Kill Rock Stars
2013	"You Speak Jealousy"	Kill Rock Stars/Stars Kill Rock/Rock Stars Kill	Kill Rock Stars
2013	"Below the Salt"	Duyster.4	PIAS
2016	"Totality"	19	Numero Group
2023	"Were, Are & Was or Is"	Numero Twenty	Numero Group

== See also ==
- Unwound discography at Discogs
