= No Energy =

2014 compilation album by Unwound

Compilation album by Unwound
- Released: October 14, 2014
- Recorded: December 1994 - May 3, 1996
- Genre: Post-hardcore
- Length: 2:02:58
- Label: The Numero Group

Unwound chronology
Rat Conspiracy (2013)	No Energy (2014)	Empire (2015)

No Energy is the fifth compilation released by the post-hardcore band Unwound. It features the The Future of What and Repetition albums along with an extra disc of singles, alternate versions, and live material from the sessions of their respective albums. It was released on October 14, 2014, by The Numero Group as the third of a four-compilation reissue series.

== History ==
Unwound formed in 1988 and broke up in 2002. In 2013, it was announced that Chicago-based archival record label The Numero Group were going to remaster and reissue the band's full discography, its centerpiece being four boxsets separated by albums.

The title comes from the opening lyric to "New Energy" from The Future of What. The booklet includes an essay written by David Wilcox. One version of the album included the live album 6/30/1999: Reyjavik, Iceland as a bonus LP, a session the band recorded at RÚV. The LP was eventually made available separately on streaming services.

== Reception ==
Pitchfork gave New Energy a 8.6, saying that "Unwound are complicated enough to stay a cult favorite forever, but Numero’s reissue campaign goes a long way to placing them in the context they deserve".

An review in PopMatters gave the album an 8 and said the boxset "accomplishes everything a good reissue should, presenting a blast from the past that pays proper tribute to how prolific and proficient its subject was in its heyday".

Treble said that Unwound's "evolution from raw, scrappy punks to muscular post-hardcore powerhouse, and eventually avant garde punk artistes, makes perfect sense when it’s all lined up in front of you. But natural progression, much like common sense, isn’t always so natural, and where many of the group’s national peers flamed out or came to an abrupt end in half the time, Unwound approached self-improvement like spring cleaning".

== Tracklisting ==
The Future of What

All tracks are written by Trosper, Rumsey, and Lund.

No.	Title	Length
1.	"New Energy"	1:58
2.	"Demolished"	2:49
3.	"Natural Disasters"	3:14
4.	"Re-Enact The Crime"	2:43
5.	"Equally Stupid"	3:06
6.	"Pardon My French"	1:30
7.	"Descension"	4:20
8.	"Accidents On Purpose"	1:55
9.	"Petals Like Bricks"	2:22
10.	"Vern's Answers To The Masses"	0:39
11.	"Here Come The Dogs"	2:06
12.	"Disappoint"	5:19
13.	"Swan"	8:05

Repetition

All tracks are written by Trosper, Rumsey, and Lund.

No.	Title	Length
1.	"Message Received"	3:06
2.	"Corpse Pose"	3:05
3.	"Unauthorized Autobiography"	2:47
4.	"Lowest Common Demoninator"	4:31
5.	"Sensible"	2:59
6.	"Lady Elect"	5:35
7.	"Fingernails On A Chalkboard"	4:56
8.	"Murder Movies"	1:48
9.	"Next Exit"	4:30
10.	"Devoid"	3:13
11.	"Go To Dallas And Take A Left"	4:08
12.	"For Your Entertainment"	5:40

No Energy

All tracks are written by Trosper, Rumsey, and Lund.

No.	Title	Length
1.	"Corpse Pose (Single Version)"	3:05
2.	"Everything Is Weird"	2:51
3.	"Seen Not Heard"	3:41
4.	"Next Exit"	3:31
5.	"Fingernails On A Chalkboard"	2:31
6.	"MKUltra"	5:43
7.	"Usual Doseage"	8:04
8.	"Swan"	7:08

== Credits ==
Derived from liner notes.

- Justin Trosper - vocals, guitar, writer
- Vern Rumsey - bass, writer
- Sara Lund - drums, writer
- Maria Rice - mastering engineer
- Jeff Lipton - mastering engineer
- Henry H. Owings - design
- Judson Picco - editor
- Julia Dratel - transcriber
- Iakov Chernikhov - illustration
- Jason Funk - photography
- Kathi Wilcox - photography
