= Leaves Turn Inside You =

Studio album by Unwound
- Released: April 17, 2001
- Recorded: 2000—March 2001
- Studio: MagRecOne (Olympia, Washington)
- Genres: Indie rock; post-rock; post-hardcore; psychedelia; noise rock
- Length: 76:45
- Labels: Kill Rock Stars; Numero Group
- Producer: Unwound

Unwound chronology
A Single History: 1991–1997 (1999)	Leaves Turn Inside You (2001)	Kid Is Gone (2013)

Leaves Turn Inside You is the seventh and final studio album by the American post-hardcore band Unwound, released on April 17, 2001 by Kill Rock Stars.

The album received critical acclaim from several music publications, both contemporarily and after its original release, following later reissues by Numero Group. Marking the return of original drummer and co-founder Brandt Sandeno who had switched to keyboards and guitar, it is the band's only studio album to feature all four members.

== Background and recording ==
Unlike previous Unwound albums, Leaves Turn Inside You was recorded in 2000 by the band members at their own built studio, MagRecOne ("Magnetic Recording One"), in Olympia, Washington. Singer and guitarist Justin Trosper described the album as "a record that could stand as a final statement because there were already tremors preceding our impending earthquake." While developing the album in MagRecOne, the band had a newfound sense of creative freedom that broke away from their routine with the band's longtime producer and engineer Steve Fisk, with the album instead involving him as an instrumentalist. The album title came from a free association writing session held by Trosper, originally being the phrase "leaves turn inside me"; he was also "doing dream journals to work out ideas for lyrics so the whole album has dreamish gnostic quasi-religious themes throughout it".

Trosper said that he was mainly interested in "turning down the distortion and adding more textures and tones", and in using the recording studio as an instrument; he personally studied albums that were of interest to him at the time, including David Bowie's Low, Public Image Ltd's Metal Box, the Flaming Lips' The Soft Bulletin, Radiohead's then-recently released Kid A, Burzum's ambient music albums released while in prison, the Cure's The Head on the Door, the sessions for the Beach Boys' Smile, and "60s British stuff like The Beatles, Led Zeppelin, and The Kinks." Along with idiosyncratic studio production including mic work, disorienting mixing and sound collages, the record features usage of the Mellotron and several ARP synthesizers. All songs were written and recorded by Unwound, with the production being handled between the three band members.

== Release and packaging ==
Leaves Turn Inside You was released as a double LP and double CD on April 17, 2001 by the independent record label Kill Rock Stars, which also released the band's previous five studio albums. The CD version is enhanced with two music videos: "Radio Gra" (by Slater Bradley) and "Scarlette" (by animator Zak Margolis). A promotional CD version on Matador Europe exists, which features the whole album on one CD, omitting the videos; it comes in a slimline jewelcase with a different cover art.

== Music and lyrics ==
Leaves Turn Inside You has been regarded as continuing down the stylistically exploratory path of Repetition and Challenge for a Civilized Society. For instance, the song "Below the Salt" features delicate piano, heavy usage of reverb, and intimate, near-whispered vocals, while "Scarlette" brings back the band's hardcore punk origins. "Terminus" features cryptic lyrics and apocalyptic chamber orchestration. Drummer Sara Lund and Janet Weiss of sonic/geographic contemporaries Sleater-Kinney provide backing vocals on "Demons Sing Love Songs". The discs are titled 2 and 3, implying that Challenge for a Civilized Society is the first one.

According to Treble's Jeff Terich, the album saw Unwound disregard their former "noisy [and] pulsing" punk for "nuanced" art punk and shoegaze songcraft. He would go on to hail it "an avant-garde masterpiece". Sputnikmusic saw the group devote to "mellow" and "lyrically anxious" indie rock for its majority. They also summarized it as a "melancholic" fusion of dream pop, noise rock, and post-rock.

== Critical reception ==
Professional ratings
Aggregate scores
Source	Rating
Metacritic	87/100
Review scores
Source	Rating
AllMusic	5/5 stars
Alternative Press	7/10
Mojo	3.5/5 stars
Pitchfork	9.0/10 (2001); 9.0/10 (2015)
Rock Sound	3.5/5 stars
Spin	9/10
Sputnikmusic	5/5
Stylus Magazine	A

Leaves Turn Inside You received critical acclaim. AllMusic reviewer Bryan Carroll described the album as "a unique, epic effort from one of the most inventive and dynamic rock bands in recent memory". Max Finneran, writing for Spin, commented: "Rounding off the edges of its tried and true punk-rock grind with the melodic and rhythmic tropes of '60s psychedelia, Unwound has perfectly re-imagined a sound that most art-students wouldn't even spit on the first time around". PopMatters critic Matt Cibula stated that Unwound "plays with a tightness and richness that few bands can touch anymore; they have turned into the metal Minutemen". Camilo Arturo Leslie of Pitchfork wrote that he was "convinced that, if you've been following this band's development, the initial bewildered expression on your face will give way to total enchantment".

In The Wire, Tom Ridge called the album a "radical departure in its scope and overall sound" from Unwound's previous works. According to Ridge, "the hardcore scene has spat out such individual classics at infrequent intervals, and Leaves sits comfortably alongside Hüsker Dü's Zen Arcade, The Minutemen's Double Nickels on the Dime and Sonic Youth's Daydream Nation."

Publication	Country	Accolade	Rank
Cokemachineglow	Canada	Top 100 Albums of the 2000s	No. 54
Pitchfork	US	The Top 100 Albums of 2000-04	No. 95
LAS Magazine	US	Top 50 Albums of the 2000s	No. 20
Sputnikmusic	US	Top 100 Albums of the Decade	No. 99

=== Legacy and impact ===
Leaves' status as a classic in post-hardcore music has solidified in recent years, with it being deemed arguably the best album in the genre. In 2015, Joe Banks of The Quietus wrote of its worthiness to stand as one of the genre's "great" double albums alongside Zen Arcade and Daydream Nation. Also that year, the staff of Treble chose Leaves as one of 10 essential 21st century classics that would "[pave] the way for a whole new era" of future post-hardcore music. Far Out's Sam Kemp dubbed it one of the genre's definitive records in 2021.

In a 2014 Quietus article, Angus Andrew of experimental rock group Liars revealed Leaves to be one of his favorite records, calling it an "overwhelmingly complete and brave" entry in Unwound's "near flawless" discography. Noting their move towards an "exciting, challenging and experimental" sound, he dubbed the album a "giant stylistic leap of faith" that his band "took a large dose of influence" from.

== Track listing ==
All music composed by Unwound.

Disc one: 2
No.	Title	Length
1.	"We Invent You"	5:52
2.	"Look a Ghost"	3:04
3.	"December"	4:03
4.	"Treachery"	4:17
5.	"Terminus"	9:40
6.	"Demons Sing Love Songs"	4:03
7.	"Off This Century"	5:30

Disc two: 3
No.	Title	Length
8.	"One Lick Less"	5:41
9.	"Scarlette"	4:44
10.	"October All Over"	4:59
11.	"Summer Freeze"	5:36
12.	"Radio Gra"	5:56
13.	"Below the Salt"	10:39
14.	"Who Cares"	2:41

== Personnel ==
Credits adapted from liner notes for Leaves Turn Inside You.

Unwound

- Justin Trosper – guitar, vocals, background vocals (on "Summer Freeze"), Mellotron (on "Who Cares"), Rhodes piano (on "Terminus"), piano (on "Below the Salt"), synthesizer (on "Treachery" and "Radio Gra"), engineering, production, tape operation
- Vern Rumsey – bass, guitar (on "We Invent You" and "Terminus"), organ (on "Off This Century"), piano (on "October All Over" and "Who Cares"), vocals (on "December"), engineering, production, tape operation
- Sara Lund – drums, percussion, background vocals (on "Demons Sing Love Songs"), engineering, production, tape operation

Additional musicians

- Brandt Sandeno – background vocals (on "Look a Ghost" and "Summer Freeze"), harpsichord (on "Demons Sing Love Songs"), Mellotron (on "We Invent You", "Demons Sing Love Songs", "October All Over", "Radio Gra" and "Below the Salt"), organ (on "We Invent You"), Rhodes piano (on "Terminus" and "One Lick Less"), slide guitar (on "Off This Century"), vibraphone (on "Who Cares"), engineering, tape operation
- Murray W. – Optiphone (on "One Lick Less"), Dynachord (on "Summer Freeze")
- Steve Fisk – Mellotron (on "Scarlette"), jazz performance (on "Who Cares")
- Derek Johnson – cello (on "Terminus")
- Janet Weiss – background vocals (on "Demons Sing Love Songs")

Technical personnel

- Kip Beelman – engineering, tape operation
- Pat Castaldo – layout
- Phil Ek – engineering, tape operation
- Roger Seibel – mastering
- Stefano Giovannini – photography
