= Fake Train =

Studio album by Unwound
- Released: July 7, 1993
- Recorded: February 13–March 3, 1993
- Studio: Avast! (Seattle, Washington)
- Genres: Post-hardcore; noise rock
- Length: 44:56
- Label: Kill Rock Stars
- Producers: Steve Fisk; Unwound

Unwound chronology
Fake Train (1993)	New Plastic Ideas (1994)

Fake Train is the debut studio album by the American post-hardcore band Unwound, released on July 7, 1993, by Kill Rock Stars.

== Background ==
While being the first studio album in the band's catalog to be released, and the first LP on Kill Rock Stars, it is actually the second album by the group to be recorded. Their first full-length was recorded in 1992 with drummer Brandt Sandeno, who left the group shortly after recording. That album was shelved and was not released until 1995, after the group already released 3 full-lengths via Kill Rock Stars. As suggested by Sandeno, Sara Lund was chosen as his replacement. Her drumming style would shape the band from their initial rugged hardcore punk sound to the more post-hardcore style that is presented on this album. The album was under the working title of "Rat Conspiracy," which would go on to become the name of the box-set that Fake Train would appear on in 2014.

== Recording ==
Fake Train was recorded and mixed during 2 weekends. In retrospect, Sara Lund expressed her distaste for her performance on the album, for she believed she performed very poorly on it. The entire first side of the record was overdubbed with amplifier feedback. The album was released as the band's full-length debut on Kill Rock Stars on CD, LP, and cassette formats. They would continue to release most of their recordings through Kill Rock Stars until their break-up in 2001. Fake Train was also the first music-only recording released by Kill Rock Stars; releases made before Fake Train on the label were spoken word pieces.

== Packaging ==
The cover art is a vandalized copy of Tom Jones's 1970 album Tom, which frontman Justin Trosper had hanging in his home.

== Reception ==
Professional ratings
Review scores
Source	Rating
AllMusic	3/5 stars

Michael Azzerad and Ira Robbins of Trouser Press were more positive, writing that the album "boasts a formidable dynamic range, from the meditative instrumental "Were, Are and Was or Is," which pours sublimely chirping feedback over dappled guitar arpeggios, through the pile-driving "Pure Pain Sugar" and up to the apoplectic heights of "Lucky Acid" and the schizo noise bursts of the aptly named "Nervous Energy"". Despite criticizing Justin Trosper's vocals as "generic indie-rock holler" and the album's general lack of hooks, they found them to be "more than compensated for by the band's inventive attack (especially by Lund) and the sheer number of cool sounds and textures that festoon every track." The Fort Worth Star-Telegram included the album on its list of the ten best of 1993, praising the "pure ugliness."

AllMusic's Keith Farley wrote that it "bursts out of the gate with the opener 'Dragnalus' and tears through a dozen songs of prime indie-grindcore, including 'Star Spangled Hell' and 'Pure Pain Sugar'."

== Legacy ==
The album received a lot more critical attention upon its re-release through the Rat Conspiracy box-set (which also included the follow-up New Plastic Ideas alongside other material recorded by the band during that time period) in 2014. Jason Heller of Pitchfork wrote that the album "lurches, twists, and turns in on itself, as if manifesting some perverse, extended metaphor for the feedback that laces nearly ever track" in his review of the box-set. The tracks “Valentine Card”, “Kantina”, and “Were, Are and Was or Is” were compared to the trilogy consisting of the tracks “The Wonder”, “Hyperstation”, and “Eliminator Jr.” off Sonic Youth's Daydream Nation. "Fake Train and New Plastic Ideas" he writes towards the end of the review, "hold important places in the history of 90s music, not to mention those of punk and indie as a whole [...] [T]hose two albums [...] transcend time, place, attitude, and even the sprawling continuum of influence. More than any other records of their generation, they embody a paradox that disaffected youth has been stabbing at since the advent of rock ’n’ roll: how it feels to be cocooned among strangers in utter alienation, yet stand as one." The A.V. Club, in an article suggesting that Unwound were one of the best bands of the '90s, noted "a layer of grunge grime on Unwound’s early records, conceived at the same time Nirvana was kicking around in Unwound’s backyard—and Trosper has admitted the inspiration. That might have gone both ways, though; listening to the strangled, wiry riffage of In Utero, it’s not hard to imagine it as a companion piece to Fake Train." Treble gave the album an 8.4 out of 10, writing that "no song on Fake Train is so abrasive as to be inaccessible, but it’s certainly one of the loudest and most chaotic of the band’s records, Trosper rarely singing in a register that isn’t a strained yelp. And he is, to his credit, particularly adept at yelping. There aren’t many moments on the album that allow breathing room [...] But by and large, the attractions are the direct, dissonant punk tracks like opener “Dragnalus,” which, in simple arrangements and progressions, show just how peculiar—and awesome—the Washingtonian band's take on post-hardcore really was."

== Track listing ==
No.	Title	Length
1.	"Dragnalus"	3:29
2.	"Lucky Acid"	1:43
3.	"Nervous Energy"	4:50
4.	"Valentine Card"	3:25
5.	"Kantina"	4:44
6.	"Were, Are and Was or Is"	5:45
7.	"Honourosis"	4:45
8.	"Pure Pain Sugar"	2:35
9.	"Gravity Slips"	1:44
10.	"Star Spangled Hell"	3:52
11.	"Ratbite"	2:44
12.	"Feeling$ Real"	5:15
Total length:		44:56

== Personnel ==
Unwound

- Justin Trosper – lead vocals, guitar
- Sara Lund – drums
- Vern Rumsey – bass guitar

Technical

- Steve Fisk – Producer, engineer, mixing
- Tim Green – Assistant engineer
- Stuart Hallerman – Engineer
- Slim Moon – assistant engineer
- Sean Smith – photography
