= List of Kill Rock Stars artists =

This is an overview of active and former artists signed to Kill Rock Stars.

== Active artists ==
- Big Joanie
- Brian Dunne
- Caleb Nichols
- Cindy Wilson
- Comet Gain
- Deerhoof
- Desert Mambas
- Erase Errata
- Cameron Esposito
- Foxx Bodies
- Elliott Fullam
- Gold Chains & Sue Cie
- Gravy Train!!!!
- Grrrl Gang
- Horse Feathers
- The Inflorescence
- Kate Nash
- Kinski (band)
- Lesibu Grand
- Logan Lynn
- Macromantics
- The Makers
- Mecca Normal
- MAITA
- Mi’ens
- Mika Miko
- Mikaela Davis
- Nedelle
- Thao Nguyen
- The Thermals
- Numbers
- The Old Haunts
- Anna Oxygen
- The Paper Chase
- Linda Perry
- Ron Gallo
- Ryan Cassata
- Santa Chiara
- Shoplifting
- Shy Child
- Slumber Party
- Shaylee
- Stereo Total
- Marnie Stern
- TEKE::TEKE
- Tele Novella
- They Shoot Horses, Don't They?
- Mary Timony
- Wimps

== Passive/defunct/alumnus artists ==
- Bangs
- Bikini Kill
- Boats
- Bratmobile
- C Average
- COMMANDO
- The Cribs
- Elliott Smith
- Free Kitten
- godheadSilo
- Gossip
- Harvey Danger
- Heroin
- Hovercraft
- Huggy Bear
- Jeff Hanson
- John Wilkes Booze
- Lungleg
- Mary Lou Lord
- Miranda July
- Mya Byrne
- Sleater-Kinney
- Team Dresch
- The Decemberists
- Unwound
- Wrangler Brutes
- Xiu Xiu

== See also ==
- Kill Rock Stars
- 5 Rue Christine
