= Challenge for a Civilized Society =

Studio album by Unwound
- Released: January 13, 1998
- Recorded: August 1–15, 1997
- Genres: Post-hardcore, noise rock, math rock, art punk, post-punk
- Length: 46:27
- Label: Kill Rock Stars
- Producer: Steve Fisk

Unwound chronology
Repetition (1996)	Challenge for a Civilized Society (1998)	A Single History: 1991–1997 (1999)

Challenge for a Civilized Society is the sixth studio album by the American post-hardcore band Unwound, released on January 13, 1998, by Kill Rock Stars. It was produced by Steve Fisk and recorded from August 1, 1997, to August 15, 1997, at John and Stu's in Seattle, Washington. The album received positive reviews from critics.

== Recording and release ==
Challenge for a Civilized Society was written in "a little more than a month" after Unwound took a break of a year and a half without writing any songs. The album was produced by the band's long-time collaborator, Steve Fisk, and recorded from August 1, 1997, to August 15, 1997, at John and Stu's in Seattle, Washington. According to singer and guitarist Justin Trosper, "With Challenge, we tried to expand our studio sound more than anything. The song structures are tighter and the album contains some of our best songs, but as a whole I think it's not our best album. It was less inspired than the others. Steve Fisk's production is really awesome. He does things that most other people would never think of. I think most producers are wankers with no ideas except commercial potential. Challenge just makes me want to make an album that goes even further out, to really question the whole process even more. What is a record? What is production? What's the audience? What's an artist, and so on?" An early title for the album was Empire., which would later be used by The Numero Group as the title of a compilation album containing both Challenge as well as Unwound's next and final album Leaves Turn Inside You.

The album was released on January 13, 1998 by the independent record label Kill Rock Stars, which also released the band's previous four albums. The album cover features a photo of Boston's stained-glass Mapparium. The album spent a total of 16 weeks on the CMJ Radio 200 Chart for 1998, peaking at No. 4. The band toured extensively in support of the album.

== Critical reception ==
Professional ratings
Review scores
Source	Rating
AllMusic	4/5 stars
The Boston Phoenix	3.5/4 stars
Kerrang!	3/5 stars
NME	7/10
Pitchfork	5.9/10 (1998); 7.8/10 (2015)
The Stranger	3/5 stars

Challenge for a Civilized Society received positive reviews from music critics. AllMusic reviewer Jason Ankeny stated that the album "is a study in extremes, as the group's noise assault reaches new pinnacles of raw abrasion." Similarly, NME observed that the album "uses the clenched rigour of emo-hardcore as a springboard rather than, as is so often the case, a constricting ideology. So tense little hate-songs like 'Laugh Track' and 'Mile Me Deaf' expand into tricksy, emotional guitar flurries plainly inspired by Sonic Youth, but, crucially, never lose their basic vicious power." Richard Martin, writing for CMJ New Music Monthly, highlighted the album's sinister mood, concluding "the tone on most of these ten tracks remains foreboding, but this consistent, inventive band rewards those willing to accept its Challenge."

== Track listing ==
All tracks are written by Justin Trosper, Vern Rumsey, and Sara Lund.

US Version
No.	Title	Length
1.	"Data"	3:33
2.	"Laugh Track"	3:13
3.	"Meet the Plastics"	3:12
4.	"The World Is Flat"	4:34
5.	"Sonata for Loudspeakers"	5:20
6.	"NO TECH!"	1:42
7.	"Side Effects of Being Tired"	9:00
8.	"Lifetime Achievement Award"	5:09
9.	"What Went Wrong"	8:34
10.	"XLNT" (Unlisted hidden track on US version)	2:05

UK and Japanese Versions
No.	Title	Length
1.	"Data"	3:33
2.	"Laugh Track"	3:13
3.	"Meet the Plastics"	3:12
4.	"The World Is Flat"	4:34
5.	"Sonata for Loudspeakers"	5:20
6.	"Mile Me Deaf"	2:23
7.	"NO TECH!"	1:42
8.	"Untitled 3" (Alternate title of Side Effects of Being Tired)	9:00
9.	"Lifetime Achievement Award"	5:09
10.	"Untitled 2" (Alternate title of What Went Wrong)	8:34
11.	"XLNT"	2:05
12.	"The Light at the End of the Tunnel is a Train"	10:11

== Personnel ==
Unwound

- Justin Trosper – lead vocals, guitar, saxophone, univox beatbox, synthesizer
- Vern Rumsey – bass guitar, lead vocals on "Side Effects of Being Tired/Untitled 3", EPS
- Sara Lund – drums, percussion

Additional musicians

- Steve Fisk – Ensoniq EPS, Harmonium, Hammond M-3
- Dave Carter – trumpet

Technical personnel

- Steve Fisk – production
- Kip Beelman – engineer
- Kevin Suggs – engineer
- Virginia Benson – photography
- Roger Seibel – mastering
