= New Plastic Ideas =

Studio album by Unwound
- Released: March 21, 1994
- Recorded: November 26–December 13, 1993
- Studio: Avast! (Seattle, Washington)
- Genres: Post-hardcore; noise rock
- Length: 39:43
- Label: Kill Rock Stars
- Producers: Steve Fisk; Unwound

Unwound chronology
Fake Train (1993)	New Plastic Ideas (1994)	The Future of What (1995)

New Plastic Ideas is the second studio album by the American post-hardcore band Unwound, released on March 21, 1994 by Kill Rock Stars.

== Background and recording ==
The album was recorded in between from November 26–28 and December 13, 1993 at Avast! Studios in Seattle, Washington. As pointed out in The Vinyl Factory's review for the album, New Plastic Ideas is a somewhat a step away from the feedback-ridden sound of its predecessor Fake Train and focuses more on melody and odd time signatures, although the band has stated that this was unintentional.

== Release and packaging ==
The album's title was once thought of a reference to the artist Piet Mondrian, however as explained by guitarist Justin Trosper, the name was simply made up on the spot.

The album was released on March 21, 1994 through independent label Kill Rock Stars, their second full-length for the label. The album was issued on compact disc, vinyl, and cassette formats, and the front cover photo is taken from the Philippe Entremont record Grieg: Concerto in A Minor for Piano and Orchestra. After being out-of-print for years, the album was made available on LP format again when it was included (with Fake Train) on the band's 2014 boxset Rat Conspiracy.

== Reception ==
Professional ratings
Review scores
Source	Rating
AllMusic	3/5 stars
Select	2/5 medals 3/5 medals
Sputnikmusic	4.0/5

Peter J. D'Angelo of AllMusic wrote that the album features "more coherently focused attempts at songwriting than their debut effort, and, on a whole, the Fugazi meets Sonic Youth in a dark alley musical theatrics really start to sound polished this time around." "Compared to the more technically adept work the band moved towards on later records," he writes, "New Plastic Ideas isn't their most groundbreaking, but in the scheme of things it sees the band move towards a darker and more note-oriented structure while still retaining the chugging dissonance that would continue to characterize them for their next few records." "Entirely Different Matters", "Hexenzsene" and "All Souls Day" were chosen as highlights. Ira Robbins and Michael Azzerad of Trouser Press wrote that the album "finds Unwound branching out into propulsive odd meters, a vastly bigger sound and even more traumatic contrasts between loud and soft, pulling the arty riffage into much tighter focus. There's even something resembling melody emerging on songs such as "Envelope," "Hexenzsene" and the downright Cure-ish instrumental "Abstraktions" — but the band's strength remains the art of noise, as in the staccato dissonance of "All Souls Day" and the way the roiling mass of distortion in "Usual Dosage" gives way to a lambent middle passage of tinkling, ringing tones."

However, Mark Morris of UK magazine Select was more negative, calling it a "dense and angry record" that made the "full-time alienated" band members seem like "the kind of people you avoid at parties." Months later, Siân Pattenden would review the album for Select yet again, this time slightly more positively. "A good, very listenable LP", she concluded, "but it's difficult to remember what you're hearing is supposed to be current."

== Legacy ==
Much like its predecessor, the album received a lot of critical attention upon its release through the 2014 box-set Rat Conspiracy. Pitchfork noted "a huge leap in articulation here, both in gesture and enunciation, from Fake Train." The song "Envelope" was called "one of Unwound’s most indelible songs, a study in inverted, charred-hearted near-pop—melody morphs into menace and is never resolved" while "Abstraktions" "veers down a harrowing, Side-Two-of-Joy-Division’s-Closer corridor." The review by writing that both it and its predecessor "hold important places in the history of 90s music, not to mention those of punk and indie as a whole." Delusions of Adequacy called it "a catalog highlight [...] one of the band's very best albums", singling out "All Soul's Day" as "one of the most punishing moments in the Unwound repertoire." Popmatters called it "a furious classic of a record. They addressed the frustration and isolation that so many indie bands of their ilk addressed, but few could transmogrify those feelings into a sound this crafted yet unruly, into a sound that could vacillate between the claustrophobia of being lonely and the sometimes scary open space of being alone." Treble rated the album an 8.9 out of 10, writing that "[t]here are four major factors here: Raw emotion, tidal waves of noise, head-banging hooks, and trippy instrumental transitions. It sounds like a lot to work with, but Unwound packs it in, graciously."

== Track listing ==
No.	Title	Length
1.	"Entirely Different Matters"	2:04
2.	"What Was Wound"	2:28
3.	"Envelope"	3:20
4.	"Hexenzsene"	4:34
5.	"Abstraktions"	7:11
6.	"All Souls Day"	3:12
7.	"Usual Dosage"	5:14
8.	"Arboretum"	5:00
9.	"Fiction Friction"	6:36
Total length:		39:43

== Personnel ==
Unwound

- Justin Trosper – lead vocals, guitar
- Sara Lund – drums
- Vern Rumsey – bass guitar

Technical

- Steve Fisk – producer, engineer
- Stuart Hallerman – engineer
