= The Future of What =

Studio album by Unwound
- Released: April 24, 1995
- Recorded: December 1994
- Studio: John and Stu's (Seattle, Washington)
- Genres: Post-hardcore, noise rock
- Length: 40:16 (LP); 59:18 (CD)
- Label: Kill Rock Stars
- Producer: Steve Fisk

Unwound chronology
New Plastic Ideas (1994)	The Future of What (1995)	Unwound (1995)

The Future of What is the third studio album by American post-hardcore band Unwound, released on April 24, 1995 by Kill Rock Stars.

== Recording and release ==
The Future of What was recorded in December 1994 at John and Stu's in Seattle, Washington and produced by Steve Fisk. The album cover features an illustration by Soviet Ukrainian constructivist artist Yakov Chernikhov.

== Critical reception ==
Professional ratings
Review scores
Source	Rating
AllMusic	4/5 stars
Sputnikmusic	3.8/5

In a favorable review, AllMusic's John Bush commented: "Taking their punk heritage from the Buzzcocks, Unwound write grinding, but tuneful songs. Most tracks rumble with a wandering bass while guitar fuzz coats the works. The vocals are intense, usually screamed. One atypical touch is the closer, a hypnotic quasi-ambient organ piece". In a mixed review, Jem Aswad of CMJ New Music Monthly praised the opening track, but criticized the album's consistency. The album's title inspired the name of Brooklyn synth band Future of What.

== Track listing ==
All music is composed by Unwound.

Side one
No.	Title	Length
1.	"New Energy"	1:57
2.	"Demolished"	2:49
3.	"Natural Disasters"	3:15
4.	"Re-Enact the Crime"	2:42
5.	"Equally Stupid"	3:06
6.	"Pardon My French"	1:30
7.	"Descension"	4:21

Side two
No.	Title	Length
8.	"Accidents on Purpose"	1:55
9.	"Petals Like Bricks"	2:22
10.	"Vern's Answer to the Masses"	0:39
11.	"Here Come the Dogs"	2:06
12.	"Disappoint"	5:18
13.	"Swan"	8:09
Total length:		40:16

CD bonus tracks
No.	Title	Length
14.	"Full Explanation of Answer"	5:24
15.	"Excuse Me..."	4:02
16.	"...But Pardon..."	2:42
17.	"...My French"	6:53
Total length:		59:18

== Personnel ==
=== Unwound ===
- Justin Trosper – Vocals, guitar
- Vern Rumsey – Bass
- Sara Lund – Drums

=== Additional musicians ===
- Steve Fisk – Optigan

=== Technical Personnel ===
- Steve Fisk – Producer
- John Goodmanson – Engineer
- Kathi Wilcox – Photography
