= Survival Knife (band) =

- Origin: Tumwater/Olympia, Washington, U.S.
- Genres: Post-hardcore
- Years active: 2011–2015
- Label: Sub Pop
- Spinoff of: Unwound
- Members: Justin Trosper; Brandt Sandeno; Kris Cunningham; Meg Cunningham

Survival Knife was an American post-hardcore band, which formed in early 2011. They played their first show in March 2012. The band has played shows through the Pacific Northwest with such groups as METZ, Bitch Magnet, Mosquito Hawk, Wimps, Kinski, and Hungry Ghost. They completed a west coast tour in April 2013 supporting Modest Mouse. Two members of Survival Knife, Justin Trosper and Brandt Sandeno, were members of the post-hardcore band Unwound that broke up in 2002.

They released their first single, "Traces of Me" on March 5, 2013, on the US label Sub Pop.

They released their debut album, Loose Power on April 30, 2014, on the US label Glacial Pace.

== Discography ==
"Traces of Me"

- Released: March 5, 2013
- Label: Sub pop
- Tracks: "Traces of Me" / "Name That Tune"

"Divine Mob"

- Released: October 15, 2013
- Format: 7 inch
- Label: Kill Rock Stars
- Tracks: "Divine Mob" / "Name That Tune"
