= Unwound (disambiguation) =

Unwound are an American post-hardcore band.

Unwound may also refer to:

- "Unwound" (song), a 1981 song by George Strait
- Unwound (Unwound album), 1995
- Unwound (Tim Berne album), 1996
