= Bangs (band) =

American punk rock/riot grrrl band

- Origin: Olympia, Washington, United States
- Genres: Punk rock; riot grrrl
- Years active: 1997–2004; 2010
- Labels: Kill Rock Stars
- Past members: Maggie Vail; Sarah Utter; Peter David Connelly; Heather Dunn; Jesse Fox; Kyle Ermatinger

Bangs (often erroneously referred to as the Bangs) was an American punk rock and riot grrrl band from Olympia, Washington.

== Career ==
=== Formation ===
The band was formed in 1997 by the guitarist Sarah Utter, after recruiting her high-school friend Jesse Fox on drums and Maggie Vail. Vail had to learn how to play bass guitar to be in the band, as the only instruments she played before were drums, guitar, cello and clarinet.

=== Touring ===
Bangs toured with and/or played shows with bands including Sleater-Kinney, the Gossip, Unwound, Blonde Redhead, The Makers, The Donnas, Shannon Wright, Murder City Devils and Karp. Vail also played bass guitar in Frenchie and the German Girls, and sang backing vocals in the famous party-band Gene Defcon. Utter played in one of the last incarnations of Witchypoo, as well as Plastique.

Fox left the band after a long U.S. tour, and Bangs went through a succession of drummers (Heather Dunn, Kyle Ermatinger) before settling with Olympia's Peter David Connelly. They recorded their last EP, Call and Response, in a frigidly cold farmhouse basement with the engineer Justin Trosper of Unwound.

Although the band had associations with the riot grrrl movement (Vail's sister is Bikini Kill's Tobi Vail), Bangs did not regard itself as a riot grrrl band and preferred the term "rock band", crediting The Go-Go's, The Ramones, and Cheap Trick as inspirations. All of the band's releases were on Kill Rock Stars except for one single, released on Olympia label Ten-In-One Records. They toured the United States extensively, and also played shows in England, Scotland, Australia and New Zealand, where they were featured on the country's national news.

=== Break up and reunion ===
Bangs broke up in September 2004 after Utter moved to Los Angeles. Their last show was at Olympia's Eagles Hall as part of Kill Rock Stars' 'Yeah! Fest!'. Vail has since relocated to Portland, Oregon, where she plays in the bands Romancing and Leti Angel. Peter David still lives in Olympia and plays in The Mona Reels as well as other groups such as The November Witch, Tumwater Video and The Devon Williams Band. Utter has since moved back to the northwest and spends her time painting and playing bass guitar with Craig Extine and Kris Cunningham in the band Western Hymn.

In July 2010, the band reunited for four shows. One warm up gig in Olympia was followed by three shows (Portland, Olympia, and Seattle) benefiting their friend, Natalie Cox's, cancer fund.

== Discography ==
=== Studio albums ===
- Tiger Beat (1998)
- Sweet Revenge (2000)

=== Singles and EPS ===
- Maggie the Cat, 7", 1998, Ten in One
- Mailorder Freaks Singles Club 7", 1999, Kill Rock Stars
- Call and Response, EP, 2002

=== Compilation appearances ===
- Turbo's Tunes
- Fields And Streams, 2 CD compilation, (Kill Rock Stars 2002)
- Mollie's Mix
