= Repetition (Unwound album) =

Studio album by Unwound
- Released: April 9, 1996
- Recorded: January 1996
- Studio: John and Stu's (Seattle, Washington)
- Genres: Post-hardcore; punk rock; post-punk; hardcore punk
- Length: 44:56
- Label: Kill Rock Stars
- Producers: Steve Fisk; John Goodmanson

Unwound chronology
Unwound (1995)	Repetition (1996)	Challenge for a Civilized Society (1998)

Singles from Repetition
- 1. "Corpse Pose" Released: March 11, 1996

Repetition is the fifth studio album by American post-hardcore band Unwound, released on April 9, 1996 by Kill Rock Stars. The album has been hailed as a masterpiece among those in the punk rock scene.

== Recording and release ==
Repetition was recorded in January 1996 at John and Stu's Place in Seattle, Washington and produced by Steve Fisk and John Goodmanson. The band sought a more "studio-oriented" approach than their previous albums and experimented with new sounds, including the use of keyboards. According to Justin Trosper, "Repetition" was chosen as the album's title because, "I like that word. It sort of describes a lot of things. People have said that our music is repetitious. So I thought it would be funny if we called our record that. Plus it's our fifth record, so we're like repeating things over and over" The song "Corpse Pose" was released as a single on March 11, 1996, featuring an outtake, "Everything Is Weird", as the B-side.

== Critical reception ==
Professional ratings
Review scores
Source	Rating
AllMusic	4.5/5 stars
The Boston Phoenix	3/4 stars

The album received positive reviews from music critics. AllMusic reviewer Blake Butler described Repetition as the band's "most sleek and mood-encompassing album." Megan McCarthy of CMJ New Music Monthly opined that the album features "a sound that is polished and paced, tethering its bass-driven ferocity to tingling melodies", but also admitted that some songs such as "Fingernails on a Chalkboard" are too repetitious. Matt Ashare, writing for Boston Phoenix, stated that Repetition "mixes in a dub-heavy instrumental reminiscent of early PiL ('Sensible'), a high-pitched feedback frenzy buoyed by a stark funk backbeat ('Fingernails on a Chalkboard') that recalls Gang of Four's 'Anthrax', elegant Tom Verlaine-style guitar lines, and skronk punctuated by synth noise that harks back to the heyday of Captain Beefheart ('Corpse Pose'). The likes of Rancid and Green Day pale in comparison to the challenge of Unwound: this is the real punk rock."

== Track listing ==
All music is composed by Unwound.

No.	Title	Length
1.	"Message Received"	3:05
2.	"Corpse Pose"	3:05
3.	"Unauthorized Autobiography"	2:47
4.	"Lowest Common Denominator"	4:31
5.	"Sensible"	3:00
6.	"Lady Elect"	5:37
7.	"Fingernails on a Chalkboard"	4:56
8.	"Murder Movies"	1:48
9.	"Next Exit"	4:30
10.	"Devoid"	3:13
11.	"Go to Dallas and Take a Left"	4:13
12.	"For Your Entertainment"	5:39
Total length:		44:56

== Personnel ==
Unwound

- Justin Trosper – Guitar, vocals
- Sara Lund – Drums
- Vernon Rumsey – Bass

Technical

- Steve Fisk – Producer, additional keyboards
- John Goodmanson – Engineer, co-producer
- Jason Funk – Photography
