= Fitz of Depression =

American punk rock band

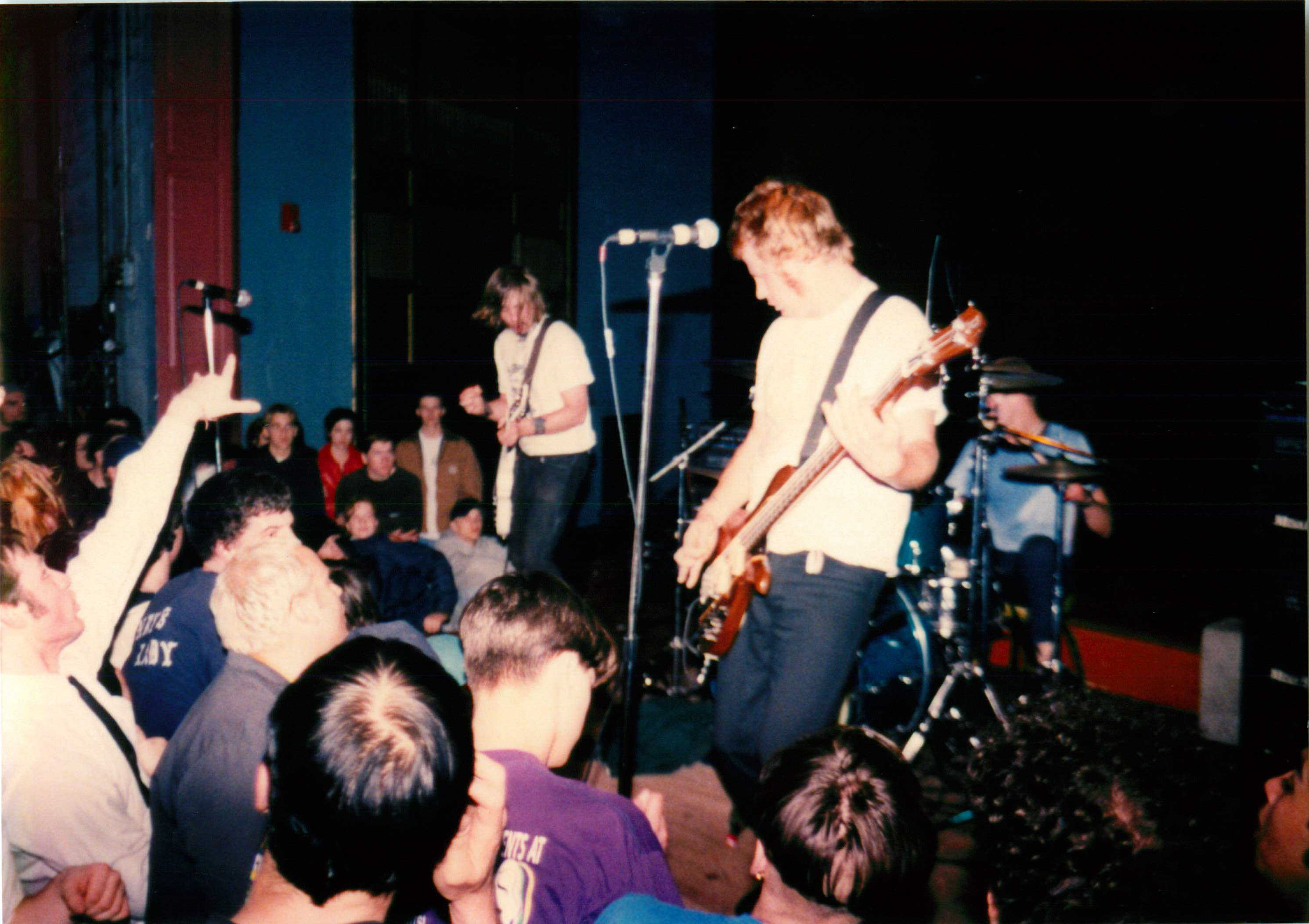

Background information
- Origin: Olympia, Washington, United States
- Genre: Punk rock
- Years active: 1987–1997, 2000, 2002-2019
- Labels: Mumble Something, Meat, Negative Feedback, K, Kill Rock Stars
- Past members: Mikey Dees; Craig Becker; Jim Koontz; Ryan von Bargen; Justin Warren; Brian Sparhawk; Jerry Zeigler; Vern Rumsey; Tony Slug

Fitz of Depression was an American punk rock band from Olympia, Washington, formed in 1987. The band released three albums before splitting up in 1997. There were brief reunion tours in 2000 and 2002. The band continued to play, particularly in the Northwestern United States, with occasional west coast tours until the death of founding member and singer/guitarist Mike Dees.

== History ==
Formed in Olympia in 1988, the band's original lineup consisted of Mike Dees (Mikey Dees vocals, guitar), Jim Koontz (bass guitar), and Craig Becker (drums). They began playing local venues in the Olympia area. This lineup recorded an eight track EP, released on the Mumble Something label. Koontz left the band, to be replaced by Ryan Von Bargen.

The band's next release was "The Awakening", a single on the Meat label released in January 1991. A benefit concert was held in April 1991 to help Dees pay fines for traffic violations and avoid jail, with the band joined on stage by Bikini Kill and Nirvana and the concert filmed for the documentary film Hype!. Von Bargen was replaced by Justin Warren.

A self-titled debut album, which had been recorded in 1991, was the band's last release on Meat, subsequently signing with K Records, for whom they debuted with the July 1994 album Let's Give It a Twist (released in the UK the following year on Fire Records). Warren (who later joined Quitters, Inc.) had himself been replaced by Brian Sparhawk in 1993. In April 1995, while touring the UK, the band recorded a session for John Peel's BBC Radio 1 show, at the Maida Vale BBC studios in London.

The band's third and final album, Swing, was released in April 1996. Maximum Rocknroll dubbed it a "smashing new release by the undisputed heavyweights of hard pop," before noting that Fitz of Depression were "by far, one of the best bands to emerge from the grunge capital of the world." Option also praised Swing, observing that "the Fitz ride in, sounding like some long-forgotten British invasion. Not the pop of Oasis and Blur, but instead the vintage-sounding aggression of the pre-digital Clash and Stiff Little Fingers."

The band signed to Warner Bros., but split up in 1997 before any releases for the company. They reunited briefly in 2000 to tour with Bad Brains (at the time going by the name Soul Brains due to issues with their record label), but split again before the tour's completion. They reunited again in 2002 for some live shows and played with Slug, Von Bargen and Zeigler until Mike's passing in 2019.

Sparhawk joined Two Ton Boa, and then joined the Resident Kings in 2011. Craig Becker went on to play with The Viles, Deadbeat Hearts and the Natrons.

On July 23, 2018, the band announced via Facebook that they plan to reform and record a new record, followed by a European tour in the Spring of 2019.

On 4 June 2019, Mikey Dees was found dead in his home of an apparent heart attack suffered in his sleep. He was 48.

In 2022, Von Bargen released the EPILOGUE E.P. The tracks were recorded in July of 2008 by Andrew Worzella in Olympia, WA. The recording of Dees, Von Bargen and Zeigler contained songs with unfinished vocal tracks which were completed in October of 2019 by Chris Smith, formerly of the Olympia band KARP. After Mikey's passing, Jack Endino offered to mix and master the recording, making the vinyl release possible.

== Musical style ==
The band's sound has been characterized as hardcore punk, 'metal-punk', or 'power punk'.

== Discography ==
=== Albums ===
- Fitz of Depression (1993), Meat - 10-inch LP
- Let's Give It a Twist (1994), K
- Swing (1996), K

=== EPs ===
- Fitz of Depression, Mumble Something - 7-inch EP
- Pigs are People Too (1995), Negative Feedback
- Peel Sessions - BBC Radio One (2003), Very Necessary
- EPILOGUE E.P (2022)

=== Singles ===
- "The Awakening" (1991), Meat
- "Pissbutt" (1992), Blatant
- "Take It Away"/"Jenny/867-5309" (1993), Negative Feedback
- "Lie" (1994), K
- Spawning Monsters: "See Me, Hear Me"/"Miracle Man" (1995), Fire
- "Young and Free" (1995), Fire
- "I'm the Man" (1995), Yo Yo
- "Seemingly Vague" (1996), Kill Rock Stars
