= The Hissyfits =

American band

- Origin: Brooklyn, New York
- Genre: Punk pop
- Years active: 1996–2005
- Labels: Top Quality Rock and Roll, Sounds of Subterrania
- Members: Holly "Princess" Jacobs, Hallie Bullet, Sivan Harlap, Karen Kanan Correa
- Past members: Fon-Lin, P-Girl, Suzi Blade, "Jumpin Jim" Joanos
- Website: hissyfitsnyc.com

The Hissyfits were a punk pop band from Brooklyn, New York, formed in 1996.

== History ==
The Hissyfits was founded in 1996 by guitarist Princess (real name Holly Jacobs) and bassist Suzi Blade (real name Lalena Fisher); the two shared songwriting and singing roles. With rotating drummers, they released two cassette EPs, The Hissyfits and Kitty-Cat Smack. After drummer P-Girl (real name Portia Sabin) joined the band in 1998, they recorded and released a 7-inch vinyl EP called All Dolled Up (Mutant Pop Records). The single "Something Wrong" from this record was called "perfect" by Greil Marcus in the September 1999 issue of Interview magazine. That same year, the trio released the vinyl EP Wish You Were Here; and Fisher departed the band to form The Color Guard. With Fon-Lin Nyeu now on bass, the band played regularly on national tours before releasing their first full-length album, Letters from Frank, in 2001. The band subsequently played at Ladyfest in 2002, and on the Warped Tour. Soon afterward, the band's lineup changed, with Fon-Lin and P-Girl both leaving to return to college. They were subsequently replaced by Hallie Bulleit (bass), Sivan Harlap (drums), and Karen Kanan Correa (viola). They went on indefinite hiatus in 2005.

== Critical reception ==
Greil Marcus named the Hissyfits' song "Baby" as #5 on his "Real Life Rock Top 10" column for November 12, 2001. His column described the song as follows: "Standing out on a disappointing album from Brooklyn’s sunniest, trashiest, most worried guitar-based rave-up girl group, a floater: A small voice that takes on deeper textures with every phrase, a simple pulse that goes in circles even as it rushes toward the finish line." The Austin Chronicle's Raoul Hernandez described the band's style as "Go-Go's if they were from NYC and belonged on the Bay Area's Lookout! label, from whence came the Donnas."

== Discography ==
- All Dolled Up (Mutant Pop Records EP, 1998)
- Wish You Were Here (Sounds of Subterrania EP, 1999)
- Letters from Frank (Top Quality Rock and Roll, 2001)
- Goodbye (Princess and the Pea Music, 2024)
