= A Single History: 1991–1997 =

Compilation album by Unwound
- Released: September 14, 1999
- Recorded: December 1991–August 1997
- Genre: Post-hardcore
- Length: 58:21
- Label: Kill Rock Stars

Unwound chronology
Challenge for a Civilized Society (1998)	A Single History: 1991–1997 (1999)	Leaves Turn Inside You (2001)

Professional ratings
Review scores
Source	Rating
Allmusic	3/5 stars

A Single History: 1991–1997 is a compilation album by Unwound released on Kill Rock Stars. It contains tracks previously released on various 7-inch singles and multiple-artist compilations. "Crab Nebula" and "Stumbling Block" originally appeared on the band's 1991 demo tape. The fourth song is a reference to the U.S. government's secret MKUltra brainwashing program. The "Negated"/ "Said Serial"/ "Census" 7-inch was the first-ever release on Troubleman Unlimited Records. "Plight" is a cover of a Minutemen song, from the tribute album Our Band Could Be Your Life. "Seen Not Heard" is from a split 7-inch with Steel Pole Bath Tub; the song comes from the Repetition album sessions. Following an extended drum and bass-style intro, "The Light At The End..." features odd vocal snippets from a man trying to persuade some band to make upbeat, "tribal-sounding" aerobics music.

According to a Kill Rock Stars Q&A from 1999, the cover art is a composite of photos taken by drummer Sara Lund on the band's overseas tours. The top photo is of St. Mark's Basilica in Venice; "the train in the middle is from Japan, and the nuns on the bottom are from a religious procession we witnessed in Trani, Italy."

== Track listing ==
All tracks are written by Unwound, unless noted otherwise.

No.	Title	Writer(s)	Original release	Length
1.	"Mile Me Deaf"		"The Light at the End of the Tunnel is a Train", 1997	2:20
2.	"Broken E-Strings"		"Jabberjaw No.1", 1994	3:11
3.	"Totality"		"MK Ultra/Totality", 1994	3:07
4.	"MK Ultra"		"MK Ultra/Totality", 1994	4:48
5.	"Seen Not Heard"		Split with Steel Pole Bath Tub, 1996	3:41
6.	"Caterpillar"		"Caterpillar/Miserific Condition/Love & Fear", 1992	1:58
7.	"Miserific Condition"		"Caterpillar/Miserific Condition/Love & Fear", 1992	1:57
8.	"Everything Is Weird"		"Corpse Pose/Everything Is Weird", 1996	2:52
9.	"Negated"		"Negated/Said Serial/Census", 1994	4:36
10.	"Said Serial"		"Negated/Said Serial/Census", 1994	2:23
11.	"Census"		"Negated/Said Serial/Census", 1994	1:50
12.	"Plight"	D. Boon, Mike Watt	Our Life Could Be Your Band, Minutemen tribute album	1:56
13.	"Stumbling Block"		Demo, 1991	2:01
14.	"Eternalux"		A Day in the Park comp., 1994	4:58
15.	"New Radio Hit"		The Smitten Love Song Comp., 1994	2:21
16.	"The Light at the End of the Tunnel is a Train"		The Light at the End of the Tunnel is a Train, 1997	10:10
17.	"Crab Nebula"		Demo, 1991	4:06
Total length:				58:21

== Credits ==
- Steve Fisk - keyboards, production on 1-8, 14, 16
- Dustin the Roadie - trombone on 10, 11, spoken word on 12
- Sara Lund - cover art
- Kip Beelman - recording engineer for 1, 16
- Stuart Hollerman - recording engineer for 2-7, 14
- John Goodmanson - recording engineer for 8
- Tim Green - recording engineer for 9-12, 15
- Pat Maley - recording engineer for 13, 17
