= Rat Conspiracy =

2014 compilation album by Unwound

Compilation album by Unwound
- Released: March 18, 2014
- Genre: Post-hardcore
- Length: 2:05:08
- Label: The Numero Group

Unwound chronology
Kid Is Gone (2013)	Rat Conspiracy (2014)	No Energy (2014)

Rat Conspiracy is a compilation of recordings by the post-hardcore band Unwound. It features the Fake Train and New Plastic Ideas albums along with an extra disc of live recordings, songs from singles, and demos from the recording sessions of their respective albums. It was released on March 18, 2014, by The Numero Group as the second of a four-album reissue series.

== History ==
Unwound formed in 1988 and broke up in 2002. In 2013, it was announced that Chicago-based archival record label The Numero Group were going to remaster and reissue the band's full discography, its centerpiece being four boxsets separated by albums.

The title of the boxset was the original title for Fake Train. One version of Rat Conspiracy included an extra disc of demos of Fake Train songs, entitled Faked Train. It was later released on its own in 2023.

== Reception ==
Pitchfork gave the album a 9.1 and named it Best New Reissue, saying that "More than any records of their generation, they embody a paradox that disaffected youth has been stabbing at since the advent of rock 'n' roll: how it feels to be cocooned among strangers in utter alienation, yet stand as one". Treble Zine said that "These songs aren't simply high on volume, they're tense in a way that simple punk aggression could never properly convey".

Impose Magazine said that "Unwound should be remembered, so the story goes, for their unwillingness to bend to commercial influence. On the one hand, perhaps this story was designed to sell me a 40 dollar boxset. On the other, the music speaks for itself—and the music preserved on Rat Conspiracy speaks volumes". The Quietus said that "if nothing else, this two-hour compendium of righteous, often superlative noise demonstrates that they could also cater to dancin' feet, and ears looking to be bled like radiators".

== Tracklisting ==
=== Fake Train ===
All tracks are written by Trosper, Rumsey, and Lund.

No.	Title	Length
1.	"Dragnalus"	3:30
2.	"Lucky Acid"	1:41
3.	"Nervous Energy"	4:49
4.	"Valentine Card"	3:25
5.	"Kantina"	4:44
6.	"Were, Are And Was Or Is"	5:44
7.	"Honourosis"	4:45
8.	"Pure Pain Sugar"	2:35
9.	"Gravity Slips"	1:44
10.	"Star Spangled Hell"	3:50
11.	"Ratbite"	2:41
12.	"Feeling$ Real"	5:14
Total length:		44:43

=== New Plastic Ideas ===
No.	Title	Length
1.	"Entirely Different Matters"	2:03
2.	"What Was Wound"	2:29
3.	"Envelope"	3:20
4.	"Hexenszene"	4:34
5.	"Abstraktions"	7:10
6.	"All Soul's Day"	3:12
7.	"Usual Dosage"	5:13
8.	"Arboretum"	4:55
9.	"Fiction Friction"	6:38
Total length:		39:39

=== Rat Conspiracy ===
No.	Title	Writer(s)	Length
1.	"Broken E-Strings"		3:11
2.	"Totality"		3:05
3.	"Mkultra"		4:46
4.	"Eternalux"		4:56
5.	"Unsympathetica"		4:23
6.	"Negated"		4:38
7.	"Said Serial"		2:27
8.	"Census"		1:49
9.	"Plight"	Boon, Watt	1:56
10.	"Untitled 1"		2:06
11.	"Untitled 2"		7:36
Total length:			42:08

== Credits ==
Derived from liner notes.

- Justin Trosper - vocals, guitar, writer
- Vern Rumsey - bass, writer
- Sara Lund - drums, writer
- Maria Rice - mastering engineer
- Jeff Lipton - mastering engineer
- Henry H. Owings - design
- Judson Picco - editor
- Julia Dratel - transcriber
- D. Boon - writer ("Plight")
- Mike Watt - writer ("Plight")
