= The Color Guard =

American rock band

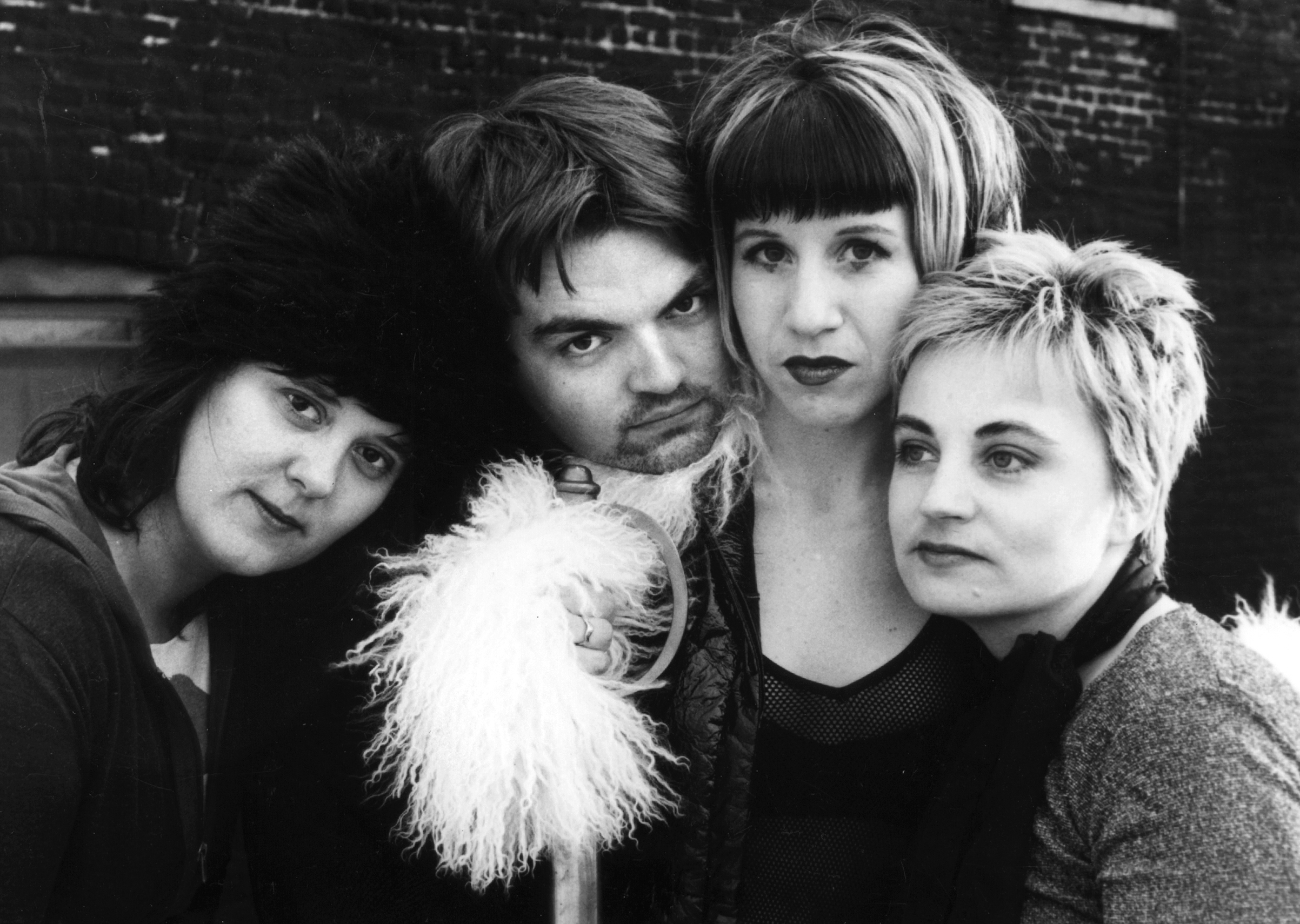

Background information
- Origin: New York City
- Genres: Indie rock, art rock, goth, riot grrl, punk rock
- Years active: 2000–2007
- Past members: Lalena Fisher, Jeanne Gilliland, Josh Zisman, Nina57, Valerie Massimi, Chris Lee, Jake Alrich, Caryn Havlik, Norie Manigault, Joe Salvati
- Website: www.thecolorguard.com

The Color Guard were a rock band from New York City from 2000 to 2007. Their sound combines heavy guitars with vocal harmonies, and they have been described as indie pop, art rock, goth rock, garage rock and psychedelic. Depending on the album, the band has been compared to The Darkness, Evanescence, Liz Phair, The Breeders, Veruca Salt, Sleater-Kinney, The Raincoats, and The Au Pairs.

== Biography ==
Visual artist Lalena Fisher formed The Color Guard after leaving her first New York band The Hissyfits in 1999. Taking up guitar after having started as a bassist and songwriter, Fisher met fellow guitarist Valerie Massimi at Fisher's final Hissyfits show. Massimi introduced her to bassist Jeanne Gilliland, who remained in the band with Fisher through all four of their releases. Chris Lee joined on drums.

The four-woman band released a five-song, self-titled EP recorded by Louie Lino, in 2000. The Village Voice review stated, “‘Not My Valentine’ (is) the first and best song on the excellently relevant Color Guard EP ... I wish I'd had this song during my most recent breakup.” The band’s first full-length album, Speech for Heated Hearts of 2002, received a highlighted “Listen 2 This” review in Entertainment Weekly: “Part of a new wave of indie bands slogging their gear up and down New York City’s streets, The Color Guard are three women—and a guy, the drummer—who riff away on frazzled-sounding guitars while engaging in reach-for-the-sky counterpoint harmonies.” By this time, Nina57 served as the lead guitarist and Jake Alrich played drums, and the album was recorded by Hillary Johnson. In 2004 the band moved into more moody, experimental territory with their second album, Dark Pop. PopMatters described it in this way: “They write unabashed pop songs—or at least follow traditional pop song structure—then dress those songs up in dark, rich material.” This album was recorded by Louie Lino with Josh Zisman on guitar, and three different drummers: Jake Alrich, Caryn Havlik, and Norie Manigault. The band recorded their final release, an EP-DVD set called Cornucopia in 2007, with Joe Salvati on drums.

== Discography ==
- The Color Guard (Suziblade Music EP, 2000)
- Speech for Heated Hearts (Suziblade Music, 2002)
- Dark Pop (Suziblade Music, 2004)
- Cornucopia (Suziblade Music, EP/DVD 2007)
