= Portia Sabin =

Portia Sabin is President of the Music Business Association (Music Biz), a not-for-profit trade association that seeks to promote sustained financial growth and bolster inclusion & equity efforts in all areas of the global music business. Sabin previously served as president of the independent record label Kill Rock Stars, and has been involved in the leadership of music industry associations American Association of Independent Music (A2IM) and World Independent Network (WIN).

== Career ==
While getting her Ph.D. in Anthropology & Education from Columbia University, Sabin played drums in several NYC bands before moving to Olympia, Washington, to research her dissertation. She began working at Kill Rock Stars in 2000 and started her own artist management company, Shotclock Management, in 2001. From 2005 through March 2008 Sabin managed dance/punk band The Gossip. In 2006 Sabin left her postdoctoral fellowship at the University of Washington to run Kill Rock Stars. She has been on the board of the American Association of Independent Music (A2IM) since 2011, and continues as a board member of World Independent Network (WIN). In 2011-12 Sabin chaired the organizing committee of A2IM's inaugural Libera Awards, an awards show celebrating independent labels and artists.

As the president of Kill Rock Stars, Sabin is credited with integrating the artists from sister experimental label 5 Rue Christine into the Kill Rock Stars roster and focusing more on artist development. Companies such as CD Baby have shared her advice to their touring musicians to help them appeal to labels. In 2011, Sabin relocated the company from Lacey, Washington, to the Olympic Mills Commerce Center in Portland, Oregon. Under Sabin's direction, in 2012 Kill Rock Stars began releasing albums from prominent stand-up comedians alongside its musical releases and Sabin has stated "I really feel like comedy is the new punk rock".

In 2017, Sabin was elected to a three-year term on the board of A2IM.

On August 8, 2019, it was announced Sabin would succeed James Donio as president of Music Biz effective September 3, 2019. Joining shortly before the start of the COVID-19 pandemic, Sabin led the Association to pivot its annual Music Biz Conference programming into more than 70 virtual events across 18 months, to help foster education, networking and community for the global music business at a time where gathering in-person was not possible.

Sabin's tenure with Music Biz has also seen the organization bolster its efforts to support diversity, equity and inclusion for historically marginalized communities. As of May 2023, the executives which comprise the Music Biz's Board of Directors are more than 50% female, and 60% are BIPOC. For her efforts since taking the helm at Music Biz, Sabin was named to Billboard's 2021 Change Agents and 2022 & 2023 Women in Music lists.

Sabin is married to Kill Rock Stars’ founder Slim Moon.
