= Unwound (Unwound album) =

1995 album by Unwound

Studio album by Unwound
- Released: August 28, 1995
- Recorded: May 1992
- Studios: Avast Studio, Seattle
- Genres: Post-hardcore; noise rock; emocore
- Length: 27:35
- Labels: Honey Bear (CD); Punk In My Vitamins (LP); The Numero Group (reissue)
- Producers: Steve Fisk, Stuart Hallerman

Unwound chronology
The Future of What (1995)	Unwound (1995)	Repetition (1996)

Professional ratings
Review scores
Source	Rating
AllMusic	3/5 stars

Unwound is the fourth album by the American post-hardcore band Unwound, released on August 28, 1995. It was the first album recorded by the band and was originally intended to be their debut, but was eventually pushed back three years later after the release of The Future of What. Trouser Press called the album "one of their best".

== Background and Recording ==
Recorded in May 1992, Unwound wasn't released until August 1995, at which point Unwound had already recorded and released three other albums on Kill Rock Stars. "Kandy Korn Rituals" and "Against" (the latter of which is unlisted and attached to "Kandy Korn Rituals" on this album) were previously released on a 7" by Kill Rock Stars in 1992, along with a live song called "Hating in D". "You Bite My Tongue", "Understand & Forget" and "Kid Is Gone" were released as a self-titled 7" by Gravity Records in 1993. The other songs on this album were previously unreleased. Drummer Brandt Sandeno quit before the mixing was completed, thus the album was shelved until 1995 when the band decided "it was good" and finished the mixing. The vinyl version was released on Vern Rumsey's Punk In My Vitamins label.

The album became out-of-print for many years until it was reissued in the vinyl boxset Kid Is Gone in 2013 by The Numero Group. It was then made available on its own outside of the boxset.

== Track listing ==
No.	Title	Length
1.	"Antifreeze"	1:51
2.	"Rising Blood"	3:02
3.	"Understand & Forget"	2:12
4.	"Fingertips"	2:41
5.	"You Bite My Tongue"	2:07
6.	"Stuck in the Middle of Nowhere Again"	3:34
7.	"Warmth"	2:13
8.	"Prospect"	2:30
9.	"Kid Is Gone" (Labeled "Kid Is Gone (Chant of Vengeance)" on Kid Is Gone)	2:11
10.	"Kandy Korn Rituals/Against" ("Against" is unlisted on back cover)	5:20
Total length:		27:35

Kid Is Gone bonus tracks
No.	Title	Length
11.	"Against"	2:53
12.	"I'd Die to Know You"	1:43
13.	"Sugarfit"	2:07
Total length:		31:25

== Personnel ==
- Justin Trosper - Vocals, Guitar
- Vern Rumsey - Bass
- Brandt Sandeno - Drums
- Jane Laughlin - Photography
- Steve Fisk - Recording, mixing
- Stuart Hallerman - Recording
