= Kid Is Gone =

Compilation album by Unwound
- Released: September 17, 2013
- Recorded: July 1991 ― May 1992
- Label: Numero

Unwound chronology
Leaves Turn Inside You (2001)	Kid Is Gone (2013)	Rat Conspiracy (2014)

Professional ratings
Review scores
Source	Rating
AllMusic	4/5 stars
Pitchfork	8.0/10
Popmatters	7/10

Kid Is Gone is the third compilation by the band Unwound and the first to be released by The Numero Group. It documents early demos, singles, live recordings, and the material that made up their first-recorded (but fourth-released) album Unwound (1995) and their 1991 demo. It was released September 17, 2013 as the first part of a four-part compilation series. A limited edition version of the compilation featured 7/26/2001, a "reunion" of the original formation and playing only songs from the era.

== Reception ==
Pitchfork gave the album an 8 and said that "Unwound were a band who changed a lot during their time together, but never lost the plot; while there is this cohesion, the shifts also make more sense, and ultimately will mean more, if these boxes are experienced in something closer to "real time." This was a real band, a group of friends who played music because they wanted to play music. A band with ideals when ideals were about what you did in private, and not just about playing a character in the press".

Fred Thomas from AllMusic gave the album a 4/5 and said "Kid Is Gone begins to unravel Unwound's holy noise, still just as mysterious and captivating as it was nearly 20 years prior".

== Tracklisting ==
Caterpillar

All tracks are written by Unwound.

No.	Title	Length
1.	"Bionic"	2:47
2.	"LD-50"	3:05
3.	"Lying At Best"	3:24
4.	"Stumbling Block"	1:59
5.	"While You're Ahead"	3:24
6.	"Rubber Band Heart"	3:32
7.	"Crab Nebula"	3:50
8.	"Caterpillar"	1:57
9.	"Miserific Condition"	1:56
10.	"Love And Fear"	7:12
11.	"You Speak Jealousy"	3:11

Unwound

No.	Title	Length
1.	"Antifreeze"	1:50
2.	"Rising Blood"	3:01
3.	"Understand & Forget"	2:10
4.	"Fingertips"	2:40
5.	"You Bite My Tongue"	2:04
6.	"Stuck in the Middle of Nowhere Again"	3:32
7.	"Warmth"	2:10
8.	"Prospect"	2:28
9.	"Kid Is Gone"	2:10
10.	"Kandy Korn Rituals"	2:26
11.	"Against"	2:53
12.	"I'd Die To Know You"	1:43
13.	"Sugarfit"	2:07

Chant of Vengeance

Side one of this record was recorded at KAOS, while side two was recorded live in "Damon's basement".

No.	Title	Length
1.	"Understand & Forget"	2:13
2.	"Miserific Condition"	1:51
3.	"Against"	1:59
4.	"Ape Skins"	3:37
5.	"Awkward"	8:15
6.	"Antifreeze"	2:32
7.	"Rising Blood"	3:19
8.	"Prospect"	4:05
9.	"Stuck in the Middle of Nowhere Again"	2:41
10.	"Hating in D"	7:17
