= Wimps (band) =

American punk rock band

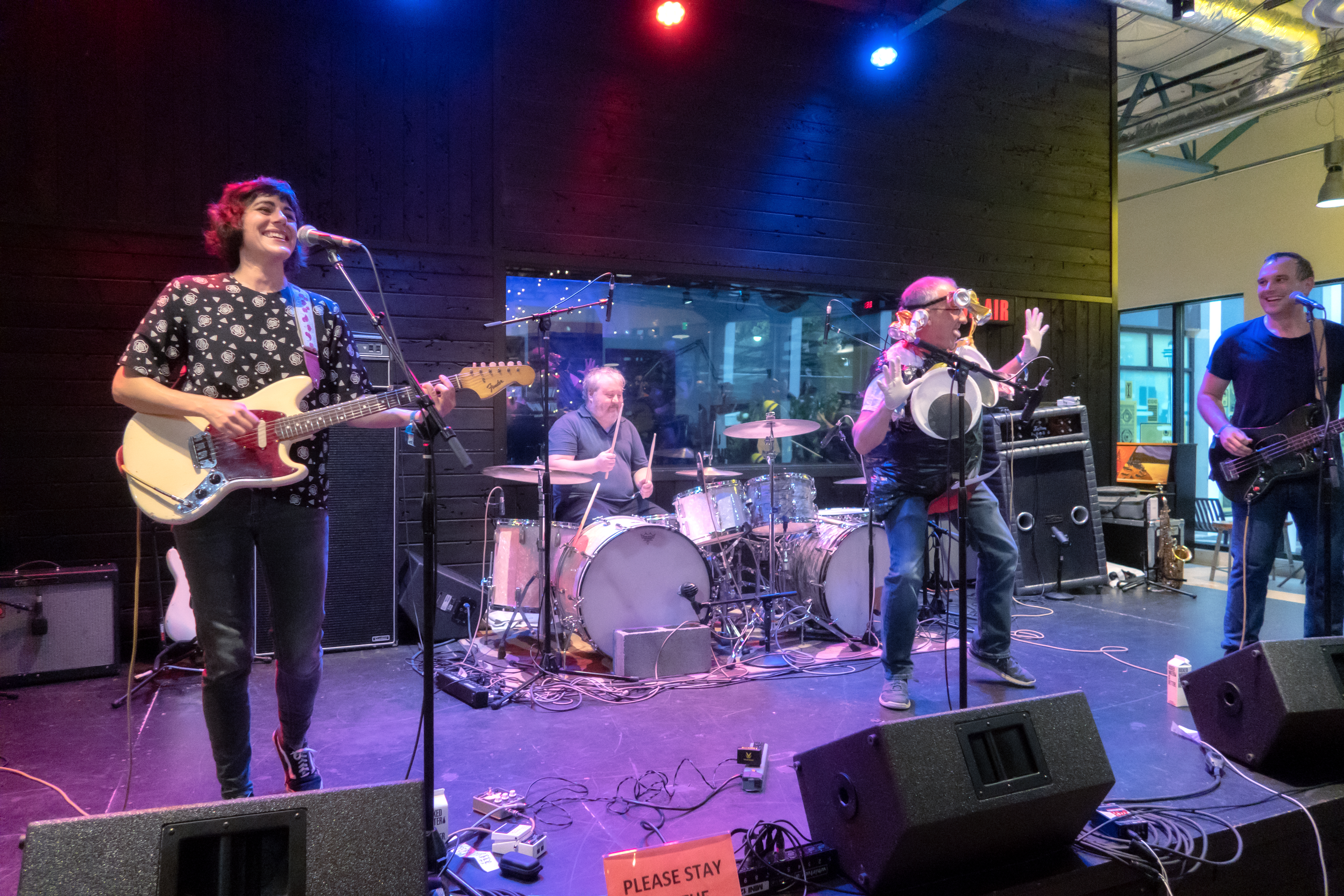
- Wimps

Background information
- Origin: Seattle, Washington
- Genres: Punk rock
- Years active: 2012–present
- Labels: End Of Time Records; Help Yourself Records; Kill Rock Stars
- Members: Dave Ramm; Rachel Ratner; Matt Nyce
- Website: www.thesewimps.com

Wimps is a punk rock band from Seattle, Washington formed in 2012. The band includes drummer Dave Ramm (formerly of The Intelligence), guitarist Rachel Ratner, and bassist Matt Nyce. Their debut album, Repeat, was released on End of Time Records in January 2013. In January 2014 the band released a 7-inch record on the micro-label, Help Yourself Records. In August 2015, the band released an EP called Super Me and were voted Best Punk Band of the year in a Best Of Seattle Reader Poll.

== Discography ==
- Repeat (2013, End of Time Records)
- Party At The Wrong Time (2014, Help Yourself Records)
- Couches (2014, self-released)
- Super Me EP (2015, Kill Rock Stars)
- Suitcase (2015, Kill Rock Stars)
- Garbage People (2018, Kill Rock Stars)
- City Lights (2023, Youth Riot)
