= Unwound =

American noise rock band

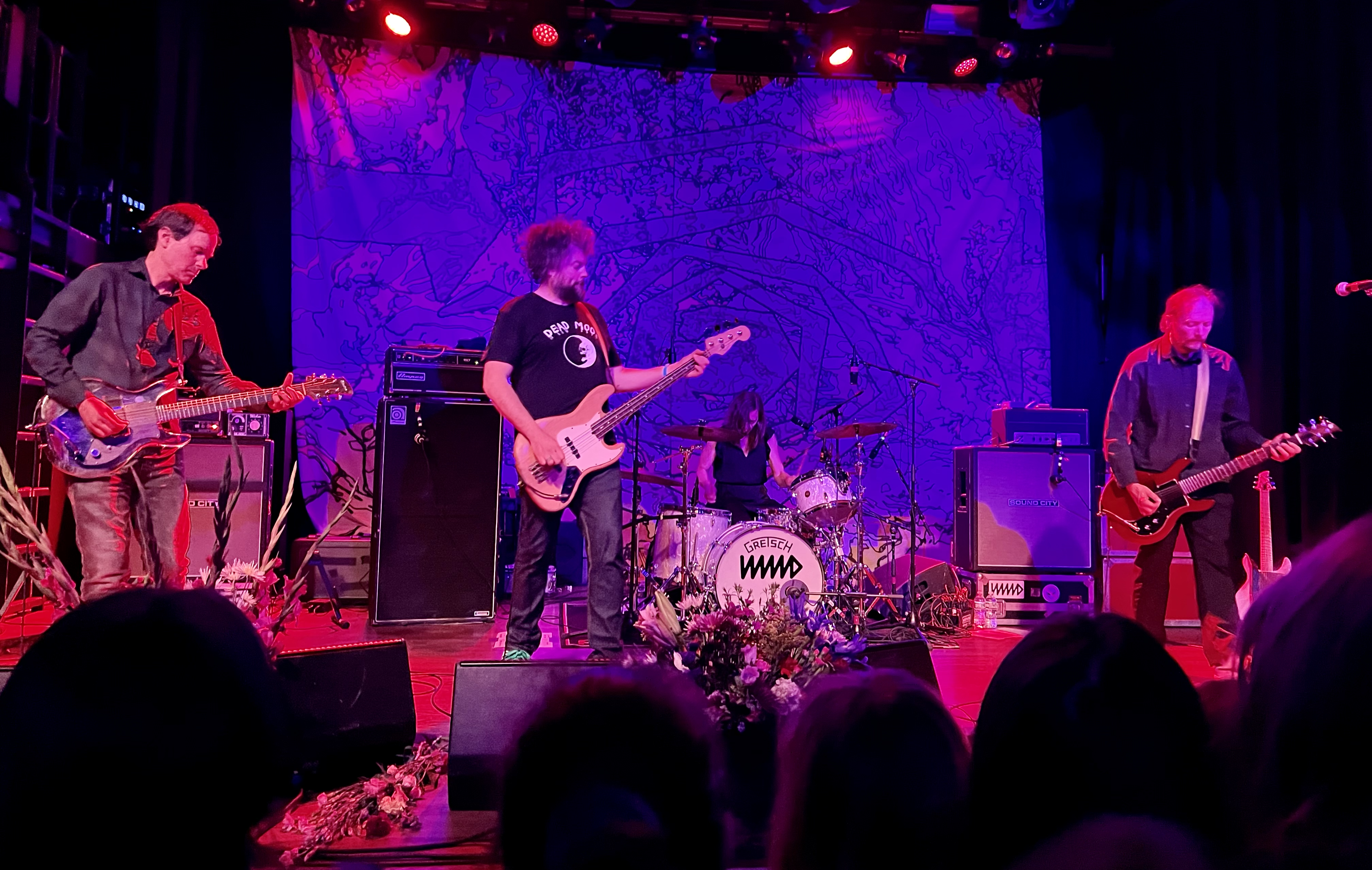
- Unwound performing in 2023. From left to right: Scott Seckington, Jared Warren, Sara Lund, Justin Trosper.

Background information
- Also known as: Johnson, Johnson and Johansson (1988); Giant Henry (1988–1991); Cygnus X-1 (1991)
- Origin: Tumwater, Washington, U.S. Olympia, Washington, U.S.
- Genres: Post-hardcore; emo; noise rock; indie rock
- Works: Unwound discography
- Years active: 1988–2002; 2022–present
- Labels: Kill Rock Stars; Gravity; Troubleman Unlimited; Punk In My Vitamins?; Honeybear; Matador; Rebel Beat Factory; Numero
- Spinoffs: The Corin Tucker Band; Survival Knife; Household Gods; Nocturnal Habits
- Members: Justin Trosper; Sara Lund; Jared Warren; Scott Seckington
- Past members: Vern Rumsey; Brandt Sandeno; David Scott Stone; Johnny Wilson
- Website: unwoundarchive.com

Unwound (/ˈʌnˌwaʊnd/) is an American noise rock/post-hardcore band formed in 1988 in Tumwater and Olympia, Washington. It presently consists of vocalist-guitarist Justin Trosper, bassist Jared Warren, drummer Sara Lund, and guitarist Scott Seckington.

Originally founded by Trosper, bassist Vern Rumsey and drummer Brandt Sandeno under the name "Giant Henry," Sandeno was replaced in 1992 by Lund who performed on their debut album in 1993. Largely based in Olympia throughout the 1990s, the trio consisting of Lund, Trosper, and Rumsey recorded seven albums and numerous singles, and toured relentlessly until disbanding in 2002.

Often classified as noise rock in addition to having post-hardcore influences, Unwound played a sharply dissonant and angular style that made use of unusual guitar tones, and garnered attention locally for their relentless touring schedules, favoring "all-ages" venues and their strong DIY ethics. Unwound was largely associated with the independent record label Kill Rock Stars throughout the 1990s, with the band's debut album, Fake Train (1993), being the first non-spoken word release from the label. Unwound's wider stature grew with the release of the band's fifth and sixth studio albums Repetition (1996) and Challenge for a Civilized Society (1998), which saw the band experiment with their sound beyond noise rock. Unwound's self-produced seventh album, Leaves Turn Inside You (2001), was the band's only double album, and saw the band stylistically shift into post-rock and avant-garde territory; it was critically acclaimed and later appeared on several best-of album lists of the 2000s.

Following a disastrous U.S. tour in support of Leaves Turn Inside You, Unwound announced their disbandment in 2002, citing the band members' geographical differences and Vern Rumsey's worsening alcoholism, caused by the stress of touring. Plans for a reunion were repeatedly brought up and shot down throughout the 2010s due to Rumsey's continuous health struggles, and ultimately never occurred before his death in August 2020. In July 2022, Trosper and Lund reformed Unwound for a 2023 tour in Rumsey's memory, with Jared Warren filling in on bass and Scott Seckington on guitar.

Well regarded during their initial existence, Unwound has frequently been seen as one of the most influential bands of the 1990s and has garnered a dedicated cult following since their 2002 disbandment. In 2013, The A.V. Club called Unwound "the best band of the 90s". Unwound spawned numerous side projects in the wake of their disbandment.

== History ==
=== Formation and career (1988–2000) ===
The first incarnation of the band was formed while all of the members were in high school. The trio began by rehearsing covers of Redd Kross, SNFU, and Hüsker Dü. When Johnny Wilson left the band, the remaining duo made an announcement, looking for a new drummer. When the announcement came to nothing, the group continued as a pair and took inspiration from the Melvins to do something slower and dirtier under the name Johnson, Johnson and Johansson. Finally, Vern Rumsey, another friend from high school joined them. The trio then decided to, in alignment with punk rock's ethos, take on an instrument they did not know how to play. Sandeno played drums, Trosper the guitar, and Rumsey the bass. At this point, Giant Henry was born. During Giant Henry's downtime, Justin Trosper and his friend Adam Shea formed another duo, Supertanker, while Brandt Sandeno played the guitar in Glad. On June 1, 1991, the band played their last show under the Giant Henry name, soon was renamed to Cygnus X-1, and then later Unwound. The band released a self-titled demo tape in 1991, and recorded an album in early 1992 (though it would not be released until 1995 as Unwound). In July 1992, Sara Lund replaced her friend Sandeno as the drummer for the band. This line-up would remain in place until the band's dissolution in 2002.

The group released several singles and albums, primarily on the Kill Rock Stars label. Unwound's Fake Train was their debut album, and the first full-length musical release on Kill Rock Stars; it had been strictly a spoken-word label until its owner Slim Moon attended an Unwound concert and decided he had to release their upcoming album. Unwound also had the maiden releases for several other key underground record labels, including Gravity Records and Troubleman Unlimited Records; side project Replikants had the first release on 5 Rue Christine, an esoteric KRS offshoot. Unwound and sonic/geographic contemporaries Sleater-Kinney were generally considered KRS's flagship bands of the 1990s. Although Unwound was not part of the riot grrrl movement, the band supported gender equality. The band made an appearance in the 1994 cult road movie Half-Cocked.

=== Leaves Turn Inside You, breakup and aftermath (2001–2002) ===
In April 2001, Unwound released their seventh studio album, Leaves Turn Inside You. The album, which saw the band venture into post-rock territory, was critically lauded. Unwound embarked on a 37-date tour of the United States in support of the album as an expanded five-piece, with the inclusion of guitarist David Scott Stone and Brandt Sandeno re-joining the band on keyboards. The tour was beset with numerous problems, including the band being poorly rehearsed for the expanded line-up's shows, which resulted in the band performing poorly at the start of their tour, and the cancellation of their biggest shows in Boston and New York City due to the September 11 attacks. Making matters worse was Vern Rumsey's alcoholism, which had become worse due to the stress of touring; Rumsey was often intoxicated during live performances and played a number of shows in agonizing pain after punching a wall and breaking his hands following a show in San Diego, and his relationships with Trosper and Lund became strained.

Following the conclusion of the US tour, Unwound cancelled all of their European and Japan tour dates and regrouped. After returning to Olympia, Rumsey became reluctant to tour and suggested converting Unwound into a studio-only band (in the vein of the Beatles) in order to combat his alcoholism, which Lund and Trosper were reluctant to do. Ultimately, owing to this as well as issues with the band's members being located in different cities, Unwound decided to disband.

Unwound announced their disbandment on April 1, 2002, shortly after co-headlining that year's All Tomorrow's Parties festival. The fact that they broke up on April Fool's Day fueled speculation that they would, in actuality, remain together; an early band T-shirt had the inscription "Unwound 1991–2091". Troubleman Unlimited's Mike Simonetti after hearing of the band's breakup posted a quick eulogy to Unwound on his record label's website: "Unwound were (and still are) beautiful people. Unwound was one of the most influential and vital bands of the '90s, and their last record was a masterpiece. You just don't know it yet. Unwound's influence will live on for a long time to come, and they were everything a band should be: independent and non-compromising in every aspect."

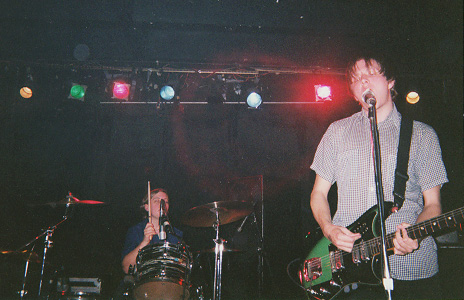
Lund and Trosper performing in the 1990s

=== Post-Unwound projects, attempts to reunite and Vern Rumsey's death (2002–2021) ===
After Unwound broke up, Vern Rumsey formed Flora v. Fauna. Sara Lund formed Hungry Ghost with Andrew Price from the Irving Klaw Trio as well as joining The Corin Tucker Band. In 2011, Brandt Sandeno and Justin Trosper formed Survival Knife.

In 2011, Lund, Trosper and Rumsey reunited in person to discuss the release of Live Leaves, a live album documenting various performances of the band's final tour in 2001. The meeting led to the trio seriously considering reforming the band, though this was struck down when Trosper and Lund realised that Rumsey was still struggling with his alcoholism, which made them reluctant to play shows. "He had gotten a DUI and was being court ordered to go to AA meetings. It was clear he [Rumsey] was just annoyed and it wasn’t a wake-up call", Lund later recounted to Pitchfork in 2022; "I came away from that meeting like, 'Well, I guess we’re not gonna play. I’m not getting back into a relationship with him if he’s still committed to his drinking.'" Live Leaves was eventually released in 2012. An Unwound online archive, curated by the members and fans of the band, was also launched in anticipation to the new release. In 2013, Unwound licensed their back catalog to The Numero Group. They released their pre-Unwound band, Giant Henry, on Record Store Day in 2013 and proceeded to release five box sets, consisting of the band's entire studio output and a smattering of live material.

In the summer of 2017, Rumsey was forced into sobriety following a health crisis brought on by liver failure, which brought forward the possibility again for a reunion; with the help of The Numero Group, Rumsey was put through to MusiCares and was sent to rehab in spring 2018. However, after he left rehab Rumsey relapsed into his alcoholism. In April 2019, Trosper and Lund attempted a rehearsal of some Unwound songs with Rumsey, but he was physically unable to play. Following this, Trosper and Lund decided to take matters into their own hands and told Rumsey that they were intending to play shows without him, and were subsequently given Rumsey's blessing to do so. In March 2020, Jared Warren of Big Business, Melvins, and formerly of Unwound's one-time labelmates Karp, rehearsed with the band on bass to positive results. Warren planned on talking to Vern about the reunion shows, but due to the COVID-19 pandemic, he was never able to. On August 6, 2020, Vern Rumsey died at the age of 47. No cause of death was given.

=== Reunion (2022–present) ===
On July 11, 2022, the band launched an Instagram account and posted a teaser video, which was crossposted to the Numero Group's social media channels. Trosper, Lund, and Warren are seen practicing, though the album version of "Corpse Pose" is heard. The next day, the band announced a 2023 reunion tour; Trosper and Lund enlisted their Nocturnal Habits bandmate Scott Seckington to complete the new lineup on guitar and keyboards.

Unwound's first concert in 21 years was a surprise show that took place on January 28, 2023 at a dance practice center in Astoria, Oregon, to a crowd of 200 ticketholders. The band requested that attendees not post videos of the show on social media. On February 18, 2023, Unwound performed at Numero Group's 20-year anniversary event Numero 20 in Los Angeles. The band's reunion tour took place throughout February and March, including three sold-out nights at New York City's Irving Plaza. On June 2, 2023, Unwound performed at the Primavera Sound festival in Barcelona, the band's first European set since 1999.

== Artistry ==
=== Musical style and influences ===
Unwound's sound has been characterized as "tumultuous and sublimely noisy." According to Fred Thomas of AllMusic, the band "infused traditional pop rock with furious noise, angular riffs, and avant sensibilities."

Unwound's influences included Sonic Youth, Melvins, Fugazi, The Jesus Lizard, Hüsker Dü, Black Flag, Mission of Burma, Wire, Gang of Four, Joy Division, Wipers, Can, Nation of Ulysses, and Flipper. Trosper's guitar work drew on the likes of Black Flag guitarist Greg Ginn, Wipers' Greg Sage, Jimi Hendrix, Chrome guitarist Helios Creed, Tom Verlaine of Television, Tony Iommi of Black Sabbath, John Coltrane, and Peter Brötzmann.

Unwound's embarkment on a major European tour in 1994 proved inspirational to the band. Lund had become enamored with krautrock bands such as Stereolab, This Heat, and Neu!. In an interview with David Wilcox writing for The Numero Group, she said, "This Heat was a huge revelation for me... Because one of the things that’s special about them is that the band leader is the drummer, and they’re very rhythmically oriented—the rhythm and the drums are front and center." On the other hand, Trosper was exposed to British post-punk acts such as the Fire Engines and Wire through their friends in the band Huggy Bear. Trosper subsequently became interested in incorporating elements of no wave into the band's music. The massive live sound of the New York experimental rock band Swans inspired Trosper to start layering multiple guitar tracks: "To get the right effect, it has to be overdone."

Evidence of the Black Flag influence can be seen in Trosper and Sandeno's side band with Tim Green (of Nation of Ulysses), The Young Ginns (named after Black Flag guitarist/songwriter Greg Ginn), and in their interpolation of Black Flag's lyric "I'm not a machine" in their song "Machine" (on Replikants' debut album). Trosper and Sandeno were also in a band called Worst Case Scenario that released an album on Vermiform Records. Unwound's early work was characterized by intense vocals, jagged guitar lines, and more complex drumming than the band's peers. The band's lyrics, written by Trosper, were highly existential, cryptic, and generally bleak. From this angular, atonal starting point, the band developed their signature sound over the course of several albums and numerous singles. With 1996's Repetition, Unwound added synthesizers to the mix. Free-jazz style saxophone found its way onto 1998's Challenge For A Civilized Society. The band recorded Peel sessions with John Peel at the BBC in 1998; these were broadcast over the radio, and were released as the semi-official bootleg Unwound - Live in London (on Love Letter), later released officially as the Peel Sessions EP in 2015. This new direction set a precedent that the band would follow for their remaining albums, culminating in the release of 2001's Leaves Turn Inside You, a double album the band recorded themselves over the course of two years. Unwound never covered any other artists' songs on their albums, though they did cover "Plight" by Minutemen and "Torch Song" by pre-Versus band Flower on singles.

The band's style of writing was loose and freeform; Trosper said in an interview for the Songs for Cassavetes documentary that "the music we write is very rarely brought to practice as a song...all of our songs are written in-practice when we sit and play".

=== Equipment ===
Trosper played several kinds of odd guitars, including the Univox Hi-Flier (made famous by Kurt Cobain), generally preferring guitars with P-90 pickups. He sometimes played a clear Lucite (Plexiglas), Electra or Ventura, Japanese budget copy of the expensive originals designed by Dan Armstrong and produced by Ampeg. He sometimes used an Echoplex in the band's spacier ambient passages. Rumsey generally played a Fender Jazz Bass. He and Trosper often used Sunn and Kustom amplifiers, generally solid-state models; Trosper's main amp up to 1999 was a Sunn Concert Lead. Lund played a 1970s Ludwig drum kit.

=== Live performances ===
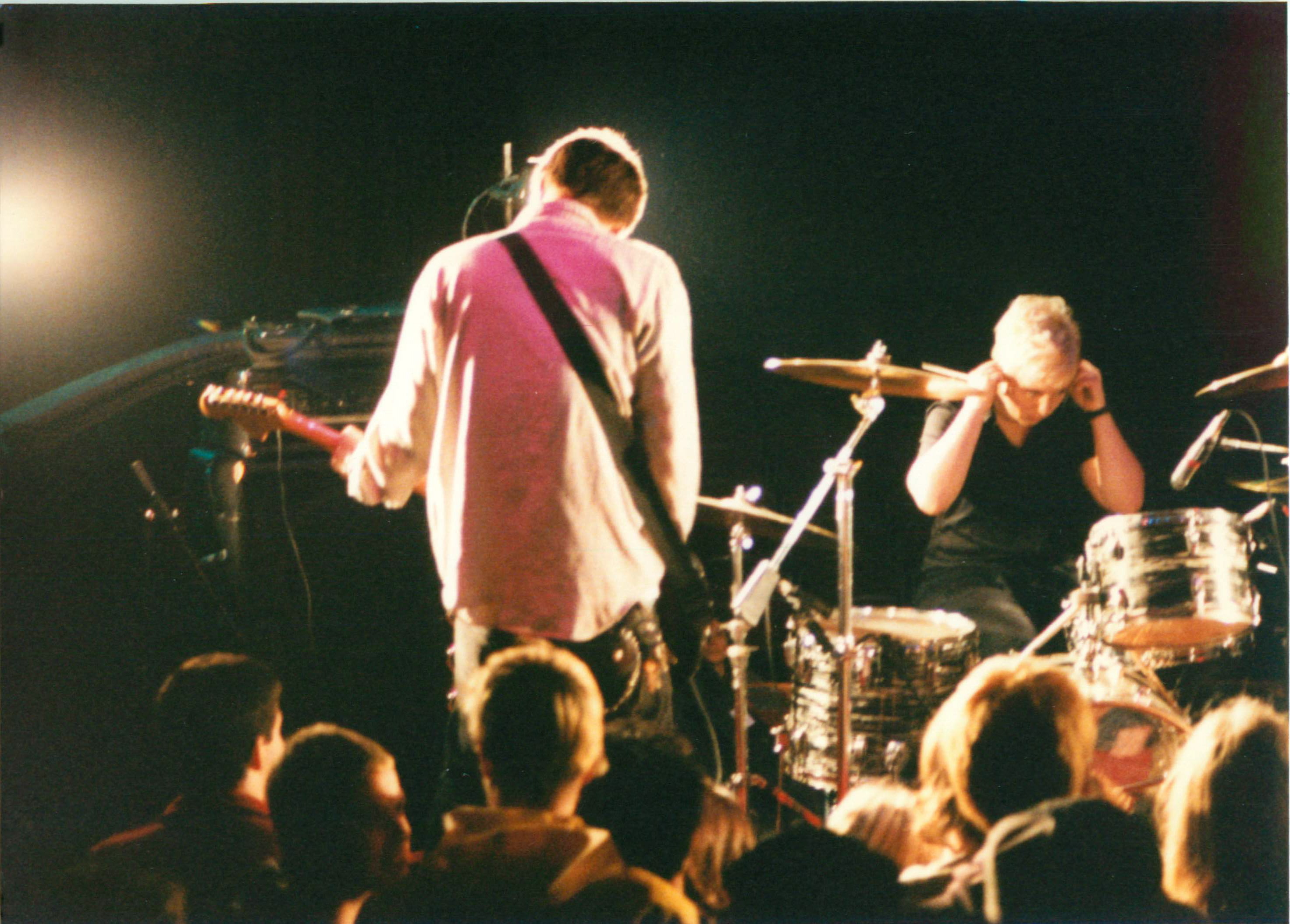
Drummer Lund and bassist Vern Rumsey

The band was known for its non stop touring of the U.S. and Europe, and occasionally Japan. It shared stages over the years with the likes of the following, with earliest known date in parentheses: Bikini Kill ('90), Steel Pole Bath Tub ('91), Universal Order of Armageddon ('94), Versus ('94), Clikatat Ikatowi ('95), Sonic Youth ('95), Polvo ('95), Fugazi ('95), Hovercraft ('96), Lowercase, Polar Goldie Cats, Deerhoof ('98), Mogwai ('99), Slug, The PeeChees ('98), Chokebore, The Most Secret Method ('99), Yind ('99), Blonde Redhead ('95), Dub Narcotic Sound System, xbxrx (who formed after attending an Unwound concert in Biloxi, Mississippi, in 1998) (2001), and many more (members of Unwound and Yind occasionally performed live as "avant-Sverige" "supergroup" Shag Bath). During their last tour before disbanding, the band enlisted David Scott Stone as an additional guitarist and original drummer Brandt Sandeno on keyboards, percussion and guitar.

The band was known for having an all-ages policy at almost every concert which it headlined. This meant that they would often choose to play at unconventional locations such as basements, Jaycee halls, and college auditoriums, rather than at the traditional 18+ or 21+ (alcohol-serving) music clubs. They did this because they frequented all-ages shows in Olympia as teens, so they wanted to let fans of any age attend their own gigs. They also made sure to keep door prices low "so you don't spend a fortune, and if we play a bad show...it's only five or six dollars."

=== Artwork ===
Fake Train's cover art is a defiled copy of the Tom Jones LP cover for Tom, which had been hanging over Trosper's doorway. The front cover photo to New Plastic Ideas is taken from the Philippe Entremont record Grieg: Concerto in A Minor for Piano and Orchestra. The cover and inner artwork of The Future of What are illustrations by Ukrainian constructivist artist Yakiv Chernikhov. A photo of Boston's stained-glass Mapparium adorns the cover of Challenge For A Civilized Society. Coincidentally, a similar photo of the Mapparium appeared on the cover of National Geographic magazine a month after Challenge was released. The cover artwork of the band's five Numero Group box sets - Kid Is Gone, Rat Conspiracy, No Energy, Empire, and What Was Wound - are all taken from the band's live shows.

LP versions of Unwound's albums and their reissues are packaged with elaborate inserts, including posters and lyric sheets that the CD versions lack. The aforementioned box sets are all packaged with a corresponding booklet, featuring essays and band photos that to align to the respective era of the band, along with reprints of tour flyers, tour schedules, and setlists.

== Legacy ==
=== Impact ===
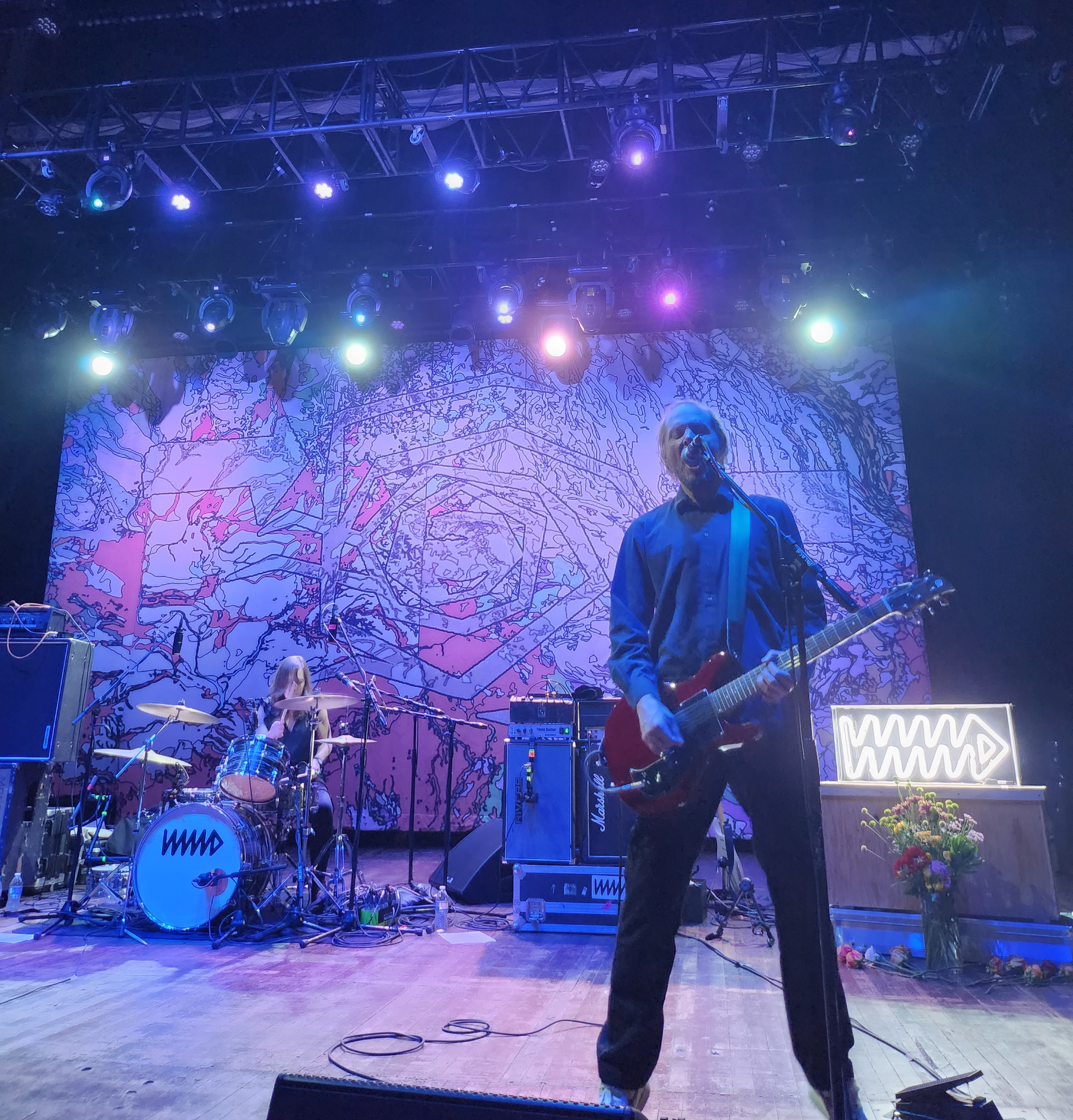
Trosper and Lund performing with Unwound in 2023

According to Fred Thomas of AllMusic, despite being "[a]nnexed to the less mainstream channels of indie releases, low-budget touring, and a circuit of basement and underground shows, Unwound still managed to create some of the more influential and lasting work of their era, with their cloudy moods and explosively tense group dynamics culminating in some truly transcendent albums." Carrie Brownstein of Sleater-Kinney wrote for NPR that Unwound's "influence and successors far outshine its own story. Which is a shame, because Unwound synthesized all that was exciting about Olympia and music in the Pacific Northwest. Its music dark and often experimental; it had pop riffs that grew out of murkiness only to disappear again; its songs gave you glimmers of light but never flooded you with sun; there was angst but not brutality; it possessed an uneven wilderness, which is all you'd ever want from music, something unexpected emerging from what we already know." The A.V. Club called Unwound the best band of the 90's, with Jason Heller writing:

Unwound is the best band of the ’90s. Not just because of how prolific, consistent, and uncompromising it was, but because of how perfectly Unwound nested in a unique space betweenn [sic] some of the most vital forms of music that decade: punk, post-rock, indie rock, noise-alternative, slow-core, and experimental noise. That jumble of subgenres doesn’t say much; in fact, it falls far short of what Unwound truly synthesized and stood for. Unwound stood for Unwound. But in a decade where most bands were either stridently earnest or stridently ironic, Unwound wasn’t stridently anything. It was only itself. In one sense Unwound was the quietest band of the ’90s, skulking around like a nerdy terror cell. In another sense it was the loudest, sculpting raw noise into contorted visions of inner turmoil and frustration.

Heavy metal magazine Decibel recognized them as an influence on bands "like Botch, Young Widows, KEN Mode, Coliseum, Helms Alee and so on and so forth." Conrad Keely of ...And You Will Know Us by the Trail of Dead named Fake Train one of 10 albums that had changed his life forever, stating that it had "epitomized America's disaffected, self-hating white middle-class guilt victims screaming about the fact that they have nothing to do with their time other than be bored, nothing to speak out against other than their own ennui and unwarranted discontent. And although that might sound like a criticism or an indictment, the fact is that this sentiment existed, it was shared by a lot of us, and it found its voice in albums like Fake Train (and Fugazi's Thirteen Songs)." Kazu Makino of Blonde Redhead picked The Future of What as her favorite album of all time, calling it "absolutely timeless. When I listen to each member separately it astonishes me how gifted and original they are on their own [...] if I could only play this music to Bach or Mozart or any classical greats I think they would totally get it." Modest Mouse were recognized by many sources as being influenced by the band, and Isaac Brock's label Glacial Pace would later go on to release albums by both Survival Knife and Nocturnal Habits. Other bands and musicians that have cited Unwound as being an influence on their music include Speedy Ortiz, Gouge Away, True Widow, Dirty Dishes, Drumcorps, Black Dice, Garden Variety, Pg. 99, Portraits of Past, Shamir, and Super Unison.

=== Side projects and post-Unwound bands ===
Members of Unwound participated in a number of projects that ran concurrent to Unwound, each self-styled as highly conceptual and distinct from the parent band.

Trosper and Sandeno, who have collaborated musically since the mid-80's, helmed an experimental venture called Replikants (not to be confused with the band Replicants, which featured members of Failure and Tool). Early on, they each acted as multi-instrumentalists for the group. Inspired by John Cage, Can, and Miles Davis, they combined jazz, ambient music, tape loops, musique concrète and vocal samples atop a krautrock-propelled base. Their debut album released in 1997,This Is Our Message, consisted of home recordings from 1994 to 1996 (the CD version contained ten bonus tracks not included on the vinyl version due to time constraints). William Goldsmith of Foo Fighters and Sunny Day Real Estate played drums for a period in 1996 before they started playing with drummer Joe Plummer of Bare Minimum and The Black Heart Procession and later of Modest Mouse and The Shins and a rotating cast of members. With more of an electro-rock sound, their second and final album Slickaphonics was released on 5RC in 1999. A West Coast tour ensued that summer and after it, Trosper shelved Replikants to focus his energy on finishing Unwound's next album. Sandeno and Trosper also collaborated with video artist Slater Bradley on a number of projects between 1999 and 2005 including a piece in the 2004 Whitney Biennial. They stopped performing as the Replikants in 2002.

Rumsey and friend Greg Allen recorded as enigmatic New Romantic-styled pop band Long Hind Legs in the 1990s. Rumsey used the pseudonym "Wolfgang" and Allen used the alias "Paul", with only astute Unwound fans aware of their real identities. Following a slew of singles, their debut self-titled album came out in 1997 on Kill Rock Stars. The 12" EP "Open Wide" (+ remixes)/ "Alphabets Of Unreason" was released simultaneously. The February 4–14, 1998 EP was released in 1998 on Kill Rock Stars.

Trosper and Sandeno also played together in two other bands, the Young Ginns, and Worst Case Scenario. The Young Ginns also featured Tim Green of The Nation Of Ulysses on guitar (Justin played bass). The project was first conceived in 1991 when Brandt and Justin were stuck at Tim's house while on tour with Unwound. The band later became a reality when Green moved to Olympia. They released a 7" on Gravity Records in 1993. In 1998, all their recordings were compiled and released on CD by Honey Bear Records. After the Young Ginns, Sandeno and Trosper formed Worst Case Scenario. Worst Case Scenario released two 7"s, one on Troubleman Unlimited and the other on Lookout! Records, and an album on Vermiform Records. Vermiform would release the group's entire discography on CD in 1997. Both the Young Ginns and Worst Case Scenario displayed a hardcore punk sound.

Justin Trosper also performed in Severed Lethargy (with members of Bikini Kill) and Sara Lund and Vern Rumsey performed with the musical collective Witchypoo. Rumsey also played bass on Blonde Redhead's Fake Can Be Just as Good album. In 2010, Lund became drummer of The Corin Tucker Band, on which she works along the former Sleater-Kinney vocalist and guitarist, as well as with the Golden Bears' Seth Lorinczi.

Rumsey founded and ran Punk In My Vitamins? Records, releasing material by Lowercase, Yind, the Bangs, Karp, Thrones, Dub Narcotic Sound System, and Chokebore. Trosper published several issues of his own underground rock fanzine in the early 1990s.

Trosper formed Survival Knife with Brandt of Unwound and later, the well-received band Nocturnal Habits with Sara Lund. Vern Rumsey joined up with David Pajo, Lauren K. Newman and Conan Neutron for Household Gods, as well as performing solo as Red Rumsey.

== Members ==
=== Current members ===
- Justin Trosper – guitar, vocals (1988–2002, 2022–present), keyboards, saxophone (1997–2002)
- Sara Lund – drums (1992–2002, 2022–present), percussion (1997–2002, 2022–present), backing vocals (2000–2002)
- Jared Warren – bass (2022–present)
- Scott Seckington – guitar (2022–present)

=== Former members ===
- Johnny Wilson – drums (1988)
- Brandt Sandeno – drums (1988–1992), keyboards, percussion, backing vocals (2001)
- Vern Rumsey – bass (1988–2002), keyboards, vocals (1997–2002) (died 2020)
- David Scott Stone – guitar (2001)

== Discography ==
- Fake Train (1993, Kill Rock Stars)
- New Plastic Ideas (1994, Kill Rock Stars)
- The Future of What (1995, Kill Rock Stars)
- Unwound (1995, Honey Bear)
- Repetition (1996, Kill Rock Stars)
- Challenge for a Civilized Society (1998, Kill Rock Stars)
- Leaves Turn Inside You (2001, Kill Rock Stars)
