= Vern Rumsey =

American musician (1973–2020)

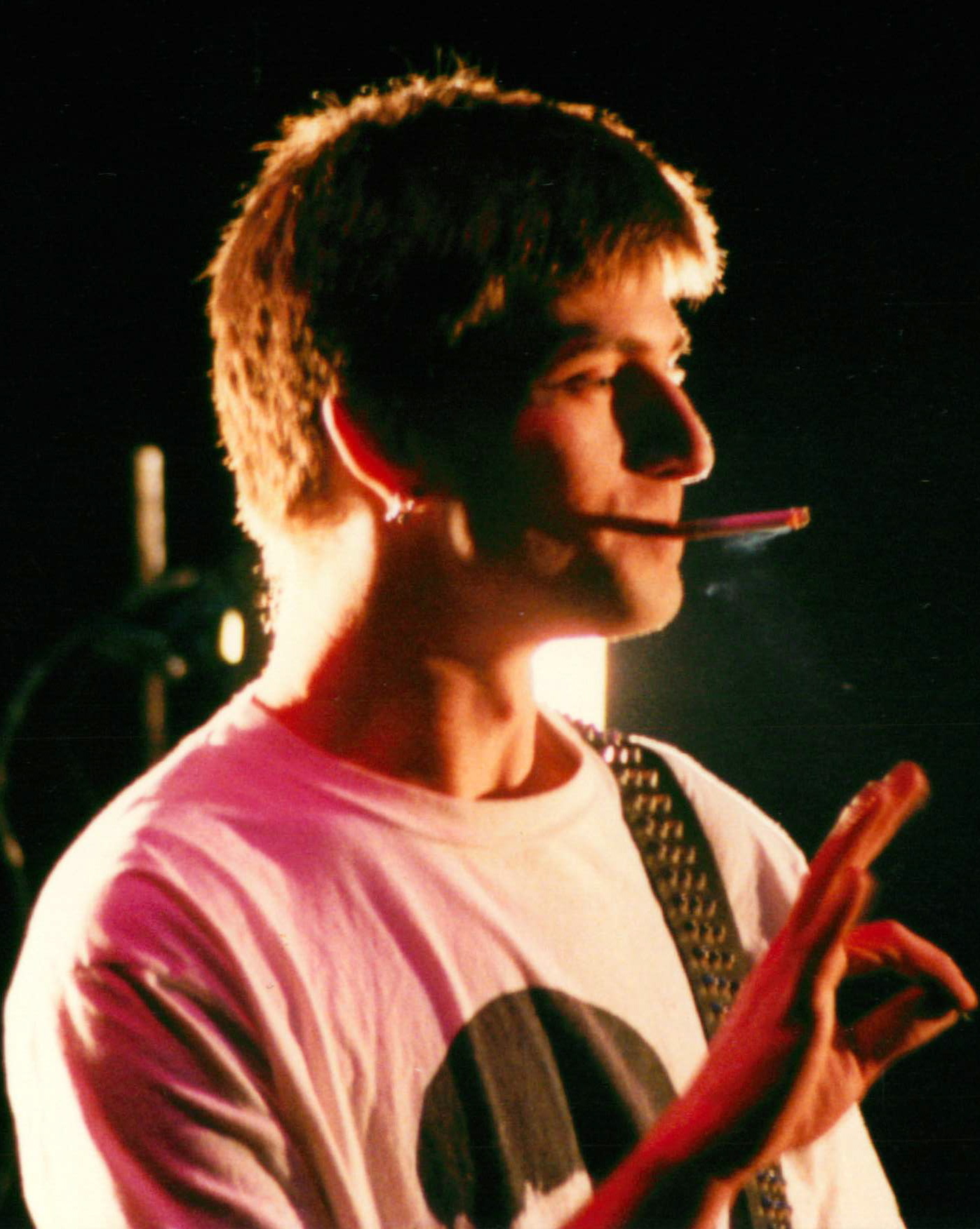
- Rumsey in 2008.
- Born: Vernon Emmry Aldo Rumsey; January 24, 1973
- Died: August 6, 2020 (aged 47)
- Other names: Doombuggy; Red Rumsey
- Occupations: Musician; recording engineer
- Years active: 1991–2020
- Height: 6 ft 3 in (191 cm)
- Spouse: Ana Rumsey
- Musical career
- Genres: Post-hardcore; indie rock
- Formerly of: Unwound; Household Gods; Fitz of Depression

Vernon Emmry Aldo Rumsey (January 24, 1973 – August 6, 2020) was an American musician. He is best known for his work as the bassist of the post-hardcore band Unwound, in which he was a co-founding member. He was also in the bands Long Hind Legs, Oslo, Fitz of Depression, and Witchypoo, and (in 2009) was playing in the band Flora v. Fauna.

He generally played a Fender Jazz bass. He was also a recording engineer who has worked with bands such as Blonde Redhead, KARP, Enemymine, Novex and Replicator.

Rumsey played bass guitar on the Blonde Redhead record Fake Can Be Just as Good, and co-ran the label Punk in My Vitamins, with his bandmates Justin Trosper and Sara Lund.

He has been variously credited as Doombuggy, Red Rumsey, RedRumsey, Rumsey, Vern and Vernon Rumsey.

Rumsey died on August 6, 2020; he was 47. His death sparked an outpouring of support and testimonials amongst many music communities.
