= Justin Trosper =

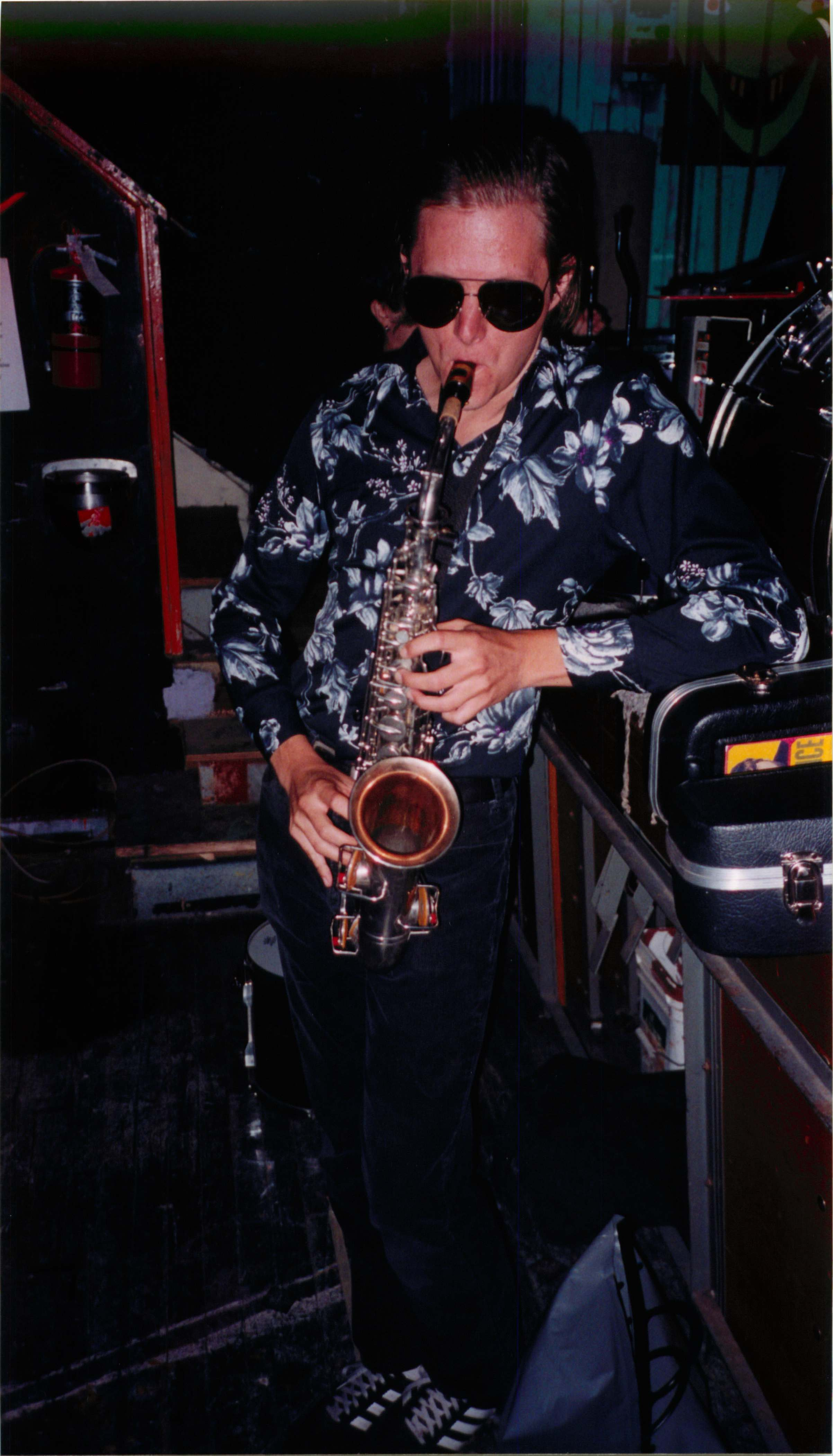
- Trosper playing the saxophone in an undated photo.

Background information
- Born: November 10, 1972 (age 53); Olympia, Washington, United States
- Origin: Tumwater, Washington, United States
- Genres: Noise rock; experimental rock; post-hardcore
- Occupations: Musician; producer; songwriter
- Instruments: Guitar; vocals; saxophone
- Years active: 1988–present
- Labels: Kill Rock Stars; 5 Rue Christine; Punk in My Vitamins; Numero
- Member of: Unwound
- Formerly of: Survival Knife
- Website: www.nocturnalhabits.com

Justin Keith Trosper (born November 10, 1972) is an American musician, songwriter, and record producer, born in Olympia, Washington. He fronted the post-hardcore band Unwound from 1991 to 2002 and again since the band's reunion in 2022. He has also been a member of bands such as Replikants, The Young Ginns, and Worst Case Scenario. Most of his work has been released through the independent record label Kill Rock Stars.

Trosper has been a record producer for several Olympia-area bands, primarily at Unwound's self-built recording studio, MagRecOne. He has worked on albums by artists such as Thrones (Joe Preston), Young People, Shoplifting, Godzik Pink, Bangs, Long Hind Legs, Anna Oxygen, and The Magic Magicians.

In the early 1990s, he self-published the punk/indie rock fanzine, "Joe Preston's Legs AKA Germ of Youth". He is also a friend of Bikini Kill's Tobi Vail and a graduate of The Evergreen State College. In 2012, Trosper and former Unwound drummer Brandt Sandeno formed Survival Knife.
