= Sara Lund =

American drummer (born 1973)

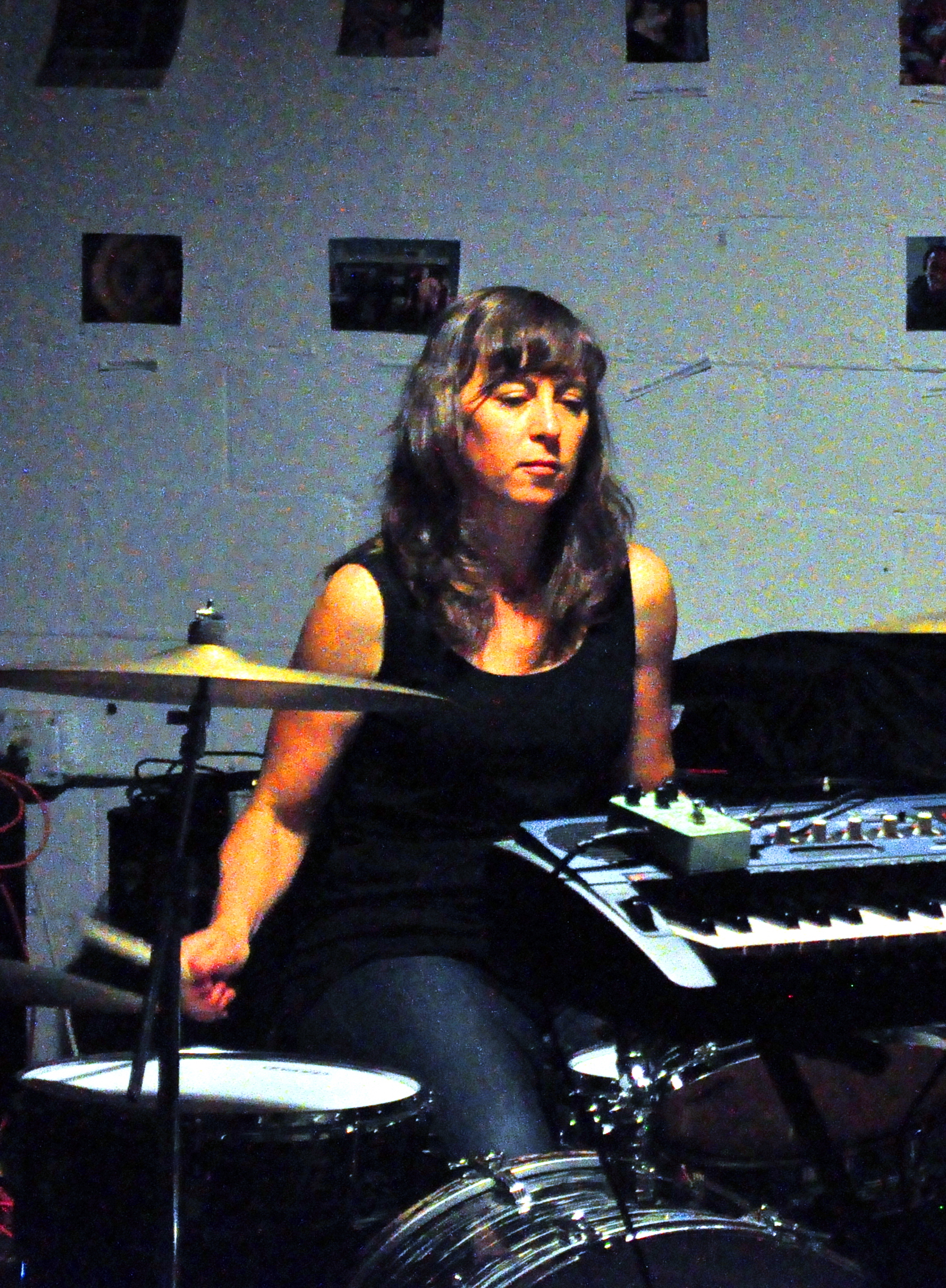
- Lund drumming at the Olympia Experimental Music Festival in 2014

Background information
- Born: Sara Longacre Lund; 1973 (age 52–53); Bloomington, Indiana, United States
- Origin: Olympia, Washington, United States
- Occupation: Musician
- Instrument: Drums
- Years active: 1991–present
- Member of: Unwound
- Website: www.saralundrum.com

Sara Lund (born 1973) is an American musician. She is best known as the drummer for the Olympia, Washington post-hardcore band Unwound for a decade until their break up in 2002. Lund was playing for Witchypoo when she joined Unwound in 1992 replacing original drummer Brandt Sandeno.

Lund started playing drums in school band and got her first drum set when she was fourteen. She has played drums in bands ever since. She is entirely self-taught other than school band. She has been called "one of the most unconventional, inventive, original drummers of the past twenty years."

== Equipment ==
Her setup is:

- 1971 three-piece black oyster pearl Ludwig 12/16/22 with a Rogers Powertone snare
- Zildjian cymbals:
  - 14″ 1960s hi-hats
  - 17″ K Dark Crash
  - 18″ 1960s or ’70s crash
  - 21″ 1960s ride
- Vater Manhattans 7A drumsticks

She also plays a number of different percussive instruments including "cowbell, Korean temple block, African agogo bells, ribbon crasher, Vibra-Slap, maracas, tambourine, cabasa, jingle bells, goat nails." She has also played drums for the Corin Tucker Band and the percussion ensemble Secret Drum Band. She is currently a member of Nocturnal Habits and Hungry Ghost and teaches drumming lessons.

== Personal life ==
Lund grew up in Indiana and moved to Olympia, Washington briefly as a child in the mid-1980s and then back again as an adult in 1991. Her father was originally from Denmark, but both of her parents grew up in Connecticut. She currently lives in Portland, Oregon. She has a master's degree in Library Science from the University of Washington and BA in Liberal Arts from The Evergreen State College. She has one son with Aaron Beam from Red Fang.

In 2024, Lund was diagnosed with breast cancer.
