= Kill Rock Stars =

American record label

- Parent company: Exceleration Music
- Founded: February 1991; 35 years ago
- Founder: Slim Moon; Tinuviel Sampson
- Distributor: Redeye Distribution
- Genre: Rock; indie rock; punk rock; electronic
- Country of origin: United States
- Location: Portland, Oregon
- Official website: www.killrockstars.com

Kill Rock Stars is an independent record label founded in February 1991 by Slim Moon and Tinuviel Sampson, and based in both Olympia, Washington, and Portland, Oregon. The label has released a variety of work in different genres, but it was originally known for its commitment to underground punk rock bands and the Olympia area music scene.

== History ==
Sampson and Moon initially started the label because, in Moon's words, "I just wanted to put out my friends' records because nobody was putting out my friends' records. And to put out spoken word 7-inch records." KRS-101 (the label's first release) was in fact a split 7-inch spoken-word record with Kathleen Hanna and Slim Moon; other "Wordcore" releases followed. The first major release was a compilation of Olympia-area bands simply titled Kill Rock Stars (Stars Kill Rock and Rock Stars Kill would follow in the same compilation series) and featured Bikini Kill, Bratmobile, Unwound, Nirvana, Mecca Normal, Heavens to Betsy, The Nation of Ulysses, and the Melvins, among others.

Although the label's music has never reflected a singular genre or underground music movement, it is arguably most notable for releasing the work of various riot grrrl bands during the mid-'90s, some of which, especially Bikini Kill, generated a good deal of press attention. Other Kill Rock Stars releases in this genre includes albums by Bratmobile, Huggy Bear, Heavens to Betsy and Excuse 17.

The label continued its tradition of spoken word by releasing their first full-length spoken-word LP Big Broad by Juliana Luecking in 1995. This was also the year that Elliott Smith released his self-titled solo LP on the label. Another milestone was the 1997 release of Sleater-Kinney's third LP (and first on Kill Rock Stars) Dig Me Out, which garnered national press attention in Spin and Rolling Stone.

In 1997–98, the 5RC label was formed as a sister label to Kill Rock Stars; it released generally harsher-sounding and more experimental rock than Kill Rock Stars. The 5RC roster included Xiu Xiu, Deerhoof, Need New Body, The Mae Shi, The Robot Ate Me, and Metalux, among others. 1998 also marked the first-ever Mailorder Freak Singles Club, featuring Quasi, Small Stars, Sta-Prest, and Rock*A*Teens, among others.

Another popular band on Kill Rock Stars was the Decemberists, who released three full-length albums on the label between 2001 and 2005. The band's singer, Colin Meloy, also released a solo album on the label in April 2008. Other notable releases by Kill Rock Stars include albums by the Paper Chase, Jeff Hanson, Unwound, Marnie Stern, the Gossip, Mecca Normal, Two Ton Boa and Comet Gain; spoken word albums by Kathy Acker and Miranda July; and reissues of work by earlier punk/post-punk bands such as Kleenex/Liliput, Essential Logic, and Delta 5.

In October 2006, Slim Moon, the label's owner, announced he would be departing Kill Rock Stars to work as an A&R representative at Nonesuch Records, a Warner Music Group subsidiary. Moon's wife, Portia Sabin, then took over ownership of Kill Rock Stars. In 2007, the label released eleven records, including New Moon, a collection of songs recorded by Elliott Smith between 1994 and 1997. The label has begun to further diversify its roster: since 2013, Kill Rock Stars has released albums by comedians including W. Kamau Bell, Nathan Brannon, Kurt Braunohler, River Butcher, Cameron Esposito, Emily Heller, Hot Tub with Kurt and Kristen, Ian Karmel, Hari Kondabolu, and Amy Miller.

In September 2019, Kill Rock Stars issued a press release announcing Slim Moon's return to management of the label after a thirteen-year hiatus, as well as the signing of Portland band MAITA; the press release described the signing as "both previous label head Portia Sabin's last act and the first initiative of Slim Moon in his second tenure as guiding light of KRS".

In February 2022, it was announced that independent music company Exceleration Music had acquired the Kill Rock Stars catalog and formed a partnership with its founder, Slim Moon. Under the deal, Moon would continue to handle A&R and would be actively signing and developing new artists.

List of KRS compilation albums
Date	Title	Catalogue Number	Notes
1991	Kill Rock Stars	KRS 201	Rereleased in 2013 as part of the Kill Rock Stars / Stars Kill Rock / Rock Stars Kill triple cassette KRS 573
1993	Stars Kill Rock	KRS 207	Rereleased in 2013 as part of the Kill Rock Stars / Stars Kill Rock / Rock Stars Kill triple cassette KRS 573
1994	Rock Stars Kill	KRS 221	Rereleased in 2013 as part of the Kill Rock Stars / Stars Kill Rock / Rock Stars Kill triple cassette KRS 573
1995	A Slice of Lemon	KRS 100 LK 100	Double CD/LP split record label release with Lookout! Records
1997	Some Songs: From The Kill Rock Stars Singles	KRS 276	
1999	Drinking From Puddles: A Radio History	KRS 318	
2000	Jackson's Jukebox	KRS 354	
2001	Turbo's Tunes	KRS 319	'a kill rock stars retrospective sampler'
2002	Fields And Streams	KRS 341	Double CD
2003	Mollie's Mix	KRS 382	
2004	Tracks And Fields	KRS 401	Double CD
2006	Otis' Opuses	KRS 358	
2006	The Sound The Hare Heard	KRS 449	
2008	Kill Rock ★s 2008 Sampler	KRS 496	
2008	Mountain Magic: A Kill Rock Stars Collection 1991-2000	PCD-18005	One of a pair of compilations released in Japan by P-Vine Records
2008	Mountain Magic: A Kill Rock Stars Collection 2000-2008	PCD-18004	One of a pair of compilations released in Japan by P-Vine Records
2011	20 Years Of Kill Rock Stars	KRS 558	
2012	Kill Rock Stars Winter Holiday Album	KRS 470	Digital only release
2014	Crazed Fans MP3 Vol. 1	-	Digital only release
2021	Deerhoof Sandwich	-	Digital only release
2021	Stars Rock Kill (Rock Stars)	-	64-track digital only release of bands covering songs from the KRS back catalogue
2021	30 Years (Kill Rock ★s)	-	
2021	It's Hard To Dance When It's Cold And There's No Music: Kill Rock Stars Winter Holiday Album Volume 2	-	
2023	Spelljams	KRS 733	Compilation inspired by Dungeons and Dragons

== See also ==
- List of companies based in Oregon
- List of record labels
- List of Kill Rock Stars artists
- 5 Rue Christine
