= Bikini Kill discography =

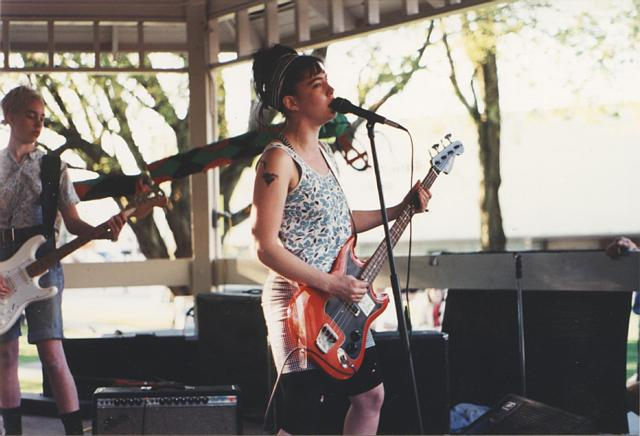
- Bikini Kill in 1991
- Studio albums: 3
- EPs: 1
- Compilation albums: 2
- Singles: 4
- Split albums: 1
- Other appearances: 6

The discography of Bikini Kill, an American punk rock band, consists of three studio albums, one split studio album, two compilation albums, one extended play (EP) and four singles.

Bikini Kill was formed in Olympia, Washington in October 1990 by vocalist Kathleen Hanna, guitarist Billy Karren, bassist Kathi Wilcox and drummer Tobi Vail. The band's debut studio album, Revolution Girl Style Now!, was released in 1991. Consisting of demo recordings, the album was a limited independent release on cassette—in accordance with the band's DIY ethic. Bikini Kill later signed with the independent record label Kill Rock Stars and released its eponymous debut EP in October 1992. Following its release, the band began touring the United Kingdom with fellow riot grrrl band Huggy Bear, with whom Bikini Kill released a split studio album, Yeah Yeah Yeah Yeah, in March 1993. The band's second studio album, Pussy Whipped, was released in October 1993 and following its release, Bikini Kill was referred to as the pioneers of the riot grrrl movement. Bikini Kill's final studio album, Reject All American, was released in April 1996. The Singles, a compilation of non-album singles released between 1993 and 1996, was released in 1998 following the band's dissolution.

None of Bikini Kill's releases experienced commercial success—except Yeah Yeah Yeah Yeah, which peaked at number 12 in the UK Albums Chart upon its release—however, the band received critical acclaim from underground and mainstream publications during its career. Bikini Kill has been noted as an influence on a number of alternative rock bands, including Sleater-Kinney, Sonic Youth, Gossip, Tegan and Sara, Nirvana and Pussy Riot.

== Albums ==
=== Studio albums ===
List of studio albums
| Title | Album information |
|---|---|
| Revolution Girl Style Now! | Released: 1991 (US); Label: Self-released; Format: CS, CD, LP |
| Pussy Whipped | Released: October 26, 1993 (US); Labels: Kill Rock Stars (218), Wiiija (028); Formats: CD, LP |
| Reject All American | Released: April 5, 1996 (US); Label: Kill Rock Stars (260); Formats: CD, LP |

=== Split albums ===
List of split studio albums with chart positions
| Title | Album information | Peak chart positions |
| Title | Album information | UK |
|---|---|---|
| Yeah Yeah Yeah Yeah (with Huggy Bear) | Released: March 1993 (US); Labels: Kill Rock Stars (206), Catcall (001); Formats: LP, CS | 12 |

=== Compilation albums ===
List of compilation albums
| Title | Album information |
|---|---|
| The C.D. Version of the First Two Records | Released: March 4, 1994 (US); Label: Kill Rock Stars (204); Format: CD |
| The Singles | Released: June 23, 1998 (US); Labels: Kill Rock Stars (298); Formats: CD |

== Extended plays ==
List of extended plays
| Title | Album information |
|---|---|
| Bikini Kill | Released: October 9, 1992 (US); Label: Kill Rock Stars (204); Format: 12" |

== Singles ==
List of singles
| Title | Year | Album |
|---|---|---|
| "New Radio"/"Rebel Girl" | 1993 | Non-album single |
| "The Anti-Pleasure Dissertation" | 1995 | Non-album single |
| "I Like Fucking" | 1995 | Non-album single |

=== Split singles ===
List of split singles
| Title | Year | Album |
|---|---|---|
| "Take on Me"/"Capri Pants" (with Team Dresch) | 1996 | Reject All American |

== Other appearances ==
List of other appearances on compilation albums
| Song | Year | Album | Notes | Ref. |
|---|---|---|---|---|
| "Feels Blind" | 1991 | Kill Rock Stars | From Bikini Kill. | |
| "Suck My Left One" | 1994 | There's a Dyke in the Pit | From Bikini Kill. | |
| "New Radio" | 1997 | Some Songs: From the Kill Rock Stars Singles | From "New Radio". | |
| "Candy" | 2001 | Throw: The Yo-Yo Studio Compilation | From Revolution Girl Style Now!. | |
| "Capri Pants" | 2005 | Whatever: The '90s Pop & Culture Box | From Reject All American. | |
| "Capri Pants" | 2006 | Rough Trade: 30 Years of Rough Trade | From Reject All American. | |
