= Radical Act =

1995 documentary film

Radical Act is a feature-length documentary by Tex Clark. Shot in 1995, Radical Act documents the contributions of female artists to the 1990s indie rock scene. Participants include Kathleen Hanna (Bikini Kill, Le Tigre, Julie Ruin), Toshi Reagon, Gretchen Phillips, Melissa York (Team Dresch, Vitapup, The Butchies), Kim Coletta (Jawbox, co-owner of DeSoto Records), Shirlé Hale (Mary Lou Lord, Gerty, Womyn of Destruction), Sharon Topper (God is My Co-Pilot), journalist Evelyn McDonnell (Mamarama: A Memoir of Sex, Kids and Rock n Roll and Rock She Wrote: Women Write About Rock, Pop and Rap), author Victoria "Vicky" Starr ("KD Lang: All You Get Is Me") and Dr. Kay Turner (now Folk Arts Director of Brooklyn Arts Council).

Radical Act screened at the 1996 Outfest Film Festival in Los Angeles and was included in Miranda July's "Joanie For Jackie chainletter" collection of short films.
