= Rebel Girl (Bikini Kill song) =

Single by Bikini Kill

from the album Yeah Yeah Yeah Yeah and Pussy Whipped
- A-side: "New Radio" / "Rebel Girl"
- B-side: "Demirep"
- Released: 1993
- Genre: Punk rock • riot grrrl
- Length: 2:37
- Label: Kill Rock Stars
- Songwriters: Kathleen Hanna, Billy Karren, Tobi Vail, and Kathi Wilcox

"Rebel Girl" is a song by American punk rock band Bikini Kill. The song was released in three different recorded versions in 1993 – on an EP, an LP, and a 7-inch single. The single version was produced by Joan Jett and features her on guitar and background vocals. Widely considered a classic example of punk music, the song remains emblematic of the riot grrrl movement of the 1990s. In 2021, "Rebel Girl" was listed at number 296 on the updated list of Rolling Stone's 500 Greatest Songs of All Time.

== Music and lyrics ==
"Rebel Girl" is one of Bikini Kill's earliest original compositions, and was performed in concert as early as 1991. Songwriting credit is given to all four bandmembers. The lyrics are attributed to Hanna, and were reportedly inspired by the influential feminist artist Juliana Luecking.

The song's theme and lyrics overturn the traditional heterosexual tropes of pop music. Giving voice to an unconcealed lesbian perspective, it is a frank and explicit "tribute to, and love song for, another woman". In a larger sense, it is viewed as an ode to feminist solidarity. It is considered to be Bikini Kill's signature song, but it has an equally enduring affiliation with the feminist movement known as riot grrrl. From their start, Bikini Kill was inextricably linked to riot grrrl and, more than any other song, "Rebel Girl" was that movement's most widely recognized musical expression, its "one definitive anthem".

== Releases ==
Three different studio versions of "Rebel Girl" were recorded by Bikini Kill. The first version appeared on the split LP that the group shared with fellow riot grrrl band Huggy Bear in early 1993. Sporting front and back titles – Yeah Yeah Yeah Yeah for Bikini Kill's side, Our Troubled Youth for Huggy Bear's – the split LP was released by the independent label Kill Rock Stars and was only available on vinyl and cassette. This first version of "Rebel Girl" became available in CD format in 1994 when Kill Rock Stars packaged The CD Version of the First Two Records, a combination reissue that contained all seven songs of Yeah Yeah Yeah Yeah as well as the entirety of the band's vinyl debut, Bikini Kill.

The second version of the song appeared in late 1993 on the New Radio +2 single, a 3-song 7-inch vinyl record featuring both "New Radio" and "Rebel Girl" on the A-side, with "Demirep" on the flipside. Former Runaway and solo artist Joan Jett – an ardent early fan of the band – produced all three songs and provided additional guitar and background vocals. Jett toured with the band the next year. Engineering was by John Goodmanson of Kill Rock Stars. The cover art was created by local artist Heidi Arbogast, a former bandmate of Hanna. This second version of the song was included on the 1998 CD compilation, The Singles.

A third version of the song is on the band's first full-length album, Pussy Whipped. Engineering and production was handled by Stuart Hallerman of Avast! Recording Company in Seattle. Although this version had actually been recorded prior to the Jett-produced single, it was held for the album (slated for October 1993) and thus was released last chronologically.

== Critical reception ==
"The unforgettable anthem 'Rebel Girl'", as Robert Christgau calls it, was never a hit single, but it received widespread critical acclaim. It has been called a "classic", and praised as "some of the most vital rock-n-roll of the era". It was selected as the best song of 1993 on the Rolling Stone list of "Most Excellent Songs Of Every Year Since 1967", a playlist assembled by the magazine in 2006 to celebrate its 1,000th issue. Charles Aaron credits Hanna's vocal performance as the key ingredient, dazzling in its zigzags "from envy to lust to joy in the space of a verse".

Opinions vary about which version of the song is superior. Everett True called the Jett version "thrilling" and declared it a "Single of the Week" in Melody Maker. Of the Pussy Whipped version, critic Dave Thompson says it "wipes the floor" with the other takes.

== Cover versions ==
Recorded cover versions include: Lutefisk on their 1997 album Burn in Hell Fuckers, and The Wynona Riders, first recorded under the name Nation of Wenonah for the EP We Must Confront These Heresies (1996) and then released under their common name for the greatest hits package, How To Make An American Quit (2001). Electronic artist Kid606 used the song for his track of the same name on his 2002 mash-up album The Action Packed Mentallist Brings You the Fucking Jams. A cover version by singer Craig Owens of Chiodos was released as a digital-only charity single in 2013 to support the Girls Rock Camp Alliance and the Equal Rights Advocates. The Melvins and Teri Gender Bender together released a limited-edition cover version on vinyl through Joyful Noise Recordings in 2015. Mike Watt and The Black Gang released a live version of "Rebel Girl" for Record Store Day in 2013.

Billie Joe Armstrong of Green Day has stated that "Rebel Girl" was the primary inspiration for his own composition, "She's a Rebel" (2004).

In the 2021 American comedy-drama film Moxie the punk rock band The Linda Lindas covered "Rebel Girl", also performing the song on Jimmy Kimmel Live on June 3, 2021.

== In other media ==
Along with other tracks by Bikini Kill, Le Tigre, and the Julie Ruin, "Rebel Girl" is featured in the Kathleen Hanna biopic The Punk Singer (2013) and is included in the film's soundtrack, a digital-only release (2015). The song is also played in the women's rights documentary She's Beautiful When She's Angry (2014) and the independent comedy Itty Bitty Titty Committee (2007). The song is also played by Cameron Howe in the television show Halt and Catch Fire (2014–2017).

"Rebel Girl" is prominently employed in the television series Orange Is the New Black as a kind of theme song for Kate Mulgrew's character, Galina "Red" Reznikov. The song is also featured as part of the music video game Rock Band 2. In February of 2025, it was featured in an episode of Yellowjackets. The song was featured in the 2026 Pixar film Hoppers.

In February 2016, political counselor John Podesta tweeted a link to an unofficial, homemade video made by a supporter of Hillary Clinton. The video used "Rebel Girl" as the soundtrack for a partisan overview of Clinton's record on feminism and women's rights. Although the video had not been designed for wide release, Podesta's position as chairperson of the Clinton presidential campaign helped make it go viral. Amid mounting rumors that the Clinton campaign itself had created the video, Tobi Vail filed a copyright infringement claim against the user and had the video taken down. As Vail explained: "Bikini Kill is a collective, we collectively own our entire catalog including songwriting, so in order for a song to be used they need to have the permission of the whole band." With evident finality, she added: "We don't authorize use of our songs in advertisements."

== Credits ==
The members of Bikini Kill sometimes swapped their instruments for certain songs, but all versions of "Rebel Girl" were recorded with the band's standard arrangement:

- Kathleen Hanna – vocals
- Billy Karren – guitar
- Tobi Vail – drums, backing vocals
- Kathi Wilcox – bass guitar

On the single release, Joan Jett provides additional guitar and backing vocals.
