= Viva Knievel (band) =

American band

- Origin: Olympia
- Genres: Punk rock, Riot grrrl
- Years active: 1989-1990
- Past members: Zeb Olsen, Kathleen Hanna, Stu Olsen, Matt Zodrow

Viva Knievel was a short-lived punk rock and pre-riot grrrl band in Olympia, Washington, that existed around 1989–1990. Viva Knievel was Kathleen Hanna's second band, and included Zeb Olsen on bass, her brother, Stu, on guitar, and Matt Zodrow on drums. Kathleen's first band had been called "Amy Carter". Zeb, Stu, and Matt started playing punk rock in the early 80's and were in multiple bands before VK. Four Viva Knievel songs recorded in 1990 were released as a 7-inch EP on Cindy Wolfe's record label Ultrasound Records.

In 1989 Hanna came upon a copy of Tobi Vail's zine Jigsaw, and Hanna interviewed people while on tour with Viva Knievel in summer 1990 for inclusion in Jigsaw.

In 1990, Hanna, Karren, and Vail formed Bikini Kill with their friend Kathi Wilcox.
