= Don't Need You =

Don't Need You may refer to:

- "Don't Need You", a 1993 song from the split album Yeah Yeah Yeah Yeah by Bikini Kill
- "Don't Need You", a 2016 song by Bullet for My Valentine
- "Don't Need You", a 2020 song by Genesis Owusu

== See also ==
- "I Don't Need You"
