= Tammy Rae Carland =

American photographer, writer and filmmaker

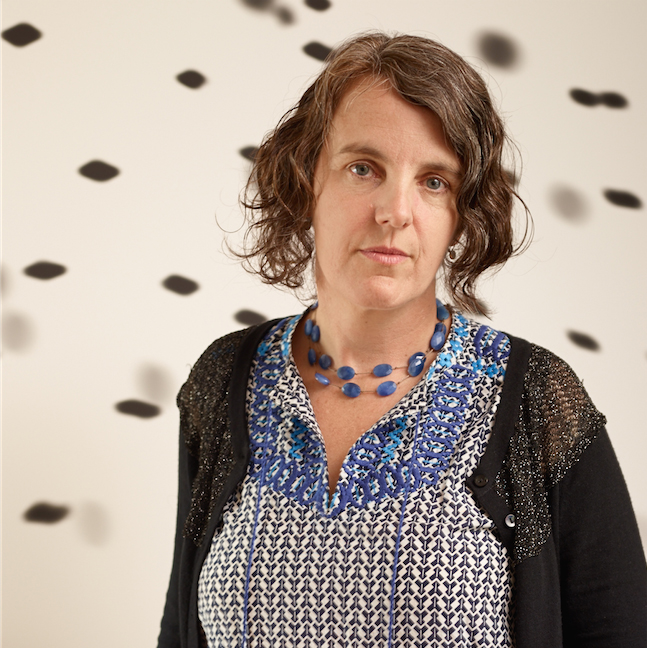
- Tammy Rae Carland in her studio, Oakland CA, 2014
- Born: Tammy Rae Carland; January 27, 1965 (age 61); Portland, Maine, United States
- Education: BA, Evergreen State College; MFA, University of California, Irvine
- Known for: Photography, Video art
- Notable work: Lesbian Beds, Odd Girl Out
- Movement: feminism

Tammy Rae Carland (born January 27, 1965), is an American photographer, video artist, zine editor, former provost at California College of the Arts (CCA), and former co-owner of the independent lesbian music label Mr. Lady Records and Videos. Her work has been published, screened, and exhibited around the world in galleries and museums in New York, Los Angeles, San Francisco, Berlin, and Sydney.

== Early life ==
Carland was born in Portland, Maine in 1965. She grew up with four siblings and was raised by her single mother. She was the first in her family to graduate from high school.

== Zines, videos, and music ==
In the late 1980s, while she was studying photography at Evergreen State College, Carland co-founded the independent art gallery Reko Muse (a.k.a. wreck-o-muse) in Olympia, Washington with fellow photography student, Kathleen Hanna and another friend, Heidi Arbogast. They formed a band, Amy Carter, which performed during art exhibitions. Kathleen Hanna often did spoken word performances at the gallery. Local band, Nirvana, led by Kurt Cobain, periodically played benefit shows to support the gallery.

After Amy Carter broke up, Carland remained friends with Hanna. She collaborated on the record art for Hanna’s band, Bikini Kill. Carland is also the namesake of the Bikini Kill song "For Tammy Rae" off the album Pussy Whipped. She also collaborated on album art for bands such as The Fakes and The Butchies.

Hanna contributed to Carland’s next project, the independently produced fanzine I (heart) Amy Carter. Other contributors included Donna Dresch of the queercore band Team Dresch. Carland’s zine writings have been republished in A Girl's Guide to Taking Over the World edited by Karen Green and Tristan Taormino and The Riot Grrrl Collection edited by Lisa Darms.

After the zine's demise, Carland turned her focus to photography and filmmaking. Excerpts from her film Lady Outlaws and Faggot Wannabes are included in the documentary film She's Real, Worse Than Queer by Lucy Thane, and Carland is also interviewed in this film. She has also been a contributor to Joanie4Jackie, a film compilation zine created by Miranda July, which featured Dear Mom and Becky 1977 in the first and second issues respectively. Her videos Live From Somewhere, Odd Girl Out, and Lady Outlaws and Faggot Wannabes have screened nationally and internationally.

From 1997-2005, Carland ran, in partnership, Mr. Lady Records and Videos. Mr. Lady was an independent record label and video distribution company dedicated to promoting feminist and queer culture. Mr. Lady released recordings by The Butchies, Kaia Wilson (Carland's ex-partner and Mr. Lady co-founder), and Le Tigre. Carland's name appears in the lyrics of the Le Tigre song "Hot Topic."

== Photography ==
Carland's photographs appear in the book The Passionate Camera: Photography and Bodies of Desire edited by Deborah Bright and Lesbian Art in America edited by Harmony Hammond. Carland has several bodies of work that have been shown in museums and galleries. She is currently represented by Jessica Silverman Gallery.

Carland has described herself as a maker rather than a documentarian, with regard to her art practice. In general, her photographs are carefully staged rather than captured in the moment. She has cited Bernd and Hilla Becher, Félix González-Torres and Imogen Cunningham as influences, especially on her "Lesbian Beds" series. The series contains photographs of her friends' unmade beds, all taken from the same aerial perspective, just minutes after being vacated. In the series "Horror Girls", Carland dresses up to recreate scenes and characters from horror movies. In "On Becoming: Billy and Katie 1964" Carland creates snapshot portraits of her dressed as her parents. "Photoback" is a series in which she photographed found photos that have captions hand written on the backs. "Keeping House" is a series Carland did with Kaia Wilson, staging scene from their home life together. The series "Post Partum Portraits" was created after Carland became a mother. Her series "Archive of Feelings" was featured in Alien She: Examining the lasting impact of Riot Grrrl, an exhibition held at the Yerba Buena Center for the Arts and the Orange County Museum of Art.

== Teaching ==
Carland was Provost at California College of the Arts. She is also a Professor of Photography and Fine Arts. Carland has also taught at University of North Carolina at Chapel Hill and DePauw University.
