= The C.D. Version of the First Two Records =

Compilation album by Bikini Kill
- Released: March 4, 1994
- Recorded: 1991–1992
- Genre: Punk rock
- Label: Kill Rock Stars

Bikini Kill chronology
Pussy Whipped (1993)	The C.D. Version of the First Two Records (1994)	Reject All American (1996)

Bikini Kill compilation album chronology
The C.D. Version of the First Two Records (1994)	The Singles (1998)

The C.D. Version of the First Two Records (released on cassette as The Tape Version of the First Two Records) is a compilation by punk rock band Bikini Kill, collecting their 1992 eponymous EP and their half of the 1993 EP Yeah Yeah Yeah Yeah, an album they shared with the band Huggy Bear. It was released in 1994 on Kill Rock Stars and was the first Bikini Kill release on CD. The album was re-released by Bikini Kill Records on June 23, 2015 as simply The First Two Records and featured additional tracks from the expanded re-release of Yeah Yeah Yeah Yeah.

== Critical reception ==
Professional ratings
Review scores
Source	Rating
AllMusic	4/5 stars
The Rolling Stone Album Guide	4/5 stars
Spin Alternative Record Guide	8/10

In its review, AllMusic suggests that the album and its "even noisier follow-up, Pussy Whipped, might be all the Bikini Kill one needs". Characterizing the compilation as "[a]ggressive, lippy, and none-too-disciplined", Rough Guides reviewer Owen James noted that it "nonetheless managed to sound like a triumph of female bonding against the odds". Rolling Stone described it as "caustic, daring, and shamelessly didactic, a two-by-four to the chops of patriarchy".

== Track listing ==
All tracks are written by Kathleen Hanna, Billy Karren, Tobi Vail, and Kathi Wilcox.

No.	Title	Length
1.	"Double Dare Ya"	2:40
2.	"Liar"	2:35
3.	"Carnival"	1:30
4.	"Suck My Left One"	2:24
5.	"Feels Blind"	3:21
6.	"Thurston Hearts the Who"	3:45
7.	"White Boy"	2:26
8.	"This Is Not a Test"	1:59
9.	"Don't Need You"	1:27
10.	"Jigsaw Youth"	1:55
11.	"Resist Psychic Death"	1:40
12.	"Rebel Girl"	2:47
13.	"Outta Me"	2:22

=== Re-release expanded tracks ===
No.	Title	Length
14.	"George Bush is a Pig"	1:52
15.	"I Busted in Your Chevy Window"	0:58
16.	"Get Out"	1:34
17.	"Why"	2:22
18.	"Fuck Twin Peaks"	1:58
19.	"Girl Soldier"	4:15
20.	"Not Right Now"	3:30

== Personnel ==
=== Performance ===
- Kathleen Hanna – vocals
- Billy Karren – guitar
- Tobi Vail – drums, vocals
- Kathi Wilcox – bass guitar

=== Production ===
- Pat Graham — photography
- Tim Green — engineer
- Ian MacKaye — engineer
- Patrick Maley — engineer
- Don Zientara — engineer
