= Mimi Thi Nguyen =

Vietnamese-American scholar

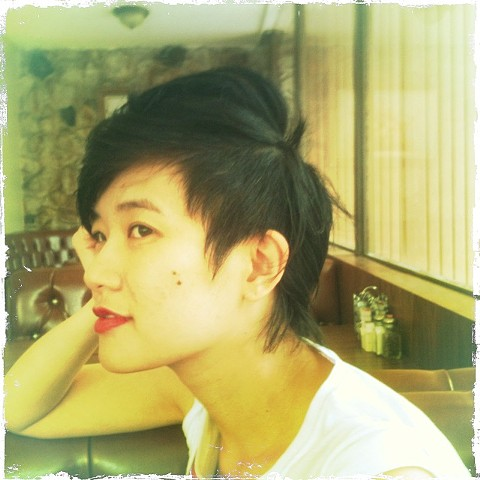
- Born: Thanh-Huong Thi Nguyen; June 22, 1974 (age 52); Saigon, South Vietnam
- Education: University of California, Berkeley
- Occupations: Professor of Gender & Women’s Studies and Asian American Studies
- Writing career
- Notable work: Evolution of a Race Riot zine
- Website: mimithinguyen.com

Mimi Thi Nguyen (née Thanh-Huong Thi Nguyen; born in 1974) is a Vietnamese-born American scholar, punk and zine author.

== Biography ==
Born in 1974 in Saigon (now called Ho Chi Minh City) to Hiep and Lien Nguyen, Nguyen earned a bachelor's degree in Women's Studies and a doctorate in Ethnic Studies from University of California, Berkeley. Her master's degree was in American Studies from New York University. She grew up in Minnesota and relocated to San Diego, California, where she was drawn to the D.I.Y. punk scene.

Appointed in Gender and Women's Studies and Asian American Studies, Nguyen earned tenure in 2012 at the University of Illinois at Urbana–Champaign. She received the Outstanding Book Award in Cultural Studies from the Association of Asian American Studies, 2014 for her first single-author monograph, The Gift of Freedom: War, Debt and Other Refugee Passages. Nguyen joined the Women's, Gender, and Sexuality Studies faculty at Dartmouth college in the 2025-2026 academic year.

Nguyen is possibly best known for her compilation zine Evolution of a Race Riot first published in 1997 with a second issue in 2002, in which she and contributors of color challenged racism in the punk scene. She also publishes the zine Slander and is a former Punk Planet columnist and Maximumrocknroll contributor. In June 2013, Sarah McCarry's Guillotine ("a series of erratically published chapbooks focused on revolutionary non-fiction") released PUNK, a conversation between Nguyen and Golnar Nikpour, which later informed a 2016 exhibition at the Arnolfini called "Moving Targets."

Nguyen also cofounded a fashion blog with Minh-Ha T. Pham that discusses the politics, history, and aesthetics of beauty and fashion.

== Riot Grrrl ==
Nguyen lists the Riot Grrrl movement as one that is important and yet problematic. In her essay "Riot Grrrl, Race, and Revival", Nguyen discusses the work which the Riot Grrrl movement has done in calling attention to how a woman's personal experiences with sexual abuse, heteronormativity, and intimacy with other women are tied up with the political and social. Collectivity among women being one of Riot Grrrl's goals, Nguyen addresses race as an obstacle to that collectivity, highlighting the marginalization of women of color.

== Evolution of a Race Riot zine ==
Nguyen created Evolution of a Race Riot as a compilation zine based in North America. Nguyen originally put out the first flier for zine submissions in August 1995 and the first issue was published in 1997. The entire zine is written by people of color mostly in the punk and Riot Grrrl scene. According to Nguyen in her introduction to the first issue of the zine, most of the submissions are written by mixed race or Asian-American people of color.

== Selected works ==
=== Books ===
- Alien Encounters: Popular Culture in Asian America, edited with Thuy Linh Nguyen Tu 2007
- The Gift of Freedom: War, Debt, and Other Refugee Passages 2012
- The Promise Of Beauty 2024
- Bangtan Remixed: A Critical BTS Reader with Patty Ahn, Michelle Cho, Vernadette Vicuna Gonzalez, Rani Neutill, and Yutian Wong 2024

=== Zines ===
- Aim Your Dick
- Evolution of a Race Riot, editor
- Guillotine Series #4: Punk, written with Golnar Nikpour
- Pander Mafia, editor
- Race Riot, editor
- Race Riot Project Directory, editor
- Slander
- Slant
- Sometimes Buddhist Keanu: A Coloring Book

=== Other Creative Non-Fiction ===
- The Government Might Not Love You, But I Do 2019
- Trans Studies Syllabus for Bullshit Times with Toby Beauchamp, Sawyer K. Kemp, Ava L.J. Kim, and Damian Vergara Bracamontes 2023
