= Julie Ruin =

Studio album by Julie Ruin (Kathleen Hanna)
- Released: September 29, 1998
- Recorded: 1997
- Genres: Electronic; riot grrrl; lo-fi; hip hop
- Length: 40:05
- Label: Kill Rock Stars

Julie Ruin is the debut solo album by Kathleen Hanna (under the pseudonym Julie Ruin), released on September 29, 1998, through Kill Rock Stars. She recorded the album in 1997 whilst taking a break from Bikini Kill. Hanna recalled:

[It] was made as Bikini Kill was in breaking up, a guy who worked across the street from my apartment building was stalking me and I was being treated, in my own community, like a historical oddity. The solo record helped me remember that I was just a fucking person who liked being creative.

She cited two albums, Girl Talk by Lesley Gore and Delete Yourself by Atari Teenage Riot, among the inspirations for hers. In addition to feminism, it touches upon crocheting, aerobics and resisting police abuse. It was mostly produced in Hanna's apartment in Olympia, Washington. She declared:

Girls' bedrooms sometimes can be this space of real creativity. The problem is that these bedrooms are all cut off from each other. I wanted the Julie Ruin record to sound like a girl from her bedroom made this record but then didn't just throw it away or it wasn't just in her diary but she took it out and shared it with people.

Hanna started collaborating with her friends Sadie Benning and Johanna Fateman to create a live band to perform songs from the album. This group would go on to become Le Tigre.

In December 2010, Hanna and former Bikini Kill bandmate Kathi Wilcox formed a band called the Julie Ruin.

== Critical reception ==
Professional ratings
Review scores
Source	Rating
AllMusic	4/5 stars
Pitchfork	6.7/10
The Rolling Stone Album Guide	2/5 stars
Spin	6/10
The Village Voice	B−

The New York Times noted the "charmingly unruly jumble of sounds and influences: the cheesy tick of a drum machine up against the manic buzz of electric guitar, the frenzied spirit of punk overlapping the demure coo of 60's girl groups."

== Track listing ==
No.	Title	Length
1.	"Radical or Pro-Parental"	2:15
2.	"V.G.I."	3:48
3.	"A Place Called Won't Be There"	2:52
4.	"Tania"	2:41
5.	"Aerobicide"	2:54
6.	"Apt. #5"	3:13
7.	"My Morning Is Summer"	3:15
8.	"I Wanna Know What Love Is"	3:36
9.	"The Punk Singer"	2:07
10.	"On Language"	2:06
11.	"Crochet"	2:01
12.	"Interlude"	0:51
13.	"Stay Monkey"	2:56
14.	"Breakout a Town"	2:22
15.	"Love Letter"	3:08

== Samples ==
- "V.G.I." samples "Tired of Waiting for You" by the Kinks.
- "I Wanna Know What Love Is" samples "The Guns of Brixton" by the Clash.
- "On Language" samples American Woman by The Guess Who
- "Stay Monkey" samples "I'm Coolin', No Foolin'" by Lesley Gore.
- "Breakout A-Town" samples "It's All I Can Do" by the Cars.
- "Love Letter" samples "I'm So Bored with the USA" by the Clash.
