= Kathleen Hanna =

American musician and feminist activist (born 1968)

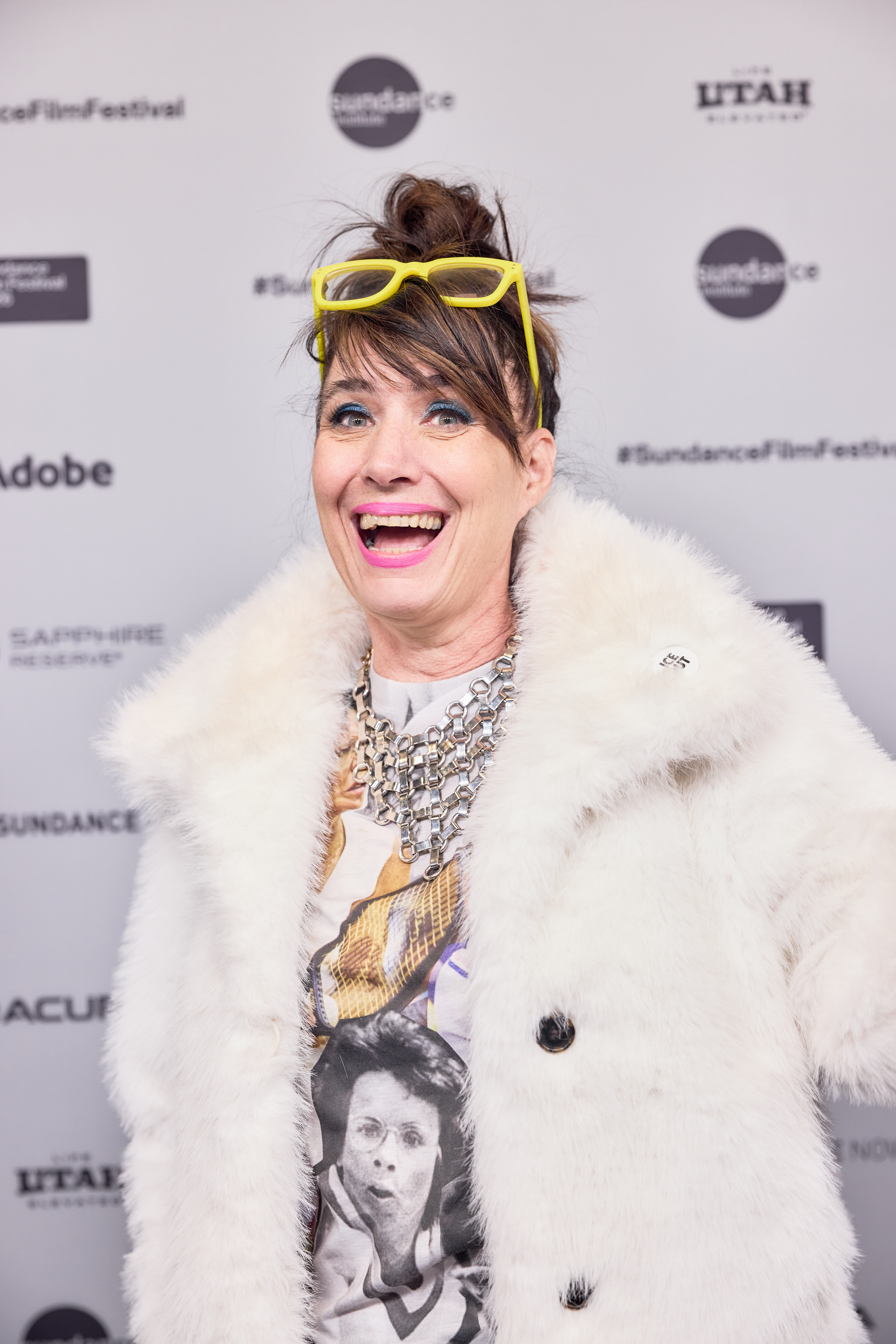
- Hanna in 2026
- Born: November 12, 1968 (age 58); Portland, Oregon, U.S.
- Other name: Julie Ruin
- Education: The Evergreen State College
- Occupations: Musician; activist; writer
- Spouse: Adam Horovitz (m. 2006)
- Children: 1
- Musical career
- Origin: Olympia, Washington, U.S.
- Genres: Punk rock; riot grrrl; art punk
- Instruments: Vocals; guitar; bass; sampler; drums; drum machine
- Years active: 1989–present
- Label: Kill Rock Stars
- Member of: The Julie Ruin; Bikini Kill; Le Tigre
- Formerly of: Viva Knievel; Suture

Kathleen Hanna (born November 12, 1968) is an American singer, musician and pioneer of the feminist punk riot grrrl movement, and punk zine writer. She is the lead singer of feminist punk band Bikini Kill and fronts the electropunk band Le Tigre. She has also recorded as the Julie Ruin.

In 2009, Hanna made her zines, art pieces, photography, video, music, journals, and other material which focus on the early formation of the Riot Grrrl movement available at the Fales Library at New York University. A documentary film about Hanna was released in 2013 by director Sini Anderson, titled The Punk Singer, detailing Hanna's life and career, as well as revealing her years-long battle with Lyme disease. Hanna is married to Adam Horovitz of the Beastie Boys.

== Education ==
Hanna attended Lincoln High School and Grant High School. Later, she attended The Evergreen State College in the late 1980s as a first-generation college student. "My parents didn't go to college. I felt lucky [to attend]."

== Life and career ==
=== 1968–1988: Early life and feminism ===
Kathleen Hanna was born on November 12, 1968, in Portland, Oregon. Her mother was a psychiatric nurse. At age three, her family moved to Calverton, Maryland; as Hanna's father changed occupations, the family moved several more times. Hanna's parents divorced when she was young due to her father's alcoholism. Hanna first became interested in feminism around the age of nine, after her mother took her to a rally in Washington, D.C. where feminist icon Gloria Steinem spoke. In a 2000 interview with BUST magazine, Hanna recalled: "My mom was a housewife and wasn't somebody that people would think of as a feminist, and when Ms. magazine came out we were incredibly inspired by it. I used to cut pictures out of it and make posters that said 'Girls can do anything', and stuff like that, and my mom was inspired to work at a basement of a church doing anti-domestic violence work. Then she took me to the Solidarity Day thing, and it was the first time I had ever been in a big crowd of women yelling, and it really made me want to do it forever."

Hanna's interest grew when her mother checked out a copy of Betty Friedan's The Feminine Mystique from the library. Their involvement in the women's rights movement was done quietly during Hanna's childhood, due to her father's disapproval.

Upon her parents' divorce, Hanna returned to Portland and later worked as a stripper to pay her college tuition at The Evergreen State College, where she and fellow student and photographer Aaron Baush-Greene, she set up a photo exhibit featuring the pair's photography, which dealt with sexism, violence against women, and AIDS – issues that were heightened for Hanna when she volunteered for SafePlace, a domestic violence organization. However, the school administrators took the photos down before they had the chance to be viewed, an act of censorship that prompted what Hanna refers to as her "first foray into activism": the creation of Reko Muse, an independent feminist art gallery, with friends Heidi Arbogast and Tammy Rae Carland.

Hanna began doing spoken word performances that addressed sexism and violence against women. Eventually, she abandoned spoken word in favor of music after a conversation with one of her favorite writers, countercultural icon Kathy Acker. Hanna recalled,

Acker asked me why writing was important to me, and I said, 'Because I felt like I'd never been listened to and I had a lot to say,' and she said, 'Then why are you doing spoken word—no one goes to spoken word shows! You should get in a band.'

Hanna then formed a band with Arbogast and Carland, called "Amy Carter", which put on shows before the art exhibitions.

=== 1989–present: Bikini Kill ===
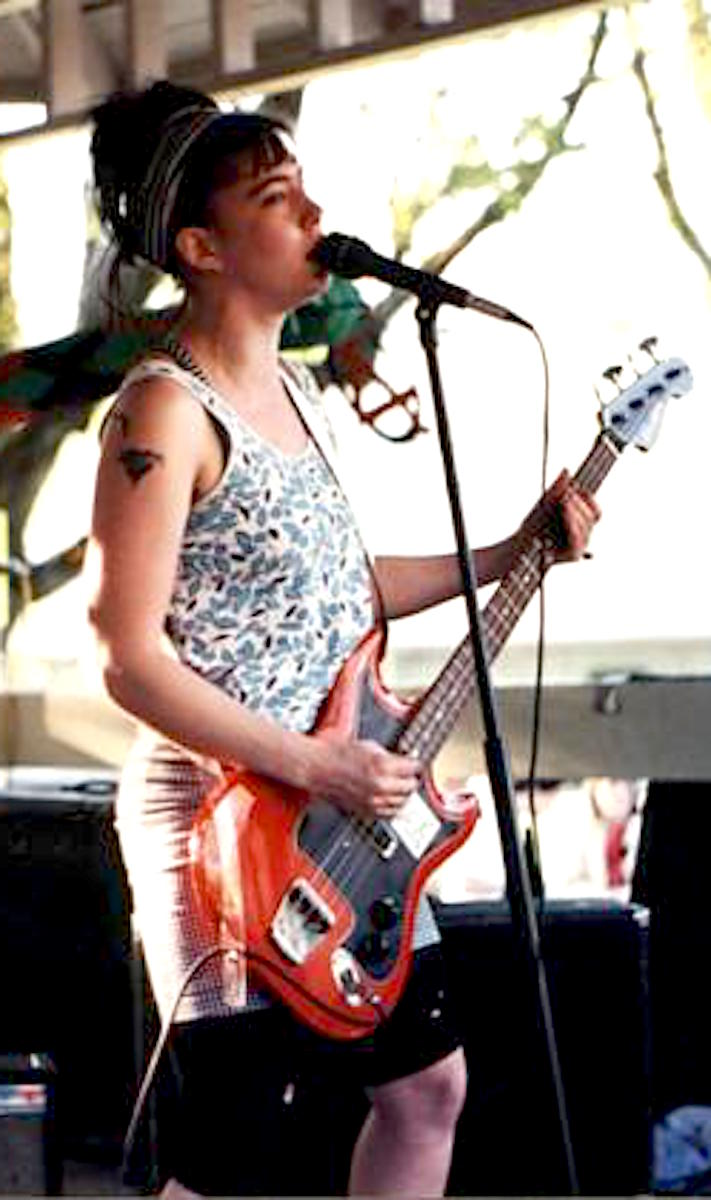
Hanna performing with Bikini Kill in 1991

Later, Hanna started another band called Viva Knievel that toured the United States for two months before disbanding. Upon returning to Olympia in 1990, Hanna began collaborating with Evergreen student, drummer and punk zinester Tobi Vail after seeing a performance of the Go Team (a band made up of Vail, Billy Karren, and Calvin Johnson) and recognizing Vail as the mastermind behind the fanzine Jigsaw that Hanna greatly admired and loved. In October 1990, Hanna and Vail joined with Karren and bassist Kathi Wilcox to form Bikini Kill, which soon became part of the seminal early-1990s Olympia, Washington music scene. One goal of the band was to inspire more women to join the male-dominated punk scene. While Bikini Kill were in Washington, D.C. during summer 1991, Hanna recorded with two side projects, which were featured on the compilation cassette A Wonderful Treat: Suture (with Sharon Cheslow and Dug E. Bird), and Wondertwins (with Tim Green of Nation of Ulysses). Bikini Kill, Suture, and Wondertwins all performed at the International Pop Underground Convention in August 1991.

Bikini Kill's first release for the Kill Rock Stars label was a self-titled EP produced by Ian MacKaye of Fugazi. Bikini Kill then toured the UK, recording a split LP with UK band Huggy Bear. This tour was filmed and the band was interviewed by Lucy Thane for her documentary, It Changed My Life: Bikini Kill in the UK. Upon returning to the U.S., the band began working with Joan Jett, who produced their single "New Radio/Rebel Girl". After the single's release, Hanna began co-writing songs with Jett for her new album. At the same time, Hanna recorded her spoken-word "Rockstar", released on a 7-inch single in the Kill Rock Stars "Wordcore" series; and "I Wish I Was Him", which appears on the KRS compilation Rock Stars Kill. The song, written by Ben Lee about alternative rock heartthrob Evan Dando, was originally recorded by Lee's band Noise Addict.

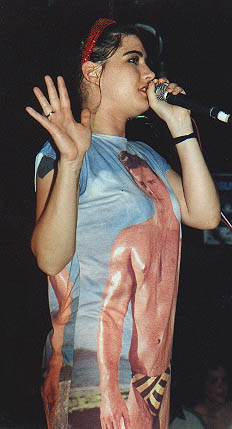
Hanna performing with Bikini Kill, 1996

The first two Bikini Kill EPs were released on CD as The C.D. Version of the First Two Records in 1993. The band released two more full-length albums, Pussy Whipped in 1994 and Reject All American in 1996, and in 1998, Kill Rock Stars released Bikini Kill: The Singles, a collection of the group's seven-inch and compilation tracks. Bikini Kill is actively touring to date.

=== 2000–present: Le Tigre and the Julie Ruin ===
After Bikini Kill's breakup, Hanna began working on a solo project called Julie Ruin. The project was created entirely in Hanna's bedroom using a $40 drum machine. One self-titled album was released under the Julie Ruin pseudonym, and was partially inspired by the work of feminist theorist Julia Kristeva.

Hanna said of the project:

Girls' bedrooms sometimes can be this space of real creativity. The problem is that these bedrooms are all cut off from each other. I wanted the Julie Ruin record to sound like a girl from her bedroom made this record but then didn't just throw it away or it wasn't just in her diary but she took it out and shared it with people.

While in Portland, Oregon, Hanna began working with friend and then-zine editor Johanna Fateman on a live show for Julie Ruin. The collaboration resulted in the two briefly forming a band called the Troublemakers, named after a G. B. Jones film, which ended when Fateman relocated to New York City to attend art school.

Hanna soon moved to New York City, and with the addition of filmmaker Sadie Benning, they started another band called Le Tigre based upon a more electronic style of music, similar to the sampler-driven sound Hanna had begun to explore with Julie Ruin. (She later revealed to Bust magazine that she was "totally broke" at this time and ate oatmeal daily.) Hanna refers to it as part of a "Punk Feminist Electronic genre". The band recorded for the Mr. Lady Records label, its first recording being an eponymous album which included the singles "Hot Topic" and "Deceptacon." Benning then left the band and was replaced by JD Samson for their second album, Feminist Sweepstakes.

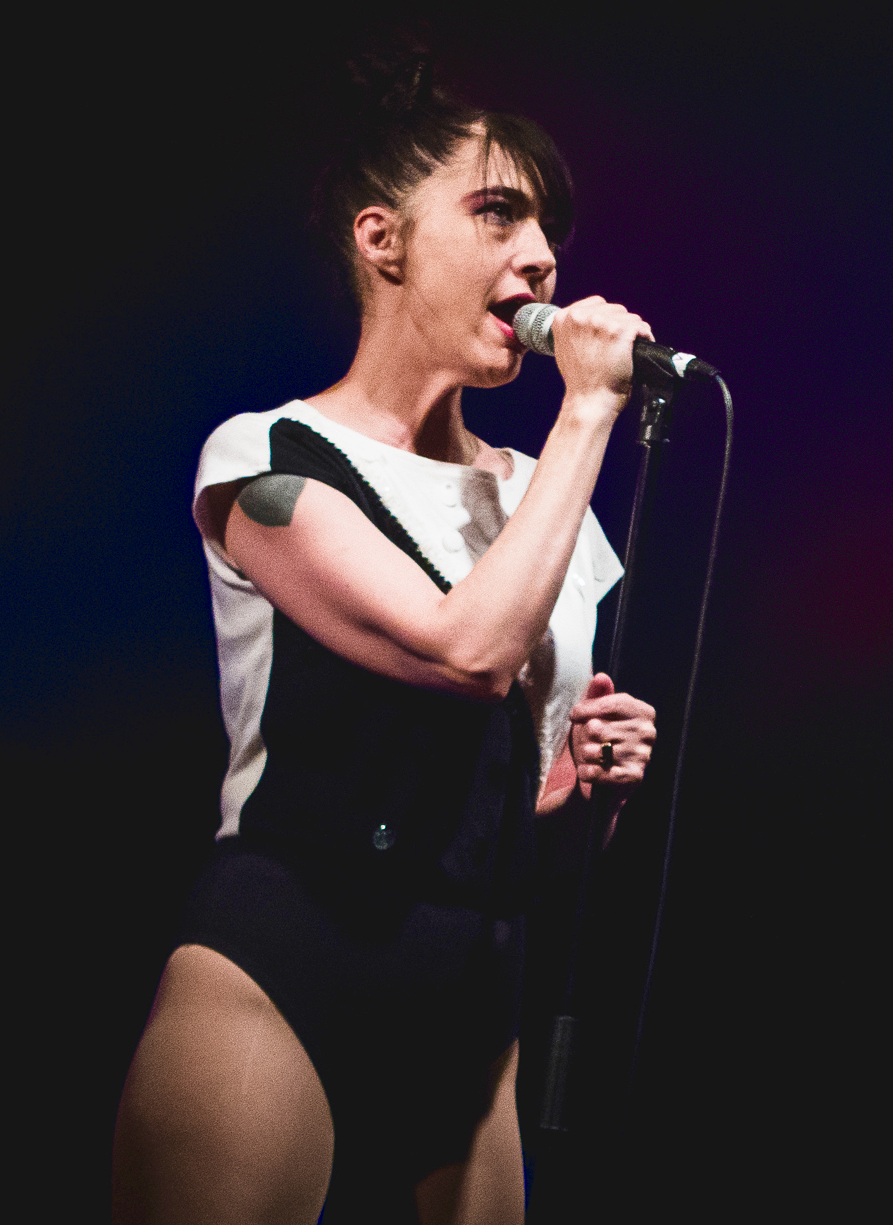
Hanna performing in London, 2016

Mr. Lady Records folded, and the group switched to Universal Records for the 2004 release of This Island. Hanna left the band in 2005 due to illness; she was later diagnosed with late-stage Lyme disease. According to the Le Tigre website, during her time off from the band, Hanna volunteered as a band coach for the Willie Mae Rock and Roll Camp for Girls. She also taught an art class at NYU's graduate school in the Fall 2007 semester and attended interior design classes. In 2010, Hanna DJed at the Museum of Modern Art, later joining the Raincoats on stage to cover the Slits' Vindictive.

Also in 2010, Hanna announced she was rebuilding her 1997 act Julie Ruin, turning it into a full band called the Julie Ruin with Kenny Mellman and Kathi Wilcox, and that they would be creating a new record. The band played their first show at Knitting Factory in New York City which included songs from Bikini Kill and Le Tigre, and one new composition. From 2010 to 2013, director Sini Anderson worked on a documentary on Kathleen Hanna titled The Punk Singer, documenting her works from Bikini Kill to the Julie Ruin. It premiered at SXSW in 2013. In June 2013, Julie Ruin released its first single, "Oh Come On". An album, Run Fast was released in September 2013 with the band going on tour. The band cancelled the tour planned for May to September 2014 due to Hanna's Lyme disease deteriorating. She has since recovered and begun performing again. The Julie Ruin's second album, Hit Reset, was published in July 2016 by Hardly Art.

== Activism and impact ==
Hanna's outspoken feminism has always influenced her work. She became a voice for third-wave feminism and the Riot Grrrl movement in 1991. In 1991, Bikini Kill spent the summer in Washington, D.C., where Hanna began collaborating with Allison Wolfe, Molly Neuman, and Jen Smith from the band Bratmobile on the zine Riot grrrl, which became a call to action for young women to embrace feminism and equal female involvement in the punk rock scene.

We wanted to start a magazine, and Allison Wolfe and Molly Neuman from the band Bratmobile had started a little fanzine called riot grrrl and we were writing little things for it. I'd always wanted to start a big magazine with really cool, smart writing in it, and I wanted to see if the other punk girls in D.C. that I was meeting were interested in that. So I called a meeting and found a space for it, and it just turned into this sort of consciousness-raising thing. I realized really quickly that a magazine wasn't the way to go. People wanted to be having shows, and teaching each other how to play music, and writing fanzines, so that started happening. It got some press attention, and girls in other places would be like "I wanna do that. I wanna start one of those."

The zines "cover[ed] strategies for safety in the mosh pit", "exploration of political ideas", and creating a collective for punk feminist women. The Bikini Kill Zine, which began in 1991, was born from this, along with the desire to present "feminist issues through a punk rock lens." By Issue Two, the Riot Grrrl Manifesto was born, urging women to defy society's expectations upon them as women, and to form a collective for women to freely discuss current issues. While Hanna never sought nor intended to become the spokeswoman for Riot Grrl, she hoped that it would provide a voice for issues that are relevant to women on local, national, and global levels.

At Bikini Kill concerts, Hanna would ask women to move to the front of the stage to avoid harassment from males, as part of her idea of "girls to the front' or "Revolution Girl Style Now." In a mostly male-dominated punk rock scene where shows often turned violent because of mosh pits (where women were often assaulted), Hanna wanted space for women to be able to feel safe. Additionally, with a barrier of girls in the front rows, she too could feel safe and supported at her own shows, where male hecklers were constantly present.

Her feminist contributions to punk music are also evident in her lyrics. In an interview with Nicole Brodeur from The Seattle Times, it is said that, "Hanna's lyrics were about girls who did and wore what they wanted, despite societal expectations." Hanna: "It doesn't mean you're not a feminist because you expose your legs." She zeroed in on the idea that women should have the ability to express themselves in any way they please, without backlash, and her performances regularly reflected such themes. Brodeur: "Hanna exposed her breasts and rear-end with lust-killing bluntness; she wore a girlish ponytail and danced around with 'slut' written in lipstick across her midriff."

In 1991, Hanna performed with Bikini Kill (alongside Fugazi) at the Pro-Choice Rally at the National Mall in Washington, D.C. before the Planned Parenthood v. Casey trial. Having had an abortion herself at 15, Hanna said: "It's about women not dying in back-alley abortions, but it's also about women saying: 'My life is worth it, too. I deserve to have control over my life and my health care.' Imagine if a man was told, 'You can't make the decision to have a vasectomy.'" Hanna also spoke at the 2011 Planned Parenthood "Stand Up for Women's Health" Rally. During her speech, she told her story of when she was 19 years old, on tour, and broke. She had acquired an infection, was extremely ill, and walked into a Planned Parenthood clinic for help. Despite having less than $10 in her pocket, she was "met with open arms" at the clinic, was treated with respect, and received medical care.

Hanna contributed the piece "Gen X Survivor: From Riot Grrrl Rock Star to Feminist Artist" to the 2003 anthology Sisterhood Is Forever: The Women's Anthology for a New Millennium, edited by Robin Morgan. The riot grrrl genre, to which Hanna was central, has been credited as a historical site for the empowerment of women by such documentaries as The Punk Singer, which credits Hanna with having molded many tenets of third-wave feminism.

In 2009, the Fales Library at New York University created a Riot Grrrl Collection which focuses on the early formation of the Riot Grrrl movement, and has a series of zines, art pieces, photography, video, music, journals, and more. Some of Hanna's solo work, along with zines that she has created with Bikini Kill and other collaborators are also included. The Bikini Kill archive is also available online.

In a 2014 interview with Amy Middleton of Australian webzine Archer, Hanna stated that she supported marriage equality. Hanna also noted that while on tour with Le Tigre, she met teenagers who had told her of starting LGBT groups and gay/straight alliances in their high schools; she said, "Hearing that made me feel so hopeful for the future". In the same interview, Hanna stated she was saddened by trans-exclusionary feminist movements, and appeared to support transfeminism. Previously, critics had suggested Hanna was trans-exclusionary for having performed at the Michigan Womyn's Music Festival in 2001 and 2005, which had a policy of exclusively allowing "womyn-born-womyn" into the event.

In 2018, Hanna started "Tees 4 Togo", a project which sells t-shirts with drawings of Hanna's friends such as Kim Gordon, Patton Oswalt, Joan Jett, and Chuck D, along with artists such as Sarah Larnach, Adee Roberson, and Hannah Lucy. 100% of the proceeds go to the non-profit Peace Sisters, which helps fund local girls' school tuition costs in Dapaong, Togo. The cost of one $40 shirt funds an entire school year for a student.

== Personal life ==
Hanna identified as bisexual in a 1993 Out article, while a 2013 Pride.com article described her as "a vocal ally of the gay community".

Hanna met rapper Adam Horovitz of the Beastie Boys in 1995, at a concert where their respective bands were playing. They began dating after his separation from Ione Skye and married in 2006. Hanna and Horovitz adopted a son in 2013.

Hanna suffered from Lyme disease for six years before it was correctly diagnosed, resulting in repeated seizures. The disease forced her to take a break from performing and enter a three-month course of treatment in 2014. In 2013 in Bust magazine she revealed that Horovitz "took care of me throughout the whole thing." By June 2015, she described herself as in remission.

== In popular culture ==
- Hanna was the source of the title of Nirvana's 1991 breakthrough single "Smells Like Teen Spirit", having written "Kurt Smells Like Teen Spirit" on Kurt Cobain's wall. At the time, Cobain was unaware that Hanna was referring to a deodorant marketed specifically to young women, and thought that the phrase would anchor the song's theme.
- She appears in the music video for Sonic Youth's song "Bull in the Heather".
- She collaborated with Kristen Anderson-Lopez and Robert Lopez for the 1990s style sitcom intro theme song in the Marvel Studios series WandaVision.
- Hanna appears twice in the 2020 documentary film The Go-Go's that premiered at the 2020 Sundance Film Festival and was broadcast on Showtime later that year. In it, she recalls attending a Go-Go's concert in 1982 and the impact it had on her.
- A documentary film about Hanna was released in 2013 by director Sini Anderson, titled The Punk Singer, detailing Hanna's life and career, as well as her years-long battle with Lyme disease.

== Discography ==
=== Bikini Kill ===
==== Albums ====
- Revolution Girl Style Now! self-released cassette (1991)
- Bikini Kill EP, Kill Rock Stars (1991)
- Yeah Yeah Yeah Yeah split LP with Huggy Bear, Catcall Records (UK), Kill Rock Stars (US) (1993)
- Pussy Whipped, Kill Rock Stars (1993)
- The C.D. Version of the First Two Records (compilation of the Bikini Kill EP and their half of the Yeah Yeah Yeah Yeah split LP), Kill Rock Stars (1994)
- Reject All American, Kill Rock Stars (1996)
- The Singles, Kill Rock Stars (1998)

==== Singles ====
- "New Radio"/"Rebel Girl" 7-inch single, Kill Rock Stars (1993)
- "The Anti-Pleasure Dissertation" 7-inch single, Kill Rock Stars (1994)
- "I Like Fucking"/"I Hate Danger" 7-inch single, Kill Rock Stars (1995)

==== Compilation appearances ====
- "Feels Blind" on Kill Rock Stars LP/CD (1991)
- "Candy" on Throw: The Yoyo Studio Compilation, Yoyo Records (1991)
- "Daddy's Lil' Girl" on Give Me Back LP, Ebullition Records (1991)
- "Suck My Left One" on There's a Dyke in the Pit, Outpunk Records (1992)

=== Julie Ruin ===
- Julie Ruin, Kill Rock Stars (1998)

=== The Julie Ruin ===
- Run Fast, TJR Records (2013)
- Hit Reset, Hardly Art (2016)

=== Le Tigre ===
==== Albums ====
- Le Tigre, Mr. Lady (1999)
- Feminist Sweepstakes, Mr. Lady (2001)
- This Island, Universal (2004)

==== Singles and EPs ====
- "Hot Topic" (1999)
- From the Desk of Mr. Lady EP (2001)
- Remix (2003)
- "New Kicks (2004)
- "TKO" (2004)
- "After Dark" (2005)
- This Island Remixes Volume 1 EP, Chicks on Speed Records (2005)
- This Island Remixes Volume 2 EP, Chicks on Speed Records (2005)
- "Standing in the Way of Control" 12-inch split EP with the Gossip, Kill Rock Stars (2006)
- "I'm with Her" (2016)

=== Miscellaneous ===
==== Viva Knievel ====
- "Boy Poison" 7-inch EP, Ultrasound Records (1990)

==== Suture ====
- A Wonderful Treat compilation cassette (1991)
- "Suture" 7-inch EP, Decomposition/Dischord (1992)

==== The Fakes ====
- Real Fiction LP, Kill Rock Stars (1995)

=== Solo and guest appearances ===
- Rock Star/Mean (Wordcore Volume 1), Kathleen Hanna and Slim Moon, Kill Rock Stars (1991)
- Play Pretty for Baby, the Nation of Ulysses (1992); includes backing vocals by Hanna
- Rock Stars Kill, Various Artists, Kill Rock Stars (1994); includes Hanna's "I Wish I Was Him"
- Ball-Hog or Tugboat? LP/CD, Mike Watt (1995); Hanna is featured on the song "Heartbeat"
- Home Alive: The Art of Self Defense, Various Artists, Epic (1996); includes "Go Home", written and performed with Joan Jett and Evil Stig
- 60 second wipe out, Atari Teenage Riot (1999); Hanna is featured on lead vocals on the song "No Success"
- Featuring... LP, Internal/External, K Records (2000)
- Playgroup, Playgroup (2001); Hanna is featured on lead vocals on the song "Bring It On"
- Realistes, Comet Gain (2002); Hanna is featured on the song "Ripped-Up Suit"
- "Wordy Rappinghood", Chicks on Speed (2003); features Hanna on vocals
- Naked, Joan Jett (2004); "Kiss on the Lips" is a duet with Hanna
- American Idiot, Green Day (2004); the song "Letterbomb" begins with vocals by Hanna as the character Whatsername
- Sinner, Joan Jett (2007); Hanna contributes to the songs "Five", "Watersign", "Baby Blue" and "Tube Talkin"
- Hey Hey My My Yo Yo, Junior Senior (2007); Hanna is featured on the song "Dance, Chance, Romance"
- "Eating Makeup", Seth Bogart (2016); features vocals by Hanna
- Chill, dummy, P.O.S (2017); Hanna is featured on the song "Sleepdrone/Superposition"
- Phosphorescent Panic, Chelsea Peretti (2020); Hanna is featured on "BDR"
- "Let's Keep It Going", Kristen Anderson-Lopez and Robert Lopez (2021); features vocals by Hanna

== Bibliography ==
=== Fanzines ===
- My life with Evan Dando: Popstar
- The Kathleen Hanna newsletter
- Le Tigre zine/tour program

=== Memoir ===
- Hanna, Kathleen (May 14, 2024). Rebel Girl. New York: Ecco. ISBN 978-0-06-282523-0.

== Sources ==
- Azerrad, Michael (2001). Come as You Are: The Story of Nirvana. Doubleday. ISBN 0-385-47199-8. OCLC 49040415.
- Buckley, Peter (November 20, 2003). The Rough Guide to Rock (third revised ed.). Rough Guides. ISBN 1-84353-105-4. OCLC 890370405.
- Robbins, Ira; Wolk, Douglas (1997), The Trouser Press Guide to '90s Rock, New York: Fireside, ISBN 0-684-81437-4
