= The Singles (Bikini Kill album) =

Compilation album by Bikini Kill
- Released: June 23, 1998
- Genre: Punk rock
- Length: 17:24
- Label: Kill Rock Stars

Bikini Kill chronology
Reject All American (1996)	The Singles (1998)

Bikini Kill compilation album chronology
The C.D. Version of the First Two Records (1994)	The Singles (1998)

The Singles is a compilation album of three singles by punk rock band Bikini Kill. The album was released in 1998 by Kill Rock Stars. Joan Jett produces, plays guitar and sings on the first three tracks. In 2018, Bikini Kill reissued the album on CD and 12" vinyl.

== Music and lyrics ==
The album is made up of three singles released by Bikini Kill: "New Radio", produced by Joan Jett, was released in 1993; and "The Anti-Pleasure Dissertation" 7" and "I Like Fucking", released in 1995. The album "largely deals in the pursuit and politics of joy", with drummer Tobi Vail singing on two of the songs.

"Demirep" – a word defined in the 7" liner notes as a "woman of doubtful repute; an adventuress" – opens with singer Kathleen Hanna and Jett playing the hand game "Miss Mary Mack".

"I Hate Danger" – b-side to "I Like Fucking", and one of the songs sung by Vail – is a metaphor for the systemic silencing of women, and features girl-group vocals.

== Critical reception ==
Professional ratings
Review scores
Source	Rating
AllMusic	4/5 stars
Robert Christgau	A−
Pitchfork	8.7/10 (1998); 10/10 (2018)
Spin	8/10

The Singles received positive reviews, with most critics citing the brighter, poppier production as a highlight. AllMusic rated the album 4 out of 5 stars, saying "there's no noisy, murky, meandering at all, and the brighter production and melodic hooks pack a wallop." Robert Christgau also reviewed the album positively, citing Bikini Kill's intensity, and called The Singles "striking and impressive."

In 2018, Jenn Pelly, writing for Pitchfork, rated the album Best New Reissue in an extensive review with a 10 out of 10 rating. She called The Singles "the defining document of the feminist punk band whose music remains relevant, righteous, and unflappably cool.", and described Bikini Kill as "a scream in the face of silence, shattering it, casting its bondage into stark relief."

== Track listing ==
No.	Title	Writer(s)	Producer(s)	Length
1.	"New Radio"		Joan Jett	1:33
2.	"Rebel Girl"	Kathleen Hanna; Billy Karren; Tobi Vail; Kathi Wilcox	Jett	2:37
3.	"DemiRep"		Jett	2:47
4.	"In Accordance to Natural Law"			0:28
5.	"Strawberry Julius"			2:17
6.	"Anti-Pleasure Dissertation"			2:29
7.	"Rah! Rah! Replica"			0:58
8.	"I Like Fucking"			2:16
9.	"I Hate Danger"			1:58

== Personnel ==
- Kathleen Hanna - vocals (1, 2, 3, 5, 6, 7, 8), bass (4, 9)
- Kathi Wilcox - bass (1, 2, 3, 5, 6, 7, 8), drums (4, 9)
- Billy Karren - guitar
- Tobi Vail - drums (1, 2, 3, 5, 6, 7, 8), vocals (4, 9)
- Joan Jett - vocals (1, 2, 3), guitar (1, 2, 3)
