= Pussy Whipped =

Studio album by Bikini Kill
- Released: October 26, 1993
- Recorded: October 1992
- Studio: Avast! Studios
- Genres: Punk rock; riot grrrl
- Length: 24:50
- Label: Kill Rock Stars
- Producer: Stuart Hallerman

Bikini Kill chronology
Yeah Yeah Yeah Yeah (1993)	Pussy Whipped (1993)	The C.D. Version of the First Two Records (1994)

Bikini Kill studio album chronology
Yeah Yeah Yeah Yeah (1993)	Pussy Whipped (1993)	Reject All American (1996)

Pussy Whipped is the first full-length album by the American punk rock band Bikini Kill. It was released on Kill Rock Stars on October 26, 1993. It is their most commercially successful album, peaking at number 20 on the UK Independent Singles and Albums Charts.

== Critical reception ==
Professional ratings
Review scores
Source	Rating
AllMusic	4/5 stars
Entertainment Weekly	A−
Los Angeles Times	3.5/4 stars
The Rolling Stone Album Guide	4/5 stars
Spin Alternative Record Guide	7/10
Uncut	9/10
The Village Voice	A−

David Browne of Entertainment Weekly called Pussy Whipped "the first great riot-grrrl album". The Guardian wrote that "Hanna is so enraged that words to fetching tunes like 'Hamster Baby' and 'Star-Bellied Boy' are transmuted to wild shrieks."

Heather Phares of AllMusic said, "'Rebel Girl' is a manifesto just waiting to be discovered, and the rest of the album sees the band occasionally adding fun to their recipe for punk chaos." In 2015, Spin placed Pussy Whipped at number 222 on its list of the "300 Best Albums of the Past 30 Years". In 2016, Pitchfork placed it at number 10 on its list of the "50 Best Indie Rock Albums of the Pacific Northwest". Rolling Stone included "Rebel Girl" on its list of the "Most Excellent Songs of Every Year Since 1967", a playlist assembled by the magazine in 2006 to celebrate its 1,000th issue (The version of "Rebel Girl" included here differs from the Joan Jett–produced single version).

== Track listing ==
All tracks are written by Kathleen Hanna, Billy Karren, Kathi Wilcox, and Tobi Vail.

No.	Title	Length
1.	"Blood One"	1:44
2.	"Alien She"	1:41
3.	"Magnet"	1:26
4.	"Speed Heart"	1:47
5.	"Lil' Red"	2:13
6.	"Tell Me So"	2:20
7.	"Sugar"	2:22
8.	"Star Bellied Boy"	1:33
9.	"Hamster Baby"	2:20
10.	"Rebel Girl"	2:43
11.	"Star Fish"	1:03
12.	"For Tammy Rae"	3:33

== Personnel ==
Credits adapted from the liner notes.

- Kathleen Hanna – vocals (all tracks except "Speed Heart", "Tell Me So", and "Hamster Baby"), bass guitar ("Star Fish")
- Billy Karren – guitar
- Kathi Wilcox – bass guitar (all tracks except "Star Fish"), vocals ("Speed Heart")
- Tobi Vail – drums, vocals ("Tell Me So" and "Hamster Baby")
- Stuart Hallerman – production, engineering
- Tammy Rae Carland – cover photography

== Charts ==
Chart performance for Pussy Whipped
Chart (1993)	Peak position
UK Independent Albums (OCC)	20
