= Reject All American =

Studio album by Bikini Kill
- Released: April 5, 1996
- Recorded: November 1995
- Genre: Punk rock; riot grrrl
- Length: 26:44
- Label: Kill Rock Stars
- Producer: John Goodmanson

Bikini Kill chronology
The C.D. Version of the First Two Records (1994)	Reject All American (1996)	The Singles (1998)

Bikini Kill studio album chronology
Pussy Whipped (1993)	Reject All American (1996)

Reject All American is the second studio album by the American punk rock band Bikini Kill, released in 1996 by Kill Rock Stars.

== Recording and release ==
Reject All American was recorded in November 1995 and produced by John Goodmanson. The album was released on April 5, 1996, by the independent record label Kill Rock Stars.

== Critical reception ==
Professional ratings
Review scores
Source	Rating
AllMusic	3/5 stars
The Encyclopedia of Popular Music	3/5 stars
Entertainment Weekly	A−
Los Angeles Times	3.5/4 stars
Spin	7/10
The Village Voice	A−

Reject All American received generally favorable reviews from music critics. David Browne of Entertainment Weekly opined that the album is "28 wonderfully concentrated minutes of unrelenting punk, with mid-tempo stops that pay homage to Kurt Cobain and Tony Randall. The Go-Go's as riot grrrls." Robert Christgau praised Kathleen Hanna's vocals and Billy Karren's guitar playing, stating that they add definition and confidence.

In 2026 Rolling Stone placed it at 19 on their list of The 100 Greatest Punk Albums of All Time.

== Track listing ==
All tracks are written by Kathleen Hanna, Billy Karren, Tobi Vail, and Kathi Wilcox.

Reject All American track listing
No.	Title	Length
1.	"Statement of Vindication"	1:11
2.	"Capri Pants"	1:40
3.	"Jet Ski"	2:34
4.	"Distinct Complicity"	2:29
5.	"False Start"	3:12
6.	"R.I.P."	3:37
7.	"No Backrub"	1:52
8.	"Bloody Ice Cream"	1:25
9.	"For Only"	2:25
10.	"Tony Randall"	2:23
11.	"Reject All American"	2:30
12.	"Finale"	1:33

== Personnel ==
- Kathleen Hanna – vocals, bass on 4, 5 & 9
- Tobi Vail – drums, vocals on 4, 5 & 9
- Kathi Wilcox – bass, vocals on 5, drums on 4, 5 & 9
- Billy Karren – guitar, trumpet on 9
