= Juliana Luecking =

American filmmaker

Juliana Luecking is an American musician, spoken-word artist and video maker. QueenJuliana is her YouTube channel where People Are a Trip, a series filmed in public places in New York City, is featured. Luecking's videos were instrumental in Picture New York's 2007 fight to protect the rights of NYC artists to shoot video and take pictures free of police harassment.

Punk rocker Kathleen Hanna described Luecking as a mentor and instrumental to her development as a feminist. Luecking's name appears in the lyrics of the Le Tigre song "Hot Topic". Her friendship with Kathleen Hanna is an inspiration for the Bikini Kill song, “Rebel Girl”, first released on Kill Rock Stars Records in 1993. Luecking performed in Washington, DC for the March on Washington for Lesbian, Gay and Bi Equal Rights and Liberation.

Luecking was one of the founders of SWIM, a "radical discussion forum" which disrupted the College Music Journal convention to protest against a sexist display by Sony. She has records on the Kill Rock Stars label and Simple Machines Records, and is a guest artist on recordings by the bands Holy Rollers, Tribe 8, Semiautomatic, and Le Tigre. She has appeared with Pansy Division.

Luecking has spoken about valuing a direct relationship with her audience at live performances.
