= Bikini Kill (EP) =

EP by Bikini Kill
- Released: 9 October 1992
- Recorded: 1991–1992
- Studio: Inner Ear (Arlington)
- Genre: Punk rock
- Length: 15:15
- Label: Kill Rock Stars
- Producer: Ian MacKaye

Bikini Kill chronology
Revolution Girl Style Now! (1991)	Bikini Kill (1992)	Yeah Yeah Yeah Yeah (1993)

Professional ratings
Review scores
Source	Rating
Christgau's Consumer Guide	A−
Encyclopedia of Popular Music	3/5 stars
Paste	9.1/10
Pitchfork	8.7/10
Rolling Stone	(1993) (2012)
Spin Alternative Record Guide	8/10

Bikini Kill is the first EP by the American punk rock band Bikini Kill led by singer Kathleen Hanna. The six-song vinyl EP was released in 1992 on Kill Rock Stars. It was produced by Fugazi's Ian MacKaye. In 1994, the EP was released on CD together with the Yeah Yeah Yeah Yeah EP under the name The CD Version of the First Two Records.

In November 2012, Hanna founded Bikini Kill Records with the intention of reissuing Bikini Kill's discography, explaining that Bikini Kill felt their relationship with Kill Rock Stars had stagnated following several years without releasing any new material. Hanna also remarked that "There's a kind of 90's revival [of feminism]" at the time that Bikini Kill decided to reissue their older releases.

== Track listing ==
All tracks are written by Kathleen Hanna, Billy Karren, Tobi Vail and Kathi Wilcox

No.	Title	Length
1.	"Double Dare Ya"	2:40
2.	"Liar"	2:35
3.	"Carnival"	1:30
4.	"Suck My Left One"	2:24
5.	"Feels Blind"	3:21
6.	"Thurston Hearts the Who"	3:45
