= Revolution Girl Style Now =

Demo album by Bikini Kill
- Released: 1991
- Recorded: 1990–1991
- Genre: Punk rock; hardcore punk; grunge; indie rock
- Length: 21:29
- Label: Self-released

Bikini Kill chronology
Revolution Girl Style Now (1991)	Bikini Kill (1992)

Bikini Kill studio album chronology
Revolution Girl Style Now (1991)	Yeah Yeah Yeah Yeah (1993)

Professional ratings
Review scores
Source	Rating
Alternative Rock	9/10

Revolution Girl Style Now is a demo album by the punk rock band Bikini Kill. It was self-released in cassette form in 1991 and recorded at Yoyo Studios.

The 1991 cassette was released for the first time on vinyl, CD and digital formats in 2015 via the band's own label, Bikini Kill Records. The reissue includes three previously unreleased tracks: "Ocean Song", "Just Once", and "Playground". The album has most recently been reissued as a limited edition 30th anniversary pressing on red vinyl via Bikini Kill Records.

The name of the album was a slogan that Bikini Kill used along with "Stop the J-Word Jealousy from Killing Girl Love". It dates back to at least the summer of 1991 when Bikini Kill and Bratmobile, originally from Olympia, Washington, traveled to Washington DC for an extended visit. Author Dave Thompson, in his book Alternative Rock (2000), noted its rough sound, "[but that] doesn't change the fact that the only truly essential BK album is the one they created while building their own crowd themselves – not having one thrust upon them by everyone else." Daniel Sinker, founder of Punk Planet magazine has written:

"Revolution Girl Style Now!" turned into "Girl Power" the catchphrase of manufactured pop superstars the Spice Girls; the Lilith Fair became one of the largest-grossing summer music festivals of the 90s; and Titanic made half a billion dollars at the box office largely from, according to the Nation's Katha Politt, 'Women-especially teenage girls-whose repeated viewings, often in groups of friends, have made Titanic the highest grossing movie in history." Yes, it was a revolution all right: Women were finally recognized as a market force that stretched into the previously male-dominated realm of entertainment. So what happened? How did "revolution girl-style now!" get turned into a marketing scheme? Two words: the media."

== Track listing ==
No.	Title	Length
1.	"Candy"	3:28
2.	"Daddy's Li'l Girl"	2:35
3.	"Feels Blind"	3:42
4.	"Suck My Left One"	2:44
5.	"Carnival"	1:44
6.	"This Is Not a Test"	1:53
7.	"Double Dare Ya"	2:37
8.	"Liar"	2:46
Total length:		21:29

=== 2015 reissue bonus tracks ===
No.	Title	Length
9.	"Ocean Song"	3:29
10.	"Just Once"	3:35
11.	"Playground"	3:33
Total length:		31:27
