= Yeah Yeah Yeah Yeah =

Studio album by Bikini Kill
- Released: March 1993
- Recorded: October 1992
- Genre: Punk rock
- Length: 14:36
- Label: Kill Rock Stars

Bikini Kill chronology
Bikini Kill (1992)	Yeah Yeah Yeah Yeah (1993)	Pussy Whipped (1993)

Bikini Kill studio album chronology
Revolution Girl Style Now! (1991)	Yeah Yeah Yeah Yeah (1993)	Pussy Whipped (1993)

Professional ratings
Review scores
Source	Rating
AllMusic	4/5 stars
Christgau's Consumer Guide	(neither)
Pitchfork	8.6/10

Yeah Yeah Yeah Yeah is the Bikini Kill side of a split album released in 1993 on Kill Rock Stars. The other side featured Huggy Bear's Our Troubled Youth. In 1994, Bikini Kill released the compilation The C.D. Version of the First Two Records which featured Yeah Yeah Yeah Yeah along with their 1992 self-titled EP.

Yeah Yeah Yeah Yeah was released as a standalone LP by Bikini Kill Records on April 15, 2014. This release, which did not feature the Huggy Bear tracks due to rights, was expanded with unreleased tracks recorded at live shows and band practices. This expanded tracklisting was also featured on a re-release of The First Two Records in 2015.

== Track listing ==
=== Side A ===
No.	Title	Length
1.	"White Boy"	2:26
2.	"This Is Not a Test"	1:59
3.	"Don't Need You"	1:27
4.	"Jigsaw Youth"	1:55
5.	"Resist Psychic Death"	1:40
6.	"Rebel Girl"	2:47
7.	"Outta Me"	2:22
Total length:		14:36

=== Side B (expanded version only) ===
No.	Title	Length
8.	"George Bush Is a Pig"
9.	"I Busted In Your Chevy Window"
10.	"Get Out"
11.	"Why"
12.	"Fuck Twin Peaks"
13.	"Girl Soldier"
14.	"Not Right Now"
