= Bikini Kill =

American punk rock band

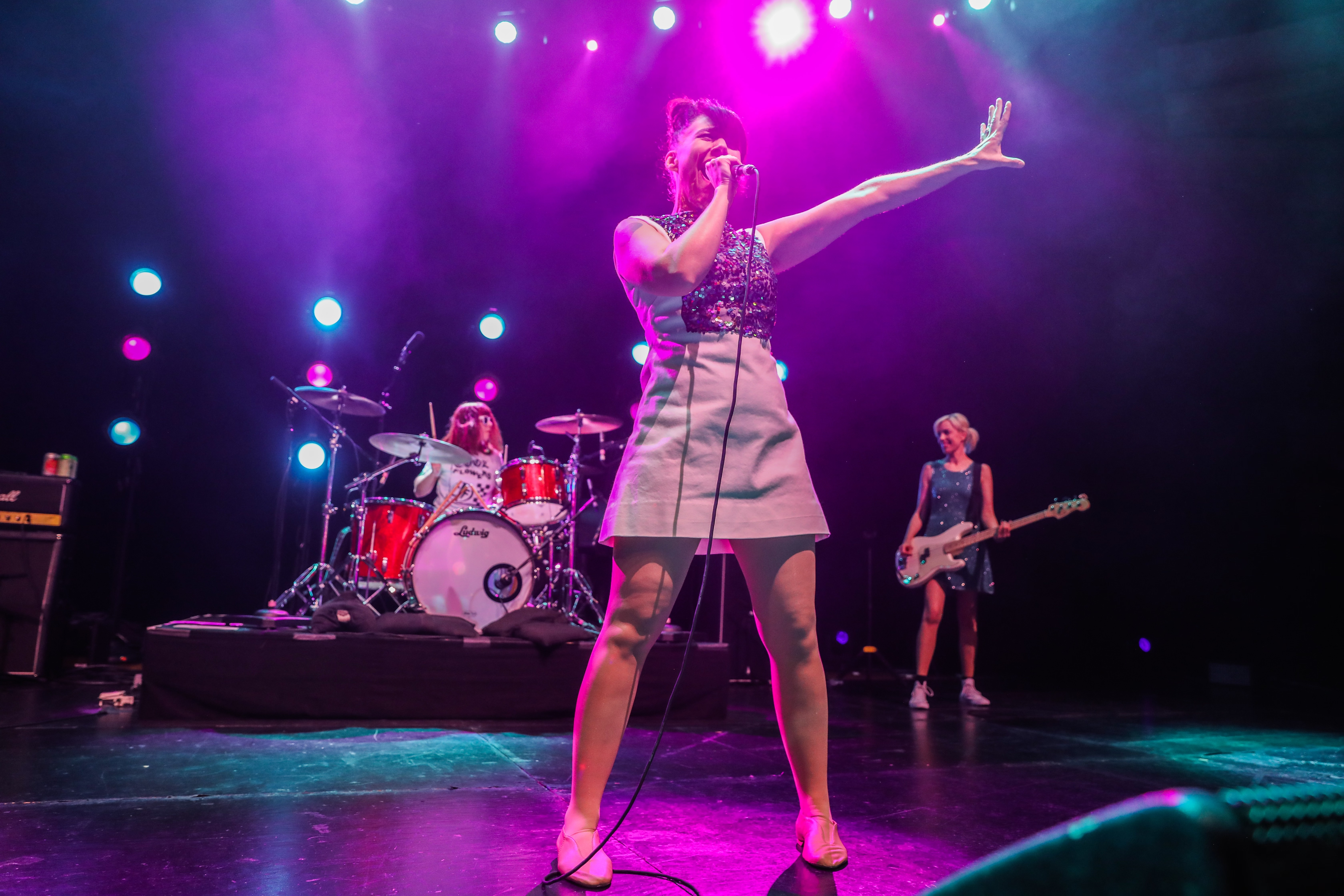
- Bikini Kill performing in 2019

Background information
- Origin: Olympia, Washington, U.S.
- Genres: Punk rock; alternative rock; riot grrrl
- Years active: 1990–1997; 2017; 2019–present
- Labels: Kill Rock Stars; Wiiija; Bikini Kill
- Spinoffs: The Julie Ruin; Julie Ruin; Le Tigre
- Members: Kathleen Hanna; Kathi Wilcox; Tobi Vail
- Past members: Billy Karren
- Website: bikinikill.com

Bikini Kill is an American punk rock band formed in Olympia, Washington, in October 1990. The group originally consisted of singer and songwriter Kathleen Hanna, guitarist Billy Karren, bassist Kathi Wilcox, and drummer Tobi Vail. The band pioneered the riot grrrl movement with feminist lyrics and fiery performances. Their music is characteristically abrasive and hardcore-influenced.

After five major releases (two full-length albums, one split album, one EP, and one demo album), they disbanded in 1997. The band reunited briefly in 2017, and then on a more permanent basis in 2019, with various musicians in place of Karren. In 2025, Jeff Mezydlo of Yardbarker included the band in his list of "20 underrated bands from the 1990s who are worth rediscovering".

== History ==
=== 1990 – 1997: Formation and career ===
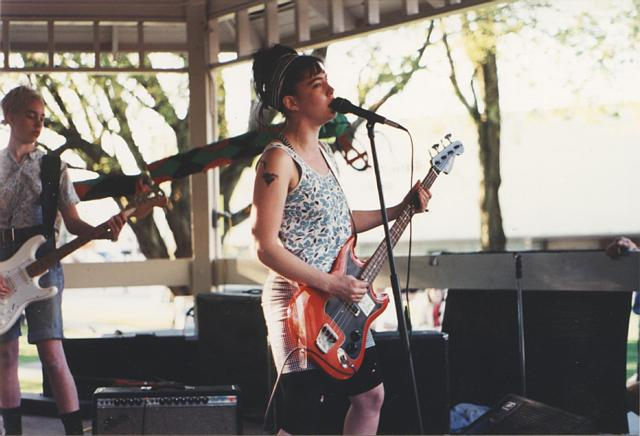
Performing in 1991

Bikini Kill was formed in Olympia, Washington, in October 1990, by Kathleen Hanna (vocals), Billy Karren (guitar), Kathi Wilcox (bass), and Tobi Vail (drums). Hanna, Vail, and Wilcox met while attending The Evergreen State College in Washington. Hanna also published a fanzine called Bikini Kill for their first tours in 1991. The band wrote songs together and encouraged a female-centric environment at their shows, urging women to come to the front of the stage and handing out lyric sheets to them. Hanna would also dive into the crowd to personally remove male hecklers. Such male concertgoers would often verbally and physically assault Hanna during shows when the tickets were still inexpensive and easily procured. However, the band's reach included large male audiences as well as young women.

Fellow riot grrrl musician Lois Maffeo originally adopted Bikini Kill as a band name, inspired by the 1967 B-movie The Million Eyes of Sumuru. She and her friend Margaret Doherty used the name for a one-off performance in the late 1980s where they donned faux fur punk cave girl costumes. Vail liked the name and appropriated it after Maffeo settled on the band name Cradle Robbers.

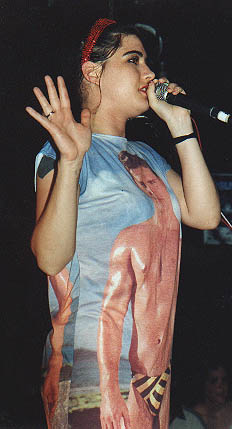
Kathleen Hanna performing with Bikini Kill in Sydney, Australia, in 1996

After an independent demo cassette, Revolution Girl Style Now, Bikini Kill released the Bikini Kill EP on the indie label Kill Rock Stars. Produced by Ian MacKaye of Minor Threat and Fugazi, the release helped establish the band's audience. Bikini Kill toured in London, England to begin working with Huggy Bear, releasing a split album, Our Troubled Youth / Yeah Yeah Yeah Yeah, and touring the UK. The tour was the subject of a documentary film by Lucy Thane titled It Changed My Life: Bikini Kill in the U.K. The band's debut album, Pussy Whipped, was released in September 1993. Upon their return to the United States, the band began working with Joan Jett of the Runaways, whose music Hanna described as an early example of the Riot Grrrl aesthetic. Jett produced the single "New Radio"/"Rebel Girl" for the band, and Hanna co-wrote several songs on Jett's Pure and Simple album.

By the following year, Riot Grrrl was receiving constant attention in the media, and Bikini Kill were increasingly referred to as pioneers of the movement. Hanna called for a "media blackout" amongst Riot Grrrls, as they felt the band and the movement were being misrepresented by the media. The pioneer reputation endures but, as Hanna recalls, "[Bikini Kill was] very vilified during the '90s by so many people, and hated by so many people, and I think that that's been kind of written out of the history. People were throwing chains at our heads – people hated us – and it was really, really hard to be in that band."

The band's final album, Reject All American, was released in 1996. After the band's breakup in 1997, a compilation of singles recorded between 1993 and 1995 was released in 1998 under the name The Singles.

=== 1998 – 2016: Post-breakup ===
During the summer of 1992, Karren, Wilcox, and Vail, along with Molly Neuman of Bratmobile, formed The Frumpies, touring as late as the early 2000s along with a similar Italian punk rock band Dada Swing.

Vail, notorious for her numerous side projects and being in several bands at a time, later resurfaced in a band called Spider and the Webs, and played with the Old Haunts until the band broke up in 2009. Kathi Wilcox played in the Casual Dots, who released albums in 2004 and 2022, and Billy Karren played in Ghost Mom. Hanna first contributed to an LP called Real Fiction as a member of the Fakes, and then turned to more dance-based new wave music (with similar feminist lyrical themes) on her solo debut, Julie Ruin. She then became a member of the political new wave outfit Le Tigre. After Le Tigre broke up, Hanna became the front woman of a band named after her solo project, The Julie Ruin, for which Wilcox plays bass.

In February 2016, a pro-Hillary Clinton clip utilizing the Bikini Kill song "Rebel Girl" began to go viral, but was taken down by Vail (who supported Bernie Sanders in the primary).

=== 2017 – present: Reunion tours ===
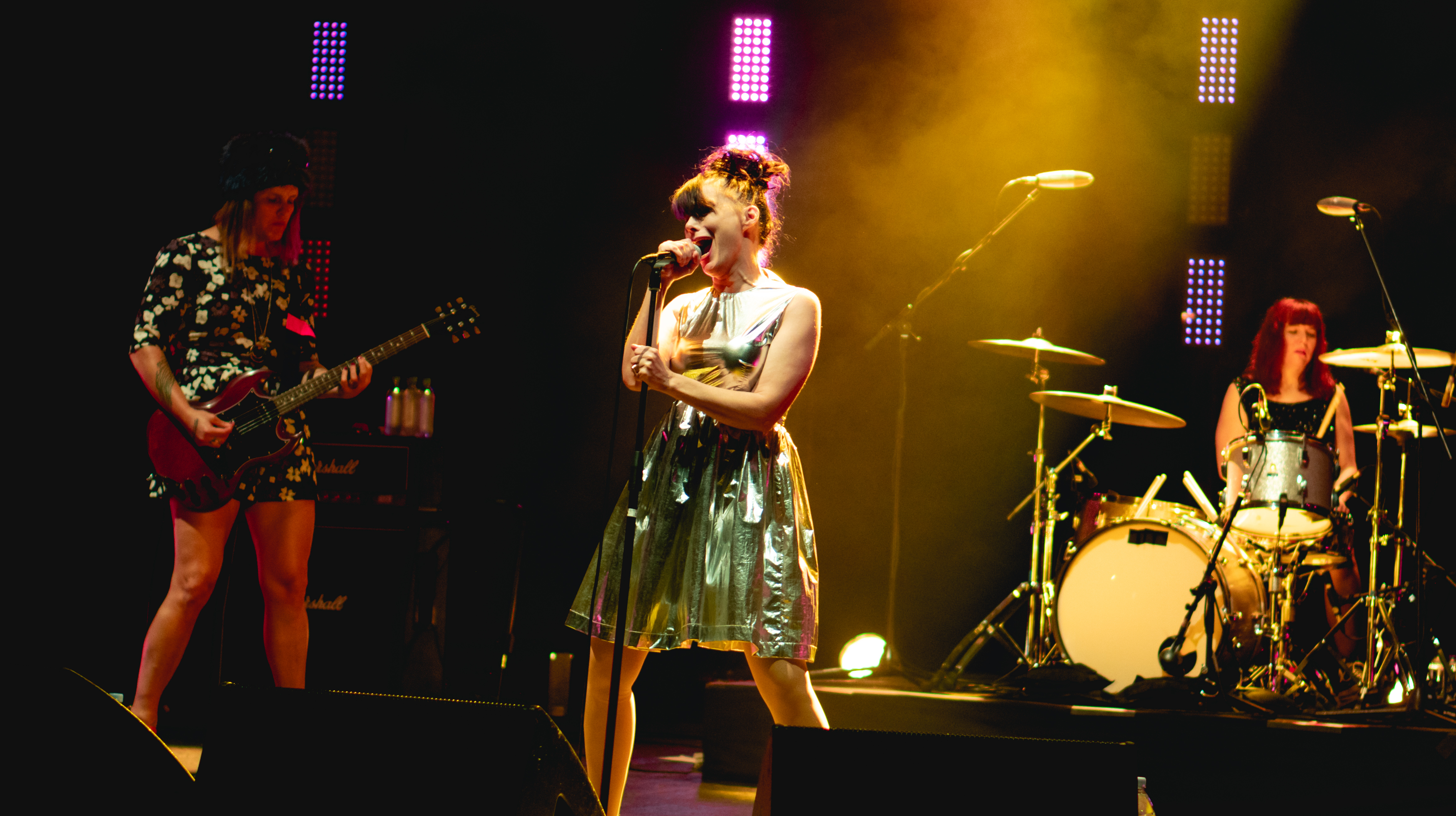
Bikini Kill in 2019, at the O2 Brixton Academy

In 2017, Kathleen Hanna, Kathi Wilcox and Tobi Vail reunited to play one song at a book-release concert for Jenn Pelly's book about the Raincoats. On January 15, 2019, Bikini Kill announced four U.S. shows, in New York and Los Angeles. The lineup for these shows included Hanna, Wilcox, Tobi Vail and touring guitarist Erica Dawn Lyle, who replaced Billy Karren in the lineup. The first show was April 25 at the Hollywood Palladium with Alice Bag as opener. In June the band played two European dates, in London at Brixton Academy, supported by Big Joanie, and with the Tuts and Child's Pose opening. On September 15, they headlined the third day of the Riot Fest event in Chicago.

On November 6, 2019, Bikini Kill announced a thirteen-date North American Tour for 2020, beginning in Olympia, Washington. The lineup for these shows was the same for the previous dates in 2019, and was scheduled to start March 13, 2020 at Olympia's Capitol Theater. The remainder of the West Coast tour included shows in Victoria, B.C., where they were to be supported by Mecca Normal, and in Portland supported by the Lithics. The tour also included some European dates in June and August, including Oslo's Øya Festival. The tour was rescheduled to 2022 in the wake of the COVID-19 pandemic.

In October 2022 the band announced an Australian tour for March 2023, their first Australian shows in 26 years, touring to Hobart, Brisbane, Adelaide, Melbourne, the Golden Plains Festival in country Victoria, Perth and at the Sydney Opera House. Hanna, Wilcox and Vail were joined by touring guitarist Sara Landeau, who played with both Hanna and Wilcox in The Julie Ruin. Vail also fell ill for part of the tour, leaving the band's Australian drum tech Lauren Hammel (also of Tropical Fuck Storm) to fill in on drums for the Victorian shows.

Early in 2020, in an interview with Pitchfork, Hanna stated that the band had no plans at the time to create new material.

== Members ==
Current members

- Kathleen Hanna – lead vocals (1990–1997, 2017, 2019–present), bass (1990–1991, 2017, occasionally: 1991–1997, 2019–present)
- Tobi Vail – drums, occasional lead vocals (1990–1997, 2017, 2019–present)
- Kathi Wilcox – bass, occasional drums (1991–1997, 2017, 2019–present), backing vocals (1990–1997, 2017, 2019–present), guitar (1990–1991, 2017, occasionally: 1991–1997, 2019–present)

Current touring musicians

- Sara Landeau – guitar, occasional bass (2022–present)

Former members

- Billy Karren – guitar, occasional bass (1991–1997)

Former touring musicians

- Erica Dawn Lyle – guitar, occasional bass (2017, 2019, 2022)
- Lauren Hammel – drums (2023)

== Discography ==
- Revolution Girl Style Now (1991)
- Bikini Kill (1992)
- Yeah Yeah Yeah Yeah (1993)
- Pussy Whipped (1993)
- Reject All American (1996)

== See also ==
- DIY ethic
- Ladyfest
