= Look Around (Beat Happening album) =

Compilation album by Beat Happening
- Released: 20 November 2015
- Genre: Twee pop
- Length: 77:03
- Label: Domino

Look Around is a compilation album by indie rock band Beat Happening, released on 20 November 2015. The album is touted as a "career-spanning double album anthology", with track selections picked by the band.

== Background ==
The album was released as a double LP, CD, cassette, and a deluxe LP version with a bonus 7" of "Indian Summer" and "Foggy Eyes" on yellow vinyl.

== Reception ==
Professional ratings
Review scores
Source	Rating
AllMusic	5/5 stars
Pitchfork	8.2/10

In a review for AllMusic, Tim Sendra wrote, "between Johnson's deadpan vocal delivery, his lovingly crafted persona, and his creepy and humorous lyrics, Lewis' less theatrical, open-hearted singing and writing, and Lunsford's steady musicianship, the band formed the kind of complementary bond most bands would kill to have. Their pieces fit together perfectly and their songs are short bursts of pop music that at their best come as close to perfection as anybody's ever have". Pitchfork's Brandon Stosuy called the curation "perfect" and "a great primer" with "no major oversights or head-scratching inclusions".

== Track listing ==
Adapted from CD release.

All tracks are written by Beat Happening.

No.	Title	Original album	Length
1.	"Our Secret"	Beat Happening	2:47
2.	"Foggy Eyes"	Beat Happening	2:40
3.	"Bad Seeds"	Beat Happening	1:49
4.	"What's Important"	Beat Happening	2:00
5.	"Look Around"	Beat Happening	2:53
6.	"Bewitched"	Jamboree	3:05
7.	"In Between"	Jamboree	2:20
8.	"Indian Summer"	Jamboree	3:02
9.	"Other Side"	Black Candy	3:34
10.	"Black Candy"	Black Candy	2:56
11.	"Cast a Shadow"	Black Candy	2:28
12.	"Nancy Sin"	Dreamy	2:32
13.	"Knock on Any Door"	Dreamy	3:28
14.	"Left Behind"	Dreamy	2:51
15.	"Red Head Walking"	Dreamy	2:07
16.	"Fortune Cookie Prize"	Dreamy	3:45
17.	"Hot Chocolate Boy"	Dreamy	2:19
18.	"Pinebox Derby"	You Turn Me On	3:05
19.	"Tiger Trap"	You Turn Me On	6:51
20.	"Godsend"	You Turn Me On	9:25
21.	"Teenage Caveman"	You Turn Me On	4:34
22.	"Noise"	You Turn Me On	3:21
23.	"Angel Gone"	Non-album single	3:11
Total length:			1:17:03

== Personnel ==
Adapted from LP liner notes:

- Bret Lunsford – performer
- Calvin Johnson – performer
- Heather Lewis – performer
