= Beat Happening (album) =

Studio album by Beat Happening
- Released: November 1985
- Recorded: 1983–1985
- Venues: 13th Precinct, Portland, Oregon
- Studios: Yoyo; Martin Apartments; The Firehouse; Recital hall, Olympia, Washington
- Genres: Indie pop; jangle pop
- Length: 19:01 (original LP); 51:13 (1990 reissue)
- Label: K
- Producer: Greg Sage

Beat Happening chronology
Three Tea Breakfast (1984)	Beat Happening (1985)	Jamboree (1988)

Beat Happening is the debut studio album by the American rock band Beat Happening, released in November 1985 through K Records. After the end of their previous band, guitarist Calvin Johnson and drummer Heather Lewis formed Beat Happening, and guitarist Bret Lunsford joined them soon after. Between November 1983 and February 1985, the band recorded several tracks that appeared on different versions of their debut album. Greg Sage of the Wipers produced two of the recording sessions, which occurred at the studios The Firehouse and Yoyo, both of which are in Olympia, Washington. Other tracks were recorded at Johnson's residence at the Martin Apartments and with friend Pat Maley in a recital hall at Evergreen State College.

The album has been described as indie pop and jangle pop, and was compared to the work of the Cramps with its simplistic guitar work. The artwork for Beat Happening has a basic design and was used on gig flyers Johnson printed. Photographs of the band for the album sleeve were taken at Capitol Lake, Olympia. In 1984 and 1985, before the album's release, the band issued two cassettes of songs from the album's sessions. Johnson personally sold copies of the vinyl LP to record stores while traveling across the United States. With the help of journalist Jerry Thackray, Rough Trade Records issued Beat Happening in late 1986.

Beat Happening was met with positive reviews; contemporaneous critics praised the songwriting and retrospective reviews focused on the album's production. Melody Maker included Beat Happening in its list of the best 30 releases from the year. Tracks from all of the album's recording sessions are included on the compilation album 1983–85. Beat Happening has been issued several times, alone and as part of box sets. Musicians including Ian MacKaye and Phil Elverum of Mount Eerie have expressed admiration for the album; and artists including Ben Gibbard, Scrawl, and Seaweed have covered tracks from it.

== Background ==
In early 1983, vocalist and guitarist Calvin Johnson, and drummer Heather Lewis performed with guitarist Laura Carter as Laura, Heather and Calvin. Johnson and Lewis had met the year before at a college party where Lewis's band The Supreme Cool Beings were playing. (Note: When working at KAOS, Johnson formed K Records in mid-1982 with the intent of promoting mainly bands local to the US Northwest with listeners around the world. K's first release was the cassette EP Survival of the Coolest, a recording of a live set by The Supreme Cool Beings that had been performed at Johnson's show at KAOS.) After seeing them perform, guitarist Bret Lunsford booked Laura, Heather and Calvin for a show in Anacortes, Washington. By the time of the gig, Carter had moved to Olympia, Washington, and Laura, Heather and Calvin had stopped playing together. Consequently, Lunsford was brought in to play alongside Johnson and Lewis. It was the first occasion all members of Beat Happening were onstage together. (Note: Lunsford said they played two improvised songs. Johnson was unhappy at the ramshackle nature of the gig. He and Johnson grew closer when they saw a local punk act, an experience that influenced Johnson's thoughts about the importance of community centers on art and music.)

Johnson invited Lunsford to join the band, saying "We should call it Beat Happening and we should go to Japan". He explained that Japan was "the last place on earth where it's still cool to be American", and that this would make it easy to "become teen idols overnight". Lunsford said he would only join if they made the trip to Japan. (Note: Weeks before this, Lunsford was in Alaska for several months, an excursion that allowed him to better understand the world.) In September 1983, Lewis relocated to Seattle, Washington, and Lunsford moved to Olympia. Beat Happening had minor local success when one of their tracks appeared on a Sub Pop cassette compilation, and when they opened for the Wipers. Around this time, Wipers' frontman Greg Sage visited Johnson at his home in the Ray Apartments in Olympia; Sage showed Johnson newly-written Wipers songs and said he was constructing his own recording facility in Portland, Oregon, and was scouting for acts to record there. Beat Happening was still newly formed so Johnson did not accept Sage's proposal to record the band.

== Sessions ==
The ten tracks on the original release of Beat Happening came from a combination of several recording sessions, a live show, and a home boombox recording.

=== 1983 recordings ===
In November 1983 at the Ray Apartments, Beat Happening recorded their song "Fourteen", their first recording. The following month, the band decided they had enough rehearsed material to record and contacted Sage about his recording offer. Sage was still building his studio but said he would visit Olympia to record them there. At Olympia's Evergreen State College, students were permitted to use a former firehouse for band rehearsals to prevent noise in dorms. Beat Happening's first sessions with Sage occurred in the firehouse. They were assisted by Bradley Sweek, frontman of the Young Pioneers, who also used the rehearsal space, and had become friends with Johnson and Sage.

Sage had a reputation for helping to record acts without wanting any money in return. He was supportive of Beat Happening's experimentation, having worked similarly with the Wipers' on Youth of America (1981). On December 11, 1983, Beat Happening recorded "Down at the Sea", "I Love You", "Our Secret" and "What's Important". They followed this with a live performance of "Run Down the Stairs" for campus radio station KAOS.

Shure SM57 microphones were used to record the guitar and drums as they were played live. Sage used a Neumann tube microphone to record the vocals on reel-to-reel tape using a four-track machine borrowed from another college student. While the band was sometimes unable to play a song all the way through, multi-tracking helped them overcome their lack of technique. While recording "Our Secret", Johnson watched Lewis and Lunsford record their parts, and gestured to them to stop when he felt there was enough to sing over. When Johnson tried to record his vocals, the tape ran out partway through, ending the session and leaving out two verses from the final recording.

=== 1984 and 1985 recordings ===
In January 1984, Sweek organized an event called "Olympia Goes to Portland" at Portland venue 13th Precinct. The lineup featured Young Pioneers, Beat Happening and Rich Jensen. Jensen, who was known as a documentarian of the local community, used a Panasonic recorder to record Beat Happening playing "Bad Seeds". (Note: On the back sleeve of Beat Happening, there is a note that Parker said explains the value "placed on archiving cultural artifacts"; the note said the live recording was "preserved for posterity" by Jensen.) When they were in Japan, Beat Happening recorded the tracks "Don't Mix the Colors", "The Fall", "Honey Pot", "In My Memory" and "Youth" using superior boombox models that were unavailable in the US.

In November 1984, Evergreen alumnus Pat Maley re-recorded Beat Happening performing "Fourteen". (Note: In the following years, Maley got more involved with K Records, producing acts such as Mecca Normal and Some Velvet Sidewalk at Yoyo.) He borrowed equipment for the session using a media loan, and moved the gear from the college's library to a recital hall on campus. Maley used a reel-to-reel tape recorder and dubbed the track on to a cassette. He lost the master reel before he was able to edit the recording, meaning the version on the finished album has been equalized for balance but has not been fully mixed.

The same month, another five tracks were recorded in sessions at Maley's Yoyo Studio, which was located in a chicken-coop-turned-communal housing building in Olympia. These tracks comprised the first side of the original LP release of Beat Happening LP; the fact the tracks were recording together means they have a consistent production tone. Maley invited Beat Happening to record at his studio after being impressed with Johnson's music knowledge at an audio class Maley started teaching at Yoyo. Maley preferred psychedelic music but enjoyed "strange music" enough to want to work with Beat Happening.

Maley was displeased when the band arrived with Sage, having been under the impression he would be in charge of producing and engineering the session at his studio. The session used a TASCAM 38 eight-track recorder running half-inch tape and a TASCAM mixing board with eight output slots and twelve inputs. Digital reverb which is heard most prominently on the finger snapping on "Bad Seeds", was used. Lewis performed vocals on "Foggy Eyes", "I Let Him Get to Me" and "Run Down the Stairs"; and Johnson sang vocals on "Bad Seeds" and "I Spy". On February 13, 1985, the record's final track "In Love with You Thing" was recorded in Johnson's room at the Martin Apartments complex in Olympia using a portable cassette recorder.

== Composition and lyrics ==
AllMusic reviewer Nitsuh Abebe described the sound of Beat Happening as "indie pop in its purest form: fuzzy bedroom recordings of simplistic, cutesy songs, with intentionally innocent and juvenile lyrics, which Calvin Johnson belts out with one of the most endearingly bad voices in music history". Pitchfork contributor Quinn Moreland commented the album's material switches between "barely-there lo-fi ballads and ’60s jangle-pop ditties".

In Bryan Parker's book 33 1/3 about the album, he compared it to the works of the Cramps, a band Johnson cited as an influence. Parker said while the Cramps "embrace a more overt darkness and sexuality in their sinister psychobilly songs, Beat Happening frequently traffics in double-entendres, and both bands thrive on simple, distorted guitar lines", He also said the sequencing of side one "embodies an Olympian egalitarianism"; Johnson and Lewis alternate as lead vocalist on the tracks.

Lewis said of Johnson's lyrics: "Things are articulated in these unusual and creative ways. They're layered, and it can be interpreted in different ways. My songs are much more like the open wound. He's more guarded. I'm more spilling out." According to her, on her tracks, "My emotions are right there on my sleeve".

=== Songs on the original LP ===
The album's opening track "Foggy Eyes" opens with Johnson counting for the guitar and drums to come in. Parker thought it was the first track because it "unsurprisingly ... showcases the band at its most mature to date". According to Parker, after 20 seconds, Beat Happening distinctly "delineate their practice of challenging conventions and reevaluating the world" in the lyrics, and continue this sentiment in "Bad Seeds". Parker said of the tracks from the second session with Sage, "Bad Seeds" has the "fullest instrumentation", and noted it is the sole track on the album to include cymbals. Bongos, performed by Maley, can be heard on the song but are drowned out by the cymbal and tom hits. On "I Spy", Johnson's voice evokes those of musicians Lee Hazlewood and Scott Walker. Parker said between the music and the lyrics, the song comes across as a child's version of a theme song to a lesser-quality spy film. He said with the last line in the track, the average "listener might miss the indictment of conventional masculinity, those in-tune heard it loud and clear". Similarly, Michael Azerrad described it as seeming like a "corny espionage spoof" until its last line "hurl[s] a parting barb at machismo". Journalist and musician Alan Larsen of K Records act Some Velvet Sidewalk said the song's narrator laments typical masculine roles into which young males fit. Larsen said the lyrics spoke to him about being older and manhood, saying: "That was what culture was doing to you as a male. That was your archetype. I thought of that work as something that could talk to me about gender."

"I Spy" is bookended by "I Let Him Get to Me" and "Run Down the Stairs", tracks Parker felt highlighted the jangly guitar parts and consistent snare hits, with Lewis talking about relationships. In Parker's discussion of "In Love with You Thing", he said Johnson was drawing out the syllables of the lyrics, as if he was trying to think of the next lyric as it was happening. Parker then notes when each instrument is heard for the first time in the song, saying the drum sound heard "might not even be a drum. ... Then, suddenly, there is a beat happening. The band's name asserts the present and the ongoing." The lyrics deal with unrequited love, and the track almost a cappella during its verses; Parker highlighted one couplet of lyrics, "If I could touch those parted lips / Your swinging little hips just gotta be kissed", saying these lines exemplify the "suggestive sexuality Beat Happening would continue to use as a counterweight for their sugary sweet juvenilia" in later works. (Note: Sex is a main topic in later Beat Happening songs; Parker said their third and fourth studio albums Black Candy (1989) and Dreamy (1991) are plentiful with allusions to sexual imagery in nearly all of the tracks.)

In "Down at the Sea", described by Azerrad as a "Buddy Hollyesque romp", Lewis reminisces about a party on a beach. Parker commented on the varying sound quality on "Fourteen", saying the drums are placed low in the mix and the guitars sound thin, and called the track the "soundtrack of audacious experimentation", showcasing students trying to arrange a song. Maley said the tambura heard in the track was used to help keep time: "The thing that keeps time is the phase-shift sound in the tambura—that sort of wave had a certain timeframe that's very accurate". Because of his enthusiasm for psychedelic music, Maley proposed using the instrument. Parker said the instrument is an "odd choice, but indicates the band's willingness to let music unfold organically. Pat's interest in the tambura also informs an important bit inconspicuous divide between Olympia's youth in the early 80s." In the lyrics, Johnson has difficulty talking to his lover while the pair feed a pet rabbit, described by Azerrad as a juxtaposition of "childhood imagery with some seriously grown-up romantic alienation". According to Parker, the closing song, a live version of "Bad Seeds", "ambles through some rough spots, and the guitar's tuning is noticeably flat. Still, the live version is sneering and chaotic, full of punk rock ambition". Azerrad says its line "This time, let's do it right" is a pointed allusion to sixties counterculture.

=== Songs on other versions ===
Parker said "Our Secret" is a simplistic track that exemplifies Beat Happening's best aspects: "a tom-centered beat, a repetitive yet catchy guitar line, and Calvin's baritone vocals". According to Moreland, the song's lyrics describe "forbidden lovers [who] express their undying devotion over cups of tea". Parts of it allude to locations in Olympia, such as Smithfield Café and Capitol Lake. According to Parker, on the next few tracks, Japan becomes a character in audio samples and lyrics. "In My Memory" begins with a sample of a street vendor from Nakemeguro talking in Japanese until a guitar and hand-claps come in. In "The Fall" Johnson names individuals in his near surroundings, all of whom laugh in response, as shown in the lyrics: "Bye bye, Mari and Momoe / Bye bye, Takaaki and / Bye bye, Ai in America and / Bye bye Heather." Parker wrote the band use both the country and the room they were in to make an "artifact from the Japan trip that captures genuine fun with friends".

The lyrics of "Youth" also refer to the band's time in Japan and their mindset while organizing the trip. "Don't Mix the Colors" concludes with a clip of the subway system in Tokyo and a voice in Japanese. According to Parker, "Christmas" is the "most overt confrontation of sex" in Beat Happening's catalog. A clicking sound can be heard throughout the track as Johnson gives a bleak description of the act. Parker said the track's appeal is due to the contrast between "Christmas joy and the depression of dysfunctional sex". In "Look Around", Moreland said Johnson looks at a woman "before deciding to 'come between her thighs'".

== Cover artwork ==
The artwork for Beat Happening is a basic illustration of a kitten riding in a rocket ship on a yellow background. Parker wrote this "subtly embodied the band's influential sensibilities. Childishly adorable, the drawing induces an unavoidable smile from anyone who might find it in a record shelf." Parker also said the artwork is "so rudimentary, it almost begs to be added onto—maybe a few stars or a planet in the distance. Very likely, the band wouldn't mind at all." Moreland said the depiction implies the songs on the album are similarly childish. Several flyers for the band's gigs included the cat illustration, which Johnson had drawn; In one version, the cat is flying on a broom, and another version depicts a cat's face on a container. The final artwork for the album was initially printed on a gig flyer for the Tropicana Club; the bright, yellow background was one of the choices available at the print shop Johnson used. According to Parker, this "bright, primary color fit[s] Beat Happening's aesthetic perfectly", and that the ultimate choice is "also ingenious, since the vibrant color worked to attract attention". Azerrad described the shade as being K's "trademark" yellow, with the kitten representing punk ideals of inclusion.

The album's back cover includes a black-and-white photograph of the band members and their first names below. Lunsford said this linked with Johnson's "minimalist vision" for the band's presentation. The photograph was taken at Budd Inlet, an area of Puget Sound located north of the 4th Avenue bridge, which spans the downtown area of Olympia to its west side. The back over also includes photographs taken on a beach under a boardwalk around Capitol Lake, one of Johnson and Lewis on a sidewalk, one of Lewis on a beach, and one of Lunsford outside the Capitol Theater in Olympia. Parker said the members "peer out at the listener from the album cover and present themselves without affectation". The Rough Trade edition has an insert with two additional images of the band members, which were taken by the band's friend Julie Fay. They document one of the band's earliest shows at Smithfield Café; Jensen is depicted holding a microphone for Lewis, who is next to him on guitar, followed by Johnson on guitar and Lunsford behind the drums. Parker said the innocence of the artwork displays Beat Happening's "music and characterizes its creator, the community in which they live, and the principles by which they act".

== Release ==
There are three significantly different versions of Beat Happening: the original ten-song version on K Records, the Rough Trade version a year later, and a 1996 expanded reissue.

=== Pre-release and initial promotion ===
The four songs the band recorded with Sage during the December 1983 session and the live version of "Run Down the Stairs" were released on Beat Happening's 1984 debut, eponymous, cassette Extended Play (EP), which was limited to 100 copies. The same year, "Our Secret" and "What's Important" were released as the band's debut single. Beat Happening traveled to Japan, despite having no shows scheduled there. Johnson booked the trip through the Independent Living Contract at Evergreen as a school credit, planning to spend his time there writing for a zine. The band explored Tokyo with the hopes of booking a show; they played at Yoyogi Park, a public space where rock bands played on Sundays. They also performed and after-hours show at a high school in the area. The band were then able to secure shows at local clubs, though were forced to sell the tickets themselves. When they returned to the US, the tracks that were recorded in Japan using boomboxes were released as the cassette EP Three Tea Breakfast.

Between the opening and closure of the Tropicana club from February 1984 to January 1985, Beat Happening played there between six and ten times. Parker said the venue provided a space for the band's early repertoire and built up publicity before their debut album was released. Beat Happening was released in November 1985 through K Records; it was originally planned as a cassette but was released as an LP record. (Note: Though Beat Happening was K Records' first LP release, the catalog number KLP-001 was not assigned to the album until years afterwards. According to Parker, Johnson "sort of counted back in his head, picked a number that sounded about right, and began applying numbers" to the label's back catalog.) K-Disc mastered the album and cut the lacquers needed to press it, which was done by Bill Smith Custom Records, and Stoughton Printing made the cardboard jackets. Johnson sequenced the album's track listing; Maley said he was enthusiastic when he learned each side lasted under ten minutes. Because K-Disc's services charged more for albums with long runtimes, Johnson saved money. Publicity surrounding the album meant the band were able to sell around 300 records of the initial 700-print run to members of the local community, such as family and friends.

Johnson's brother Streator said he had sold several copies after demanding his friends buy them. Despite lacking national distribution, the band exhausted the local area, leaving Johnson with over half of the remaining stock. In December 1985, Johnson took them with him on a trip to visit his mother in Maryland. Johnson, who was accompanied by Streator and Fay, visited record shops en route and offered them copies of the album. Johnson said some stores purchased the album, though not all of them did, despite many being receptive to his proposal. He said some stores wanted to listen to the album first because few were aware of the band through their single. Parker wrote some shops tried persuading Johnson to offer the album on consignment, "meaning that if he wanted to get paid, he'd have to keep tabs on the store and come back for reimbursement if the albums sold. 'No way,' Calvin would say in these instances." According to Parker, Johnson then informed the stores he was in the area for a single day and to "take or leave it". The majority of these instances happened in January 1986 when they were returning to Olympia. Streator remained on the East Coast, leaving Fay and Johnson by themselves. Fay said in addition to record shops, they tried radio stations, venues, and press outlets such as magazines and fanzine operators.

=== Rough Trade and later editions ===
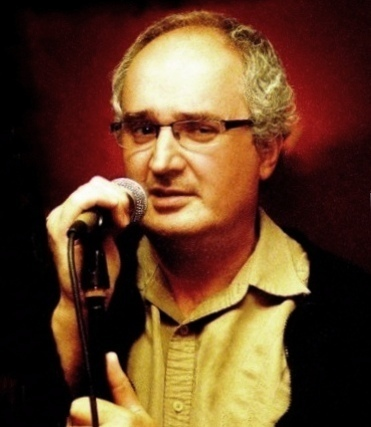
Journalist Jerry Thackray played a part in widening the fan base of Beat Happening.

Johnson described early 1986 as "an emotional time" for him. He said "I had put out this record [and it] was kind of not doing anything. Nobody had bought the record. I was trying to do K and nobody seemed to really care about it".

During this period, Johnson became associates with David Nichols, who had written to him after learning about K Records. Johnson had also written to Nichols around the same time after reading about him. Nichols took copies of Beat Happening to the UK after visiting Johnson and showed them to Jerry Thackray, a journalist for British music publications Melody Maker and NME of whom Nichols was aware through his zine The Legend!. (Note: Parker said Nichols and Thackray both had intrinsic roles in helping to expand the fan base of Beat Happening, as well as making contacts from the US Northwest and the UK, where later works from the band were issued. Alongside this, K Records issued albums from British and Scottish bands such as Heavenly, The Pastels and Talulah Gosh.) Thackray played Beat Happening to staff at Rough Trade Records, who reacted to it positively. Label founder Geoff Travis contacted Johnson, who knew of Travis from producing The Raincoats, saying he was interested in releasing the album through Rough Trade. Johnson then sent Travis the "Our Secret" single, and at Travis's suggestion, both of the single's tracks were added to the Rough Trade version. The inclusion of previously issued singles on the following album was common practice but the original K Records version of Beat Happening did not do this. Leading up to the release of the Rough Trade version in Europe, Thackray began writing in the press about his admiration for the album. Thackray gave a considerable amount of space to Beat Happening in The Legend! and wrote about them for a June 1986 issue of NME.

According to Azerrad, Rough Trade never gave Beat Happening the "first class" treatment given to some of the label's bigger bands like The Smiths. Nonetheless, the release boosted the band's spirits and exposed them to like-minded British groups like the Vaselines, Teenage Fanclub and the Pastels.

Later the same year, when Beat Happening needed transport for a tour because none of them owned a car, they hired drive-away cars. Lunsford said:

You go to a drive-away place. You have to have everyone who is a driver be 21 and over. You're delivering a car from one location to another, and you have so many days to do that. So, if you do a lot of driving frontloaded, you have time to stay the night and play a show. Because they can only require you to drive 8 hours a day."

When Lewis temporarily relocated to Los Angeles, California, Beat Happening needed a touring drummer and engaged Lunsford's girlfriend Crowe, who did not know how to play drums until shortly before, when she and Lunsford practiced until she could for the brief cross-country tour. The Rough Trade edition of Beat Happening was released in November 1986; "Our Secret" and "What's Important" were placed between "Down at the Sea" and "Fourteen". (Note: Beat Happening later worked with the British label 53rd and 3rd, which was operated by members of Shop Assistants. 53rd and 3rd issued a flexi disc consisting of "Honey Pot" and "Don't Mix the Colours", and the EP Crashing Through, both in 1988. At this time, music from Beat Happening and K Records was beginning to be released in Australia and Switzerland.) Positive press from British publications gave the band more publicity and allowed Johnson to make connections in a different part of the world. Journalist Bruce Pavitt wrote about the self-titled album in his column Sub/Pop for the music magazine The Rocket. In the December edition of his column, Pavitt wrote enthusiastically about both Johnson's work mindset and multiple K Records releases. (Note: Pavitt continued to give Beat Happening press coverage through to 1988, dedicating columns in March, April and July of that year to them. When Sub/Pop morphed from a written piece into a record label, it issued later Beat Happening albums such as Dreamy and 1992's You Turn Me On.)

In 1990, K Records and Feel Good All Over jointly released a compilation album titled 1983–85, which includes 27 tracks from all of the album's recording sessions. K Records used an abridged, 23-song track listing of this edition for its 1996 vinyl re-press of Beat Happening. This version was released on compact disc (CD) as part of the box set Crashing Through (2002), and it was released on vinyl as part of the Domino Recording Company's box set We Are Beat Happening (2019). "Our Secret", "Foggy Eyes", "Bad Seeds", "What's Important" and "Look Around" were included on the compilation Look Around (2015), which Domino also issued. Live versions of "I Love You", "Foggy Eyes", "What's Important", "I Spy" and "Bad Seeds" recorded in Japan in May 1984 were issued as the EP Live in Japan (1998).

== Reception ==
Professional ratings
Review scores
Source	Rating
AllMusic	4/5 stars
Alternative Rock	6/10
Pitchfork	9.0/10

Contemporaneous reviews of Beat Happening praised the songwriting. Pavitt wrote about the album in his February 1986 column for The Rocket, saying the release has "more character, more genuine personality, than anything I've heard all month". He added Johnson "swings his hips with an awkward deep baritone" before switching with Lewis for her songs, and summarized the band as a "positive force; sincere and willing to take risks, they show that it's just as radical to openly like someone as it is brutalize and degrade them through cheap sensationalism. Great record!" Journalist Simon Reynolds, writing in the November 15, 1986, issue of Melody Maker, discussed aspects of the album's importance, saying: "There's a delicate poise between pastiche and underlying seriousness here, that's delicious, almost camp". Reynolds also praised Beat Happening for having removed the "misogynist insolence" from their music and "reanimated [the songs] with a proto-feminist tenderness".

Retrospective reviews focused on the album's production. Author Dave Thompson, in his book Alternative Rock (2000), wrote the band's mission was to create "records which retained the freshness of the ideas that spawned the songs in the first place. This lack of complication and contrivance would remain Beat Happening's touchstone for the remainder of their career." Moreland called the album "a declaration of their undefined, instinctive, and fearless nature", while Ira Robbins of Trouser Press said it is a "fresh breeze of one-take pop ingenuity" complete with tracks that are "remorselessly amateurish but loaded with charm and invention". Abebe said while the band's subsequent releases show a marked improvement in song and production quality, their self-titled album is "as twee and charming as this type of music can get". Parker said the Sage-produced tracks on side one "sound tighter and cleaner" than the other songs he worked on.

Melody Maker ranked Beat happening at number 27 on its list of the year's 30 best albums, calling it "an unexpected masterpiece". Spin included Beat Happening on its list of 80 important albums from the 1980s. Thompson noted the 1983–85 version is "draining, but complete". Reviewing the same version, Jason Ankeny of AllMusic said the album's audio quality is "often poor, but the kinetic energy of the early sessions is palpable, and the wide-eyed charm of gems ... is undeniable". Musicians Ian MacKaye and Phil Elverum of Mount Eerie have expressed admiration for the album; MacKaye said it "seemed so rudimentary. But also it has traction. Once you hear it, you know what it is." Covers of "Our Secret", "Bad Seeds", "Foggy Eyes" and "Youth" by Leaky Chipmunk, Scrawl, Seaweed and Fish & Roses, respectively, are included on the tribute album Fortune Cookie Prize: A Tribute to Beat Happening (1992). Additional covers have been released; "Our Secret" by The Postal Service, "Bad Seeds" by Barcelona Pavilion, and others by Ben Gibbard and Teenage Fanclub.

== Track listing ==
All songs written by Calvin Johnson, Bret Lunsford and Heather Lewis.

=== Original LP – 1985 ===
Side one
No.	Title	Recording location	Length
1.	"Foggy Eyes"	Yoyo, Olympia	2:46
2.	"Bad Seeds"	Yoyo, Olympia	1:50
3.	"I Let Him Get to Me"	Yoyo, Olympia	1:32
4.	"I Spy"	Yoyo, Olympia	1:50
5.	"Run Down the Stairs"	Yoyo, Olympia	1:55

Side two
No.	Title	Recording location	Length
1.	"In Love with You Thing"	Martin Apartments, Olympia	1:11
2.	"I Love You"	The Firehouse, Olympia	2:45
3.	"Down at the Sea"	The Firehouse, Olympia	1:26
4.	"Fourteen"	Recital hall, Olympia	1:44
5.	"Bad Seeds (live)"	13th Precinct, Portland	2:02
Total length:			19:01

=== 1983–85 – 1990 ===
1983–85 track listing
No.	Title	Recording location	Length
1.	"Our Secret"	The Firehouse, Olympia	2:51
2.	"What's Important"	The Firehouse, Olympia	2:02
3.	"Down at the Sea"	The Firehouse, Olympia	1:26
4.	"I Love You"	The Firehouse, Olympia	2:04
5.	"Fourteen"	Ray Apartments, Olympia	1:50
6.	"Run Down the Stairs"	KAOS, Olympia	2:12
7.	"Primitives"	Ray Apartments, Olympia	1:33
8.	"I Spy"	Ray Apartments, Olympia	2:00
9.	"Bad Seeds (live)"	13th Precinct, Portland	2:02
10.	"Down at the Sea"	Ray Apartments, Olympia	1:37
11.	"In My Memory"	Nakameguro, Tokyo	2:04
12.	"Honey Pot"	Nakameguro, Tokyo	1:06
13.	"The Fall"	Takashimadaira, Tokyo	1:46
14.	"Youth"	Nakameguro, Tokyo	1:57
15.	"Don't Mix the Colors"	Nakameguro, Tokyo	3:04
16.	"Foggy Eyes"	Yoyo, Olympia	2:46
17.	"Bad Seeds"	Yoyo, Olympia	1:50
18.	"I Let Him Get to Me"	Yoyo, Olympia	1:32
19.	"I Spy"	Yoyo, Olympia	1:50
20.	"Run Down the Stairs"	Yoyo, Olympia	1:55
21.	"Christmas"	Thompson Apartments, Olympia	1:24
22.	"Fourteen"	Recital hall, Olympia	1:44
23.	"Let's Kiss"	Martin Apartments, Olympia	2:46
24.	"1, 2, 3"	Martin Apartments, Olympia	1:46
25.	"In Love with You Thing"	Martin Apartments, Olympia	1:11
26.	"Look Around"	Martin Apartments, Olympia	2:45
27.	Untitled		0:10
Total length:			51:13

== Personnel ==
Adapted from original LP liner notes.

- Calvin Johnson – guitar, vocals
- Heather Lewis – drums, guitar, vocals
- Bret Lunsford – guitar, drums
- Greg Sage – producer
- Pat Maley – producer, bongos on "Bad Seeds"
