= Crashing Through (album) =

Box set by Beat Happening
- Released: May 7, 2002
- Recorded: November 27, 1983 – February 2000
- Genre: Indie rock, twee pop
- Label: K
- Producer: Beat Happening

Beat Happening chronology
You Turn Me On (1992)	Crashing Through (2002)	Music to Climb the Apple Tree By (2003)

Professional ratings
Review scores
Source	Rating
Allmusic	4.5/5 stars
Blender	4/5 stars

Crashing Through is a box set with 7 discs containing every studio album, oddities, and rare tracks by the indie rock band, Beat Happening. It was released through K Records on May 7, 2002, but is now out of print.

The box set comes complete with a booklet which includes a lengthy essay of the history, importance and impact of the band by Lois Maffeo, as well as rare photos of members Calvin Johnson, Heather Lewis, and Bret Lunsford, and a photo of Calvin with artist, musician and director G.B. Jones.

== Track listing ==
=== Disc one: Beat Happening (1985) ===
1. "Our Secret"
2. "What's Important"
3. "Down at the Sea"
4. "I Love You"
5. "Fourteen"
6. "Fun Down Stairs"
7. "Bad Seeds" (live)
8. "In My Memory"
9. "Honey Pot"
10. "The Fall"
11. "Youth"
12. "Don't Mix the Colors"
13. "Foggy Eyes"
14. "Bad Seeds"
15. "Let Him Get to Me"
16. "I Spy"
17. "Run Down the Stairs"
18. "Christmas"
19. "Fourteen"
20. "Let's Kiss"

Bonus tracks

21. "1, 2, 3"
22. "In Love with You Thing"
23. "Look Around"
24. "Bonus Track 1"

=== Disc two: Jamboree (1988) ===
1. "Bewitched"
2. "In Between"
3. "Indian Summer"
4. "Hangman"
5. "Jamboree"
6. "Ask Me"
7. "Crashing Through"
8. "Cat Walk"
9. "Drive Car Girl"
10. "Midnight A Go-Go"
11. "The This Many Boyfriends Club"

=== Disc three: Black Candy (1989) ===
1. "Other Side"
2. "Black Candy"
3. "Knick Knack"
4. "Pajama Party in a Haunted Hive"
5. "Gravedigger Blues"
6. "Cast a Shadow"
7. "Bonfire"
8. "T.V. Girl"
9. "Playhouse"
10. "Ponytail"

=== Disc four: Dreamy (1991) ===
1. "Me Untamed"
2. "Left Behind"
3. "Hot Chocolate Boy"
4. "I've Lost You"
5. "Cry for a Shadow"
6. "Collide"
7. "Nancy Sin"
8. "Fortune Cookie Prize"
9. "Revolution Come and Gone"
10. "Red Head Walking"

=== Disc five: You Turn Me On (1992) ===
1. "Tiger Trap"
2. "Noise"
3. "Pinebox Derby"
4. "Teenage Caveman"
5. "Sleepy Head"
6. "You Turn Me On"
7. "Godsend"
8. "Hey Day"
9. "Bury the Hammer"

=== Disc six: Music to Climb the Apple Tree By ===
1. "Angel Gone"
2. "Nancy Sin"
3. "Sea Hunt"
4. "Look Around"
5. "Not a Care in the World"
6. "Dreamy"
7. "That Girl"
8. "Secret Picnic Spot"
9. "Zombie Limbo Time"
10. "Foggy Eyes"
11. "Knock On Any Door"
12. "Sea Babies"
13. "Tales of a Brave Aphrodite"
14. "Polly Pereguinn"
15. "I Dig You"

=== Disc seven: Live in London 1988 ===
1. "I Love You"
2. "Cast a Shadow"
3. "Calvin Chat"
4. "Bad Seeds"
