= Music to Climb the Apple Tree By =

Compilation album by Beat Happening
- Released: September 2, 2003
- Recorded: 1984–2000
- Genre: Indie rock, twee pop
- Label: K

Beat Happening chronology
Crashing Through (2002)	Music to Climb the Apple Tree By (2003)

Professional ratings
Review scores
Source	Rating
AllMusic	4.5/5 stars
Pitchfork	7.7/10

Music to Climb the Apple Tree By is a b-sides and rarities compilation by indie rock band Beat Happening.

== Track listing ==
All tracks performed by Beat Happening.

1. "Angel Gone" – 3:12
2. "Nancy Sin" – 2:33
3. "Sea Hunt" – 5:01
4. "Look Around" – 2:57
5. "Not a Care in the World" – 3:44
6. "Dreamy" – 3:38
7. "That Girl" – 1:57
8. "Secret Picnic Spot" – 3:11
9. "Zombie Limbo Time" – 4:04
10. "Foggy Eyes" – 2:50
11. "Knock on Any Door" – 3:28
12. "Sea Babies" – 2:41
13. "Tales of Brave Aphrodite" – 2:56
14. "Polly Pereguinn" – 4:25
15. "I Dig You" – 1:58

== Track origins ==
Adapted from the liner notes:

- "Angel Gone" was recorded with Phil Elvrum in February 2000 at Dub Narcotic Studio, Olympia, Washington and released as a single (IPU 98) later that year.
- "Nancy Sin" and "Dreamy" were recorded on four-track cassette at Bret Lunsford's apartment in Anacortes, Washington in early 1990, then transferred to eight-track with additional recording done at Egg Studios, Seattle, administered by Steve Fisk and Conrad Uno. Both tracks were released as a single (IPU 15) in July 1990.
- "Sea Hunt" and "Knock on Any Door" were recorded with Steve Fisk at the Music Source, Seattle in December 1990 during sessions for the Dreamy album. They were co-released on a single by K Records and Bi-Joopiter Presents (Bi-Joop 25) in April 1991.
- "Look Around" and "That Girl" were recorded with Patrick Maley at Yo-Yo Studios in 1986 and released as the inaugural volume of the International Pop Underground series of 7" records (IPU 1) in January 1987.
- "Not a Care in the World" was recorded with Stuart Moxham at Avast!, Seattle in June 1992 during the sessions for the You Turn Me On album. It was released on a Sub Pop promotional single available through Sassy magazine in October 1992.
- "Secret Picnic Spot" was recorded with Steve Fisk in May 1990 at the Music Source, Seattle. It was released as the b-side to the "Red Head Walkin'" single on Sub Pop (SP 74) in November 1990.
- "Zombie Limbo Time" was recorded at Dub Narcotic Studio, Olympia in May 1995 and released as the b-side of the "Angel Gone" single in 2000.
- "Foggy Eyes" was recorded at the KAOS studio B in March 1984 and released on a single given away by Chemical Imbalance magazine, issue vol. 2 #2 in 1989.
- "Sea Babies", "Tales of Brave Aphrodite", "Polly Pereguinn" and "I Dig You" were recorded at the Screaming Trees practice space behind New World Video in Ellensburg, Washington in July 1987 and mixed with Steve Fisk at Albright Productions, Ellensburg. These recordings were released as the EP Beat Happening/Screaming Trees, a co-release between K and Homestead Records, in April 1988.
