= White Magic (band) =

American psychedelic folk rock group

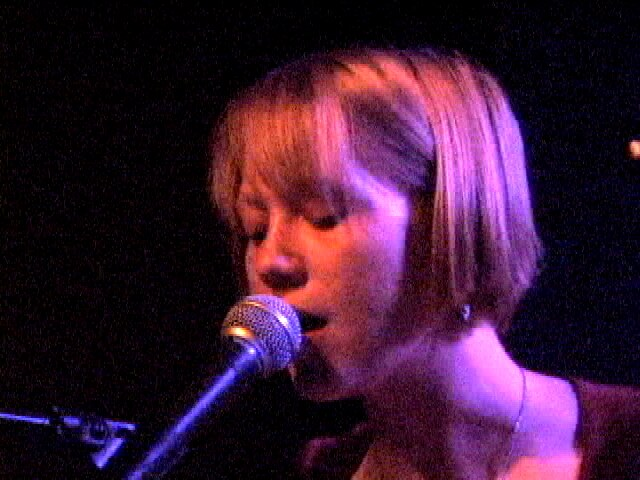
- Billotte in 2003

Background information
- Origin: Brooklyn
- Genres: Psychedelic; folk rock
- Members: Mira Billotte

White Magic is a psychedelic folk rock group formed in Brooklyn and led by singer/guitarist/pianist/composer Mira Billotte. Billotte performs under this moniker both with accompaniment or solo, using a daf, shruti box, and singing a cappella. Invoking both traditional and experimental folk, White Magic's sound ranges from loud psychedelia to meditative trance.

== History ==
White Magic's original lineup was formed in 2003, after Mira Billotte moved to New York City. Billotte composed the songs, sang and played guitar and piano. Miggy Littleton (Blood on the Wall, Ida) played drums, and Andy MacLeod played guitar. Before White Magic, Billotte played drums, sang, and composed with her sister Christina Billotte (Autoclave, Slant 6, The Casual Dots) in Quix*o*tic.

The subsequent lineup consisted of Billotte, "Sleepy" Doug Shaw (HighLife, Gang Gang Dance) on guitar, Tim Koh (Ariel Pink) on bass, and alternating drummers Tim Dewitt (Gang Gang Dance, Dutch E. Germ), Jesse Lee (Gang Gang Dance), and Jim White (Dirty Three, Cat Power, Nina Nastasia). Tim Barnes (Silver Jews), Samara Lubelski, and Shahzad Ismaily have also played with White Magic for subsequent recordings and live shows.

White Magic joined the Drag City roster in 2003, and in 2004 releasedThrough The Sun Door EP to general critical praise. They garnered attention when the song “Don't Need” appeared on the compilation The Golden Apples of the Sun (Bastet) curated by Devendra Banhart in 2004. Drag City released the band's debut full-length album Dat Rosa Mel Apibus (The Rose Gives The Bees Honey) — a reference to the Rose Cross—in 2006, followed by 2007's Dark Stars EP, with critical praise from Spin Magazine.

White Magic recorded the song “Long Time Ago” with Hal Willner, Saturday Night Live's musical director, for the compilation Rogue's Gallery: Pirate Ballads, Sea Songs, and Chanteys produced by Willner and conceived by Johnny Depp and Pirates of the Caribbean director Gore Verbinski.

In 2007, Mira Billotte recorded Bob Dylan's "As I Went Out One Morning" on the soundtrack album for the Todd Haynes film I'm Not There on Columbia Records. In USA Today, Ken Barnes stated that: "... the soundtrack was a winner, featuring such gems as...Mira Billotte's As I Went Out One Morning and the first official release of Dylan's own, stunning version of the title track.”

They also appeared on The Wire magazine's "Wire Tapper" compilation along with The Slits' “Earthbeat.” White Magic was named a 'best new band' by The Village Voice in 2008.

They toured extensively headlining in the U.S., UK and Europe, and opening for like-minded musicians including Animal Collective, Sonic Youth, Joanna Newsom, and Will Oldham. White Magic performed at many music festivals, including five of the ATP (All Tomorrow's Parties) festivals, each curated by artists, Sonic Youth, Godspeed You Black Emperor, Stephen Malkmus, Slint and Dirty Three.

In 2012, White Magic performed at both the New Folk Festival at Zorthian Ranch in Los Angeles, and at the Quiet Festival in Portland, Oregon. In 2013, Mira Billotte performed for the live score of Jem Cohen's film, "We Have an Anchor", singing her own compositions at the Brooklyn Academy of Music, along with members of Godspeed You Black Emperor, Guy Picciotto (Fugazi), and Jim White of Dirty Three. This performance was repeated in March 2015 at both the Barbican Theater in London and the Sonic Protest Festival in Paris.

In July, 2015, White Magic released “I'm Hiding My Nightingale” EP on Leaving Records. Ariel Pink played guitar accompaniment for the title track, a cover of an early Can song . Billboard Magazine reviewed the track favorably, saying ”White Magic is a lot of things -- dark, hopeful, mystical, yearning -- but it's never not lovely....” Interview magazine reviewed the track and its music video the month of its release.

Doug Shaw died from a stroke at his home in Brooklyn, on 28 May 2026, at the age of 43.

== Discography ==
Albums

- Dat Rosa Mel Apibus (2006, Drag City)

Extended plays

- Through The Sun Door EP (2004, Drag City)
- Songs of Hurt and Healing split EP with American Analog Set (2005, Ouch!)
- Dark Stars EP (2007, Drag City)
- I’m Hiding My Nightingale EP (2015, Leaving Records)

Singles

- "Katie Cruel" single (2006, Drag City)
- "New Egypt" 1-song release, limited to 1000 cds (2008, Southern)
- "White Widow" single (2011, The Mysteries)
- "Out Beyond The Moon" on LAMC#6 split 7-inch with Cass McCombs (2013, Famous Class Records)

Compilation appearances

- The Golden Apples of the Sun (Bastet)
- Wire Tapper (2004, The Wire Magazine)
- They Keep Me Smiling (2004, United Acoustic Recordings)
- "Long Time Ago" on the Rogue's Gallery: Pirate Ballads, Sea Songs, and Chanteys (2006, Anti)
- "Louise Louise" on The Sky Was A Mouth Again (2025, Diet of Worms)
