= The Casual Dots =

American band

- Origin: Washington, D.C., United States
- Genres: Indie rock; post-punk; punk rock
- Years active: 2002–present
- Labels: Kill Rock Stars; Ixor Stix
- Members: Christina Billotte (vocals, guitar); Kathi Wilcox (bass); Steve Dore (drums)

The Casual Dots is an American indie rock and post-punk band formed in 2002. The group consists of Christina Billotte, Kathi Wilcox, and Steve Dore. The band released its eponymous first studio album in 2004. After an extended period of silence they reformed for a run of concerts in 2016, and released a second album titled Sanguine Truth in 2022.

All members had previously been in several other groups. Billotte had been in Autoclave, Slant 6, and Quix*o*tic. Wilcox had been in Bikini Kill and The Frumpies.

== History ==
Kathi Wilcox, previously of Bikini Kill and The Frumpies, joined with Christina Billotte, and Steve Dore to form The Casual Dots to play Ladyfest 2002 in Washington DC. Billotte had previously played in Slant 6, Autoclave, and Quix*o*tic. Dore had been a member of the groups Deep Lust, Maude, and Huasipungo.

When they started all three members were living in Washington DC. The name of the band had been coined previously by Bikini Kill members Billy Karren and Tobi Vail, and referred to a "kind of an art project they were doing. They were sticking those office dot stickers everywhere."

Their self-titled debut album, The Casual Dots, was released in 2004 on Kill Rock Stars. It was recorded in six days at Inner Ear Studios in Arlington, Virginia, and co-produced by Guy Picciotto of Fugazi.

In 2016 they reunited for some concerts in New York City, Washington DC, and Baltimore.

In 2022, nearly two decades after their first, The Casual Dots released their second album, Sanguine Truth on Ixor Stix. It was also recorded at Inner Ear and produced by Picciotto, with engineering by Don Zientara.

== Musical style ==
The Casual Dots' sound has been called "shambly/twee postpunk" by Brooklyn Vegan and indie rock by Pitchfork. Maximum Rocknroll referred to their taking clear "inspiration from vintage soul and R&B".

== Discography ==
=== Albums ===
- The Casual Dots (2004, Kill Rock Stars)
- Sanguine Truth (2022, Ixor Stix)
