= The Shield Around the K: The Story of K Records =

- Directed by: Heather Rose Dominic
- Produced by: Heather Rose Dominic; Marguerite Ruscito (Associate Producer); Paul Seff (Associate Producer)
- Starring: Michael Azerrad; Gerard Cosloy; Steve Fisk; Calvin Johnson; Peter Kember; Ian MacKaye; Lois Maffeo; Patrick Maley; Rose Melberg; Slim Moon; Ira Robbins; Dean Wareham
- Edited by: Mario Paoli; Heather Rose Dominic
- Release dates: February 2000; July 2006 (DVD)
- Running time: 85 minutes
- Country: United States
- Language: English

The Shield Around the K: The Story of K Records is a 2000 documentary produced and directed by Heather Rose Dominic about the independent record label, K Records. The film profiles the birth and growth of the punk rock DIY label based in Olympia, Washington.

Co-founders, Calvin Johnson and Candice Pedersen are interviewed along with over 20 K artists and peers including Michael Azerrad, Timothy Brock, Gerard Cosloy, The Crabs, Steve Fisk, John Foster, John Goodmanson, Toni Holm, Rich Jensen, Peter Kember, David Lester, Bret Lunsford, Ian MacKaye, Lois Maffeo, Patrick Maley, Rose Melberg, Slim Moon, Jack Rabid, David Raugh, Ira Robbins, Jean Smith, Winston Vidor, Wandering Lucy and Dean Wareham.

Included are Super 8 music videos of Beat Happening, The Halo Benders, Lois, Mecca Normal and Tiger Trap directed by Patrick Maley and Lois Maffeo. The film also contains rare footage from the International Pop Underground Convention, a six-day festival held at the Capital Theater in Olympia, Washington in August, 1991.

== Production ==
The film was shot using a Panasonic PV-810 camera.

The majority of the film's footage was captured over two weeks in the Pacific Northwest. Interviews and locations were shot in Anacortes, Washington; New York, New York; Olympia, Washington; Philadelphia, Pennsylvania; Portland, Oregon; Seattle, Washington; Vancouver, British Columbia; Vancouver, Washington and Washington, D.C.

== DVD special features ==
IPU Footage

- Beat Happening: Cast a Shadow
- Beat Happening: Revolution Come & Gone
- Mecca Normal: He Didn't Say
- Mecca Normal: Walk Alone

== Reception ==
The film played to a sold-out audience at the 2000 New York Underground Film Festival and went on to receive invitational screenings at over 20 film festivals in Canada, England, Germany, Sweden and the United States.

The Shield Around the K garnered favorable reviews from over 50 national and international publications including Spin, Jane, Record Collector, and Time Out New York.

The film was referenced in Our Band Could Be Your Life: Scenes from the American Indie Underground, 1981-1991 written by Michael Azerrad and published by Little, Brown and Company, 2001.
