= Autoclave (disambiguation) =

An autoclave is a pressure chamber used to sterilize equipment and supplies.

Autoclave may also refer to:

- Autoclave (industrial), utilized to process parts and materials under pressure, as in curing
- Waste autoclave, a form of solid waste treatment
- Autoclave (album), a 1991 indie rock album
- Autoclave (band), a short-lived indie rock band
- Autoclave cipher, a cipher which incorporates the message into the key
- "Autoclave", the fourth track on The Mountain Goats 2008 album, Heretic Pride
