= Mistake (album) =

Studio album by D+
- Released: October 1st, 2002
- Recorded: November 2001 – March 2002
- Studio: Signal Path Studios
- Genre: Alternative rock
- Length: 32:13
- Label: Knw-Yr-Own; K Records
- Producer: D+

Professional ratings
Review scores
Source	Rating
AllMusic	3/5 stars
Pitchfork	7.1/10

Mistake is the third studio album by American indie rock band D+, released in 2002.

== Track listing ==
1. "Mistake" – 4:40
2. "The Business" – 3:44
3. "God Beyond God" – 5:53
4. "Are You Done" – 0:53
5. "Megadose" – 2:37
6. "What's Not To Fall In Love With" – 4:42
7. "You're So Right" – 3:27
8. "Take You For Granted" – 3:53

== Personnel ==
- Bret Lunsford
- Karl Blau – bass, vocals
- Phil Elvrum
- D+ – Recording
- Liz Guy/Sprout – viola
- Dave Matthies – additional recording
