= Jamboree (Beat Happening album) =

Studio album by Beat Happening
- Released: January 29, 1988
- Recorded: 1987
- Genre: Indie rock, twee pop
- Length: 23:58
- Label: K, Rough Trade
- Producer: Steve Fisk, Mark Lanegan, Gary Lee Conner

Beat Happening chronology
Beat Happening (1985)	Jamboree (1988)	Black Candy (1989)

Jamboree is the second studio album by American indie rock band Beat Happening, released in 1988 through K Records and Rough Trade Records. All songs were produced by Steve Fisk with assistance from Screaming Trees members Mark Lanegan and Gary Lee Conner (who plays a brief guitar solo on "Midnight a Go-Go"), except "Cat Walk," produced by Patrick Maley, and "The This Many Boyfriends Club," recorded live by Rich Jensen.

== Content ==
The album marks a darker approach to the twee pop for which the band is known, due largely to an increased use of guitar distortion, more professional production, and increased emphasis on Calvin Johnson's deep voice than in the group's earlier recordings. The majority of the songs are sung by Calvin Johnson, while Heather Lewis only provides vocals on two songs, the uncharacteristically brash "In Between" and the more typically understated "Ask Me." At the time of the album's release, Johnson described Jamboree's sound as "dark and sexy." Still, the band retained their emphasis on exuberance over musicianship, as Bret Lunsford stated in an interview that, while recording album opener "Bewitched," his guitar string got stuck on a protruding screw and he continued to play through the song, hitting the string a bit harder until it became unstuck. Author Dave Thompson, in his book Alternative Rock (2000), wrote that it "captur[es] the same aura of unamplified amplification" as on Rock 'n' Roll with the Modern Lovers (1977) by Jonathan Richman and the Modern Lovers.

== Release and reception ==
Professional ratings
Review scores
Source	Rating
AllMusic	4.5/5 stars
Alternative Rock	8/10
NME	9/10
Pitchfork	8.6/10
Tiny Mix Tapes	5/5
The Village Voice	B−

Jamboree and the accompanying Crashing Through EP were Beat Happening's first releases to garner widespread distribution, as the result of K Records linking with Sub Pop. Johnson had previously contributed to a fanzine put out by Sub Pop prior to the existence of the band. It got additional attention thanks to Fisk, Mark Lanegan and Gary Lee Conner of Screaming Trees working on the album. Beat Happening and Screaming Trees would later issue a split EP, Beat Happening/Screaming Trees, that same year.

AllMusic said of the album: "...each cut is a marvel of innocence and ingenuity." Thompson saw it as a "rougher, more varied set than the defiantly monotone debut, where ghosts of The Cramps and the grunge-to-come collide in deft delirium."

Two tracks from Jamboree, "Bewitched" and "Indian Summer," were listed as essential listening in Pitchfork's 2005 article on twee pop entitled "Twee as Fuck." "Indian Summer" is perhaps the group's best-known song, as it was covered by dream pop group Luna, whose lead singer, Dean Wareham, joked in The Shield Around the K: The Story of K Records, a documentary film on the history of Johnson's K Records, that the song was "indie's 'Knocking on Heaven's Door'-- everybody's done it." The song was also covered by Ben Gibbard for the soundtrack to the Kurt Cobain documentary About a Son; Jamboree was reportedly one of Cobain's favorite albums.

== Track listing ==
All tracks were written by Beat Happening.

Side one
No.	Title	Length
1.	"Bewitched"	3:06
2.	"In Between"	2:21
3.	"Indian Summer"	3:05
4.	"Hangman"	2:31
5.	"Jamboree"	0:58

Side two
No.	Title	Length
1.	"Ask Me"	1:16
2.	"Crashing Through"	1:16
3.	"Cat Walk"	1:58
4.	"Drive Car Girl"	2:00
5.	"Midnight a Go-Go"	2:18
6.	"The This Many Boyfriends Club"	3:18
Total length:		23:58
