= A Wonderful Beast =

Studio album by Calvin Johnson
- Released: October 12, 2018
- Length: 38:46
- Label: K
- Producer: Patrick Carney

Calvin Johnson chronology
This Party Is Just Getting Started (2016)	A Wonderful Beast (2018)

Professional ratings
Aggregate scores
Source	Rating
Metacritic	69/100
Review scores
Source	Rating
AllMusic	3.5/5 stars
Exclaim!	6/10
Pitchfork	7.8/10

A Wonderful Beast is the fifth studio album by Beat Happening's lead vocalist Calvin Johnson. It was released on October 12, 2018, through K Records.

== Track listing ==
No.	Title	Length
1.	"Kiss Me Sweetly"	3:21
2.	"A Wonderful Beast"	4:10
3.	"Like You Do"	3:06
4.	"Wherefore Art Thou"	3:49
5.	"Are We Ready"	2:50
6.	"Bubbles, Clouds and Rainbows"	3:52
7.	"Blues Come Runnin'"	3:00
8.	"Why You Crying"	2:52
9.	"Another Teardrop Falls"	3:38
10.	"When the Weekend Comes Around"	3:55
11.	"(I've Still Got) Sand in My Shoes"	4:13
