= Crashing Through =

Crashing Through may refer to:

- Crashing Through (album), a 2002 box set by Beat Happening
- Crashing Through (film), a 1928 American silent Western film

== See also ==
- Crashing Thru (disambiguation)
