= The Go Team =

Band from Washington, United States of America

- Origin: Olympia, Washington
- Genres: Indie rock
- Years active: 1985–1989
- Labels: K Records
- Past members: Calvin Johnson; Tobi Vail

The Go Team was a 1980s band from Olympia, Washington, consisting of Tobi Vail and Calvin Johnson of Beat Happening.

== Career ==
The Go Team was founded in 1985. As Vail described:

The Go Team was about process. Sometimes we'd deliberately leave stuff out to incite participation in the listener. Donna Parker Pop, our first K release, featured all instrumentals but included the statement 'Make up your own words and sing along' - and people did. We recorded with some of those people later. . . . On the one hand we were trying to demystify music and encourage people to play songs in public -- if they wanted to. On the other hand, we actually liked what we sounded like, and we hated most of the pro-sounding jam bands/shredding metal-punk bands that played parties in Olympia. We embraced chaos and rejected mastery.

The Go Team released several cassettes and 9 singles on the independent label K Records. The records were often collaborations with other musicians and the musical style varied from single to single. Kurt Cobain of Nirvana, Billy Karren, The Legend!, David Nichols of The Cannanes, Donna Dresch of Team Dresch, Lois Maffeo, Rich Jensen, and Jeffery Kennedy were some of the artists the duo worked with. Billy "Boredom" Karren was one of the rotating musicians who played with The Go Team, and it was in this band that he and Vail played together for the first time, later collaborating in several other bands like Bikini Kill, The Frumpies, the upallnighters, and Spray Painted Love. They toured the West Coast as a two-piece, adding Billy Karren for two U.S. tours.

Tobi Vail went on to form Bikini Kill with Kathleen Hanna, Kathi Wilcox and occasional Go Team member, Billy Karren. Presently, she plays with the band Spider and the Webs. Calvin Johnson currently records as a solo artist and with The Hive Dwellers, and continues to operate K Records.

== Discography ==
=== Singles ===
- "Sand"/"Jigsaw" (January 1989)
- "Outside"/"Stay Ready" (February 1989) with Billy Karren, Louise Olsen, David Nichols
- "Breakfast in Bed"/"Safe Little Circles" (March 1989) with The Legend!
- "Milquetoast Brigade"/"She Was Sad" (April 1989) with Jeffery Kennedy
- "Ribeye"/"935 Patterson" (May 1989)
- "Go Team Call"/"Three Ways to Sunday" (June 1989) with Quang H., Billy Karren, Brad Clemmons
- "Scratch It Out"/"Bikini Twilight" (July 1989) with Tamra Ohrmund, Louise Olsen, Donna Dresch, Kurt Cobain
- "Tummy Hop"/"Maverick Summer" (August 1989) with Brad Clemmons
- "The Pines of Rome" (September 1989) with Brad Clemmons

=== Cassettes ===
- Recorded Live at the Washington Center for the Performing Arts
- Your Pretty Guitar (with Steve Peters)
- Archer Come Sparrow
- Donna Parker Pop
