= Look Around =

Look Around may refer to:

== Music ==
=== Albums ===
- Look Around (Anthony Rapp album), 2000 — or its title track
- Look Around (Beat Happening album), 2015 — or its title track
- Look Around (Sérgio Mendes album), 1968 — or its title track

=== Songs ===
- "Look Around", by Blues Traveler from Four, 1994
- "Look Around", by Orson from Bright Idea, 2006
- "Look Around" (song), by the Red Hot Chili Peppers from I'm With You, 2011
- "Look Around", by Snoop Dogg from From tha Streets 2 tha Suites, 2021
- "Look Around", by Stevie Wonder from Where I'm Coming From, 1971

== Other uses ==
- Look Around (Apple), feature of Apple Maps

== See also ==
- Look Around You, a British television series
