= Billotte =

Billotte is a surname. Notable people with the surname include:

- Christina Billotte (born 1969), American singer, songwriter, and guitarist
- Gaston Billotte (1875–1940), French Army general
- Pierre Billotte (1906–1992), French Army general and politician, son of Gaston
