= Inzombia =

Inzombia may refer to:

- Inzombia (album), a 1995 album by Slant 6
- Inzombia (mixtape), a 2016 mixtape by Belly
