= What Was Me =

Studio album by Calvin Johnson
- Released: July 16, 2002
- Genre: Rock
- Label: K Records
- Producer: Calvin Johnson, Phil Elverum, Adam Forkner

Calvin Johnson chronology
What Was Me (2002)	Before the Dream Faded... (2006)

Professional ratings
Review scores
Source	Rating
Allmusic	4/5 stars

What Was Me is the first solo record by K Records founder and Beat Happening member Calvin Johnson. It is a sparse record with most of the tracks containing only voice and guitar. Calvin duets with fellow Pacific Northwestern musician Mirah on "Ode To St. Valentine" and Beth Ditto, the lead singer of The Gossip, on "Lightnin' Rod for Jesus."

== Track listing ==
1. The Past Comes Back to Haunt Me – 4:26
2. Can We Kiss? – 4:10
3. Love Will Come Back Again – 4:04
4. Ode to St. Valentine – 1:28
5. Palriga – 6:14
6. Nothing to Hold Us Here – 2:17
7. Warm Days – 4:27
8. Lies Goodbye – 3:33
9. Lightnin' Rod for Jesus – 2:57
10. What Was Me – 3:26
