= Dandelion Seeds =

1998 studio album by D+

Studio album by D+
- Released: August 5, 1998
- Studio: Dub Narcotic Studio
- Genre: lo-fi indie rock
- Length: 32:13
- Label: Knw-Yr-Own
- Producer: D+

Professional ratings
Review scores
Source	Rating
AllMusic	4/5 stars

Dandelion Seeds is the second studio album by Anacortes based indie rock band D+, released in 1998.

== Track listing ==
1. "Cut it Out" – 3:56
2. "Green Party" – 4:31
3. "Don't Worry About Me" – 5:06
4. "Dandelion Wine" – 4:23
5. "Profits are Soaring" – 3:22
6. "Rusted" – 4:20
7. "My Best Day" – 3:28
8. "His Heels" – 3:07

== Personnel ==
- Bret Lunsford – guitars, vocals
- Karl Blau – bass, vocals
- Phil Elvrum – drums
