= The Old Haunts =

US musical group

- Origin: Olympia, WA, United States
- Genres: Indie rock, garage rock, swamp rock, alternative rock
- Years active: 2001 – 2009
- Labels: Kill Rock Stars
- Members: Craig Extine; Scott Seckington; Tobi Vail
- Past members: Danny Sasaki; Natalie Cox; Chris Sutton; Curtis James
- Website: The Old Haunts

The Old Haunts are a rock music band formed in 2001 in Olympia, Washington. The band is sometimes defined as punk but exhibits additional qualities similar to southern swamp rock. Arpeggiated twangy guitar riffs, pounding bass lines and rock drumming are major features of the group's sound.

== Band members ==
Principal members of the band are the founders Craig Extine (guitar, vocals) and Scott Seckington (bass), and the band's current drummer, Tobi Vail. Vail is a member of Bikini Kill and The Frumpies. Past drummers for The Old Haunts include founding member Curtis James, Natalie Cox, Danny Sasaki, and Chris Sutton, most of who have played with other Olympia bands. James was in Serum Greys and Excuse 17; Sasaki was a member of Mocket; Cox came from Popular Music; and Sutton had been in Dub Narcotic Sound System.

== Discography ==
Before signing with the Kill Rock Stars label, The Old Haunts released a pair of independent EPs, and a full-length album, Collection, which combines both.

With a steady core membership of Extine and Seckington, the band recorded three full-length albums for Kill Rock Stars:

- Fallow Field (2005) – This first album draws heavily upon the earlier EPs for material, and features the distinctively different drum styles of Sasaki, Cox, and Sutton.
- Fuel on Fire (2006) – Re-joined by original drummer, Curtis James, who played drums on all songs; this album shows a more consistent overall sound, sometimes described as "swamp-punk".
- Poisonous Times (2008) – Tobi Vail plays drums on the band's third album. Although she is known for the fast paces of Bikini Kill, she meets the varying and subtle needs of Extine's "increasingly adventurous" songwriting – the album is described as the band's "most diverse release" to date.

The band contributed the song "By the Bay" to the Kill Rock Stars compilation Otis' Opuses (2006).
