= Teenage Caveman =

Teenage Caveman may refer to:

- Teenage Caveman (1958 film), black-and-white science fiction film
- Teenage Caveman (2002 film), science fiction/horror film
- "Teenage Caveman", a song by Beat Happening from the 1992 album You Turn Me On
