= Soda Pop * Rip Off =

Studio album by Slant 6
- Released: 1994
- Genre: Punk rock
- Length: 34:04
- Label: Dischord
- Producers: Ian MacKaye, Don Zientara

Slant 6 chronology
What Kind of Monster Are You (1993)	Soda Pop * Rip Off (1994)	Inzombia (1995)

Soda Pop * Rip Off is the debut album by American punk rock band Slant 6. It was released in 1994 by Dischord.

== Reception ==
Professional ratings
Review scores
Source	Rating
AllMusic	4/5 stars
Robert Christgau	(dud)
The Encyclopedia of Popular Music	3/5 stars

AllMusic rated the album favorably, although it noted that it "works almost like a retrospective of a period in the band's career." Trouser Press wrote that "the combo delivers succinct but clunky punk rock highlighted by unexpectedly strong pop hooks and occasionally odd instrumental angularities." The Encyclopedia of Popular Music praised Slant 6's ability to "tackle topical subjects from unexpected angles." The Chicago Reader wrote that "as with early Wire, Slant 6 avoid any sort of excess, saying their bit and moving on."

Reviewing the 2014 reissue, the Washington City Paper wrote: "Though her voice was occasionally hidden behind distorted guitars and nasal delivery, [Christina] Billotte was still a better singer than many of her ‘90s contemporaries, a fact that’s perhaps more evident on the remaster." Including Soda Pop * Rip Off on its list of essential riot grrrl albums, Rolling Stone wrote that the band "held up the capital city’s end with grooves like 'Time Expired,' goofing on Nuggets-style Sixties garage rock but with a sense of menace." Pitchfork called it "an enduring model of punk rock poise." Evelyn McDonnell and Elisabeth Vincentelli, writing for the New York Times in 2019, considered Soda Pop-Rip Off "arguably the best album of the riot grrrl era."

== Track listing ==
Side A

1. "Don't You Ever?" - 1:43
2. "Night X 9" - 1:32
3. "Love Shock" - 2:32
4. "Double Edged Knife" - 2:14
5. "Time Expired" - 2:25
6. "Invisible Footsteps" - 2:25

Side B

1. "Poison Arrows Shot at Heroes" - 2:14
2. "Don't Censor Me" - 2:14
3. "Blood Song" - 1:34
4. "Soda Pop-Rip Off" - 2:06
5. "Become Your Ghost" - 1:57
6. "Blue Angel" - 2:13
7. "March 6" - 2:10

== Album credits ==
- Don Zientara, Engineer
- Slant 6, Producer, main performer
- Ian MacKaye, Producer
- Christina Billotte, Guitar, drums, vocals
- Myra Power, Bass, vocals
- Ian Svenonius, Photography
- Marge Marshall, Trumpet, drums
