= Before the Dream Faded... =

Studio album by Calvin Johnson
- Released: October 25, 2005
- Genre: Rock
- Label: K Records
- Producer: Calvin Johnson, Phil Elverum, Mirah Yom Tov Zietlyn, Khaela Maricich

Calvin Johnson chronology
What Was Me (2002)	Before the Dream Faded... (2006)	Calvin Johnson & The Sons of the Soil (2007)

Professional ratings
Review scores
Source	Rating
Allmusic	link

Before the Dream Faded... is the second album of DIY guru Calvin Johnson. It features production and instrumentation from such K Records regulars as Phil Elverum, Mirah, Khaela Maricich, Adam Forkner and Jona Bechtolt. The album was released in October 2005 to mostly positive reviews.

== Track listing ==
1. "When Hearts Turn Blue" – 3:33
2. "Rabbit Blood" – 2:51
3. "Red Wing Black" – 5:09
4. "Obliteration Overload" – 4:49
5. "I Am Without" – 5:51
6. "I'm Down" – 4:55
7. "The Leaves of Tea" – 3:18
8. "Your Eyes" – 4:22
9. "Deliverance" – 3:35
10. "When You Are Mine" – 8:10
