= Cool Rays =

American rock band

Cool Rays was a rock band formed by five Evergreen State College (Olympia, Washington, US) students in late 1980. The band is especially notable as Calvin Johnson's first ensemble and one of the earlier expressions of the Olympia music scene that developed in the 1980s and 1990s.

Johnson wrote most of the band's songs, with assistance on lyrics from Ed Gaidrich. The entire band worked together to set Johnson's lyrics to music. Cool Rays played at least one cover song: Jonathan Richman's "Modern World". The songwriting characteristics associated with Johnson's later work (simple stories, childlike sensibilities, use of catchy phrases from American vernacular, quirky juxtaposition of words and ideas, etc.) are present in their earliest form in his Cool Rays compositions, as is Johnson's "uniquely deep, droning singing voice"

== Members ==
- Calvin Johnson – vocals, guitar
- Cathy Watson (see Doll Squad) – bass guitar
- Ed Gaidrich— saxophone, vocals
- Tony Traverso – guitar
- Tracy Taylor – drums

== Biography ==
During its short existence, the band played several concerts in Olympia and one in Portland, Oregon. The band had more musical creativity than musicianship, with two of the band members having taken up instruments for the first time just to be able to participate.

While certainly not the first amateur girl and boy band to come along, Cool Rays embodied what became some of the motivating ideas (and ideals) of the Olympia music scene: that one need not be a formally trained or professional (or stereotyped) musician to make music; local people should make their own music (rather than passively relying on the "corporate ogre" music business to provide it); and girls should play a more active role in the making of rock music.

Cool Rays benefited from a devoted following among certain students and downtown Olympia residents, however, the group's popularity did not spread far. In the late 1970s, many younger music listeners had not embraced punk and other emerging genres. Local tastes tended toward hard rock, psychedelic and folk-rock musical motifs.

The band dispersed in the summer of 1981, after the end of the Evergreen State College academic year.

Cool Rays is briefly referenced in Our Band Could Be Your Life by Michael Azerrad (Little Brown, 2001).

== Discography ==
In spring 1981, Cool Rays made an unpublished audio cassette produced by Steve Fisk and recorded in the recording studios of the Evergreen State College. A few of the compositions from that cassette were subsequently released as part of compilations of Olympia- and Seattle-based artists:

- SubPop5 (Sub Pop, 1981)
- Absolute Elsewhere (Mr. Brown Records, 1982)
- Let's Together (K Records, 1984)
