= D+ (band) =

American indie rock band

- Origin: Anacortes, Washington
- Genre: Indie rock
- Years active: 1996–present
- Labels: Knw-Yr-Own; K Records; P.W. Elverum & Sun
- Members: Bret Lunsford; Karl Blau; Phil Elverum

D+ is an indie rock band based in Anacortes, Washington. Formed in 1996 by singer/guitarist Bret Lunsford and singers/multi-instrumentalists Karl Blau and Phil Elverum, the band is perhaps best known for Lunsford's droll vocals and witty wordplay, and a minimalist, ramshackle sound.

== Discography ==
=== Full length LPs ===
- D+ (Knw-Yr-Own / K Records 1997)
- Dandelion Seeds (Knw-Yr-Own / K Records 1998)
- Mistake (Knw-Yr-Own 2002)
- Deception Pass (Knw-Yr-Own 2003)
- No Mystery (P.W. Elverum & Sun 2006)
- On Purpose (Knw-Yr-Own 2008) ("hits, rarities, and live cuts")
- What is Doubt For? (Knw-Yr-Own 2008)
- Destroy Before Listening (Knw-Yr-Own 2018)

=== Singles ===
- "Book" b/w "Heatherwood" (K Records 1996)

=== Compilation appearances ===
"Clever Knot" on "Yeti No. 500"

- "Pandora Balks" on Free The Bird: What the Heck Fest Sampler 2006 (Kelp Monthly 2006)
- "Red White & Blue Lite" on Flotsam & Jetsam: What the Heck Fest Sampler 2005 (Kelp Monthly 2005)
- "Why Oh Why Oh" on What the Heck Fest Sampler 2003 (Knw-Yr-Own 2003)
- "Take You For Granted" on Shipwreck Day (Knw-Yr-Own 2002)
- "Up and Died" on Remote Wing (Knw-Yr-Own 2001)
