= Autoclave (album) =

Studio album by Autoclave
- Released: 1997, 2002
- Genre: Indie rock; math rock; post-punk; punk rock
- Length: 27:36
- Label: Dischord Records
- Producer: Barrett Jones

Professional ratings
Review scores
Source	Rating
AllMusic	2.5/5 stars
Pitchfork	8.6/10

Autoclave is a posthumous compilation album by the indie math rock band Autoclave.

The CD-only release compiles their two Mira/Dischord EPs (originally released as one 7″ and one 10″), their song from the Simple Machines Records Lever compilation 7″, plus the live favorite Paper Boy – a cover of the theme song from the video game of the same name.

It was released by Dischord Records in 1997, and was later remastered at Silver Sonya Studios and reissued in 2002 by Dischord and Mira Records. A 12" vinyl LP version was released in 2019.

== Critical reception ==
A 2019 compilation of Autoclave's material garnered their music newfound recognition. Bandcamp Daily called it "a key indie text" that "sits in its own special corner of the already glorified 1990s alt-rock canon." Maximum Rocknroll wrote that "Christina’s voice is truly beautiful, the lyrics are so perceptive and thoughtful and her basslines remind me of Wire songs and Nikki’s and Mary’s chopped up guitars over it are a textural dream."

In 2016, Treblezine placed the track "Go Far" amongst 25 essential Dischord Records songs. Bandcamp Daily listed the compilation amongst the label's "hidden gems" in 2025.

== Track listing ==
1. Go Far - 3:04
2. I'll Take You Down - 3:48
3. It's Not Real Life - 1:56
4. Dr. Seuss - 2:23
5. Still Here - 2:59
6. Hot Spurr - 2:43
7. Vision - 1:39
8. Bulls Eye - 2:18
9. I'll Take You Down (version) - 3:30
10. Summer - 2:13
11. Paper Boy - 1:03

== Personnel ==
- Christina Billotte - vocals, bass, drums on 11
- Mary Timony - guitar, vocals
- Nikki Chapman - guitar, vocals on 8
- Melissa Berkoff - drums, bass and words on 11

Recorded by Barrett Jones, Geoff Turner, Alec Bourgeois and mixed by Brendan Canty
