= Crashing Thru =

Crashing Thru may refer to:

- Crashing Thru (1949 film), an American western film
- Crashing Thru (1939 film), an American northern action film
- Crashin' Thru, a 1923 American silent Western film

== See also ==
- Crashing Through (disambiguation)
