= Autoclave (band) =

American indie rock band

Background information
- Origin: Washington, D.C., United States
- Genres: Math rock; indie rock; noise rock
- Years active: 1990–1991
- Labels: Dischord; K; Mira
- Spinoffs: Slant 6; Helium
- Past members: Mary Timony; Christina Billotte; Nikki Chapman; Melisa Berkoff
- Website: www.dischord.com

Autoclave was an American indie rock band, based in Washington, D.C. Their releases were on local label Dischord Records. Formed in the summer of 1990, the group consisted of vocalist and bassist Christina Billotte, lead guitarist Mary Timony, guitarist Nikki Chapman, and drummer Melissa Berkoff.

== History ==
Members Christina Billote and Melissa Berkoff began playing together in Washington D.C. in 1989, at that time in the band Hazmat. They later united with Nikki Chapman and Mary Timony, forming Autoclave. On the Dischord label, a split release between Dischord and K Records in Olympia, Washington, they released the Go Far 7-inch EP record in 1991. Prior to the band splitting up, the band released a second 10-inch record on Mira Records (the label belonging to Billote) and Dischord Records,

The group broke up in May 1991, with Timony forming Helium in Boston and Billotte forming Slant 6 in D.C. Timony would later release solo albums on Lookout!, Matador, and Merge, and release music as a member of Wild Flag and Ex Hex. Billotte later formed Quix-ot-ic and The Casual Dots.

Autoclave became known for their intelligent, off-kilter brand of rock that featured sophisticated songwriting and the use of compound and changing meters, thus affiliating them to some extent with the math rock movement. Mira and Dischord released Autoclave's self-titled compilation in 1997. Writing for the New York Times, Elisabeth Vincentelli considered Go Far an essential riot grrrl release and the later compilation "a treasure trove of arrhythmic beats and elliptical lyrics."

== Discography ==
Anthologies

- Autoclave (1997), Mira/Dischord (compiles all the songs from the EPs, plus two songs) – Re-released on CD in 2002 – Remastered and re-released (with different track order) on vinyl in 2019

EPs

- Go Far (1991), DisKord (Dischord/K)
- Autoclave (1992), Mira/Dischord

Compilation appearances

- The Machines: 1990–1993 (1994)
