= Doll Squad =

American rock band

- Origin: Seattle, Washington, United States
- Genres: Alternative rock, power pop
- Years active: 1987-1989, 2008-present
- Spinoff of: The Corn Dogs
- Members: Mara Dralle; Helen Halloran; Annette Billesbach; Mike Soldano; Rich Evans
- Past members: Cathy Watson; Patty Schemel

Doll Squad is an American alternative rock band formed in Seattle, Washington in 1987 by Mara Dralle (lead vocals) and Helen Halloran (vocals, rhythm guitar) and originally active until 1989. Though not signed to any record label, the band received notoriety in the Seattle music scene after performing with Nirvana in 1988. Following their dissolution the following year, members of the band embarked on separate musical projects. In 2008, the band reformed, however without original drummer Patty Schemel, who later became notable as the drummer of Los Angeles-based band Hole.

== History ==
=== Formation and original career: 1987-1989 ===
Doll Squad formed in 1987 after the break-up of a "loose-knit" musical project known as The Corn Dogs. Former members Mara Dralle and Helen Halloran were "determined to find an all-female line up" and subsequently formed the band after recruiting lead guitarist Cathy Watson (see Cool Rays) and then drummer Patty Schemel, who was a member of hardcore punk band The Primitives the previous year, and was recommended to Dralle at the suggestion of Bon Von Wheelie of Girl Trouble. After finding bassist Annette Billesbach, the band began rehearsing and performing. The band's first show was held at the Community World Theater in Tacoma, Washington on November 14, 1987, alongside Catbutt and Girl Trouble. A month prior to their second show at the venue, the band recorded a demo tape which consisted of six songs, five of which were originals and one was a cover of Sonny Bono and Cher's "I Got You Babe." Another two of the band's shows were significant as they headlined Sub Pop Sunday at Seattle's Vogue Theatre and a June 5, 1988 show saw the band come close to perform with iconic grunge band Nirvana, who decided not to perform due to the sparse attendance.

During their original run, Doll Squad also performed on The Spud Goodman Show and in two straight-to-video movies: Rock & Roll Mobster Girls and Attack of the Hideo-Poid. An excerpt from former movie, featuring Halloran, is also featured in Hype! (1996).

=== Break-up and other projects: 1990-2007 ===
In 1989, just as the grunge movement was progressing in Seattle, Doll Squad disbanded. Watson moved to Portland OR and formed the band Mr. Seed which was active through 1994. Halloran (who is now known under her stage name, Miss Hell'N) went on to sing and play guitar for the band Los Peligrosos. Dralle went on to, and continues to, sing and occasionally perform with her husband, Carl Funk, formerly of The Allies. Schemel went on to achieve notable acclaim as the drummer of alternative rock band Hole from 1992 to 1998, and played drums on the band's most critically acclaimed studio album, Live Through This (1994), as well as several other releases.

=== Reformation and present: 2008-present ===
In April 2008, Doll Squad reformed with Dralle, Halloran and Billesbach reuniting. As Watson and Schemel were unable to, or chose not to, rejoin the band, they were replaced by Mike Soldano on lead guitar and Rich Evans on drums, respectively. That year, the band played three shows and have to yet announce further developments.

== Musical style and influences ==
The band had a slight punk rock sound, however alternative rock and powerpop dominated their musical style. The band list their influences, both past and present, as Sweet, Redd Kross, The Go-Gos, X, The Clash, Joan Jett, The Bangles, The Runaways and Sonny and Cher.

== Members ==
Current line-up

- Mara Dralle - lead vocals (1987–1989, 2008–present)
- Helen Halloran - rhythm guitar, backing vocals (1987–1989, 2008–present)
- Annette Billesbach - bass (1987–1989, 2008–present)
- Mike Soldano - lead guitar (2008–present)
- Rich Evans - drums (2008–present)

Former members

- Cathy Watson - lead guitar (1987–1989)
- Patty Schemel - drums (1987–1989)
- JC Thomas - Bass (1989)
- Dina - guitar (1989)
