= Kathi Wilcox =

American musician (born 1969)

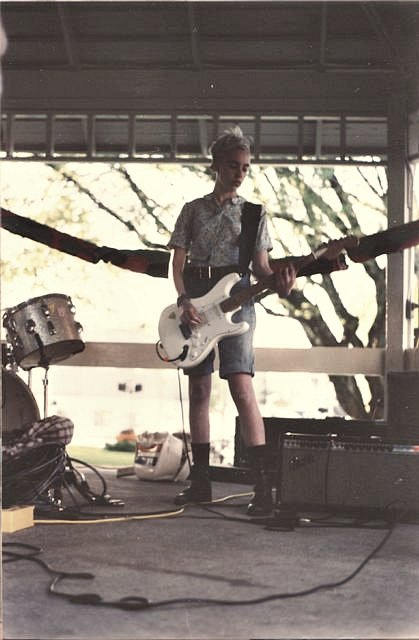
- Wilcox in 1991

Background information
- Born: November 19, 1969 (age 56)
- Genres: Riot grrrl; punk rock
- Occupation: Musician
- Instruments: Guitar; bass guitar; drums
- Years active: 1990–present
- Label: Kill Rock Stars
- Member of: Bikini Kill; The Julie Ruin; The Casual Dots
- Formerly of: The Frumpies; The Feebles; Star Sign Scorpio

Kathi Lynn Wilcox (born November 19, 1969) is an American musician. She is the bass player in Bikini Kill and guitar player in The Casual Dots. She was also a member of the Julie Ruin and the Frumpies.

== Music career ==
Wilcox attended The Evergreen State College where she studied film and worked with Tobi Vail at a sandwich shop. During this time she and friends Kathleen Hanna and Vail collaborated on a feminist zine titled Bikini Kill. The three women enlisted guitarist Billy Karren and began a feminist punk band also called Bikini Kill. Wilcox provided bass, guitar, drums, and vocals for the band, which lasted throughout the '90s and is considered one of the definitive bands of the riot grrrl movement.

Wilcox's other musical projects include The Frumpies with Vail, Karren, Michelle Mae (The Make-Up), and Molly Neuman (Bratmobile); The Casual Dots with Christina Billotte (Slant 6, Quix*o*tic) and Steve Dore; and The Julie Ruin with Hanna, Kenny Mellman (Kiki & Herb), Carmine Covelli, and Sara Landeau.

Wilcox collaborated with Fugazi's Brendan Canty on the theme song to the punk rock-oriented children's show Pancake Mountain.

== Personal life ==
Wilcox is married to Guy Picciotto from Fugazi. They have one child and live in Brooklyn.
