= Slacker rock =

Subgenre of indie rock

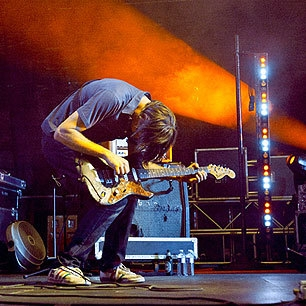
- Stephen Malkmus during pioneering slacker rock band Pavement's 2010 reunion tour
- Other names: Slack rock; lo-fi (early); lo-fi indie
- Stylistic origins: Alternative rock; indie rock; lo-fi music; garage rock; noise pop; noise rock
- Cultural origins: Late 1980s to early 1990s, United States
- Derivative forms: Bedroom pop; shitgaze

Other topics
- Shoegaze; post-punk revival; garage rock revival

Slacker rock (originally known as lo-fi or lo-fi indie) is a subgenre of indie rock that emerged in the United States during the late 1980s to early 1990s. Characterized by a rejection (or minimization) of technical proficiency and production quality, in favor of stripped down lo-fi aesthetics and an apathetic singing style, the style was originally associated with Generation X slacker culture. It experienced a resurgence during the 2000s and 2010s amongst Millennials and Gen Z.

== Etymology and characteristics ==
Slacker rock was initially intertwined with "slacker" culture which emerged in the 1980s and 1990s amongst Generation X, with its association with a specific cultural attitude being primarily popularized by director Richard Linklater's 1990 cult film, Slacker.

The term "slacker" described a teenager that showcased a nonchalant attitude and general blasé approach to life. Slacker rock became musically reflective of slacker culture, employing less emphasis on technical proficiency and production quality, in favor of stripped down lo-fi aesthetics and an apathetic singing style.

== History ==
=== 1980s–1990s: Origins ===
Slacker rock emerged out of the American indie and college rock scene, originally drawing influence from alternative rock bands like Sonic Youth, Pixies, and Dinosaur Jr. as well as 1980s cassette era lo-fi artists like Beat Happening and Daniel Johnston, earlier influences included New Zealand's Dunedin sound which featured bands such as the Clean and Chris Knox's Tall Dwarfs.

During the 1980s, slacker rock first came to prominence through the indie rock scene, though initially referred to as "lo-fi", the music was associated with bands like Guided by Voices who formed in 1983 and treated low-fidelity analog recording as an intentional musical aesthetic, which had previously been viewed as a negative technological limitation. By the late 1980s to early 1990s, the American lo-fi movement began to gain prominence in the alternative and DIY underground music scene, with the sound evolving into a distinct indie rock genre popularized by bands like the Lemonheads, Camper Van Beethoven and Pavement. Other notable bands include Built to Spill, Sebadoh, and Sparklehorse.

Slacker rock saw its commercial height in the 1990s with popular artists like Beck. During the mid-1990s, Weezer merged the genre with influences from pop music. Their more commercial take was mostly rejected by the slacker rock scene. Weezer has sold 10 million albums in the United States and over 35 million worldwide. Stephen Thomas Erlewine called them "one of the most popular groups to emerge in the post-grunge alternative rock aftermath".

=== 2000s–2020s: Revival ===
In the 2000s, the indie music scene experienced a resurgence in analog technology and retro aesthetics brought upon by the popularity of genres like chillwave and hypnagogic pop, which brought about a re-interest in cassette culture and early lo-fi and slacker rock bands. In the 2010s, slacker rock experienced a revival spearheaded by artists like Mac DeMarco, Alex G and Car Seat Headrest, as well as artists like Kurt Vile, Vivian Girls, Courtney Barnett, and Ovlov. Subsequently, slacker rock's resurgence would later influence the bedroom pop movement.
