= Slant 6 =

American punk rock band

- Origin: Washington, D.C., U.S.
- Genres: Punk rock
- Years active: 1992–1995
- Labels: Dischord
- Spinoffs: Quix*o*tic; The Casual Dots
- Spinoff of: Autoclave
- Past members: Christina Billotte; Myra Power; Marge Marshall

Slant 6 was an American punk rock trio based in Washington, D.C. affiliated with early riot grrrl.

== History ==
Slant 6 consisted of Christina Billotte (electric guitar and vocals), Myra Power (electric bass guitar and vocals), and Marge Marshall (drum set and trumpet). The group formed in July 1992 following the 1991 breakup of Autoclave, in which Billotte had played. The group took their name from an in-line six-cylinder engine produced in the 1960s through the 1980s by the Chrysler Corporation.

Slant 6's first release was a three song 7" for the Dischord label. They toured the United States several times, and England once. The group released two albums, 1994's Soda Pop * Rip Off and 1995's Inzombia. Evelyn McDonnell and Elisabeth Vincentelli, writing for the New York Times in 2019, considered Soda Pop * Rip Off "arguably the best album of the riot grrrl era." Rob Sheffield, writing for Rolling Stone in 2020, considered Soda Pop * Rip Off an essential LP of the nineties.

The band made an appearance in the 1994 cult road movie Half-cocked. Slant 6 broke up in November 1995 while on tour in England.

== Discography ==
=== Albums and EPs ===
- 1993 - What Kind of Monster Are You EP (Dischord Records)
- 1994 - Soda Pop * Rip Off (Dischord)
- 1995 - Inzombia (Dischord)

=== Singles ===
- 1995 - "We're Having A Baby/ This Is... Young Vulgarians" split single with The Make-Up (Time Bomb Records)

=== Compilation appearances ===
- 1993 - "Alien Movie Stars" on Julep, Yoyo Recordings
- 1993 - "Nights X 9" on Stars Kill Rock, Kill Rock Stars
- 1995 - "Time Expired" on Half-Cocked OST, Matador Records
- 2002 - "What Kind of Monster Are You?" and "Are You Human?" on 20 Years of Dischord, Dischord Records
