= Beat Happening =

American indie pop band

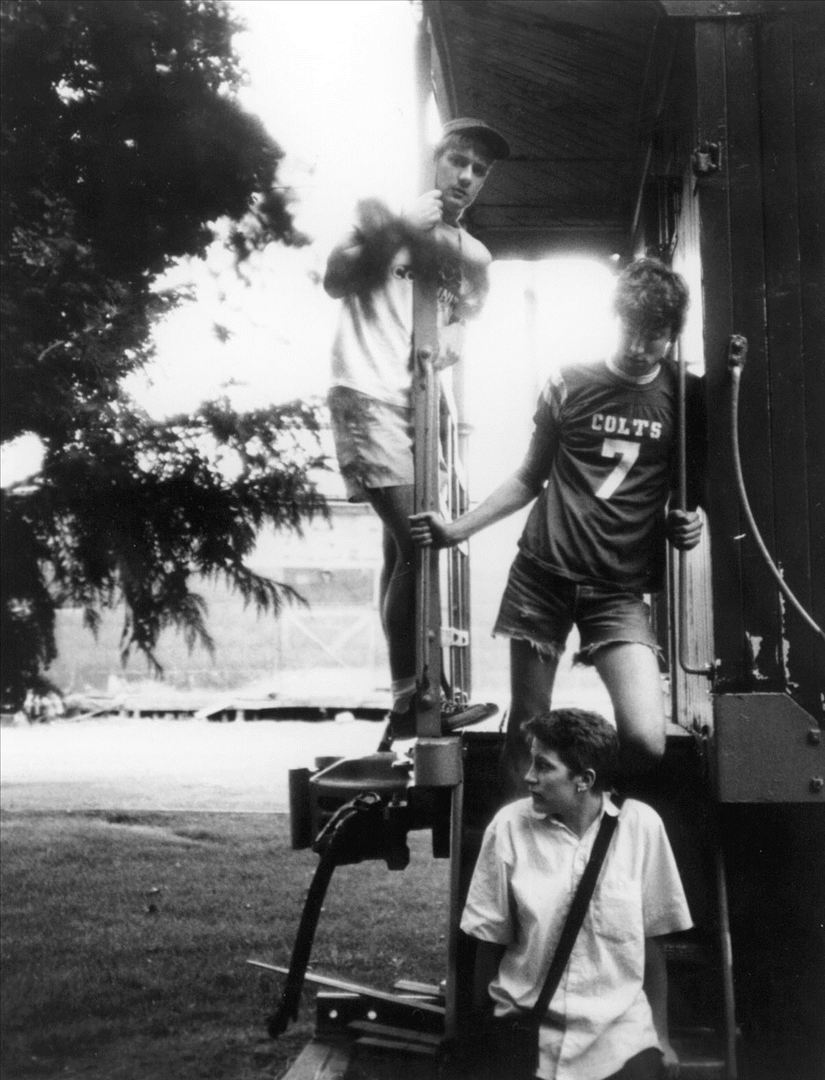
- Beat Happening in 1988. Clockwise from top: Calvin Johnson, Bret Lunsford, Heather Lewis.

Background information
- Origin: Olympia, Washington, U.S.
- Genres: Indie pop; lo-fi; slacker rock; twee pop; noise pop; neo-psychedelia
- Years active: 1982–1992
- Labels: K; Sub Pop; Domino
- Spinoffs: The Halo Benders
- Past members: Calvin Johnson; Heather Lewis; Bret Lunsford

Beat Happening was an American indie pop band formed in Olympia, Washington in 1982. Calvin Johnson, Heather Lewis, and Bret Lunsford were the band's continual members. Beat Happening were early leaders in the American indie pop and slacker rock movements as well as pioneers of twee pop, noted for their playful disregard for the technical aspects of musicianship that contributed to lo-fi music, and songwriting with carefree and coy themes.

== History ==
=== Formation ===
Beat Happening met while attending the Evergreen State College and began recording in 1983. The band took its name from a student art film, Beatnik Happening, made by Lunsford's girlfriend. The year prior, Johnson had founded the label K Records. The band's basic line-up was drums, guitar, and vocals, though when they formed, their only instruments were a pair of maracas and a Sears Silvertone guitar purchased at a thrift shop. Lewis once joked in an interview that she believed the history of the band could be readily told through a list of people whose drums they had borrowed. She and Johnson had been members of a previous band and approached Lunsford, who had no musical experience at the time.

Early recordings made use of an Echoplex machine to add heavy reverb to Lunsford's guitar, in an attempt to mask his unkempt performance.

The band traveled to Tokyo in 1984 with intentions of touring. Their first show in Japan was at the high school of a former exchange student Calvin knew. The band members recorded Three Tea Breakfast, a five-song EP that marked the band's first release.

=== Studio albums ===
Beat Happening (1985), their full-length debut, was critically acclaimed. This acclaim also followed with Jamboree (1988), which became their most iconic record. By the release of Dreamy in 1991, Beat Happening was one of the most popular bands in the indie rock community, leading to their pivotal role in the International Pop Underground Convention, which brought anti-corporate rock its earliest mainstream acceptance. Their last full-length album was 1992's You Turn Me On, which showed the band breaking many of their established conventions from earlier albums to further explore the influence of the Velvet Underground; this was most audible on repetitive post-rock-tinged songs such as "Tiger Trap" and "Godsend", the latter of which runs 9 minutes. The album was described by AllMusic as a "masterpiece." Though never announcing a break-up and claiming at one point to still practice once a month, the members of Beat Happening have moved on to various other projects. Johnson in particular pursued fleshing out the roster of his label K Records, in addition to producing music in several projects, including Dub Narcotic Sound System which Johnson formed to experiment with the recording studio as an instrument.

In 2000, the band released the "Angel Gone" single, which had been their first new release in eight years. This was followed in 2002 by Crashing Through, which collects all of the band's officially released music except for two of their tracks from a live cassette split with The Vaselines. The box set included a booklet containing a lengthy essay on the history and impact of the band by Lois Maffeo, as well as rare photos of Calvin, Heather, and Bret.

In September 2015, the band announced the release of a new compilation spanning their entire career entitled Look Around, which was released by Domino Records on 20 November 2015.

With the full cooperation of the band and the K label, Domino released a vinyl box set of the entire Beat Happening discography, We Are Beat Happening, in November 2019.

=== Legacy ===
Beat Happening's live performances stood out for Calvin's dancing moves (pogo, hula, and shimmy), which he had seen on news reports about UK punks. His onstage behavior did not ingratiate the band to hardcore audiences when they toured with Fugazi in the late 1980s, and audiences were openly hostile, even throwing debris like ashtrays at the band. Nonetheless, rock critic Michael Azzerrad suggests that Beat Happening "was a major force in widening the idea of a punk rocker from a mohawked guy in a motorcycle jacket to a nerdy girl in a cardigan." The presence of Heather Lewis on drums and Calvin's non-threatening stage presence presented a wider variety of behaviors and identities than other acts in the hardcore scene of the time, which was predominantly male and focused on aggression or hyper-masculinity. Beat Happening has been cited as an influence on early riot grrl acts such as Bratmobile and Kathi Wilcox of Bikini Kill.

Kurt Cobain had the K Records logo tattooed on his forearm, saying it was to "try and remind me to stay a child." The song "Lounge Act" on Nevermind references his logo tattoo in the line "I'll arrest myself and wear a shield." Cobain also played guitar on a K Records release, "Bikini Twilight," with Johnson, released as The Go Team.

Calvin Johnson was one of the founders of indie-rock label K Records, and contemporarily comprised one-half of the indie pop band The Go Team along with Tobi Vail; they had an approach and aesthetic similar to that of Beat Happening.

== Members ==
- Calvin Johnson – guitar and vocals
- Heather Lewis – drums, guitar, and vocals
- Bret Lunsford – guitar and drums

== Discography ==
Albums

- 1985 – Beat Happening (K Records)
- 1988 – Jamboree (K Records/Rough Trade)
- 1989 – Black Candy (K Records/Rough Trade)
- 1991 – Dreamy (K Records/Sub Pop)
- 1992 – You Turn Me On (K Records/Sub Pop)

EPs

- 1984 – Beat Happening (K Records)
- 1984 – Three Tea Breakfast (K Records)
- 1988 – Crashing Through (53rd & 3rd)
- 1988 – Beat Happening/Screaming Trees (K Records/Homestead)

Compilations

- 2002 – Crashing Through (K Records) box set
- 2003 – Music to Climb the Apple Tree By (K Records)
- 2015 – Look Around (K/Domino)
- 2018 – We Are Beat Happening (Domino)

Singles

- 1984 – "Our Secret" / "What's Important" (K Records)
- 1987 – "Look Around" / "That Girl" (K Records)
- 1988 – "Honey Pot" / "Don't Mix The Colors" (53rd & 3rd) [flexi-disc]
- 1990 – "Red Head Walking" / "Secret Picnic Spot" (Sub Pop)
- 1990 – "Nancy Sin" / "Dreamy" (K Records)
- 1991 – "Sea Hunt" / "Knock On Any Door" (Bi-Joopiter)
- 2000 – "Angel Gone" / "Zombie Limbo Time" (K Records)
- 2001 – "Crashing Through" / "The This Many Boyfriends Club" (K Records)
