= Inzombia (album) =

Studio album by Slant 6
- Released: May 15, 1995
- Genre: Punk rock
- Length: 29:26
- Label: Dischord

Slant 6 chronology
Soda Pop * Rip Off (1994)	Inzombia (1995)

Inzombia is the second and final album by American punk rock band Slant 6. It was released in 1995 by Dischord.

Inzombia is also the name of a short movie filmed by the band.

== Critical reception ==
Professional ratings
Review scores
Source	Rating
AllMusic	3/5 stars
Robert Christgau	(dud)
The Encyclopedia of Popular Music	3/5 stars

Trouser Press called the album "a major disappointment," writing that "the tedious title track, which takes up a third of the short album, is an extended chunk of quasi-sci-fi film filler that feebly attempts to create horrific atmospheres through poorly executed pin-drop drama." The Washington Post wrote that "the album does seem a little sillier than its predecessor; though as catchy and spry as the band's earlier material, such songs as 'Retro Duck' trade rage for playfulness." CMJ New Music Monthly called Inzombia "highly recommended" and "short, sharp, smart and fun."

== Track listing ==
1. "G.F.S." – 1:52
2. "Baby Doll" – 2:33
3. "Click Click" – 2:09
4. "Instrumental" – 1:27
5. "Ladybug Superfly" – 2:25
6. "Retro Duck" – 1:30
7. "Partner in Crime" – 2:12
8. "Victim of Your Own Desires" – 1:40
9. "Eight Swimming Pools" – 1:57
10. "Insider Spider" – 2:03
11. "Mascaria" – 2:23
12. "Inzombia" – 7:15

== Album credits ==
- Don Zientara, Engineer
- Slant 6, Producer, Main Performer
- Ian MacKaye, Producer
- Alec MacKaye
- Charles Steck, Photography
- Christina Billotte, Guitar, Director, Drums, Vocals
- Myra Power, Bass, Guitar, Vocals
- Aaron Jones
- Marge Marshall, Organ, Piano, Drums, Vocals (Background), Vocals
- Ee-an Sve-non-ee-us, Director
