= Christina Billotte =

American drummer

- Born: May 4, 1969 (age 56); Washington D.C., U.S.
- Genres: Punk music
- Occupation: Singer-songwriter
- Instrument: Guitar

Christina Billotte is an American singer, songwriter, and guitarist, known for her involvement in the punk music scene in Washington, D.C., as a performer and organizer. She is included in Venus Zine's list "The Greatest Female Guitarists of All Time".

== Musical career ==
Billotte and Melissa Berkoff initially began playing together in a Washington, DC band called Hazmat in 1989, but then joined up with Nikki Chapman and Mary Timony to form Autoclave in 1991. Autoclave became known for their math rock styling and released a single on the Diskord label - a joint effort between Dischord and K Records - before splitting up in 1991.

In early 1991, Billotte and Washington, DC artist Jen Smith joined Pacific Northwest band Bratmobile (Allison Wolfe and Molly Neuman) when they temporarily relocated to Washington, DC. Wolfe and Neuman created the fanzine Girl Germs. Though never formally a member of Bratmobile, Billotte played an occasional live show, and guitar on the cassette tape entitled Bratmobile DC. The Bratmobile girls were zine writers. It was during this time in Washington, DC that Jen Smith came up with the idea of a "girl riot" and Molly Neuman conceived the riot grrrl mini-zine that gave the movement its name. Erin Smith then joined Bratmobile on guitar, replacing Billotte. By end of summer 1991, Wolfe and Neuman returned to Olympia, Washington, with Erin Smith remaining in DC.

In June 1992, Billotte formed the all-female punk trio Slant 6 which released two albums on Dischord Records. The band toured widely, before breaking up in 1995 whilst on tour in England.

In 1997 Dischord released an Autoclave compilation titled Combined.

The same year Billotte formed Quix*o*tic, along with her sister Mira on drums and Brendan Majewski on bass. The band released an album Night for Day on their own Ixor Stix label. Majewski was replaced by Mick Barr and the band released a second album, Mortal Mirror, on Kill Rock Stars in 2001. The band broke up in 2002 with Mira moving to NYC to form White Magic.

In 2002 Billotte joined the Casual Dots with Kathi Wilcox (Bikini Kill, the Julie Ruin and the Frumpies), and Steve Dore. The band released a self-titled LP through Kill Rock Stars in 2004 and a second LP in 2022 entitled Sanguine Truth.

== Artistic career ==
Billotte moved to Los Angeles, CA in 2003, and received a BFA in Ceramics from California State University, Long Beach. She received an MFA from the Mount Royal Interdisciplinary program at Maryland Institute College of Art in Baltimore, Maryland in 2013.
