= Billy Karren =

American musician

- Also known as: Billy Boredom
- Born: William Francis Karren
- Genres: Punk; riot grrrl
- Occupation: Musician
- Instrument: Guitar
- Years active: 1985–present
- Label: Bikini Kill

William Francis Karren is an American musician, best known as the lead guitarist of the punk/riot grrrl band Bikini Kill, formed by Kathleen Hanna, with Karren, Tobi Vail and Kathi Wilcox. He was also active in many other music projects, including the Go Team, the Frumpies, Corrections, and Spray Painted Love (with Tobi Vail). He did not participate in Bikini Kill's 2019 reunion; his replacement was Erica Dawn Lyle.

In a Bikini Kill interview, Karren gave his influences as The Slits, The Ronettes, Chrissie Hynde, and Wire.
