= Quix*o*tic =

Quix*o*tic was a rock band active from 1997 to 2002 in the area of Washington, D.C., United States. They were known for their blend of R&B and doo wop with a Gothic outlook.

== History ==
Quix*o*tic formed in 1997. The original line-up was guitarist/vocalist Christina Billotte, known for her work with bands like Slant 6 and The Casual Dots, drummer/vocalist Mira Billotte, and bassist/vocalist Brendan Majewski. Majewski left in 2001 and was replaced by Mick Barr. The band broke up in 2003 with Mira moving to NYC to form White Magic.

The band was well received and opened for Fugazi at their last U.S. show to date on July 1, 2002, at Fort Reno Park in Washington, D.C. The group also toured with Papa M, Will Oldham, and extensively with Sonic Youth.

The band played the Sonic Youth-curated All Tomorrow's Parties Festival in Los Angeles in March 2002.

A single, Heliotrope, was released on their own Ixor Stix label in 1998. This was followed by their album Night for Day (also on Ixor Stix), which featured a cover of The Miracles 1962 song "What's So Good About Goodbye." The second album, Mortal Mirror, was released on the Kill Rock Stars label in 2002 with covers of Aaron Neville's "Tell It Like It Is", Billy Stewart's "Sitting in the Park", and Black Sabbath's "Lord of This World".

Quix*o*tic should not be confused with Quixotic - an unrelated electronica band formed in NYC in 2005.

Bassist Brendan Majewski committed suicide in 2011.

== Discography ==
- Night For Day (1999, Ixor Stix)
- Mortal Mirror (2002, Kill Rock Stars)
