= The Frumpies =

American lo-fi punk rock band (1992–2000)

- Origin: Olympia, Washington
- Genres: Punk rock, garage rock, riot grrrl, lo-fi
- Years active: 1992–2000
- Labels: Kill Rock Stars; Lookout!; Chainsaw; Wiiija
- Spinoff of: Bikini Kill; Bratmobile
- Past members: Billy Karren; Molly Neuman; Tobi Vail; Kathi Wilcox; Michelle Mae

The Frumpies were an American riot grrrl punk rock band formed in 1992 in Olympia, Washington. The original lineup consisted of singers/guitarists Tobi Vail, Kathi Wilcox, and Billy Karren (all of whom were also a part of the riot grrrl band Bikini Kill), and Bratmobile drummer Molly Neuman. Their debut was the 7-inch single Alien Summer Nights on the Chainsaw Records label. Babies and Bunnies was recorded in 1993, with future Make-Up and Weird War bassist Michelle Mae signing on long enough to record "Tommy Slich." Their music has been described as lo-fi garage rock in the riot grrl and punk style.

After a two-year hiatus, the Frumpies reunited in 1996, releasing the EP Eunuch Nights. The CD collection Frumpie One Piece assembled all of the band's previous singles. The group's last release was the 2000 EP "Frumpies Forever."

== Discography ==
- Alien Summer Nights (7-inch EP) CHSW 6, released 1993.
- Babies & Bunnies (7-inch EP) KRS213, released 1993-08.
- Tommy Slich (7-inch, EP) Lookout 091, released 1993.
- Safety First (7-inch, EP) WIJ31V, released 1994.
- Eunuch Nights (7-inch EP) KRS322, released: 1998-09-23.
- Frumpie One-Piece (CD) KRS335, released: 1998-10-23.
- Frumpies Forever (7-inch EP) KRS366, released: 2000-08-01.
