= Tobi Vail =

American musician (born 1969)

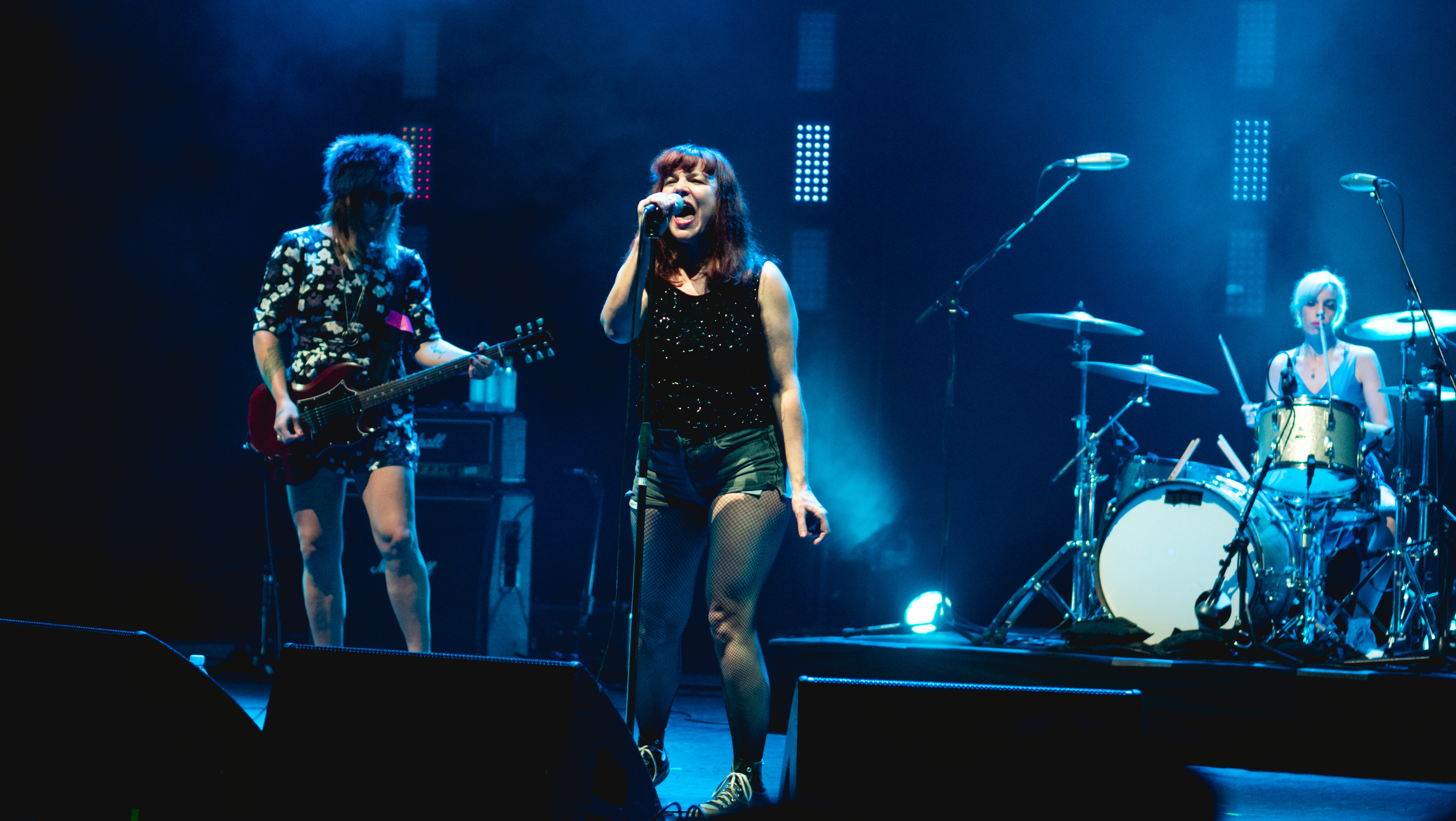
- Vail performing with Bikini Kill in 2020

Background information
- Born: Tobi Celeste Vail; July 20, 1969 (age 57); Auburn, Washington, U.S.
- Genres: Riot grrrl, grunge, punk rock, indie rock
- Occupations: Musician, writer
- Instruments: Drums, guitar, vocals
- Years active: 1984–present
- Labels: K, Kill Rock Stars, Bumpidee, Chainsaw, Lookout!, Wiiija, Yoyo Records, Simple Machines, Catcall, Ebullition, Outpunk, Chicks on Speed
- Member of: Bikini Kill, Spider and the Webs, gSp
- Formerly of: The Go Team, Some Velvet Sidewalk, the Frumpies, the Old Haunts

Tobi Celeste Vail (born July 20, 1969) is an American musician and writer from Olympia, Washington. She was a central figure in the riot grrrl scene—she coined the spelling of "grrrl"—and she started the zine Jigsaw. A drummer, guitarist and singer, she was a founding member of the band Bikini Kill. Vail has collaborated in several other bands figuring in the Olympia music scene. Vail writes for eMusic.

== Early life ==
Tobi Celeste Vail was born in Auburn, Washington, to teenage parents. Both her grandfather and her father were drummers. When she was young her parents moved the family to rural Naselle, Washington, where her father worked in a youth detention center. The family moved to Olympia, Washington, where Vail attended high school. The first concert she went to on her own was a Wipers show in 1984. In 1988, Vail left Washington to live in Eugene, Oregon. After a year, she returned to Olympia.

While still in high school, Vail volunteered at KAOS (FM), the campus radio station at The Evergreen State College. At KAOS, Vail was exposed to a wide variety of independent music. She served off and on as a disc jockey from age 15 to 21.

== Music career ==
=== Early bands ===
One of Vail's first bands was the Go Team, a punk project started with Calvin Johnson in 1985. The group released several cassettes and nine singles on the independent label K Records, mostly on the 7" vinyl format. Billy "Billy Boredom" Karren was one of the rotating musicians who played with the Go Team, and it was in this band that he and Vail played together for the first time. The band toured the West Coast in 1987 as a two-piece, then added Karren for two U.S. tours, both in 1989. After the Go Team disbanded, Vail played in various project bands and made a record as the drummer for Some Velvet Sidewalk; she toured with Some Velvet Sidewalk during early 1990. Since the beginning of her teens, Vail had tried to form an all-female band to "rule the world and change how people view music and politics", including a group named Doris.

=== Bikini Kill ===
In October 1990, Vail and Evergreen State College classmates Kathi Wilcox and Kathleen Hanna determined to form a band, which they named Bikini Kill. Vail played drums and on some songs she sang. Through early 1991, Hanna and Wilcox swapped bass player and lead singer duties halfway through the set, and Wilcox also played guitar. After trying out a lot of female lead guitar players, none of whom seemed to fit, the band finally asked Karren to join as he was already known to Vail and a familiar figure in the Olympia music scene.

Soon after the band formed, they started a zine called Bikini Kill to promote the band and describe the band's social and political views. Hanna, Vail and Wilcox contributed articles to the zine. In Bikini Kill #1, Vail commented on the punk music scene and its overemphasis on males. She wrote about the "Yoko factor": the time when a male musician tells his girlfriend that she should not break up the band (comparing Yoko Ono's influence on the breakup of the Beatles) and that the girlfriend would never be as important to him as his band. Through the Bikini Kill zine and publicity for the band, Vail voiced her belief that the world would change for the better if the number of girls joining bands increased until it was equal to the number of boys.

Bikini Kill performed at the International Pop Underground Convention in August 1991, and Vail and Hanna each performed separately on "Girl Night".

Despite frequent mainstream media misrepresentation and serious violence at shows, they continued for several years and today are largely credited (along with Bratmobile) with starting riot grrrl, a movement that merged do it yourself (DIY) punk culture with feminism. The band Bikini Kill tried to reclaim feminism for the punk scene in an attempt to disrupt its male bias. The band fought against male aggression at their shows. Largely because of Hanna's leadership, Bikini Kill encouraged girls to stand at the front of the stage for solidarity as well as for protection from male aggression. Vail and the other members of Bikini Kill encouraged girls to start their own bands. The general idea that girls should create their own independent culture grew rapidly in popularity through a largely underground network of similar-feeling fans, artists, musicians and writers, and soon regular meetings started taking place, usually in punk houses like Positive Force. By the summer of 1991, the riot grrrl movement had coalesced, with Bikini Kill moving to Washington, D.C., for a year.

In February 2016, Vail issued a YouTube takedown request after a pro-Hillary Clinton video utilizing the Bikini Kill song "Rebel Girl" began to go viral.

=== The Frumpies ===
In 1992, while still involved with Bikini Kill, Tobi started the Frumpies in Washington, D.C., with Bikini Kill bandmates Wilcox and Karren, and also with Molly Neuman of Bratmobile and the PeeChees, and later Michelle Mae. The Frumpies were distinctly less overtly political in nature than either Bikini Kill or Bratmobile, with a different sound. The band toured the U.S. with Huggy Bear in 1993 and they toured Italy with noise rock band Dada Swing in 2000.

In 1993, Vail started Bumpidee, a low-cost method for unsigned bands to increase their listener base, using the distribution of cassette recordings of their songs. This was another embodiment of Vail's strong DIY principle. The name Bumpidee was chosen in honor of the children's television show Bumpity. One of the Bumpidee bands was Worst Case Scenario which included Justin Trosper and Brandt Sandeno—these two musicians found success in the band Unwound, retaining the DIY ethic from their Bumpidee exposure.

=== Spider and the Webs ===
In mid-2004, Vail founded the band Spider and the Webs, with James Maeda on guitar and Chris Sutton on drums and bass. Vail sings and plays guitar, and she trades drumming roles with Sutton. Spider and the Webs played Ladyfest in 2005 in Olympia, and Vail spoke about the riot grrrl movement at other Ladyfest conferences held in Brighton and Madrid in October 2005, during a Spider and the Webs European tour. The band produced an EP in October 2006 on K Records: Frozen Roses, following a split EP with Partyline on Bristol, UK's Local Kid records. A (cassette) album was eventually released in 2015, also available as a download.

=== gSp ===
Vail then formed "supergroup" girlSperm—also styled as gSp—with Layla Gibbon and Marissa Magic. gSp released their first album in 2017, receiving praise from Pitchfork, Rolling Stone and the New York Times.

=== Other projects ===
Vail ran the mail order department at Kill Rock Stars from 1998 to 2011, after working there part-time from 1992 to 1997. In addition to blogging through her Jigsaw website, Vail also posts as "Tabitha Says" on Tumblr, beginning in August 2008.

With her sister Maggie, Vail joined Allison Wolfe, Cat Power, and members of Sleater-Kinney to organize the first Ladyfest in 2000, a music, activism, and arts conference held in Olympia. The Vail sisters played the festival in a band named Frenchie and the German Girls. In keeping with Vail's DIY ethic, the Ladyfest founders turned the Ladyfest brand over to the public domain so that others could freely organize similar festivals.

From 2006 to 2008, Vail drummed with the Old Haunts, including on their final album, Poisonous Times. Vail has performed several solo shows, including one in Barcelona at Primera Persona in March 2012.

== Writing ==
In 1989, Vail published the first issue of her feminist zine Jigsaw. When she published the zine, Vail was working at an Olympia sandwich shop with Kathi Wilcox who remembers being impressed by Vail's focus on "girls in bands, specifically," including an aggressive emphasis on feminist issues. While Kathleen Hanna was touring with Viva Knievel, she came upon a copy of Jigsaw #2, finding resonance in Vail's "Boxes", a five-page article about gender. Hanna wrote to Vail and submitted musician interviews to be published in Jigsaw while Hanna was on tour; this was the beginning of their collaboration. In Jigsaw, Vail wrote about "angry grrls", combining the word girls with the powerful growl of grr. Vail's third issue, published in 1991 after she spent time in Washington D.C., was subtitled "angry grrrl zine". Vail soon became dismayed with the male-slanted media coverage of the riot grrrl scene. Janice Radway notes that her copy of Jigsaw #4, also published in 1991, has many instances of the printed word "grrrl", but each one has been crossed out, "presumably by Vail, as a protest against the popularity of the term."

The final issue of the printed version of Jigsaw was published in 1999. In 2001, Vail began an online blog named Bumpidee. Vail used the Bumpidee site to publish Jigsaw #8 in the spring and summer of 2003, including writings by Alan Licht and Becca Albee. She moved the Jigsaw blog to its own domain in September 2008. In mid-2013, Jigsaw issues from the 1990s were archived at Harvard University as a research resource along with 20,000 other countercultural zines.

Vail started working as a freelance writer after graduating from the Evergreen State College in 2009. Her work has been published by NPR, Artforum, The Believer, Punk Planet and Maximum Rock-N-Roll. She currently writes a monthly column for eMusic and was recently published by The Feminist Press in the anthologies Pussy Riot: A Punk Prayer for Freedom and The Riot Grrrl Collection. Hanna commented upon Vail's song "Free Pussy Riot", written in support of the Russian feminist punk band Pussy Riot after three members were arrested in March 2012. The Punk Singer, a 2013 documentary about Hanna, includes footage from three archival interviews with Vail. The film also includes archival footage of several Bikini Kill performances.

== Personal life ==
Vail met Kurt Cobain when she was hanging around with Melvins in 1986. Cobain played guitar on one of the Go Team songs. In early 1990, while Cobain was still dating Tracy Marander, Cobain began spending a great deal of time with Vail, including overnights. Confronted by Marander, Cobain admitted to sleeping with Vail after repeated denials. This led to Cobain and Marander breaking up and Marander moving out. Vail and Cobain briefly dated beginning in July 1990. The two discussed the possibility of starting a music project, and recorded a few songs together. Some of these songs ended up being Nirvana tracks. Referring to the Teen Spirit deodorant brand that Vail once used, Kathleen Hanna wrote "Kurt smells like Teen Spirit" with a sharpie on the wall of Cobain's bedroom. Cobain, unaware of the deodorant brand, saw a deeper meaning in the phrase, and wrote the song "Smells Like Teen Spirit". Cobain and Vail soon split but remained friends.

Vail's relationship with Tim Armstrong inspired him to write the Rancid song "Olympia, WA" from the album ...And Out Come the Wolves.
