= Elisabeth Vincentelli =

American journalist

- Born: France
- Occupations: Writer, critic, journalist
- Writing career
- Genre: Journalism

Elisabeth Vincentelli is a French-born, American arts and culture journalist. She is a regular contributor to The New York Times’ Arts section. She served as the chief drama critic for the New York Post from 2009 until 2016, having replaced Clive Barnes after his death in 2008.

== Biography ==
Vincentelli was born in France, grew up in Corsica, and came to the United States in the late 1980s. She writes a blog called The Determined Dilettante. Previous to writing for the Post she joined Time Out New York in 2000, and later became the 'Arts & Entertainment Editor' there. Vincentelli has written for The New Yorker, The New York Times, Newsday, and The Village Voice, and is a member of the New York Drama Critics' Circle.

Vincentelli is the author of Abba Gold (2004) about the pop group ABBA and Abba Treasures.

She co-hosted the podcast Three on the Aisle with fellow critics Terry Teachout of the Wall Street Journal and Peter Marks, then of The Washington Post, for American Theatre Magazine, which ran from 2017 until January 2021. After Teachout's death in early 2022, she started a new podcast with Marks called Marks & Vincentelli.

As of 2022, she resided in the Park Slope neighborhood of Brooklyn.
