= You Turn Me On =

Studio album by Beat Happening
- Released: 1992
- Recorded: 1992
- Genre: Dream pop; pop; punk
- Length: 45:29
- Label: K/Sub Pop
- Producer: Stuart Moxham/Steve Fisk

Beat Happening chronology
Dreamy (1991)	You Turn Me On (1992)	Crashing Through (2002)

You Turn Me On is the fifth and final studio album by the American band Beat Happening, released in 1992. The band supported the album with a North American tour.

== Background and production ==
Beat Happening released their fifth studio album Dreamy in 1991; as their popularity rose, the members seemed less interested in the band. Following this, their own label, K Records, was thriving; frontman Calvin Johnson became an important figure in the International Pop Underground Festival, held for the first time in their hometown of Olympia, Washington. In addition, Johnson formed the Halo Benders, with their producer Steve Fisk, and Dub Narcotic Sound System. Beat Happening issued the "Seahunt" single in 1991 prior to their next album.

You Turn Me On was produced by Stuart Moxham of Young Marble Giants and Fisk. As with every Beat Happening album, it was Calvin Johnson's goal to write the perfect pop song. The band employed multitrack recording and extended many of the songs.

== Critical reception ==
Professional ratings
Review scores
Source	Rating
AllMusic	4.5/5 stars
Alternative Rock	7/10
Pitchfork	8.0/10

Rolling Stone wrote that, "as with any truly good rock band, it's vision—not mere chops—that drives their engine... The group's songs combine the spooky-sparse quality of early rockabilly with the naive sound of Sixties teen-beat pop." The Washington Post stated that the "do-it-yourself tunes combine the irresistible hummability of bubblegum with the stripped-down dirges of punk."

AllMusic deemed the album "a mature record of tremendous breadth and complexity" and "a masterpiece." Author Dave Thompson, in his book Alternative Rock (2000), wrote that it sounded "still determinedly minimalistic, Turn is indeed a turning point, as Beat Happening exhibit a maturity and sound quality never dreamt of in the past."

== Track listing ==
All tracks written by Beat Happening.

1. "Tiger Trap" – 6:53
2. "Noise" – 3:23
3. "Pinebox Derby" – 3:07
4. "Teenage Caveman" – 4:35
5. "Sleepy Head" – 4:07
6. "You Turn Me On" – 4:10
7. "Godsend" – 9:28
8. "Hey Day" – 3:25
9. "Bury the Hammer" – 6:04
