= Black Candy =

Studio album by Beat Happening
- Released: 1989
- Recorded: 1988
- Genre: Twee pop; noise pop
- Length: 30:03
- Label: K
- Producer: Steve Fisk

Beat Happening chronology
Jamboree (1988)	Black Candy (1989)	Dreamy (1991)

Black Candy is the third studio album by indie pop band Beat Happening.

== Release and reception ==
Professional ratings
Review scores
Source	Rating
AllMusic	4/5 stars
Alternative Rock	4/10
Hi-Fi News & Record Review	B:1

Beat Happening promoted it with tours alongside Fugazi in 1990 and 1991.

Author Dave Thompson, in his book Alternative Rock (2000), wrote that despite the titular song "kick[ing] critical ass," the remainder of the album "sounds like BH didn't actually know they were making it. Or that someone was taping the rehearsal." The name of the song "T.V. Girl" was the inspiration for indie pop group TV Girl's name.

== Track listing ==
All tracks written by Beat Happening.

1. "Other Side" – 3:35
2. "Black Candy" – 3:00
3. "Knick Knack" – 2:13
4. "Pajama Party in a Haunted Hive" – 4:38
5. "Gravedigger Blues" – 2:26
6. "Cast a Shadow" – 2:31
7. "Bonfire" – 3:12
8. "T.V. Girl" – 2:31
9. "Playhouse" – 2:30
10. "Ponytail" – 3:27

== Cover versions ==
Beat Happening's songs from Black Candy have been covered by other artists:

- Kim Gordon and Thurston Moore of Sonic Youth recorded a version of the album's title track with Epic Soundtracks, featuring vocals by Kim.
- Cub and Yo La Tengo have rendered their own versions of "Cast a Shadow".
