= Calvin Johnson (musician) =

American musician (born 1962)

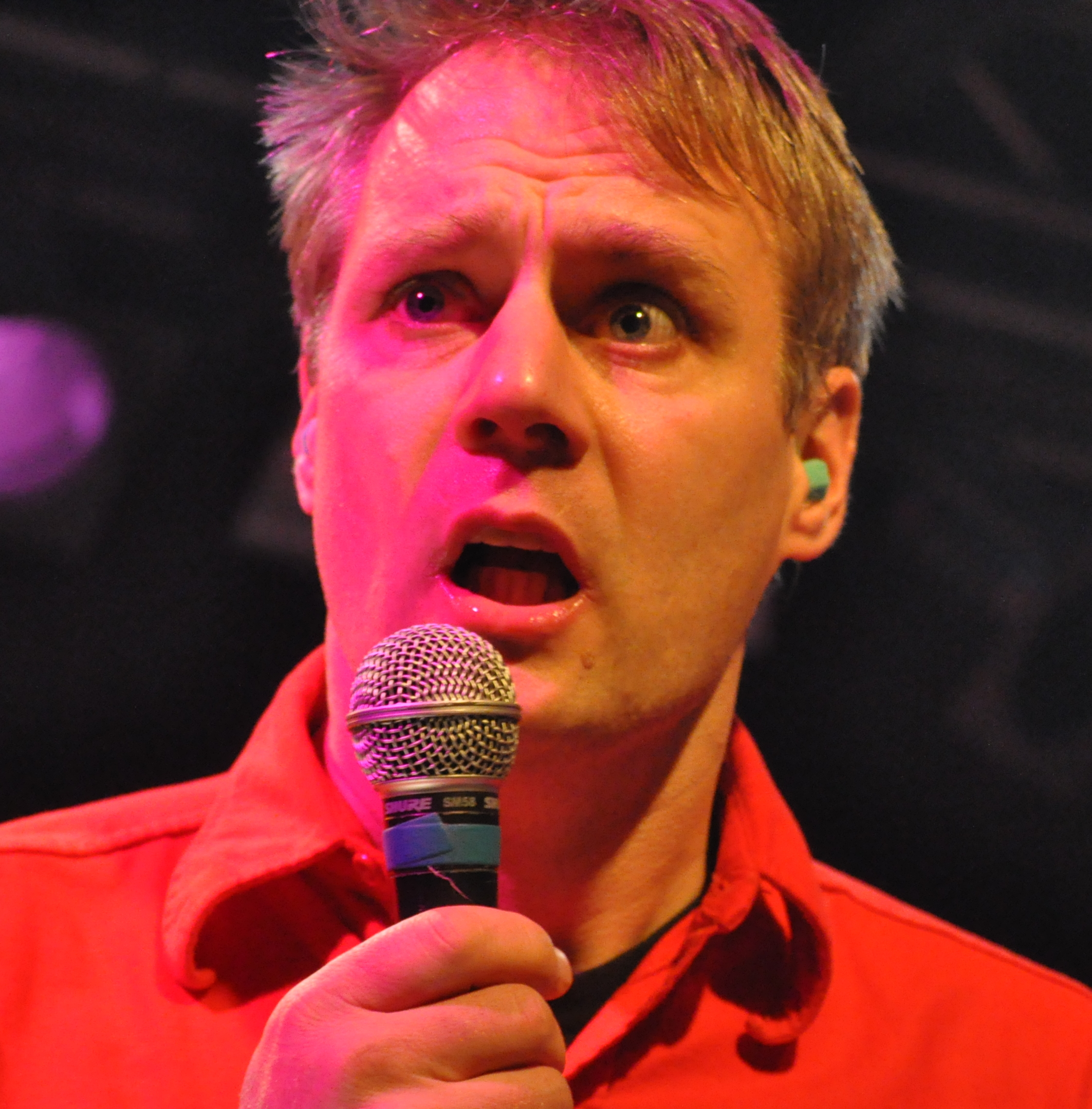
- Johnson in 2011

Background information
- Also known as: Selector Dub Narcotic
- Born: November 1, 1962 (age 64); Olympia, Washington, U.S.
- Genres: Punk rock, lo-fi, indie rock, electro
- Occupations: Musician, songwriter, DJ, record producer, label head
- Instruments: Guitar, vocals
- Label: K Records

Calvin Johnson (born November 1, 1962) is an American guitarist, vocalist, songwriter, music producer, and disc jockey. Johnson is a founding member of Cool Rays, Beat Happening, Dub Narcotic Sound System, The Go Team, and The Halo Benders.

Additionally, Johnson is the founder and owner of indie record label K Records, and has been cited as a major player in the beginning of the modern independent music movement.

== Early life and education ==
Johnson was born in Olympia, Washington. His first introduction to underground culture was in 1977 when he became a volunteer at Olympia's community radio station, KAOS-FM, at the age of fifteen. The station's uniquely progressive programming policy mandated a focus on music available through independent and artist owned labels, rather than centralized corporate media. This independent, do-it-yourself ethos has been an important influence on Johnson's career. Johnson soon began writing for fanzines, such as Sub/Pop (later to become Sub Pop Records) and Op, and also organized music and film events. Johnson attended The Evergreen State College in Olympia, where his first band, a short-lived group called Cool Rays, made their debut recordings with Steve Fisk in 1981. Calvin established K in the summer of 1982.

At some point, his father gave him a Martin acoustic guitar. He later told an interviewer that his father had "received it as a wedding present from his bride."

== Career ==
=== Beat Happening ===
Johnson formed Beat Happening in 1982 with fellow Evergreen students Heather Lewis and Bret Lunsford. Beat Happening were early leaders in the American indie rock and lo-fi movements, noted for their use of primitive recording techniques, disregard for the technical aspects of musicianship, and songs with subject matters of a childish or coy nature. Instruments were guitar and drums, with members frequently switching instruments and Calvin and Heather taking turns on lead vocals. Tours with artists such as Fugazi confused and alienated audience members while articulating a punk rock position of defiance that was more sensitive than macho. The band has been on hiatus since 1992, but briefly resurfaced to release a new 7" in 2001.

=== Go Team ===
The Go Team was a collaborative project started in 1985 based around the core duo of Johnson and Tobi Vail, later of Bikini Kill & Kill Rock Stars. They toured the West Coast as a two-piece, adding Billy Karren for two U.S. tours. The group released several cassettes and 9 singles on K, with a rotating cast of collaborators that included Kurt Cobain, Rich Jensen, David Nichols, and Donna Dresch. All of their recordings are currently out of print.

=== Dub Narcotic Sound System ===
Dub Narcotic Sound System, named after Calvin's famed analog recording studio, was a project that explored funkier, more dance-party-oriented material in the tradition of the Stax/Volt house bands. Johnson was the sole member to appear on every recording, surrounded by a loose collective of musicians that's included Larry Butler, Todd Ranslow, and Brian Weber (all members of hip-hop group Dead Presidents). Numerous 7" singles and several full-length albums were released. The revolving door nature of the ensemble led to collaborations with Jon Spencer Blues Explosion, Lois Maffeo and director/writer/performer Miranda July. The lineup later solidified around the trio of Johnson, bassist Chris Sutton (C.O.C.O, Hornet Leg, The Gossip) and drummer Heather Dunn (Tiger Trap). A catastrophic tour van crash in Montana in 2003 nearly ended the band's career in tragedy. Johnson suffered a major concussion that left him with broken ribs and a serious speech impediment; he has since largely recovered. The band has not toured or released recordings since 2004's Degenerate Introduction.

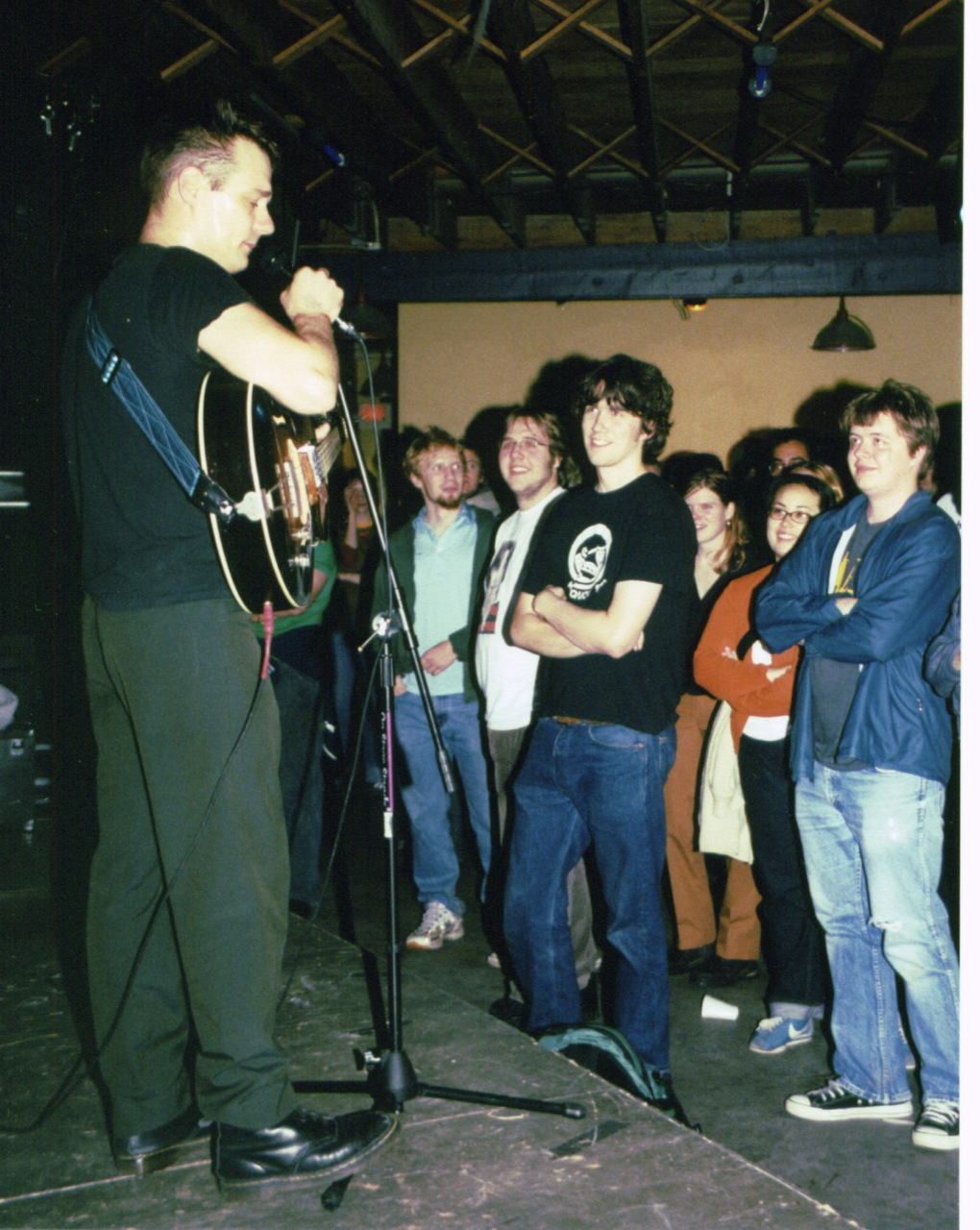
Johnson performing in 2004

=== Halo Benders ===
Halo Benders was a collaboration between Johnson and Doug Martsch of Built To Spill. From 1994 to 1998, they released three albums. Calvin's deep baritone voice and Doug's high melodies are heard simultaneously, occasionally harmonizing, but often operating independently of one another. Despite the Halo Benders' critical and commercial success, Martsch's commitment to touring with Built To Spill prevented the band from touring and recording more. The band reunited for a 2008 performance in Boise, and may be working on new material.

=== Solo career ===
Concurrent with his activity with Dub Narcotic Sound System, Johnson began performing solo shows under his own name. Calvin's solo material was a marked contrast to the upbeat rock of Halo Benders and the funk-soul of DNSS, as it allowed him to explore mournful blues, folk, & gospel elements.

His first solo album, What Was Me, is an introspective album about love, loss, and death. While some songs employ simple nylon-string guitar accompaniment, many feature only Johnson's voice. It also contains duets with Beth Ditto of The Gossip and Mirah.

His second album, Before the Dream Faded..., is more varied. It includes collaborations with a variety of northwest indie luminaries. The songs covers various subjects, such as the size and color of hearts, Lucifer, and falling in love.

His third album Calvin Johnson & The Sons of the Soil is a career-spanning collection of re-recorded songs with a band consisting of Kyle Field, Adam Forkner, and Jason Anderson, documenting that ensemble's 2003 West Coast touring lineup.

His fourth album A Wonderful Beast, is similar to Johnson's long established vocal and poetic style with a more contemporary production value created in part by the records producer Patrick Carney of The Black Keys who also worked as a one-man backing band of guitars, drums, bass, and keyboards.

His fifth album, Gallows Wine, is an eclectic collection of songs reflecting this singular environment including “Pink Cadillac”, written by Johnson when he was 16. The title song ”Gallows Wine” has psychedelic elements. “Crazy Legs” is a song with a style similar to Gene Vincent, and “Orange Aid” melts downtown no WAV. Calvin Johnson traveled to Columbus, Mississippi to record Gallows Wine with the combo Hartle Road at their Pompeii studio. Columbus, in Lowndes County, is the childhood home of Tennessee Williams (just down US Route 45 from White Station, birthplace of Howlin’ Wolf).

=== Current projects ===
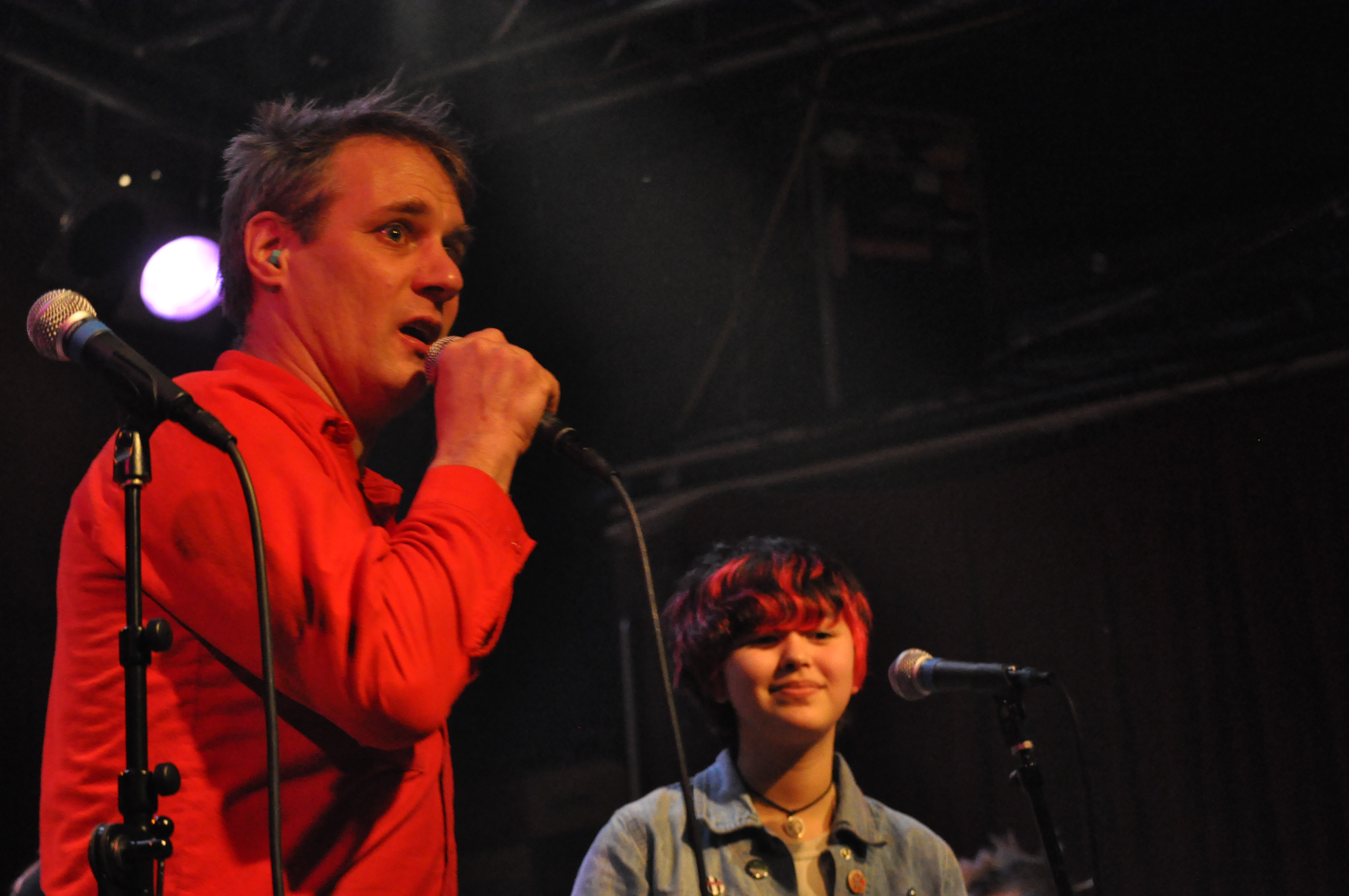
Johnson with younger musicians at a "School of Rock" event in 2011

In 2008, Calvin Johnson appeared in the film The Lollipop Generation by G.B. Jones.

As of 2023, His latest project has been "Gallows Wine" with the Rock band known as Hartle Road.

== Relationship with other musicians ==
After meeting Ian MacKaye in 1980, Johnson later became friends with the members of Fugazi, and Beat Happening was the opening band on one of Fugazi's first tours.

Johnson has worked with Modest Mouse, Beck, Heavenly, The Microphones, Jon Spencer Blues Explosion, The Blow, Jens Lekman, Mecca Normal, The Gossip, Built to Spill, and Fifth Column, among many others. Since founding his Dub Narcotic recording studio in 1993, he has produced and engineered recordings by many bands and artists.

Friends of Kurt Cobain such as Ian Dickson of Earth, Mark Arm of Mudhoney, Bruce Pavitt and Slim Moon have all acknowledged Johnson's significant influence on the musician. Cobain cited Beat Happening's Jamboree as one of his favorite records, and even got the K Records logo (a small "K" in a shield) tattooed on his arm to "try and remind [him] to stay a child." They were friends in the late 80s/early 90s when Cobain lived in Olympia; he'd been a guest with The Go Team, and on September 25, 1990, Cobain appeared on a KAOS (FM) show hosted by Johnson and performed a number of songs, acoustically, including a duet with Johnson on the Wipers song, "D-7." Cobain later grew to resent Johnson's "arrogance" and denounced his ties in a (private) journal entry.

Johnson is also referred to in the John Peel session version of the Hole song, "Olympia" (also credited as "Rock Star" on the album Live Through This). The band's lead singer, Courtney Love has the line: 'I went to school with Calvin,' a reference to Johnson's influence within the burgeoning Olympia indie music scene. In 1993, Johnson had a restraining order placed on Love for harassment and assault.

== Solo discography ==
- What Was Me (2002, K Records)
- Before the Dream Faded... (2005, K Records)
- Calvin Johnson & The Sons of the Soil (2007, K Records)
- This Party Is Just Getting Started (as Selector Dub Narcotic, 2016, K Records)
- A Wonderful Beast (2018)
- Gallows Wine (2023, K Records)
