= Dreamy (Beat Happening album) =

Studio album by Beat Happening
- Released: March 1, 1991
- Recorded: 1990
- Genre: Indie pop
- Length: 30:15
- Label: K/Sub Pop
- Producer: Steve Fisk

Beat Happening chronology
Black Candy (1989)	Dreamy (1991)	You Turn Me On (1992)

Dreamy is the fourth studio album by the indie pop band Beat Happening, released in 1991. The band recorded the tracks in a living room and in a professional recording studio.

== Release and reception ==
Professional ratings
Review scores
Source	Rating
AllMusic	4.5/5 stars
Chicago Tribune	3/4 stars
Entertainment Weekly	A
Pitchfork	8.6/10
St. Petersburg Times	4/5 stars

Accompanied by the "Red Head Walking" and "Nancy Sin" singles, Dreamy was issued in 1991.

The Chicago Tribune wrote: "It's a stripped-of-conventions, anti-pop stance that could sound just as calculated and empty as some elaborate pop productions, but Beat Happening imparts both quirky charm and a sense of immediacy to its material." The St. Petersburg Times deemed "Collide" "one of the eeriest songs to come along in a while... It's eerie in a playful, sickly pretty way."

== Track listing ==
All tracks written by Beat Happening.

1. "Me Untamed" – 3:46
2. "Left Behind" – 2:53
3. "Hot Chocolate Boy" – 2:21
4. "I've Lost You" – 2:48
5. "Cry for a Shadow" – 2:27
6. "Collide" – 3:29
7. "Nancy Sin" – 2:40
8. "Fortune Cookie Prize" – 3:46
9. "Revolution Come and Gone" – 4:16
10. "Red Head Walking" – 2:07
