= Heather Lewis (musician) =

American drummer

- Born: 1962 (age 63–64)
- Origin: New York City
- Genres: Punk; Lo-fi; Indie rock Indie pop
- Occupation: Musician
- Instruments: Drums, vocals
- Label: K Records

Heather Lewis (born 1962) is an American multi-instrumentalist and founding member of Beat Happening. Prior to her work with Beat Happening, Lewis was a member of the Supreme Cool Beings, who are notable for having the first ever release on K Records, 1982's Survival of the Coolest. She appeared as a guest vocalist on several songs from Land of the Loops, as well as the Wedding Present's album Watusi.

== Career ==
=== Early years ===
Lewis grew up in Westchester County, New York, and left to attend Evergreen College in Olympia, Washington, in 1980.

=== Supreme Cool Beings ===
During a summer break at Evergreen in 1982, Lewis was visiting her friend Gary May's apartment. The room had been turned into an impromptu rehearsal space, and after playing with a drum set she was invited to drum for his band. After adding Doug Monaghan, the trio, including drums, sax, and guitar, was named the Supreme Cool Beings.

The Supreme Cool Beings played a live performance of eight songs for Calvin Johnson's radio show on KAOS (FM). Johnson took a cassette recording of that performance and used it as the band's first album, Survival of the Coolest, which would be the first release from K Records.

A 1983 review of the first release describes the band as "kind of sloppy," adding that "Heather's vocals come off sort of flat, and it's all kind of silly, but that's really the fun of it."

=== Beat Happening ===
Lewis had been a part of another trio with Johnson, which later lost a member and added Bret Lunsford. That trio was Beat Happening. Though Lewis had moved to Seattle, she remained in the band for an improvised tour of Japan, where they recorded their first demo.

Though Lewis was Beat Happening's drummer, the band didn't own a drum set for much of its existence. Instead, she would borrow drums from touring bands, or create impromptu drum sets out of garbage cans or cardboard boxes.

Lewis' role in Beat Happening, which rotated between drums, guitar, and vocals, is cited by important musicians from Olympia's riot grrl scene as an inspiration, such as Bratmobile's Molly Neuman, and Kathleen Hanna of Bikini Kill.
