= Bret Lunsford =

American musician

- Bret Lunsford outside Harry Everett Smith's former home in Anacortes, WA in 2024.

Background information
- Origin: Olympia, Washington, U.S.
- Genres: Indie pop; lo-fi; slacker rock; twee pop; noise pop; neo-psychedelia
- Instruments: Guitar, vocals, drums
- Years active: 1982 - Present

Bret Lunsford (born December 12, 1962) is an American vocalist, songwriter, guitarist, and founding member of the influential band Beat Happening and D+. In addition to his own musical endeavors, Lunsford owns and operates Knw-Yr-Own Records, an independent label based in Lunsford's hometown of Anacortes, Washington, and manages What the Heck Fest, an annual music festival featuring independent and local musicians. He is also a writer of cultural criticism, and author of Images of America, Anacortes. From 1990 to 2005, Lunsford was the owner of The Business record store in Anacortes.
