= Julián Delgado Lopera =

Colombian writer and performer

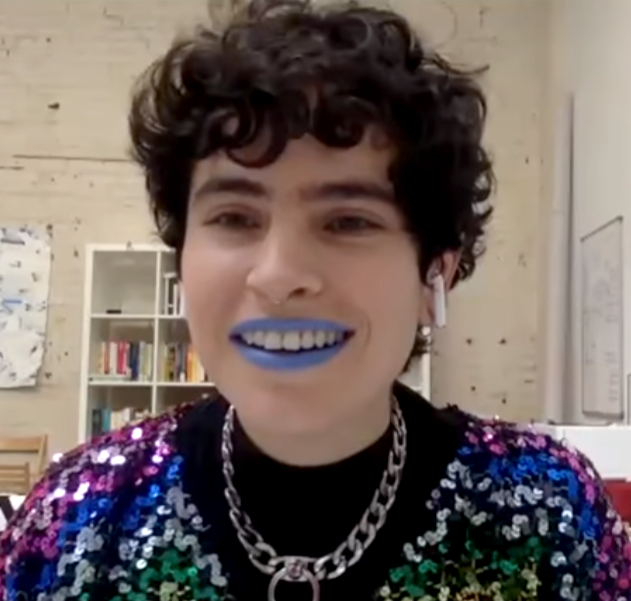
- In a San Francisco Public Library video in 2020
- Born: June 4, 1988 (age 38); Bogotá, Colombia
- Occupations: Poet, literary performer, bilingual writer, lgbt activist, oral historian
- Years active: 2015–present
- Notable work: ¡Cuéntamelo!, Fiebre Tropical
- Awards: National Endowment for the Arts Fellowship (2024)
- Website: juliandlopera.com

Julián Delgado Lopera (born June 4, 1988) is a queer Colombian writer and performer. He is the author of ¡Cuéntamelo!, an illustrated collection of queer immigrant histories in the United States during the 1980s. He uses creative expressions, such as writing, queer literary performance, and bilingual poetry to advance LGBT activism projects across the Bay Area. Delgado Lopera serves as the Executive/Artistic director for the nonprofit organization Radar Productions since 2015.

== Early life and education ==
Julián Delgado Lopera was born in Bogotá, Colombia and immigrated with his family to the United States in 2003 when he was fifteen years old. He first moved to Miami, Florida, then relocated to the Bay Area to find his queer home.

Delgado Lopera attended the University of California Berkeley where he earned a Bachelor's degree in Women and Gender Studies in 2011. He continued his education at San Francisco State University and graduated with a Master's of Fine Arts in Creative Writing in 2015.

== Notable works ==
Delgado Lopera has been published by Four Way Review, The Bold Italic, Weird Sister, Revista Canto, Transfer Magazine, Raspa Magazine, Black Girl Dangerous, and SF Weekly.

=== ¡Cuéntamelo! Oral Histories by LGBT Immigrants (2014) ===
¡Cuéntamelo! (tell me about it) was published in 2014. The book is a collection of oral histories featuring Latino, queer, Immigrants over the age of forty-five. All of the histories are illustrated and are available in English and Spanish. One of the subjects in ¡Cuéntamelo!, Adela Vazquez, a transgender immigrant woman of Cuban descent, influenced Delgado Lopera's interest in these untapped stories during a class presentation. Delgado Lopera first published four stories in the magazine SF Weekly titled "Cuentamelo: An Oral History of Queer Latin Immigrants in San Francisco" on June 26, 2013. He then received two creative writing awards from Galería de la Raza and the Queer Cultural Center, which allowed him to continue finding more histories speaking on the issues of homophobia, transphobia, xenophobia, and the AIDS pandemic. ¡Cuéntamelo! is credited with bringing histories of identity intersection like queer, immigration status, gender and age to light.

=== Quiéreme (2017) ===
Quiéreme (like me or love me) was published in March 2017. Quiéreme is a collection of essays documenting the experience of longing for love. Delgado Lopera plays with language in Quiéreme to create a mixed combination of English and Spanish into "Spanglish" as a form of bilingual literature.

=== Fiebre Tropical (2020) ===
Delgado Lopera's first novel debuted in March 2020 to positive critical reception. It was a finalist for the 2020 Kirkus Prize for Fiction, and in 2021, won the Lambda Literary Award for Lesbian Fiction and the Ferro-Grumley Award for LGBTQ Fiction.

== Activism ==
=== Radar Productions ===
Julián Delgado Lopera became the Executive/ Artistic director role of the Nonprofit organization Radar Productions in 2015. Writer Michelle Tea founded Radar Productions back in 2003; its mission is to commission and offer space for queer performers from diverse backgrounds to share their experiences. Radar Productions is based in San Francisco and organizes queer literature performances around the Bay Area that are open freely to the public.

Julián Delgado Lopera initiated "Queering the Castro" soon after becoming Executive and Artistic Direction of Radar Productions. "Queering the Castro" was a yearlong project with a mission to revive the Castro's queerness through a series of panel discussions, poetry readings, queer intimacy, drag queen storytelling, and bilingual performance. Under Delgado Lopera's leadership, Radar Productions received $25,000 from San Francisco's Grants for the Arts. Their mission for "Queering the Castro" sought to revive the queer culture and to make it more inclusive of communities of color through art exhibitions, poetry readings, and literary awards. They collaborated with Magnet, the gay men's health center in the Castro, the San Francisco Public Library's Eureka, Valley/ Harvey Milk Memorial Branch Library, and the GLBT History Museum run by the GLBT Historical Society.

=== Artistic contributions ===
As a Queer, Transgender, People of Color (QTPOC) activist, Delgado Lopera collaborated in "Noche de Ambiente" (night of atmosphere) a multimedia exhibition available to the public from October 2016 to February 2017 at the GLBT History Museum. "Noche de Ambiente" offered a glimpse into the life of LGBT Latino identities in San Francisco from the 1970s to the 1990s. Delgado Lopera volunteered at the GLBT History Museum, and during his time there, he was asked to participate in the "ambiente" exhibition. The term "ambiente" has been informally used as code for Latino queerness/resistance and as an introduction to the Latino LGBT social scene. Delgado Lopera collaborated in the exhibition to use art as a tool to educate the public about queer Latino History in the Bay Area, particularly in San Francisco. He recognizes the importance of making room for multi-national and inter-generational queer Latino History and the need to extend the term Latinidad in the U.S.

== Performance ==
=== Sister Spit ===
A performer of Sister Spit, a feminist, queer, comedic poetry roadshow, Delgado Lopera travels around the country. Sister Spit emerged during the 1990s as a weekly open-mic poetry slam retaliation against the wave of misogynistic poetry prominent around the San Francisco area at the time. Sister Spit now tours yearly after experiencing a revival as "Sister Spit: the next generation" in 2007. He was invited to participate in 2016 and continues to tour alongside Joshua Jennifer Espinoza, Cathy de la Cruz, Celeste Chan, Virgie Tovar, Maya Songbird, and Denise Benavides.

==== Other locations ====
Delgado Lopera has performed in various venues throughout the Bay Area and across the US. including Action Fiction!, Red Light Lit, Beast Crawl, Lit Quake, and has lectured at Wayward Writers.

== Awards and honors ==
The San Francisco Foundation named Delgado Lopera the winner of the Joseph Henry Jackson Award in 2014. He also received an award from the Regen Ginaa Artist Fund from Galería de la Raza in 2013 and the National Queer Arts Festival Grant from the Queer Cultural Center in 2014. Delgado Lopera was the recipient of a 2024 National Endowment for the Arts Fellowship in Creative Writing and a finalist for a 2026 National Book Award.

== See also ==
- Faux queen
- Latinidad – Shared attributes of Latin American people
- Prose poetry – Literary genre
- Spoken word – Type of performance art
