= Sini Anderson =

American film director

- Born: November 6, 1969 (age 56); Chicago, Illinois, U.S.
- Citizenship: American
- Organizations: Sister Spit (Co-founder) Queer Cultural Center (Co-chair, Board of Directors)
- Known for: The Punk Singer (2013)

Sini Anderson (born November 6, 1969) is an American film director, producer, performance artist, choreographer, dancer and poet, from Chicago, Illinois. Anderson is widely known for directing The Punk Singer (2013), a documentary about riot grrrl musician Kathleen Hanna's legacy and experience with late-stage Lyme disease.

== Early life in Chicago ==
Anderson did not attend high school or college. As a young adult, she began her artistic career as a professional dancer, studying contemporary modern dance with the Chicago Dance Medium. After some years of performing as a professional dancer in Chicago, Anderson desired a voice beyond choreography and began to write. At age 22, Anderson performed the first spoken word piece she had ever written at the Green Mill Cocktail Lounge in Uptown, Chicago, and won the slam for that evening. This was more than enough to encourage Anderson to fully delve into the Chicago poetry slam scene, prompting her to begin her own spoken word group called "The Words to Swallow Poets". Anderson continued to perform with The Words to Swallow Poets at local clubs and venues opening up for musical acts before moving to San Francisco.

== San Francisco ==
=== Introduction to feminism ===
Anderson is incredibly outspoken about her particular brand of feminism, which is entirely peer-taught, punk rock, and non-exclusionary. Having not have had the opportunity to attend high school or college and take women's studies classes, San Francisco was Anderson's creative college in terms of the feminist punk art scene. It was here in her early twenties that she first heard the phrase "feminist" and immersed herself into the works of feminist artists through zines and touring, falling in love with third wave feminism for its accessibility and protesting of popular culture. She cites Tammy Rae Carland, Kathleen Hanna, and Michelle Tea as her greatest peer influences. Anderson has said that her view of feminism has evolved over time yet still remains built around art, friends, and community. She has also said that vulnerability and a willingness to emote can be strengths rather than weaknesses for women, and are important aspects of feminism.

=== Sister Spit and Sister Spit's Ramblin' Road Show ===
Upon moving to San Francisco, Anderson was enraged by the massive sexism in the city's poetry slam scene. Within her first few months of living in San Francisco, Anderson became close friends with Michelle Tea, with whom she would co-create an all-girl weekly open mic series, Sister Spit (1994–1997), and Sister Spit's Ramblin Road Show, a spoken word tour from 1997 to 2000. Anderson and Tea performed in San Francisco for three years before they began Sister Spit's Rambling Road Show, in which they took ten other queer performers on the road with them across the country for three consecutive six-week national summer tours. Sister Spit released several albums including I Spit on Your Country (1997) on Mercury Records, Sister Spit's Ramblin Road Show (1998), Sister Spit's Ramblin Road Show (1999), Greatest Spits!: A Spoken Word Compilation (2001) on Mr. Lady Records and Tribe Spit Deep (2002). Her work is also found in The Outlaw Bible of American Poetry (ThunderMouth Press) and Word Warriors: 35 Women Leaders in the Spoken Word Revolution (Seal Press).

=== Involvement in San Francisco's queer community ===
Anderson spent much of her career in San Francisco’s queer community as Chief Curator/Artistic Director for The National Queer Arts Festival, a co-producer for the Nectar Stage at San Francisco's Pride, president of the board of directors for the Harvey Milk Institute, and co-chair of the board of directors for The Queer Cultural Center.

== Career as an independent filmmaker ==
Anderson always knew she wanted to be a filmmaker, but didn't believe it was possible without film school. Nevertheless, Anderson's interest in the underground San Francisco film scene in the late 90s prompted her to work with other artists and assist first-time directors in making films. Anderson then began to make her own short films, incorporating video to go with her stage performances, becoming a multimedia performance artist.

=== The making of The Punk Singer and Hanna's Lyme disease ===
Anderson and Hanna had known about each other as fellow artists for years, but it wasn't until mutual friend Tammy Rae Carland introduced the two at the Michigan Women's Music Festival in 2000 that the pair became friends. In 2009, family and friends grew increasingly worried about Hanna's deteriorating health. Hanna had initially approached Anderson about directing the documentary Who Took the Bomp? (2010) for her band, Le Tigre, but Anderson was more concerned with preserving the legacy of her career as a whole. In the spirit of third wave feminism, Hanna agreed to have the documentary made only if Anderson would direct it; Hanna encouraged Anderson to make her first feature-length while Anderson encouraged Hanna to tell her story. Anderson has stated that it is important for people "to hear the deeper story of who [Hanna] is and where she came from, so that they could feel less alone." Halfway through filming, Hanna was diagnosed with late-stage Lyme disease.

The film initially was not about Hanna's Lyme disease. Anderson's purpose of making the film was to tell the story of Hanna's participation in the riot grrrl movement and career in punk band Bikini Kill through interviews conducted with Hanna's family and friends, and archival footage retrieved from personal archives. The story evolved on its own, giving it entirely new purpose. She has stated that Lyme disease is "such an isolating disease, quite often our own families don't even understand it." Anderson feels that Hanna's willingness "to show the vulnerability" of her illness can "potentially be of service to other people".

==== Film release and reception ====
The film premiered in March 2013 at SXSW to positive reviews, and proceeded to be released in 73 cities across America.

The film was distributed by IFC films.

Anderson's film has won numerous awards such as the Seattle International Film Festival's "Lena Sharpe Aware for Persistence of Vision, Women in Cinema" and Mexico City's Distrital International Film Festival's "Best First Feature Director" and "ARCA Best Director Award", and POV's Humanitarian Award in Media.

In May 2014, BuzzFeed reported that some of the Kickstarter backers of The Punk Singer did not get the items they paid for, including signed posters, sneak previews and tickets to a private screening. Anderson said that since the documentary was now owned by IFC Films, she was unable to provide sneak previews or private screenings.

== Anderson's Lyme disease ==
Only six weeks after friend Kathleen Hanna's diagnosis of late stage Lyme disease, Anderson ended up in the hospital with signs of a possible heart attack or stroke, receiving an official diagnosis of late stage Lyme a month later. At first, doctors told Anderson that there was nothing wrong with her, despite her getting more ill with every passing day. Not wanting to complicate the story of The Punk Singer or detract the focus from Hannah's illness, Anderson was reluctant to admit publicly during the filming that she had been diagnosed as well.

As the making of the film went into post-production, Anderson grew more ill, ending up on an IV PICC line as a means of receiving intravenous antibiotic treatments. The treatments have strengthened Anderson's health and immune system, but today she still keeps a close watch for telltale signs of sickness, taking herbs and eating a healthy diet.

After The Punk Singer was made, Anderson learned of 17 other feminist queer artists in her inner-circle that had been diagnosed with late-stage Lyme disease as well. Today, the number of diagnosed feminist queer artists that Anderson knows personally has grown to 75.

== Other works and future products ==
Other independent film credits include first assistant director on Miggy n Lil (2006), Bare Knuckle (2007), and Karma Calling (2009).

Anderson directed the book trailer for the memoir Whip Smart by Melissa Febos, which won Best Short Documentary at the Fetisch Film Festival 2010.

She has directed numerous music videos including Jolie Holland's "All Those Girls" (2012), Lovers' "Girl in the Grass" (2014), and Girlpool's "Blah Blah Blah" (2014).

Additionally, Anderson has lectured at several universities across America such as Yale University, Wesleyan University, University of Pennsylvania, Smith College, Rutgers University, and Ohio Wesleyan.

=== So Sick (2016) ===
Anderson is currently in production of her second feature-film, a documentary titled So Sick. The film is Anderson's vessel of exploring the epidemic of feminist artists, academics, and activists with late stage Lyme disease.

== Personal life ==
Anderson lived in San Francisco, California in her 20s and currently splits her time between Brooklyn, New York and Los Angeles, California.

She identifies as queer and lesbian.

== See also ==
- List of female film and television directors
- List of lesbian filmmakers
- List of LGBT-related films directed by women
