= Michelle Tea =

American writer (born 1971)

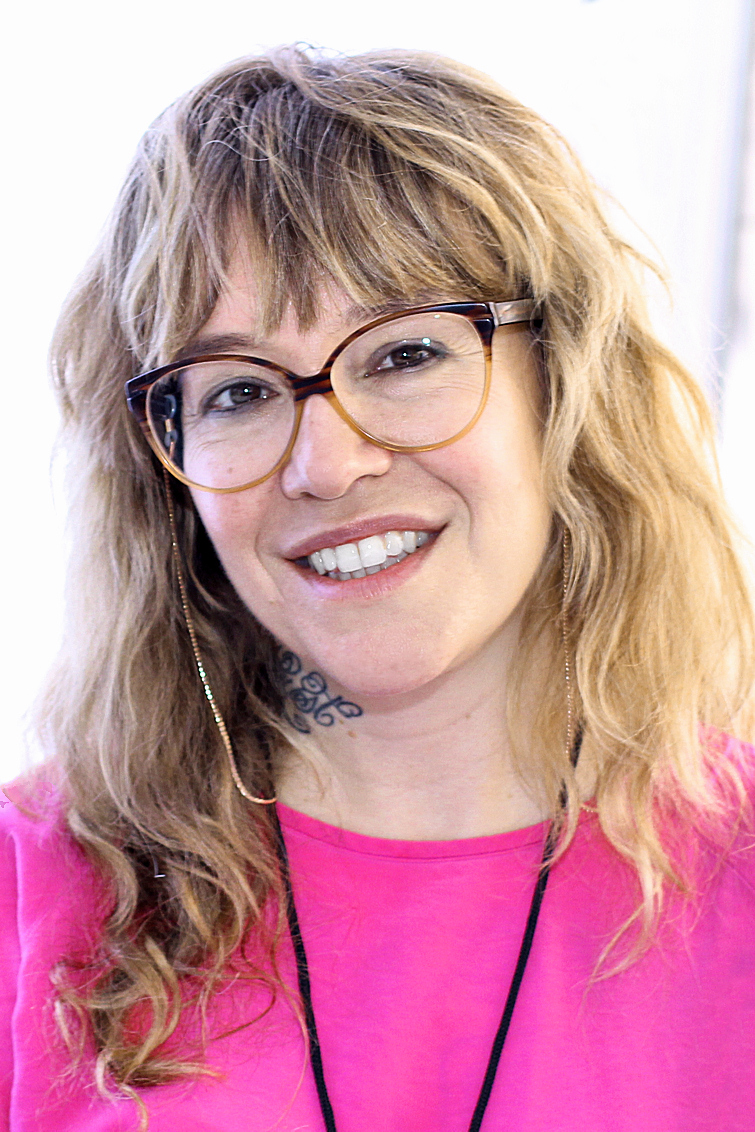
- Tea at the 2018 Texas Book Festival
- Born: Michelle Tomasik; 1971 (age 54–55); Chelsea, Massachusetts, United States
- Occupations: Author; poet; director
- Writing career
- Genres: Poetry, memoir, fiction

Michelle Tea (born Michelle Tomasik, 1971) is an American author, poet, and literary arts organizer whose autobiographical works explore queer culture, feminism, race, class, sex work, and other topics. She is originally from Chelsea, Massachusetts and was active in the San Francisco literary and arts community for many years. She currently lives in Los Angeles. Her books, mostly memoirs, are known for their exposition of the queercore community.

== Early life ==
Tea grew up in Chelsea, Massachusetts in a working-class family. Her father was a Polish Catholic and her mother was Irish and French Canadian. In high school, Tea identified with the goth subculture and artists such as Siouxsie Sioux. She was also drawn to literary work including The Outsiders by S. E. Hinton, the poetry of Sylvia Plath, and the beat movement.

When she was twenty years old, Tea read Angry Women from RE/Search Publications, which included interviews with radical female performers, writers, and thinkers. The book was highly influential. "That really made me see that there is a lineage [of female writers], and a path, and I could really put myself on that," she explained in an interview.

During her childhood, Tea's stepfather spied on her through a drilled hole in the wall of her bedroom. She struggled with this abuse, and she was in denial for many years. Tea began drinking alcohol as a teenager. When she was 19 years old, her stepfather admitted to the abuse, but Tea's mother chose to stay with him. It was at this time that Tea moved out of her home and relocated to the home of her then-girlfriend in Boston.

During this period, Tea supported herself with two minimum wage jobs as a hair salon receptionist and deli shop employee. Her girlfriend, a sex worker, was earning significantly more money than she did, and Tea decided to go into sex work as well. In the early 1990s, Tea broke up with her girlfriend and moved to San Francisco.

== Career ==
=== Spoken word and Sister Spit ===
In San Francisco, Tea immersed herself in the spoken word scene. In 1994, Tea and Sini Anderson formed Sister Spit, a queer feminist collective. The group hosted weekly open mic nights in San Francisco, which attracted local and underground talent, as well as more established writers such as Mary Gaitskill, Eileen Myles, and Beth Lisick. In 1997, Sister Spit launched Ramblin' Road Show, a spoken word tour that performed in bars, galleries, bookstores, community centers, and other venues in the United States and Canada. The tour was briefly revived in 2007 with Sister Spit: The Next Generation, which featured artists such as Ariel Schrag, Justin Vivian Bond, Blake Nelson, Nicole J. Georges, Cristy Road, Eileen Myles, and Beth Lisick.

In 1998, Tea's first book, The Passionate Mistakes and Intricate Corruption of One Girl in America, was published by Semiotexte/Smart Art Press. The book contained short stories in memoir form, exploring topics such as Tea's childhood in Massachusetts, her teenage interest in the goth subculture, and sex work.

=== Valencia ===
In 2000, Tea's memoir Valencia was published. The book chronicles the life of Michelle, a young queer poet, in the Mission District of San Francisco. The plot primarily focuses on the love life of the main character, as she dates multiple women over the course of a year. Tea explained in an interview, "The 'Michelle' in the book is definitely me, though if it makes a reader more comfortable to imagine it's all a giant work of fiction, that's fine too." The book talks frankly about the traumas she has faced and of those around her, including poverty, prostitution, sexual abuse and homophobia. The book won the 2001 Lambda Literary Award for Lesbian Fiction. Tea served as the executive producer of Valencia: The Movie. Based on her novel of the same name, the experimental film was spearheaded by filmmaker Hilary Goldberg. Valencia was filmed by 20 different lesbian, queer, and trans directors, each assigned a different chapter of her novel. The twenty one different 'Michelle' characters "vary in age, gender, size, ethnicity, style and era."

=== Radar Productions ===
In 2003, Tea founded Radar Productions, a nonprofit organization that produces events to showcase the work of queer writers and artists. She served as creative director for twelve years before stepping down in 2015. Julián Delgado Lopera took her place. In 2015, with Radar, Tea created the first Drag Queen Story Hour in San Francisco.

=== Other work ===
Tea has toured with the Sex Workers' Art Show. She was also a contributor to The Believer magazine.

In February 2008, Tea was the 23rd Zale Writer-in-Residence at the H. Sophie Newcomb Memorial College Institute at Tulane University.

In 2012, Tea partnered with City Lights Publishers to form the Sister Spit imprint. In 2016, she created Amethyst Editions, an imprint of Feminist Press, and in 2023 launched the nonprofit press Dopamine Books.

From 2012 to 2015, Tea wrote a column for xoJane, where she chronicled the difficulties she faced in trying to have a baby with her partner, Dashiell. Her articles documented the stress and difficulty that accompanied fertility treatments and artificial insemination, and additionally illuminated gaps that existed for queer couples in a system that was created with heterosexual couples in mind. Her experiences trying to conceive and preparing for parenthood led her to start the website Mutha Magazine, an alternative parenting website for parents that do not identify with mainstream parenting media.

In 2015, Tea published Black Wave, an apocalyptic novel set in San Fancisco in 1999.

In 2018, Tea published Against Memoir, a collection of journalistic articles on different topics.

== Critical reception ==
Tea and Clint Catalyst's 2004 anthology, Pills, Thrills, Chills and Heartache was featured by Publishers Weekly and reached #10 on the Los Angeles Times non-fiction paperback bestseller list in its first week of release. The book was a 17th Lambda Literary Awards finalist in the Anthologies/Fiction category. Her books have often been nominated in these awards, beginning with the 2001 Lesbian Fiction nomination and award for Valencia.

Her book Rose of No Man's Land was a 2007 Stonewall Honor Book in Literature.

She was awarded the Jim Duggins Outstanding Mid-Career Novelists' Prize by the Saints and Sinners Literary Festival in 2008.

In February 2019, Tea won the PEN/Diamonstein-Spielvogel Award for the Art of the Essay for her book Against Memoir.

== Personal life ==
Tea was in a relationship with Katastrophe for many years. They shared an apartment in the North Beach district of San Francisco. In 2013, Tea married Dashiell Lippman at the Swedish American Hall in San Francisco. In 2015, their son was born. On March 5, 2022, Tea married TJ Payne at the Madonna Inn in San Luis Obispo.

She is bisexual.

== Published work ==
- The Passionate Mistakes and Intricate Corruption of One Girl in America (1998) ISBN 1-57027-074-0
- Valencia (2000) ISBN 1-58005-035-2
- The Chelsea Whistle (2002) ISBN 1-58005-073-5
- The Beautiful (2003) ISBN 0-916397-89-0
- Rent Girl (2004) ISBN 0-86719-620-3
- Rose of No Man's Land (2006) ISBN 1-59692-160-9
- Transforming Community (2007) ISBN 0-9789023-4-3
- Coal to Diamonds: A Memoir (2013) ISBN 0-385525915 (with Beth Ditto)
- Mermaid in Chelsea Creek (2013) ISBN 1-938073363
- How to Grow Up: A Memoir (2015) ISBN 0-142181196
- Girl at the Bottom of the Sea (2015) ISBN 1-940450004
- Black Wave (2016) ISBN 1908276908; And Other Stories, UK ISBN 9781908276902
- Modern Tarot: Connecting with Your Higher Self Through the Wisdom of the Cards (2017) ISBN 9780062682406
- Against Memoir: Complaints, Confessions & Criticisms (2018) ISBN 978-1936932184; And Other Stories, UK ISBN 978-1911508625
- Knocking Myself Up: A Memoir of My (In)Fertility (2022) ISBN 978-0063210622
- Modern Magic: Stories, Rituals, and Spells for Contemporary Witches (2024) ISBN 978-0063378193
- Little F (2026) ISBN 978-1917008235

Anthologies

- Pills, Thrills, Chills, and Heartache: Adventures in the First Person (ed. with Clint Catalyst) (2004) ISBN 1-55583-753-0
- Without a Net: The Female Experience of Growing Up Working Class (ed.) (2004) ISBN 1-58005-103-0
- Baby, Remember My Name: An Anthology of New Queer Girl's Writing (ed.) (2006) ISBN 0-7867-1792-0
- Sister Spit: Writing, Rants and Reminiscence from the Road (ed.) (2012) ISBN 0-87286-566-5

== See also ==
- Lesbian poetry
