= Sister Spit =

Sister Spit was a lesbian-feminist spoken-word and performance art collective based in San Francisco, signed to Mr. Lady Records. They formed in 1994 and disbanded in 2006. Founding members included Michelle Tea and Sini Anderson, Other members included Jane LeCroy and poet Eileen Myles. The group were noted for their Ramblin' Roadshow, performing at feminist events such as the Michigan Womyn's Music Festival. The Boston Phoenix described it as "the coolest (and cutest) line-up of talented, tattooed, pierced, and purple-pigtailed performance artists the Bay Area has to offer."

The Independent Weekly magazine described the group as a "literary celebration of outspoken and courageous feminists". Sister Spit performed on numerous occasions at the Michigan Womyn's Music Festival, as well as on multiple tours across the United States, chiefly to LGBT audiences, including the Castro Street Fair, Pride and Ladyfest in San Francisco. They played at such locations as Boston, Cambridge, Massachusetts and Buffalo, New York.

Michelle Tea revived the tour in April 2007, calling the new incarnation Sister Spit: The Next Generation. The new group includes original Sister Spitters Eileen Myles and Ali Liebegott, as well as younger writers such as Cristy Road, Nicole Georges, and Rhiannon Argo.

For a month on the road, Sister Spit: The Next Generation traveled across the U.S. and Canada, and occasionally through Europe, performing mainly at universities and art centers. In order to reflect changes in gender identity and sexual orientation, the line-up no longer includes only women. Performers have included Nicole Georges, Cristy Road, Eileen Myles, Beth Lisick, Blake Nelson, Justin Vivian Bond and Ariel Schrag.

In 2017, the 20th Anniversary Sister Spit tour included Denise Benavides, Virgie Tovar, Maya Songbird, Celeste Chan, Cathy de la Cruz, Julián Delgado Lopera and Joshua Jennifer Espinoza.

== Sister Spit and City Lights Publishers ==
In 2012, Sister Spit made the long-desired leap from promoting and supporting up-and-coming queer, feminist writers to actually shepherding them into print via a collaboration with City Lights Publishers. The new imprint, City Lights/Sister Spit, began by publishing the anthology Sister Spit: Writing, Rants and Reminiscence from the Road. Subsequently, it has published works by Ali Liebegott, Beth Lisick, and others. In their 40th-anniversary issue, Ms. magazine named the anthology a "great read" of the season that honors the cultural institution that is the Sister Spit roadshow.

The mission of the City Lights/Sister Spit imprint is to publish primarily but not exclusively writings that are informed by a queer, feminist outsider perspectives. Editor Michelle Tea wishes to nurture work from people who struggle to find a place.

== Membership ==
Sister Spit had a rotating membership. Members for many or all shows included

- Michelle Tea - writer; co-founder and co-host of Sister Spit
- Sini Anderson - performance poet, producer, and director; co-founder and co-host of Sister Spit
- Ida Acton - author
- Kirk Read - writer and performer
- Marci Blackman - novelist, Stonewall Book Award winner
- Cooper Lee Bombardier - writer and visual artist
- Lynnee Breedlove - lead singer of Tribe 8 and writer
- Tara Jepsen - performance artist, actor, and writer
- Rocco Kayiatos (Katastrophe) - poet and beatboxer
- Beth Lisick - writer, filmmaker and musician
- Shar Rednour- author, filmmaker, podcast host
- Miranda Mellis - dancer, trapeze artist, and poet
- Eileen Myles - author
- Sara Seinberg - photographer
- Anna Joy Springer - professor at UCSD
- Samuael Topiary - filmmaker, performer, PhD candidate at UCSC
- Ali Liebegott - author
- Amos Mac - photographer
- MariNaomi - cartoonist
- Myriam Gurba - author
- Blake Nelson - author
- Nicole J. Georges - cartoonist
- Sash Sunday - heckler/roadie
- Kat Yoas - author

== Releases ==
- I Spit On Your Country: Words From The '97 Roadshow, Mouth Almighty Records, 1998
- Sister Spit's Ramblin' Road Show - Greatest Spits, Mr. Lady Records, May 29, 2001.
- Tribe Spit Deep, 2002

== Bibliography ==
- Tea, Michelle. Sister Spit: Writing, Rants and Reminiscence from the Road (City Lights, 2012). ISBN 978-0-87286-566-2, editor: Michelle Tea. Collection of essays, stories, poetry and comics from Michelle Tea, Rhiannon Argo, Cooper Lee Bombardier, Harry Dodge, Nicole J. Georges, Myriam Gurba, Tara Jepsen, Ali Liebegott, Elisha Lim, Beth Lisick, Tamara Llosa-Sandor, MariNaomi, Ben McCoy, Lenelle Moïse, Eileen Myles, Blake Nelson, Kirk Read, Cristy C. Road, Sara Seinberg, Cassie J. Sneider, Samuael Topiary and Kat Marie Yoas.
- Felix, Dia. Nochita (City Lights, 2014). ISBN 978-0-87286-612-6
- Moïse, Lenelle. Haiti Glass (City Lights, 2014). ISBN 978-0-87286-614-0
