= IPRC =

IPRC may refer to:

- Independent Publishing Resource Center
- The International Pacific Research Center at the University of Hawaii
- Indo Pacific Rugby Championship: rugby union competition
