= Elisha Lim =

Artist

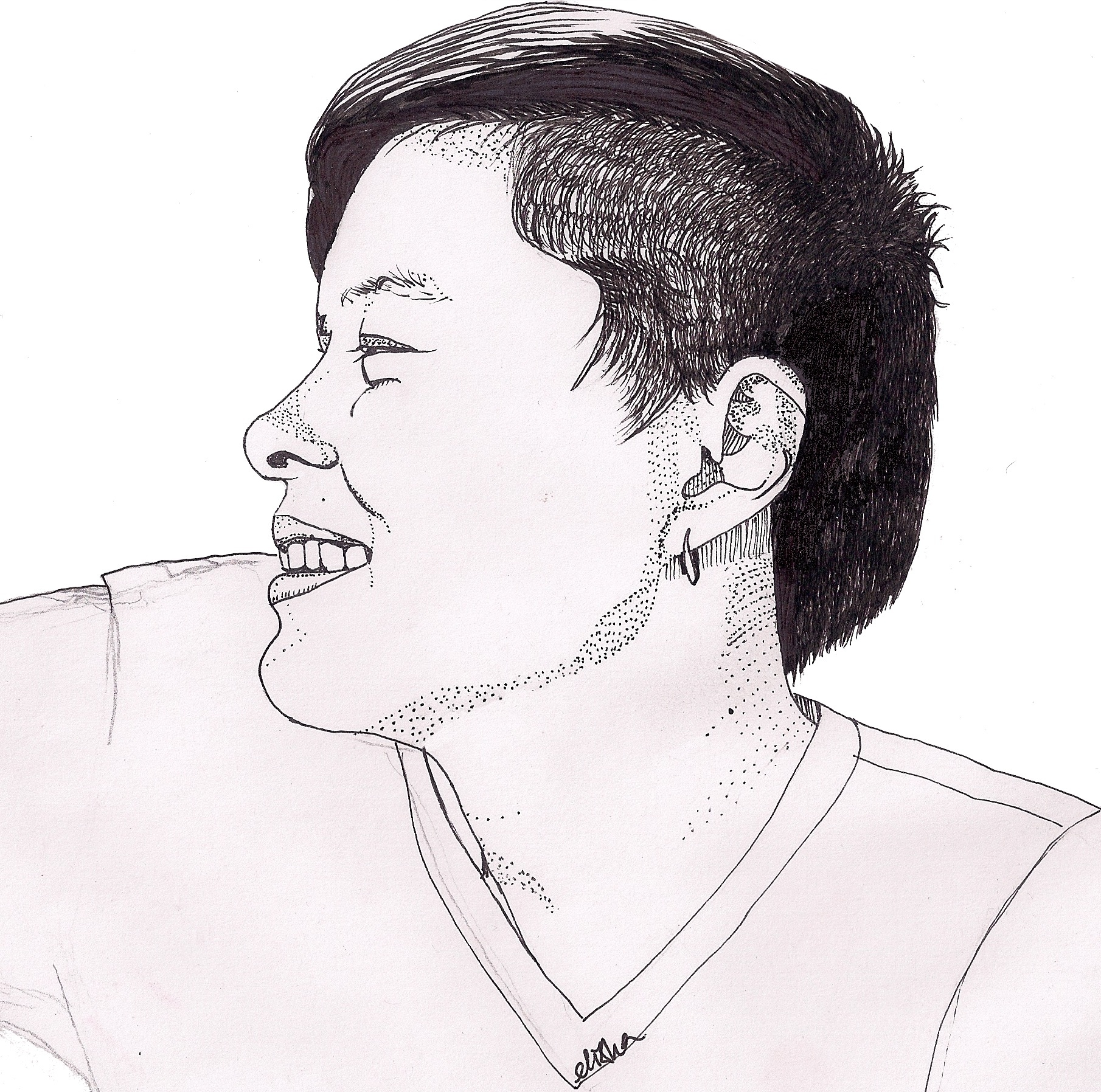
- Self-portrait
- Born: Toronto
- Occupations: Graphic novelist, Illustrator
- Writing career
- Genre: Social commentary
- Notable work: 100 Butches
- Movements: Queer, postcolonialism
- Website: elishalim.com

Elisha Lim (born 1978) is a scholar, artist and graphic novelist living in Toronto. Lim advocates the use of the gender-neutral pronoun "they". Lim is currently an assistant professor at York University, in the faculty of Liberal Arts & Professional Studies. Their research focuses on social media, theology, and critical race theory.

== Early life ==
Elisha Lim was born in Toronto and attended Catholic convent primary and secondary schools in Singapore. Their sister is the writer and cultural critic Thea Lim.

== Career ==
=== Graphic novels ===
Lim's upcoming graphic novel, 7 Dreams About You, is about the author's "effort to quit identity economics", and nightmares arising from past romantic relationships.

Their first graphic novel, 100 Butches, is a collection of queer portraits and anecdotes amassed while travelling around the world. It was due to be released in 2008 through Alyson Books, but many of Alyson's contracts were suspended as the publishing house sought a new buyer. When negotiations failed, its parent company switched Alyson to e-book only publishing in 2010, and several titles including 100 Butches were dropped. Lim signed a new contract with Magnus Books in 2011. It has received gay media coverage regardless, which dubbed Lim a "Queer Woman to Watch" on afterellen.com, and an "Artist in Residence" by Curve Magazine. Lim also toured North America with Michelle Tea's queer writer's caravan Sister Spit, presenting excerpts from the novel. 100 Butches has been awarded grants by the Canada Arts Council and the Ontario Arts Council.

=== Comics ===
Since finishing 100 Butches, Lim has drawn a variety of comic strips. The Sweetest Taboo was a comic about children's pop culture in the 1980s that ran in Capital Xtra!, "Queer Pioneers" ran in Diva Magazine, and the 12-panel wall calendar "Sissy" is a self-published celebration of femininity and sissydom.

=== Art practice ===
Lim creates portraits of marginal subcultures out of traces or pastels, and usually incorporates anecdotes or captions in the subjects' own words. Lim's exhibits include The Illustrated Gentleman at Allyson Mitchell and Deirdre Logue's FAG Gallery, 100% Mixed Race at the A-Space Gallery, "Generations of Queers" at OCAD University, Sissy at William Way Community Centre.

=== Scholarly books ===
Lim's upcoming book Pious is about distorted identity politic, including ethnic fraud and corporate solidarity statements.

== Personal life ==
Lim came out as queer in Berlin before moving back to Canada, where they credit the Asian Arts Freedom School for inspiring a turn to anti-racist activism. Lim has organized and co-founded events in Toronto that promote queer and trans people of colour, including Fresh to Def and Les Blues. The Toronto Star called Lim a 'Celesbian', and in 2012, Lim was called one of the Top 25 Significant Queers of 2011, and one of 100 Canadian People of Colour activists.

=== Music ===
Lim pursued a music career until a fortune teller told Lim to quit and take up drawing. Nevertheless, they play in a band called The Sex Appeals, whose members are queer people of colour, and whose music has been noted for having original "poppy hooks and quirky song titles"; their drummer, Nadine Forde, describes their music as "crotch pop". Other members include Ali Naqvi on synth, Sarah Creagen on violin, and Patrick Salvani on bass. Amongst other gigs, they have played at Toronto Pride and the Art Gallery of Ontario.

== Bibliography ==
=== Graphic novel ===
- 100 Butches (Magnus Books, 2012, ISBN 978-1-936833-12-2)

=== Articles ===
- Identity Politics Economics in C: International Contemporary Art, (143), 50+.
- (2021). Personal Identity Economics: Facebook and the Distortion of Identity Politics. Social Media + Society, 7(2), 205630512110174.
- (2020). The Protestant Ethic and the Spirit of Facebook: Updating Identity Economics. Social Media + Society, 6(2), 205630512091014.

=== Chapters ===
- In Handbook : supporting queer and trans students in art and design education (OCAD University, [2018], ISBN 9781772520064)
- "Immigrants in solidarity with indigenous people" in The solidarity struggle : how people of color succeed and fail at showing up for each other in the fight for freedom (BGD Press, Inc., 2016. ISBN 9780988628656)
- "A Conversation about Art and Activism with Trans and Genderqueer People Labelled with Intellectual Disabilities" (illustrations) inTrans activism in canada: A reader (Canadian Scholars' Press Inc., 2014)

=== Comics ===
- "Queer Pioneers," Diva (magazine), about notable dead lesbians
- "Sweetest Taboo," Capital Xtra!, 2009, memoirs of a gay child in the 80s
- "Big Mama Thornton" Shameless Magazine Issue 13: Fall 2009
- "The Illustrated Gentleman," No More Potlucks, 2010
- "Gender Revolution," Women's Review of Books, July/August 2011
- "100 Butches," Gay Genius edited by Annie Murphy, Sparkplug Books, 2011
- "Trans ladies first" Bitch Magazine, Issue 52: Fall 2011
- 100 Crushes, Koyama Press, June 2014. ISBN 9781927668061

=== Cover illustrations ===
- One in Every Crowd by Ivan Coyote, Arsenal Pulp Press, 2012, ISBN 978-1-55152-459-7
- Persistence: All Ways Butch and Femme edited by Ivan Coyote and Zena Sharman, Arsenal Pulp Press, 2010, ISBN 978-1-55152-397-2
- Shameless, Issue 13: Fall 2009
- Briarpatch Magazine
