= Dody Dorn =

American film editor

- Born: Dody Jane Dorn; April 20, 1955 (age 71); Santa Monica, California, U.S.
- Occupations: Film and sound editor
- Awards: Golden Reel (1989)

Dody Jane Dorn (born April 20, 1955) is an American film and sound editor. She is best known for working with director Christopher Nolan on several films including Memento (2000), for which she was nominated for an Academy Award.

Dorn has also worked multiple times with director Ridley Scott.

== Life and career ==
Dorn was born into a film industry family, her father having worked as a set designer and film producer. Dorn attended Hollywood High School and it was there that she decided to pursue a career as a math teacher. A job behind the scenes at a movie sound stage led her towards working in the film industry. Dorn appeared in two films as an actress (including a nude "Archbishop" in the 1976 satire Tunnel Vision), before moving behind the camera. She worked her way up the food chain (working as a production assistant, script supervisor, assistant location manager, and several other freelance jobs), before attaining the position of assistant film editor, which she held until 1982. Finding it unusually difficult to move up to picture editing, Dorn made a lateral move to sound editing. Her work as a sound editor on James Cameron's The Abyss (1989) won the Golden Reel Award and was nominated for a best sound Academy Award.

In 1986, she started her own sound company, Sonic Kitchen, but with time, got more and more disenchanted and distracted with the daily business grind. Dorn had begun to lose interest and was compelled to get back to her passion, feature film picture editing. It was the editing of Memento which brought Dody Dorn's picture editing to the attention of the rest of the world. She has since continued to work with director Christopher Nolan on several films and has repeatedly worked with noted film director Ridley Scott. In addition to her credited editing on Scott's films, Dorn worked on the 2003 DVD releases of Alien (the "Director's Cut"). Dorn was selected for membership in the American Cinema Editors.

== Selected filmography ==
=== As film editor ===
| Year | Film | Director | Other notes |
|---|---|---|---|
| 1994 | Floundering | Peter McCarthy | |
| 1996 | Guy | Michael Lindsay-Hogg | |
| 1996 | A Small Domain | Britta Sjogren | Short |
| 1997 | Sick: The Life and Death of Bob Flanagan, Supermasochist | Kirby Dick | |
| 1998 | Prague Duet | Roger L. Simon | |
| 1998 | I Woke Up Early the Day I Died | Aris Illiopulos | |
| 1999 | Treasure Island | Scott King | |
| 1999 | Guinevere | Audrey Wells | |
| 1999 | Sleeping Beauties | Jamie Babbit | Short |
| 2000 | Memento | Christopher Nolan | Nominated—Academy Award for Best Film Editing; Nominated—ACE Eddie |
| 2001 | The Sleepy Time Gal | Christopher Münch | |
| 2001 | Life with Judy Garland: Me and My Shadows | Robert Ackerman | TV release. Nominated - Emmy, ACE |
| 2002 | Insomnia | Christopher Nolan | |
| 2003 | Matchstick Men | Ridley Scott | |
| 2005 | Kingdom of Heaven | Ridley Scott | Extended commentary by Dorn on Director's Cut DVD |
| 2006 | A Good Year | Ridley Scott | |
| 2007 | Year of the Dog | Mike White | |
| 2008 | Australia | Baz Luhrmann | Nominated—Satellite Award for Best Editing |
| 2010 | I'm Still Here | Casey Affleck | |
| 2010 | London Boulevard | William Monahan | |
| 2012 | End of Watch | David Ayer | |
| 2014 | Sabotage | David Ayer | |
| 2014 | Fury | David Ayer | |
| 2016 | Ben-Hur | Timur Bekmambetov | |
| 2017 | Power Rangers | Dean Israelite | |
| 2019 | Light of My Life | Casey Affleck | |
| 2020 | Come Away | Brenda Chapman | |
| 2021 | Zack Snyder's Justice League | Zack Snyder | Additional editor |
| 2021 | Army of the Dead | Zack Snyder | |
| 2023 | Rebel Moon – Part One: A Child of Fire | Zack Snyder | |
| 2024 | Rebel Moon – Part Two: The Scargiver | Zack Snyder | |
| 2026 | Mercy | Timur Bekmambetov | |
| 2026 | Heart of the Beast | David Ayer | |

=== As sound editor / assistant sound editor ===
- Max Dugan Returns (1983) (assistant sound editor)
- Class (1983) (sound editor)
- The Big Chill (1983) (assistant sound editor) (uncredited)
- Racing with the Moon (1984) (Foley editor)
- Silverado (1985) (Foley editor)
- Children of a Lesser God (1986) (sound editor)
- The Big Easy (1986) (sound editor)
- Tapeheads (1988) (supervising sound editor)
- Powwow Highway (1989) (supervising sound editor)
- The Abyss (1989) (supervising sound editor)
- The Big Picture (1989) (supervising sound editor)
- State of Grace (1990) (supervising sound editor)

== Accolades ==
- 1990 The Abyss (won) Motion Picture Sound Editors MPSE Golden Reel Award Best Sound Editing - Sound Effects w/ co-editor Blake Leyh
- 2001 - Life with Judy Garland: Me and My Shadows (nominated) Emmy Award
- 2002 - Life with Judy Garland: Me and My Shadows (nominated) ACE Eddie Award Outstanding Single Camera Picture Editing for a Miniseries, Movie or a Special
- 2002 - Memento (nominated) Academy Award Best Editing
- 2002 - Memento (nominated) American Cinema Editors ACE Eddie Award Best Edited Feature Film - Dramatic
- 2002 - Memento (nominated) The American Film Institute AFI Film Award AFI Editor of the Year
- 2002 - Memento (nominated) Phoenix Film Critics Society Awards PFCS Award Best Film Editing
- 2002 - Memento (won) Las Vegas Film Critics Society Film Awards - Sierra Award Best Editing
- 2003 - Insomnia (nominated) Satellite Awards Golden Satellite Award Best Film Editing

In 2012, the Motion Picture Editors Guild listed Memento as the fourteenth best-edited film of all time based on a survey of its membership.
