= Portland Zine Symposium =

Annual event in Portland, Oregon, U.S.

- Logo
- Frequency: Annually
- Locations: Portland, Oregon, U.S.
- Website: portlandzinesymposium.org

The Portland Zine Symposium is an annual zine event in Portland, Oregon, United States. Established in 2000 or 2001, it is among the nation's largest zine events. Portland Monthly has described the event as a "free, volunteer-run, DIY-loving fest".

== History ==
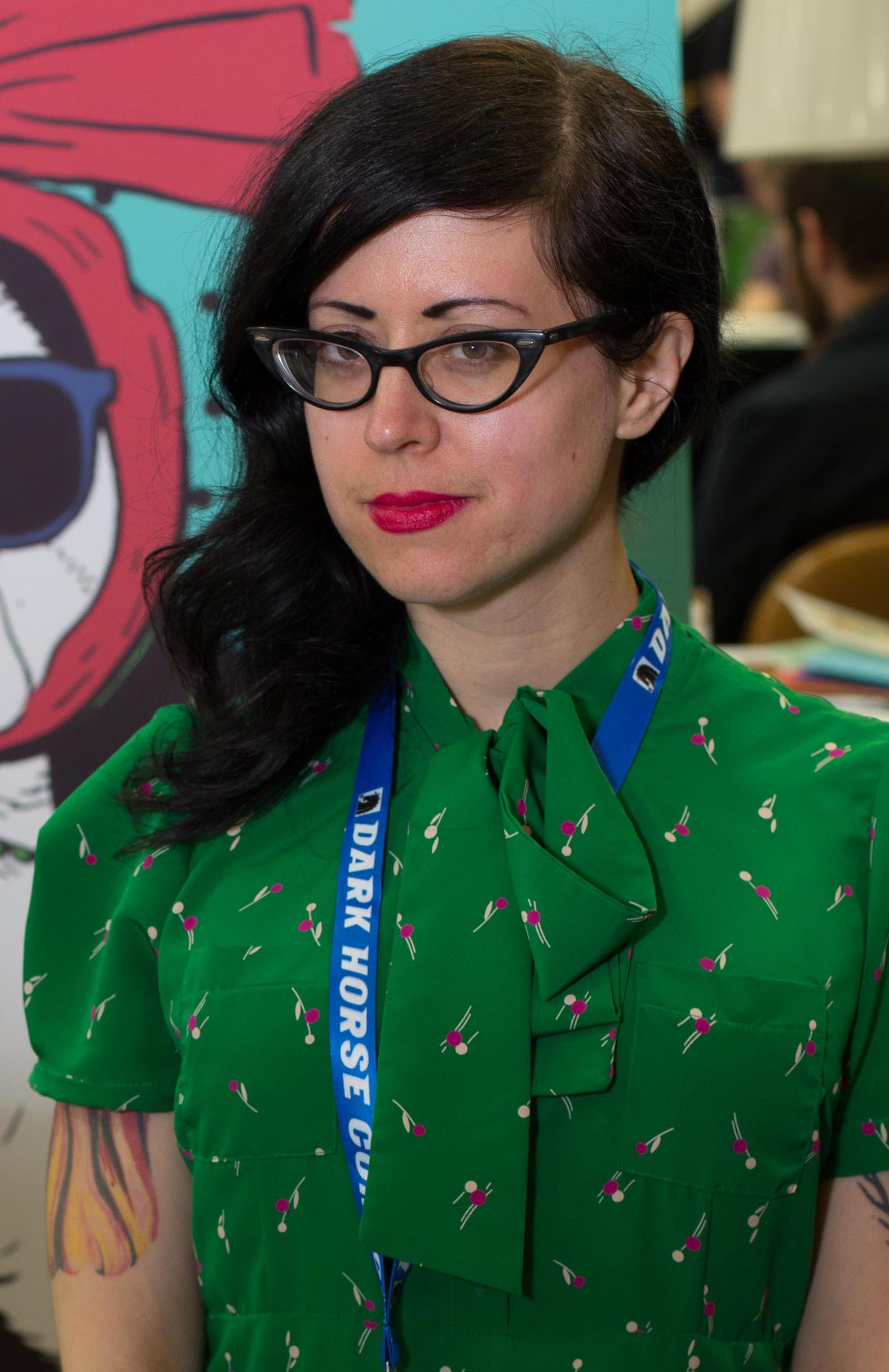
Nicole Georges (pictured at Stumptown Comics Fest in 2013) is among co-founders of the annual event.

The event was founded by Elly Blue, Nicole Georges, Eleanor Whitney, and Alex Wrekk. Approximately ten people organized the first event.

The 2009 event had a party at Holocene and three days of panel discussions and workshops. There were 230 vendors at the 2010 event. Refuge PDX hosted the event in 2013.

The 2016 event was held at Ambridge Event Center and the Independent Publishing Resource Center. In 2017, a majority of tablers were nonbinary, transgender, or people of color.

The 2020 and 2021 events were canceled because of the COVID-19 pandemic. The 2025 event was held at Portland State University's Smith Memorial Student Union. The same venue is hosting in 2026.

In 2025, the Multnomah Arts Center hosted an exhibit focused on the event's history.

== See also ==
- Culture of Portland, Oregon
