= LisaGay Hamilton =

American actress (born 1964)

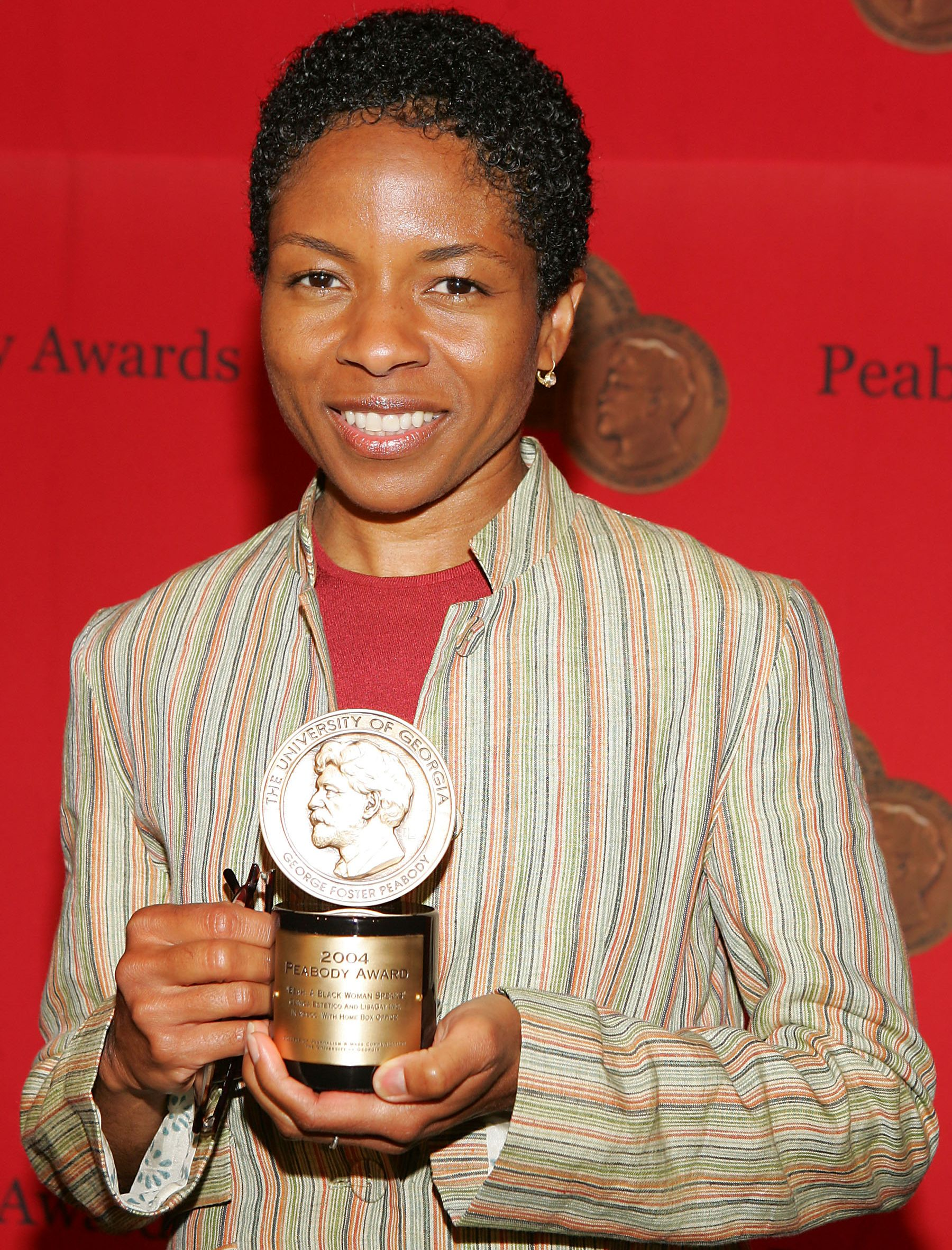
- Hamilton with her Peabody Award, 2005
- Born: March 25, 1964 (age 62); Los Angeles, California, U.S.
- Education: Carnegie Mellon University; New York University (BFA); Juilliard School (GrDip)
- Occupation: Actress
- Years active: 1985–present
- Spouse: Robin D. G. Kelley (m. 2009)
- Relatives: Robert B. Blackwell (uncle)
- Website: www.lisagayhamilton.com

LisaGay Hamilton (born March 25, 1964) is an American actress who has portrayed roles in films, television, and on stage. She is best known for her role as secretary/lawyer Rebecca Washington on the legal drama The Practice (1997–2003). She also portrayed Melissa Thoreau on the TNT comedy-drama Men of a Certain Age (2009–2011), Celia Jones on the Netflix series House of Cards (2016), Suzanne Simms on the Hulu series Chance (2016), and Kayla Price in The First (2018), also by Hulu.

Hamilton's film credits include roles in 12 Monkeys (1995), Jackie Brown (1997), Beloved (1998), True Crime (1999), The Sum of All Fears (2002), The Soloist (2009), Beastly (2011), Beautiful Boy (2018), and Vice (2018). Her theater credits include Measure for Measure (Isabella), Henry IV Parts I & II (Lady Hotspur), Athol Fugard's, Valley Song and The Ohio State Murders. Hamilton was also an original cast member in the Broadway productions of August Wilson's The Piano Lesson and Gem of the Ocean. In 2005 she won a Peabody Award for creating and directing the 2003 documentary film Beah: A Black Woman Speaks.

== Early life ==
Hamilton was born March 25, 1964 in Los Angeles, California but spent most of her childhood in Stony Brook, New York on the north shore of Long Island. Her father, Ira Winslow Hamilton, Jr., hailed from Bessemer, Alabama, and her mother, the former Eleanor Albertine "Tina" Blackwell (sister of Robert B. Blackwell, former mayor of Highland Park, Michigan), was from Meridian, Mississippi. Both parents graduated from historically black colleges—Tina attended Talladega while Ira went to Morehouse—and they both became successful professionals. Ira worked for a while as an engineer and then went into business as a general contractor. Tina eventually earned a master's degree in social work and worked for the Girl Scouts for many years.

Hamilton fell in love with theater at an early age. During the 1970s, she saw several off-Broadway productions by the Negro Ensemble Company, including A Soldier's Story and The First Breeze of Summer. She enrolled in Carnegie Mellon University to study theater, but after a year was accepted into New York University's Tisch Drama School where she earned a Bachelor of Fine Arts in Theater in 1985. She then pursued graduate studies at The Juilliard School where she earned a M.A. in drama in 1989.

== Career ==
Early on, Hamilton set her sights on classical theater. In one of her first notable roles, she played opposite Kevin Kline in Measure for Measure in the New York Shakespeare Festival. Hamilton's performances in Much Ado About Nothing, Tartuffe, Reckless, Family of Mann, and Two Gentlemen of Verona, earned her a reputation as a serious dramatic actor. In 1995–96, her portrayal of a young, aspiring South African singer in Athol Fugard's Valley Song garnered an Obie Award, the Clarence Derwent Award, the Ovation nomination for best actress, and a Drama Desk nomination. More recently, Hamilton earned critical acclaim, her second Obie, and a Lucille Lortel Award nomination for her role as Suzanne Alexander in Adrienne Kennedy's The Ohio State Murders.

Hamilton appeared in over two dozen films, including The Truth About Charlie and Beloved for director Jonathan Demme, Clint Eastwood's True Crime, the independent films; Palookaville, Drunks, Showtime's A House Divided, and as Ophelia in director Campbell Scott's film version of Hamlet. She has worked on several projects with director Rodrigo García, notably his films Ten Tiny Love Stories, Nine Lives, and Mother and Child. Honeydripper directed by John Sayles and The Soloist, directed by Joe Wright.

Hamilton won a Peabody Award in 2005 for creating and directing the 2003 documentary film Beah: A Black Woman Speaks. The film tells the story of pioneering black actress Beah Richards, who had broken ground for African-American actresses. The two women had met on the set of Beloved (1998). Over the next two years, Hamilton made a record of more than 70 hours of their conversations. Hamilton's film explored Richards' political activism as well as her poetry. The film won the Grand Jury Prize at the AFI Film Festival. After Richards died in 2000, Hamilton collaborated with illustrator R. Gregory Christie to turn one of her poems into a children's book. Keep Climbing Girls was published by Simon and Schuster in 2006.

Hamilton played the role of Melissa in Men of a Certain Age, an hour-long comedy-drama television series starring Ray Romano, Andre Braugher, and Scott Bakula that ran from 2009 to 2011.

In the fall of 2010, Hamilton took a faculty position at the School of Theater for the California Institute of the Arts, where she teaches in the Acting Program.

== Filmography ==
=== Film ===
| Year | Title | Role | Notes |
|---|---|---|---|
| 1985 | Krush Groove | Aisha | |
| 1990 | Reversal of Fortune | Mary | |
| 1993 | Naked in New York | Marty | |
| 1995 | Drunks | Brenda | |
| 1995 | Palookaville | Betty | |
| 1995 | Clarissa | Porter Russell | TV movie |
| 1995 | 12 Monkeys | Teddy | |
| 1997 | Nick and Jane | Vickie | |
| 1997 | Lifebreath | Dr. Quinlan | |
| 1997 | Jackie Brown | Sheronda | |
| 1998 | The Defenders: Choice of Evils | Jeanne Baptiste | TV movie |
| 1998 | Halloween H20: 20 Years Later | Shirley 'Shirl' Jones (voice) | |
| 1998 | Beloved | Younger Sethe | |
| 1999 | True Crime | Bonnie Beechum | |
| 1999 | Swing Vote | Virginia Mapes | TV movie |
| 2000 | A House Divided | Julia | TV movie |
| 2000 | Hamlet | Ophelia | TV movie |
| 2002 | The Sum of All Fears | Capt. Lorna Shiro | |
| 2002 | Ten Tiny Love Stories | Three | |
| 2002 | The Truth About Charlie | Lola Jansco | |
| 2005 | Nine Lives | Holly | |
| 2007 | Honeydripper | Delilah | |
| 2008 | Deception | Det. J Russo | |
| 2009 | The Soloist | Jennifer Ayers | |
| 2009 | Mother and Child | Leticia | |
| 2011 | Take Shelter | Kendra | |
| 2011 | Beastly | Zola Davies | |
| 2012 | The Hypnotist | The Hypnotist | Short |
| 2013 | Lovelace | Marsha | |
| 2013 | Go for Sisters | Bernice | |
| 2013 | Life of a King | Sheila King | |
| 2013 | Redemption Trail | Tess | |
| 2014 | Line of Sight | Ruby Jensen | TV movie |
| 2016 | Indiscretion | Karen Wyatt | |
| 2016 | The Wilding | Emily Bergom | TV movie |
| 2018 | Beautiful Boy | Rose | |
| 2018 | Vice | Condoleezza Rice | |
| 2019 | Ad Astra | Adjutant General Amelia Vogel | |
| 2019 | The Last Full Measure | Celia O'Neal | |
| 2019 | Ghosting: The Spirit of Christmas | Deb | TV movie |
| 2022 | Another Country | Narrator | Short |
| 2023 | The Boogeyman | Dr. Weller | |
| 2026 | By Any Means | Ms. Rebecca Brewer | |

=== Television ===
| Year | Title | Role | Notes |
|---|---|---|---|
| 1993 | Homicide: Life on the Street | Latoya Kennedy | Episode: "A Dog and a Pony Show" |
| 1994 | All My Children | Celia Wilson | Regular Cast |
| 1994 | New York Undercover | Suki | Episode: "To Protect and Serve" |
| 1995 | Law & Order | Denise Johnson | Episode: "Purple Heart" |
| 1996 | One Life to Live | Dr. Laura Reed | Regular Cast |
| 1997–2003 | The Practice | Rebecca Washington | Main Cast: Season 1-7 |
| 1998 | Ally McBeal | Rebecca Washington | Episode: "The Inmates" |
| 2002 | Intimate Portrait | Herself | Episode: "LisaGay Hamilton" |
| 2002 | Hollywood Squares | Herself | Recurring Guest |
| 2002 | Sex and the City | Kendall | Episode: "Critical Condition" |
| 2004 | The L Word | Art Show Attendee | Episode: "Losing It" |
| 2005 | Independent Lens | Herself/Narrator | Episode: "Red Hook Justice" |
| 2005 | ER | Nadine Hopkins | Episode: "All About Christmas Eve" |
| 2006 | Without a Trace | Sherise Gibbs | Episode: "The Calm Before" |
| 2006–2013 | Law & Order: Special Victims Unit | Teresa Randall | Guest Cast: Season 7-8 & 14 |
| 2007 | Numb3rs | Sari Kinshasa | Episode: "Money for Nothing" |
| 2009–2011 | Men of a Certain Age | Melissa Thoreau | Main Cast |
| 2012 | Southland | Melanie | Episode: "Identity" |
| 2013 | Grey's Anatomy | Dr. Connie Ryan | Episode: "Readiness Is All" & "Perfect Storm" |
| 2014 | Grimm | Mrs. Pittman | Episode: "The Last Fight" |
| 2014 | Scandal | Ambassador | Episode: "Where the Sun Don't Shine" |
| 2016 | House of Cards | Celia Jones | Recurring Cast: Season 4 |
| 2016 | Chance | Suzanne Silver | Main Cast: Season 1 |
| 2016 | Code Black | Dr. Kim Carrie | Episode: "Exodus" |
| 2018 | Elementary | Lt. Colonel Robin Deakins | Episode: "Give Me the Finger" |
| 2018 | The First | Kayla Price | Main Cast |
| 2018–2019 | Sorry for Your Loss | Bobby Greer | Guest: Season 1, Recurring Cast: Season 2 |
| 2019 | The Blacklist | Dr. Grey | Episode: "The Ethicist (No. 91)" |
| 2021 | This Is Us | Aunt Mae | Episode: "Birth Mother" |
| 2021 | The Rookie | Henry's Doctor | Episode: "Brave Heart" |
| 2022 | The Dropout | Judith Baker | Recurring Cast |
| 2022 | The Lincoln Lawyer | Judge Mary Holder | Recurring Cast: Season 1 |
| 2022–2023 | Winning Time: The Rise of the Lakers Dynasty | Christine Johnson | Recurring Cast |
| 2023 | Class of '09 | Tayo's Mom | Recurring Cast |
| 2023–2025 | Will Trent | Evelyn Mitchell | Recurring Cast: Season 1, Guest: Season 3 |
| 2024 | Genius | Alberta Williams King | Recurring Cast: Season 4 |
| 2024 | Accused | Lenore Skilling | Episode: "Marcus' Story" |
| 2025 | The Gilded Age | Frances Ellen Watkins Harper | Recurring Cast: Season 3 |
| 2025 | Ripple | Georgia | Recurring Cast |

=== Stage ===
| Year | Title | Role | Theatre |
|---|---|---|---|
| 1990 | The Piano Lesson | Grace | Walter Kerr Theatre |
| 2004 | Gem of the Ocean | Black Mary | Walter Kerr Theatre |
| 2019 | To Kill a Mockingbird | Calpurnia | Shubert Theatre |
| 2023 | Stew | Mama | Pasadena Playhouse |

== Awards and nominations ==
| Association | Year | Category | Nominated work | Results | Ref |
|---|---|---|---|---|---|
| Acapulco Black Film Festival | 2014 | Best Actress | Go for Sisters | Nominated | |
| American Film Institute Awards | 2003 | Documentary Award | Beah: A Black Woman Speaks | Won | |
| Black Reel Awards | 2000 | Best Supporting Actress — Theatrical | True Crime | Nominated | |
| Black Reel Awards | 2005 | Outstanding Television or Miniseries Film (as Producer) | Beah: A Black Woman Speaks | Nominated | |
| Black Reel Awards | 2005 | Best Director, Network/Cable Television | Beah: A Black Woman Speaks | Nominated | |
| Black Reel Awards | 2005 | Best Screenplay, Original or Adapted, Network/Cable | Beah: A Black Woman Speaks | Nominated | |
| Black Reel Awards | 2014 | Outstanding Actress, Motion Picture | Go for Sisters | Nominated | |
| Clarence Derwent Awards | 1996 | Best Supporting Female (USA) | —N/a | Won | |
| Gotham Awards | 2005 | Best Ensemble Performance | Nine Lives | Nominated | |
| Gotham Awards | 2011 | Best Ensemble Performance | Take Shelter | Nominated | |
| Lady Filmmakers Film Festival | 2014 | Feature Film (Best Actress) | Redemption Trail | Won | |
| Locarno International Film Festival | 2005 | Best Actress | Nine Lives | Won | |
| Miami Film Festival | 2004 | Documentary Features | Beah: A Black Woman Speaks | Nominated | |
| NAACP Image Awards | 2000 | Outstanding Actress in a Motion Picture | True Crime | Nominated | |
| NAACP Image Awards | 2000 | Outstanding Supporting Actress in a Drama Series | The Practice | Nominated | |
| NAMIC Vision Awards | 2012 | Best Performance — Drama | Men of A Certain Age | Nominated | |
| News & Documentary Emmy Awards | 2005 | Outstanding Individual Achievement in a Craft: Direction | Beah: A Black Woman Speaks | Nominated | |
| Screen Actors Guild Awards | 1999 | Outstanding Performance by an Ensemble in a Drama Series | The Practice | Nominated | |
| Screen Actors Guild Awards | 2000 | Outstanding Performance by an Ensemble in a Drama Series | The Practice | Nominated | |
| Screen Actors Guild Awards | 2001 | Outstanding Performance by an Ensemble in a Drama Series | The Practice | Nominated | |
