= Adrienne Fuzee =

American art curator (1950–2003)

- Born: Adrienne Louise Fuzee; May 16, 1950; Los Angeles, California
- Died: May 18, 2003 (aged 52); Oakland, California
- Occupations: Art curator, gallerist, editor

Adrienne Louise Fuzee (May 16, 1950 – May 18, 2003) was an American artist, curator, gallerist, editor, poet, and activist, based in California.

== Early life and education ==
Fuzee was born in Los Angeles, the daughter of Lawrence Fuzee and Beulah Francis Fuzee. Her parents were both born in Louisiana. She graduated from Our Lady of Loretto High School in 1968. She attended El Camino College in the mid-1970s.

== Career ==
Fuzee curated art exhibits including "Jean Cornwell: Paintings and Sculptures" (1992) at the Lyceum Theatre gallery in San Diego, "Primal Edge" (1994) at SOMAR Gallery, "San Diego Contemporary Art" at the Yokohama Citizens Gallery, "Techno Art" at the Spectrum Gallery in San Francisco, "Torch and Anvil" (1989) at the San Francisco Arts Commission Gallery, "Contempo Lesbos" (1998) at Queer Arts Resource in San Francisco, "Sheets in the Wind: A History of the Poster in the LGBT Community" (2002) at the Hormel Center, San Francisco Public Library.

Fuzee was president of the City of San Francisco Art Commission Gallery Advisory Board. She co-edited a journal of criticism, Unsolicited Commentary, with Garland Kyle. She taught at the San Francisco Art Institute. She was one of the founding directors of the Queer Cultural Center and founder and co-chair of Lesbians in the Visual Arts. She was community organizer for the Harvey Milk Center in 1980. In 1990 she was curator of Berkeley's Zocalo Gallery. Fuzee also wrote poetry and gave poetry readings in San Francisco.

== Personal life and legacy ==
Fuzee's partner was Lisa Kahaleole Hall. Diabetes became a serious health concern in her last years, as she lost vision in one eye, and her lower leg was amputated. She died in Oakland in 2003, two days after her 53rd birthday, from heart failure. Her papers are in the GLBT Historical Society in San Francisco. Fuzee is one of the figures included in Jon Macy and Avery Cassell's The Butch Lesbians of the '50s, '60s, and '70s Coloring Book (2018).
