= The Punk Singer =

- Directed by: Sini Anderson
- Produced by: Sini Anderson; Gwen Bialic; Tamra Davis; Rachel Dengiz; Erin Owens; Alan Oxman
- Starring: Kathleen Hanna; Joan Jett; Adam Horovitz
- Cinematography: Jennie Jeddry; Moira Morel
- Edited by: Jessica Hernández; Bo Mehrad
- Production company: Sundance Selects
- Release dates: March 10, 2013 (SXSW film festival); November 29, 2013 (Limited theatrical and digital)
- Running time: 80 minutes
- Country: United States
- Language: English

The Punk Singer is a 2013 documentary film about feminist singer Kathleen Hanna who fronted the bands Bikini Kill and Le Tigre, and who was a central figure in the riot grrrl movement. Directed by filmmaker Sini Anderson and produced by Anderson and Tamra Davis, the film's title is taken from the Julie Ruin song "The Punk Singer", from Hanna's 1998 solo effort.

== Synopsis ==
Using a combination of interviews and archival footage including live band performances, the film traces the life and career of Hanna from her troubled upbringing and her start in spoken word performance poetry, through her riot grrrl zines, her prominent punk and dance-punk bands, her coining of the phrase "Smells Like Teen Spirit" for Kurt Cobain, her solo career as Julie Ruin, her feminist activism, her marriage to Beastie Boys member Adam Horovitz, and ending with Hanna's 2010 diagnosis of late-stage Lyme disease and the severe treatments she endures to combat it.

== Production ==
Anderson filmed Hanna off and on for a year starting in July 2010. Hanna had already amassed a collection of archival footage and ephemera; these and further finds were worked into the documentary. Horovitz appears as a strong, steadying supporter of his wife, and he filmed one of the more troubling scenes himself. Co-producer Davis, the wife of Beastie Boy Mike D, came to the project near the end to help finish it. Anderson funded the film through various ways, initially with a benefit concert including Sonic Youth's Kim Gordon performing at the Knitting Factory and then through a Kickstarter campaign which raised $46,000. The film, Anderson's first feature-length documentary, premiered in March 2013 at SXSW (South by Southwest) in Austin, Texas, where it was positively reviewed. The film was picked up for distribution in North America by Sundance Selects. On November 29, 2013, its general theatrical release was initiated in New York and Los Angeles, as well as a digital release on iTunes.

The film was the first public announcement of Hanna's battle with Lyme disease. Since 2005, Hanna had been struggling with symptoms of the disease without knowing the cause; this resulted in her telling her Le Tigre bandmates that she was finished as a singer/songwriter, that she had written all she ever intended to write. In the film Hanna says that this explanation was not true, that instead she was suffering nervous system troubles and that she did not want to admit she was unable to perform on stage. The film was also the first public revelation of certain details of Hanna's childhood and her marriage.

== Appearing ==
The film interviews many people who observed Hanna's career including:

- Adam Horovitz, Beastie Boys, husband of Hanna
- Tamra Davis, introduced Hanna and Horovitz
- Billy Karren, lead guitarist of Bikini Kill
- Kathi Wilcox, zine writer, bandmember of Bikini Kill and the Julie Ruin
- Johanna Fateman, zine writer, bandmember of Le Tigre
- Sadie Benning, videographer, bandmember of Le Tigre
- JD Samson, visual artist, bandmember of Le Tigre
- Lynn Breedlove, punk musician, LGBT activist, writer
- Jennifer Baumgardner, feminist writer
- Kim Gordon, bassist for Sonic Youth, punk music producer
- Carrie Brownstein, guitarist/vocalist in Sleater-Kinney
- Corin Tucker, guitarist/vocalist in Sleater-Kinney
- Jen Smith, riot grrrl zine editor, punk musician
- Ann Powers, music writer
- Joan Jett, rocker and music producer
- Allison Wolfe, zine writer, punk musician
- Tavi Gevinson, founder of Style Rookie blog and Rookie Mag
- Leo Galland MD, Lyme disease expert

Hanna determined that the number of men interviewed should be minimal. She told Anderson not to feature Thurston Moore of Sonic Youth, Ian MacKaye of Fugazi, or Calvin Johnson of Beat Happening, even though she liked them and respected their opinions. She said, "I want women to be the experts. I don't want these male experts to come in to make it legitimate." Hanna wanted Tobi Vail, zine writer and bandmember of Bikini Kill to be interviewed in the film, but Vail chose to keep her privacy. In the film, Vail appears in archival footage to talk about Hanna and the punk scene.
