= Beth Lisick =

American author and actress

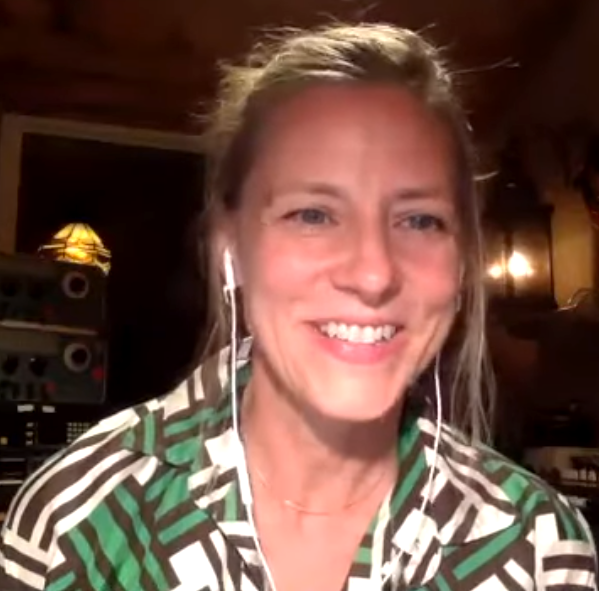
- In an online discussion in 2020
- Born: December 13, 1968 (age 57); Saratoga, California, U.S.
- Occupations: Author, writer, performer, actress
- Spouse: Eli Crews
- Children: One
- Writing career
- Genres: Poetry; Fiction; Sketch comedy Storytelling; Acting
- Website: bethlisick.com

Beth Lisick (born December 13, 1968, in Saratoga, California) is an American writer, performer, and author of six books. With Arline Klatte, she co-founded the Porchlight Storytelling Series of spoken word performances in San Francisco in 2002. Her spoken word performances were featured at the Lollapalooza festival, the South by Southwest Music Festival, Bumbershoot, and Lilith Fair. She has toured with Sister Spit. She has also performed sketch comedy with the group White Noise Radio Theatre at SF Sketchfest and has an ongoing film and stage collaboration with Tara Jepsen. The pair wrote and acted in an original web series entitled "Rods and Cones", which was named one of Indiewire's 25 Best Series/Creators of 2014.

In 2009, she appeared in the film Everything Strange and New, directed by award-winning American filmmaker Frazer Bradshaw. The film screened at numerous festivals including Sundance Film Festival, Munich Film Festival, Karlovy Vary International Film Festival, and the San Francisco International Film Festival, where it won the FIPRESCI Award.

In 2011, she received a grant from the Creative Work Fund to collaborate on a book project with Creativity Explored. The result is a ten-part series of chapbooks entitled Tell You What.

Lisick is married to recording engineer and producer Eli Crews. Together they have one child, Gus.

== Bibliography ==
- Monkey Girl, Manic D Press (1997) ISBN 0-916397-49-1
- This Too Can Be Yours, Manic D Press (2001) ISBN 0-916397-73-4 — winner of the 2002 Firecracker Alternative Book Award for Fiction
- Everybody Into the Pool: True Tales, HarperCollins/ReganBooks (2005) ISBN 0-06-083426-9
- Helping Me Help Myself: One Skeptic, Ten Self-Help Gurus, and a Year on the Brink of the Comfort Zone (2008) ISBN 0-06-114396-0
- Yokohama Threeway (2013) ISBN 9780872866256
- Edie on the Green Screen (2020) ISBN 978-1-7333672-0-2

=== Anthologies ===
- Best American Poetry. James Tate, ed. (1997) ISBN 0684814528
- The Post-It Note Diaries. Arthur Jones, illustrator.(2011) ISBN 0452296978
- The Speed Chronicles, Akashic. Joseph Mattson, ed. (2011) ISBN 161775028X
- Yes Is the Answer, Rare Bird Books. Marc Weingarten, Tyson Cornell, eds. (2013) ISBN 0985490209
- Santa Cruz Noir, Akashic. Susie Bright, ed. (2018) ISBN 9781617756474

== Filmography ==
List of film roles
Year	Title	Role	Notes
1999	Spectres of the Spectrum	Voice of Boo Boo	directed by Craig Baldwin
2002	Compulsory Breathing	Woman	short film directed by David Munro
2003	The Rest of the World		short film directed by Frazer Bradshaw
2005	24/7	Cookie Feltcher	video short
2005	Diving for Pearls	Carole Murphy	co-directed by Beth and Tara Jepsen
2009	Everything Strange and New	Reneé	directed by Frazer Bradshaw
2010	Sinking State	Bernadette	short film directed by Frazer Bradshaw
2011	Treatment	Debra	Feature film directed by Sean Nelson and Steven Schardt
2013	Redemption Trail	Larraine	Feature film directed by Britta Sjogren
2013	Tick Tock for Ding Dongs	Carole Murphy	short film directed by Beth and Tara Jepsen
2013	Food Coma		short film
2013	Stepsister	Beth	short film directed by Joey Izzo
2014	Rods and Cones	Carole Murphy	web series written/directed/starred in by Beth and Tara Jepsen
2014	My Daughter's Boyfriend	Beth Martinson	short film directed by Joey Izzo
2015	Transparent	Shopkeeper	Amazon TV series. Episode directed by Joey Soloway
2016	Pushing Dead	Receptionist	feature film directed by Tom E. Brown
2016	I Was There Too	Beth	short film directed by Joey Izzo
2018	Send Me	Woman	No Age music video directed by Jonn Herschend
2019	Director's Commentary	Lisa	short film directed by Jonn Herschend
