= Robert B. Blackwell =

American politician (1921–2008)

Personal details
- Born: Robert Brendahl Blackwell; November 4, 1921 Meridian, Mississippi
- Died: December 16, 2008 (aged 87) Highland Park, Michigan
- Party: Republican (to 1979); Democratic (1979 to 2008)
- Spouse: Florrie Love Willis
- Relations: LisaGay Hamilton (niece)
- Children: 4
- Education: Howard University
- Occupation: Attorney

Robert B. Blackwell (November 4, 1921 – June 15, 2008) was a Michigan politician. He was the first African American mayor of a Michigan city elected by popular vote. He was first elected mayor of Highland Park in 1968.

== Early life ==
Robert Brendahl Blackwell was born in Meridian, Mississippi, on November 4, 1921, the eldest of five children and only son of Arthur Brendahl and Emma (Mason) Blackwell. He attended Talladega College in the early 1940s later completing his undergraduate studies at Howard University in 1949.

The following year, Blackwell moved to Highland Park where he worked as a production planning expediter for Chrysler. He served three terms as president of UAW Chrysler Local 889 while studying for a law degree at the University of Detroit.

== Political life ==
Blackwell entered the political arena as a Republican in the early 1960s. In 1963, then-Gov. George Romney appointed him executive secretary of the state Labor Mediation Board. After three unsuccessful attempts to run for Michigan's 13th district seat on the U.S. House of Representatives against Charles C. Diggs Jr., Blackwell was appointed to fill a vacancy on the Highland Park City Council, becoming the city's first Black city councilman.

In 1968, Blackwell ran for mayor of Highland Park, finishing second in the primary ahead of State Rep. James Karoub to qualify for the run-off. This is significant because the population of Highland Park was 60% white and Blackwell qualified without significant support from the Black community. Apparently, many Black voters did not believe that the light-skinned Blackwell was African American. However, in the general election against white insurance investigator Harold McCoy, Blackwell won by a healthy margin.

YEAR	Robert B. Blackwell	Harold McCoy
1968	5,812	3,911

As a result, Blackwell became the first Black mayor elected in Michigan by popular vote. Previous Black mayors in Flint, Saginaw, and Ypsilanti were elected as city councilmen and were appointed to part-time, largely ceremonial positions. He also became the nation's only Black Republican mayor.

Blackwell successfully ran for reelection, but lost in 1975, when seeking a third term. In 1979, after switching to the Democratic party, he regained his seat.

== Legacy ==
In 2007, the City of Highland Park Municipal Complex was renamed in his honor.

== See also ==
- List of first African-American mayors
