= Fiebre Tropical =

2020 novel by Juliàn Delgado Lopera

- Paperback 1st ed.
- Author: Juliàn Delgado Lopera
- Genre: Young adult fiction
- Publisher: Amethyst Editions
- Publication date: March 4, 2020
- Pages: 240 (1st ed.)
- ISBN: 9781936932757 (1st ed.)
- OCLC: 1129198914
- Dewey Decimal: 813/.6
- LC Class: PS3604.E44395 F54 2020

Fiebre Tropical is a bilingual young adult novel by Juliàn Delgado Lopera, published March 3, 2020 by Feminist Press.

== Reception ==
=== Reviews ===
Fiebre Tropical was well-received by critics, including starred reviews from Publishers Weekly and Kirkus Reviews, who also named it one of the best books of the year.

Kirkus Reviews called Fiebre Tropical a "rich, deeply felt novel about family ties, immigration, sexual longing, faith, and desire," saying it was "[s]imultaneously raw and luminous."

Publishers Weekly called Lopera's writing "funny, fresh, and indelible." The Los Angeles Review of Books referred to the main character's voice as "captivating" and "riotously funny."

Lambda Literary said the book is "[f]unny, irreverent, and deeply moving with its pitch-perfect rendering of the kaleidoscopic emotionality of the character." They also highlighted the book's bilingual prose, saying it is "a much-needed approach to writing about not only immigration but life itself in America. This country is a multi-lingual one, and it is past due that our literature reflects this."The New York Times Book Review also commented on the book's use of both English and Spanish "to bold and farcical effect." Because of the bilingualism, Shelf Awareness noted that "monolinguists may want to have a translation app handy for full comprehension. But context more often than not brings absolute clarity." Booklist called the code-switching "engaging and lyrical."

=== Awards ===
Year	Award	Category	Result	Ref.
2020	Kirkus Prize	Fiction	Finalist	
2021	Ferro-Grumley Award	LGBTQ Fiction	Won	
2021	Lambda Literary Award	Lesbian Fiction	Won	
