= Valencia (novel) =

2000 Lambda Literary Award-winning novel by Michelle Tea

- Author: Michelle Tea
- Language: English
- Genre: Novel
- Publisher: Seal Press
- Publication date: 2000
- Publication place: United States
- Media type: Print (Hardback & Paperback)
- Pages: 216 pp (first edition, hardback)
- ISBN: 1-58005-238-X

Valencia is a 2000 Lambda Literary Award-winning novel by Michelle Tea. It is an autobiographical novel detailing the narrator's experiences in San Francisco's queer subculture. It includes experimentation with consensual sado-masochism after the author meets Petra, a knife-wielder; as well as Willa, a tormented poet; and Iris, a young butch who escaped from a repressive southern upbringing to San Francisco.

== Film adaptation ==
During 2011, Valencia was adapted into an arthouse film, with twenty-one different lesbian and queer directors enlisted to film each of the book's twenty-one chapters within a series of short film segments. They include Cheryl Dunye, Courtney Trouble, trans film maker Amos Mac, documentarian Hilary Goldberg and others. The film premiered at the Frameline Film Festival in May 2013.
