= In This Short Life =

Independent Film

- Directed by: Britta Sjogren
- Written by: Britta Sjogren
- Produced by: Britta Sjogren
- Cinematography: Bradley Sellers
- Edited by: Britta Sjogren
- Music by: Mark Eitzel
- Release date: October 2005
- Running time: 96 mins.
- Country: United States
- Language: English

In This Short Life is a 2005 film written and directed by Britta Sjogren.

== Plot ==
Shot with non-professional actors in black-and-white, In This Short Life contemplates the margin between documentary and fiction as parts of the story are derived from the lives of the performers. The film follows four intertwined lives in Portland, Oregon, and Los Angeles: an elderly woman embarking on an affair; a mentally unstable man being evicted from his home; a frustrated actor waiting for his breakthrough; and a young female artist forced by a much-desired yet inconveniently timed pregnancy to reassess the priorities in her life.

== Cast ==
- Chris Shearer - Peter, a pushing-40 actor, waiting for a big break that is always just around the corner.
- Britta Sjogren - Heather, young female artist forced by a much-desired yet inconveniently timed pregnancy who must reassess the priorities in her life.
- Chris Sjogren - Chris, a mentally unstable man on the cusp of being evicted from his home.
- Christine Sjogren - an elderly woman who teaches piano, ambivalently embarks on an affair.

== Critical reception ==
Irina Leimbacher from the SF Cinematheque describes the film, “...A deftly structured experiment in personal narrative the gracefully, almost surreptitiously, rides between fiction and documentary.”

Holly Willis writing for LA Weekly characterizes Sjogren's work, "The stippled feathers of a dead blackbird nestled in a bed of leaves and the long, white fingers of a piano player in close-up are just two of the many evocative visual details in Britta Sjögren’s graceful second feature, In This Short Life. Shot in black-and-white 16 mm, with languid pacing and a lovely score, the film takes its title from an Emily Dickinson poem about what we can and can’t control."

In Dennis Harvey's review from Variety, he states, "Considering that most of the thesps are amateurs, they’re remarkably comfortable and convincing on camera. Making as decisive a contribution as the soft gray tones of Bradley Seller’s lensing are songs by Mark Eitzel (with and without the band American Music Club) that, like pic itself, view human relationships in terms of yearning, tenderness and scruffy humor."

== Awards ==
Sjogren received the Jury Prize for Best Feature award at the 2006 BendFilm Festival in Bend, Oregon.
