= Lenelle Moïse =

Poet, actress and playwright born in Port-au-Prince, Haiti

Lenelle Moïse (born c. 1980) is a poet, actress and playwright born in Port-au-Prince, Haiti. Currently based in the United States, she performs at colleges throughout the country, presenting work about race, gender, class, immigration and sexuality. Her spoken word CD Madivinez won the 2007 Patchwork Majority Radio Album Award for Best Solo Album. Moïse was a member of the permanent ensemble cast in the Culture Project's premiere production of Rebel Voices, a play by Rob Urbinati based on Howard Zinn and Anthony Arnove's book Voices of a People's History of the United States. In 2008, she developed a two-person vocal musical about art, infamy and race called EXPATRIATE, also at the Culture Project, in which she co-starred with Karla Cheatham-Mosley. When she was a junior at Ithaca College, Lenelle co-wrote Sexual Dependency, a feature film by Bolivian filmmaker Rodrigo Bellot who was a schoolmate at the time. The film went on to win the International Film Critics' Award at the Locarno International Film Festival in Switzerland. Moïse also wrote and starred in Mara Alper's short experimental video "To Erzulie" which premiered at the Berlin Sommerfest der Literaturen in July 2002. She has completed her own experimental shorts "Blue Passersby Eyes" and "Atlantic Soul." Her homemade music video Pied Piper was an official selection of the International Museum of Women 2007 Online Film Festival. Her essays and poems are published in a number of anthologies, most recently Word Warriors: 35 Women Leaders of the Spoken Word Revolution (Seal Press). Her debut book Haiti Glass (City Lights Publishers, April 2014), part of the Sister Spit series, is a collection of verse and prose. She experiments with collage as a form of meditative practice and nonlinear storytelling.

== Theatre ==
She earned an MFA in Playwriting from Smith College in 2004. Her two-act play Merit won the 2011–2012 Ruby Prize. In 2008, the Culture Project launched the Off-Broadway production of Expatriate, her critically acclaimed two-woman show with all-vocal music (download The New York Times review). Her other plays include: Matermorphosis, Little Griot, Spilling Venus, The Many Faces of Nia, Cornered in the Dark, and Purple. As an actress, she co-stars with Karla Mosley in Expariate and appeared in the Off-Broadway production of Rebel Voices, a play based on the book Voices of a People's History of the United States.

== Publications ==
Lenelle’s poems and essays are featured in several anthologies, including: Word Warriors: 35 Women Leaders in the Spoken Word Revolution and We Don't Need Another Wave: Dispatches from the Next Generation of Feminists. Her writing has also been published in the Platte Valley Review, Utne Reader, Make/Shift Magazine, Left Turn, Rethinking Schools, the legendary OurChart.com and Velvetpark Magazine. In 2008, she was a featured writer for The Golden Notebook Project, the Institute for the Future of the Book’s online experiment in collective close-reading.

- Haiti Glass (City Lights Publishers, 2014) ISBN 978-0-87286-614-0
