= Jo-Jo at the Gate of Lions =

- Directed by: Britta Sjogren
- Written by: Britta Sjogren
- Produced by: Britta Sjogren
- Starring: Lorie Marino; Chris Shearer; David Schultz; Beatrice Hayes
- Cinematography: Greg Watkins
- Edited by: Britta Sjogren
- Music by: Jonathan Sampson
- Release date: 1992
- Running time: 104 minutes
- Country: United States
- Language: English

Jo-Jo at the Gate of Lions is the first feature film written and directed by Britta Sjogren. It premiered in dramatic competition at the 1993 Sundance Film Festival and subsequently was featured in several film festivals. In this contemporary Joan of Arc story, a troubled young woman believes that by resisting her desires, she can prevent nuclear war.

== Plot ==
Jo-Jo is a young woman who hears voices. She meets and falls in love with Jon, an astronomer with whom she feels a strange affinity. For Jon, life is complete once he has found Jo-Jo; his destiny is achieved. However, Jo-Jo's voices tell her that she must sacrifice her desire for a simple happiness with Jon if she is to fulfill the strange and elusive destiny in store for her. She believes that by resisting what she wants, she may be able in some mysterious and mystical way to prevent nuclear war. The voices compel her to accept as part of her fate a relationship with Luke, a shadowy phone-sex entrepreneur who persuades her to come work for him. Caught between these two men, her destiny and her desires, Jo-Jo withdraws from the demands and joys of the real world. Embracing inward retreat, she gives herself over to the voices, and their message—of passion, fear, and spiritual transfiguration.

== Cast ==
- Lorie Marino as Jo-Jo
- Chris Shearer as Jon
- David Schultz as Luke
- Beatrice Hayes as Old Woman
- Rosanna as Rosanna
- Kate Griba as Katie
- Teckla Tibbs as Voice
- Caveh Zahedi as Phone Rapist

== Production ==
Jo-Jo at the Gate of Lions was a film born out of Sjogren's theoretical interests. The film was highly influenced by feminist film theory. As a modern Joan of Arc tale, Sjogren's work examines the force of contemporary female martyrdom. Jo-Jo explores the potential of the voice and voice-over to disrupt and reframe the image.

== Awards ==
After premiering in dramatic competition at the 1993 Sundance Film Festival, Jo-Jo at the Gate of Lions played a number of film festivals garnering critical reception and awards. Jo-Jo won Best First Feature at the Créteil International Women's Film Festival in Créteil, France and Best Narrative Film at the Atlanta Film Festival while also being featured in the Torino Festival and the Helsinki International Festival.
