= Nicole Georges =

American illustrator, writer, zinester, podcaster, and educator

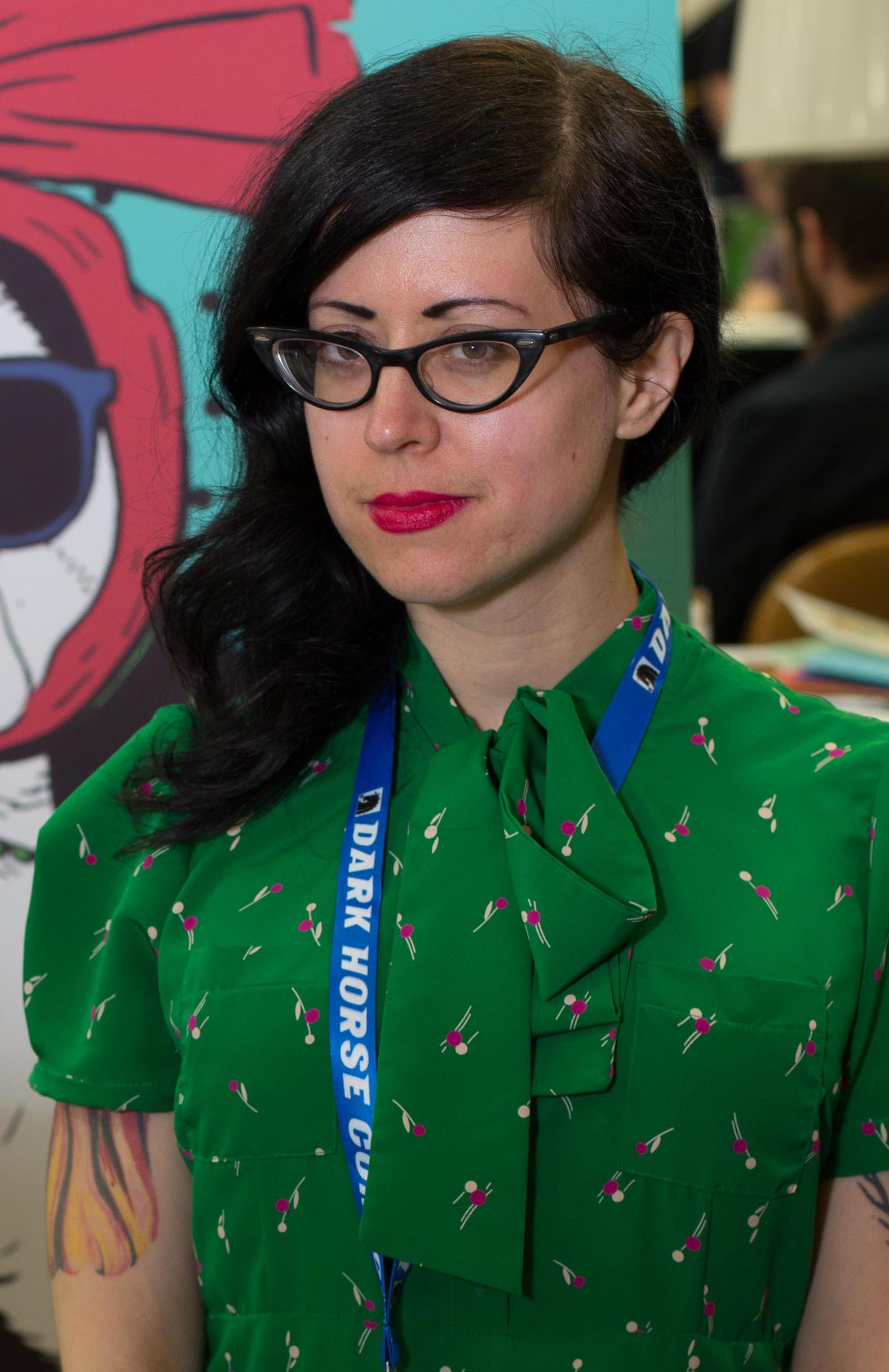
- Georges at Stumptown Comics Fest 2013
- Born: December 10, 1981 (age 44) Kansas
- Areas: zinester, cartoonist, author, instructor
- Notable works: Invincible Summer; Calling Dr. Laura; Fetch: How a Bad Dog Brought Me Home
- Spouse: Kaia Wilson (m. 2020)

Nicole J. Georges (born December 10, 1981 in Kansas) is an American illustrator, writer, zinester, podcaster, and educator. She is well known for authoring the autobiographical comic zine Invincible Summer, whose individual issues have been collected into two anthologies published by Tugboat Press and Microcosm Publishing. Some of her other notable works include the graphic memoirs Calling Dr. Laura and Fetch: How a Bad Dog Brought Me Home. In addition to this, Georges creates comics and teaches others how to make them, produces the Podcast Sagittarian Matters, and illustrates portraits of animals. She currently divides her time between Los Angeles, California and Portland, Oregon.

== Notable works ==
=== Zines and comics ===
Georges has been creating Invincible Summer since 2000, and has published 23 issues of the zine. It is an autobiographical diary comic that narrates the events of the period of her life following her move from Kansas to Portland at age 19. The work is largely a product of the excitement the artist felt toward multiple aspects of her new surroundings, from the "zine scene" the city offered to the "vegan food" it introduced her to. In the second edition of the first volume, Georges writes that the original name of the zine was "My Tooth Has Teeth," however, it was given its current name after the author was inspired by an Albert Camus quote that appeared on a bookmark she found in a thrift shop. Georges also notes that in Invincible Summer, she can see herself "growing up," and can "trace" different moments in her life as she was "figuring out how to live a little better all the time." Invincible Summer has a queer and feminist slant, and draws upon a variety of topics, some of which include a connection to animals, the importance of coffee intake, relationships with friends, family, and romantic interests, navigating the waters of creative pursuits, vegan cooking and recipes, and more.

The first eight issues of Invincible Summer were collected by Tugboat Press in 2004, with the addition of a second volume (issues 9-14) published in 2008 by Microcosm Publishing.

The artist also co-edited the zine Coffeeshop Crushes alongside Jon Van Oast. The publication has been described as a comical compilation of tales of romantic interactions that occur between servers and customers in coffee shops.

Georges is also a contributor to the zine Tell It Like It Tiz, a collection of stories, illustrations, and advice created as a result of the artist's work with senior citizens at the Marie Smith Center in Portland, Oregon.

Georges also creates diary comics and produces comic series. One such series, which Georges still continues to work on, is called Anonymous Fuzzball and depicts animals in group therapy settings, "delivering their own experience, strength, and hope."

=== Graphic novels ===
In January 2013, Georges' graphic memoir, Calling Dr. Laura, was released by Mariner Books. The novel depicts the events following the author's visit to a palm reader at age twenty-three, where she is told by the psychic there that her father is not actually dead like her family claimed years ago. In light of this news, the author is "sent into a tailspin about her identity," and endeavors to find out the truth, recounting the occurrences of her childhood and grappling with feelings of uncertainty. Eventually, Georges' sister reveals that her real father is still alive, but has been kept secret by other members of her family. At the same time, the author is navigating the waters of a new romance, and finds her only companion is a chicken named Mabel, so she decides to call a radio show host (Dr. Laura Schlessinger) for guidance. Calling Dr. Laura explores the themes of truth, secrecy, and family dynamics and is described as a "part coming-of-age story," "part coming-out story."

In July 2017, Georges released Fetch, a graphic memoir that focuses on the relationship between the author and her dog. Originally purchased by a sixteen-year-old Georges as a gift for her then-boyfriend Tom, Beija is a "dysfunctional shar-pei/corgi mix," that proves to be the "one constant" in the author's life for the next sixteen years. The work follows the lives and adventures of the steadfast companions as they age, encounter new experiences and individuals, and face numerous challenges alongside one another.

=== Collaborations ===
Georges' illustrations have been found in The Rock n Roll Camp for Girls (Chronicle Books), Food & Booze (Tin House Press), Baby Remember My Name (Carroll & Graf), It's So You (Seal Press), and Bitch magazine.

=== Additional creative projects ===
Georges also creates illustrations, portraits, calendars, and prints of animals. Primarily featuring cats and dogs, these works are both displayed and sold on her website and others.

Additionally, Georges has created and produced over 130 episodes of her podcast, Sagittarian Matters. The podcast is hosted by Georges and frequently welcomes guest interviews and co-hosts. The episodes are themed according to a wide variety of topics, with veganism, queer identity, feminism, pets, and cartooning remaining some of the most prevalent.

=== Influences and impact ===
Additionally, in Invincible Summer, Georges cites Lynda Barry and Lisa Carver as some of her favorite artists and authors.

Regarding her focus on illustrating animals, Georges has elaborated on the significant roles they have played as steadfast companions throughout her life. Consequently, much of her work seeks to reflect "the emotional life of animals," and one of her primary goals is to "help animals" through her art.

The creator emphasizes the importance of persistence and creating art "because you love it."

== Teaching and extracurricular work ==
=== Teaching ===
Georges has been instructing others on creating zines, making comics, and self-publishing for more than a decade. She began teaching comic creation to homeless youth, but has since provided guidance to a variety of groups of individuals, from elementary schoolers to senior citizens. She has stated that through teaching, she aims to enable others to "tell stories through pictures"

She was also the 2016/2017 Donaldson Writer in Residency at the College of William & Mary in Virginia.

=== Involvement ===
Moreover, Georges is a co-founder of the Portland Zine Symposium, and an organizer of the Midwest Underground Media Symposium.

Furthermore, she has been involved with Portland's Independent Resource Center (IPRC), Writers In The Schools, The Right Brain Initiative, and Young Audiences of Oregon. She has also been volunteering with the Portland Rock and Roll Camp for Girls since its inception in 2001, and taught Homorobics, a punk exercise class, from 2008 to 2009.

=== Tours ===
In 2007, Georges traveled the country with Sister Spit: The Next Generation alongside Michelle Tea, Eileen Myles and Cristy Road, and toured with them again in 2010. She has also toured with Cassie J. Sneider, Microcosm Publishing, Fact or Fiction, and the Rock and Roll Camp for Girls (with Katy Davidson). Georges continues to tour today.

== Critical reception ==
Georges was listed one of "Five Writers To Watch Out For" by the Lambda Literary Foundation, one of ten "Cartoonists Who Could Be the Next Dan Clowes" by Flavorwire, and one of eight "Worthy Successors to Alison Bechdel" by Flavorwire. Georges was named "Miss Specs Appeal 2006" by the zine Hey Four Eyes. In 2012, she also won the Sunburst Award for Excellence in Arts Education.

Georges' graphic novel Calling Dr. Laura won the Lambda Literary Award for LGBT Graphic Novel at the 26th Lambda Literary Awards in 2014. The work was also featured in Vanity Fair, USA Today, and named one of the "Best Books of Summer 2013" by Jezebel.com.

Moreover, the French translation of Calling Dr. Laura ("Allo, Dr. Laura? ") was an official selection at the 2016 Angouleme International Comics Festival.

One of the author's other notable works, Fetch: How a Bad Dog Brought Me Home, was a Lambda Literary Award finalist, and the winner of two Oregon Book Awards for Best Graphic Novel and Reader's Choice.

== Personal life ==
Georges is queer and made a video of herself discussing her sexuality with her mother, with plans to publish it on YouTube.

According to the artist, some of her hobbies include singing, karaoke, cooking and sewing.

Notably, Georges also maintains that feminist causes are important to her. Not only has she stated that she is a proponent of "feminist voices and women supporting each other," but she also asserts that it is necessary to encourage people "to amplify their voices through self publishing, art, and music."

The artist has also been vegan since 1997, after making a New Year's Resolution to practice the lifestyle. As Georges has made known, she has always had an affinity for animals and desired to help them whenever possible. For her, veganism provides a "small, everyday way" to do so.

In October 2020, Georges married musician Kaia Wilson, the singer of queercore band Team Dresch. The two met at a karaoke night in 2006 at the Alibi Tiki Lounge in Portland.
