= Redemption Trail =

- Directed by: Britta Sjogren
- Written by: Britta Sjogren
- Produced by: Britta Sjogren; Soumyaa Kapil Behrens
- Starring: Lily Rabe; LisaGay Hamilton; Jake Weber; Hamish Linklater
- Cinematography: Bradley Sellers
- Edited by: Christopher Münch; Michael Goodier
- Music by: Mark Orton
- Release date: October 2013 (Mill Valley)
- Running time: 90 minutes
- Country: United States
- Language: English

Redemption Trail is a 2013 American drama film written and directed by Britta Sjogren and starring Lily Rabe, LisaGay Hamilton, Jake Weber and Hamish Linklater.

== Plot ==
Two strong, yet deeply troubled women - struggling with political and personal trauma - try to escape pasts that haunts them. Tess, the daughter of a murdered Black Panther, lives off the grid on a Sonoma vineyard, detached from any sort of human connection. Her life of solitude is shattered when she gives reluctant shelter to a desperate young woman, Anna. An unlikely companionship forms, where other close relationships have failed. But the very difference between the two women opens them up to a new vision of themselves, not only as survivors, but as heroes. Bravely reclaiming independence, and their personal life, they charge forward, towards an unknown, transformative future.

== Cast ==
- Lily Rabe as Anna
- LisaGay Hamilton as Tess
- Hamish Linklater as David
- Jake Weber as John
- Asta Sjogren-Uyehara as Ruby
- Juliette Stubbs as Juliet
- Stephanie Diaz as Cecelia
- Beth Lisick as Larraine

== Production ==
The film's production took place over the summer of 2011 in the Stubbs Vineyard, Marin County, Petaluma and Oakland, California.

== Release ==
The film had its world premiere at the Mill Valley Film Festival in October 2013, winning the audience award.
