= Independent Publishing Resource Center =

Resource centre

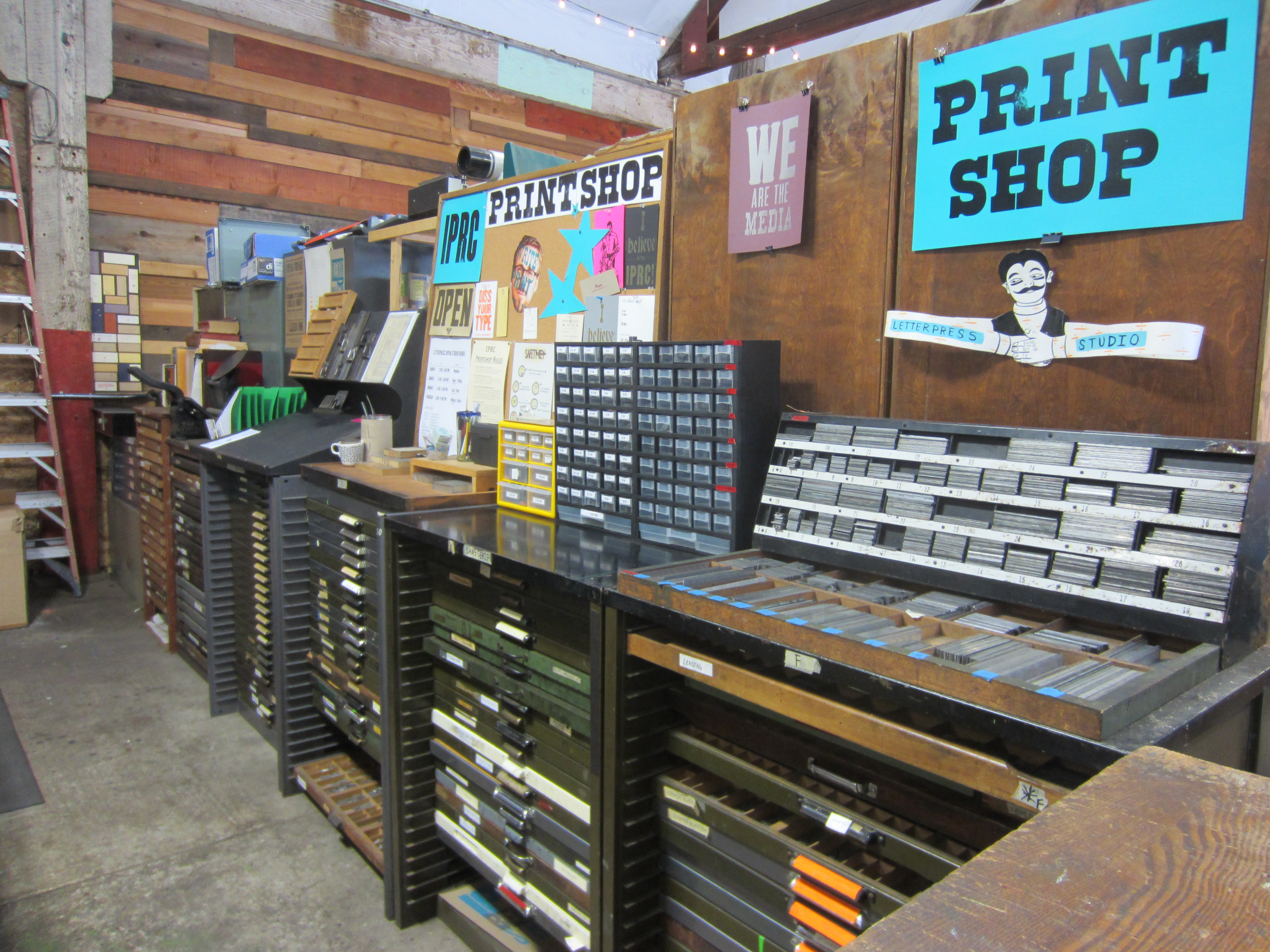
- Interior in 2014

- Location within Portland, Oregon
- Formation: 1998; 28 years ago
- Founders: Chloe Eudaly; Rebecca Gilbert
- Founded at: Portland, Oregon
- Headquarters: 318 Southeast Main Street
- Location: Portland, Oregon, U.S.
- Coordinates: 45.5135°N 122.66234°W
- Members: 6,000 (2016)
- Website: iprc.org

The Independent Publishing Resource Center (IPRC) is a resource center based in Portland, Oregon that provides access to tools for the creation of books, prints, posters, zines, and comics. The studios include a computer lab and general workspace, screen printing, letterpress printing, risograph printing, and a zine library. The center was founded in 1998 by Chloe Eudaly, owner of Reading Frenzy and Show & Tell Press, and Rebecca Gilbert, worker-owner at Stumptown Printers.

== Description ==
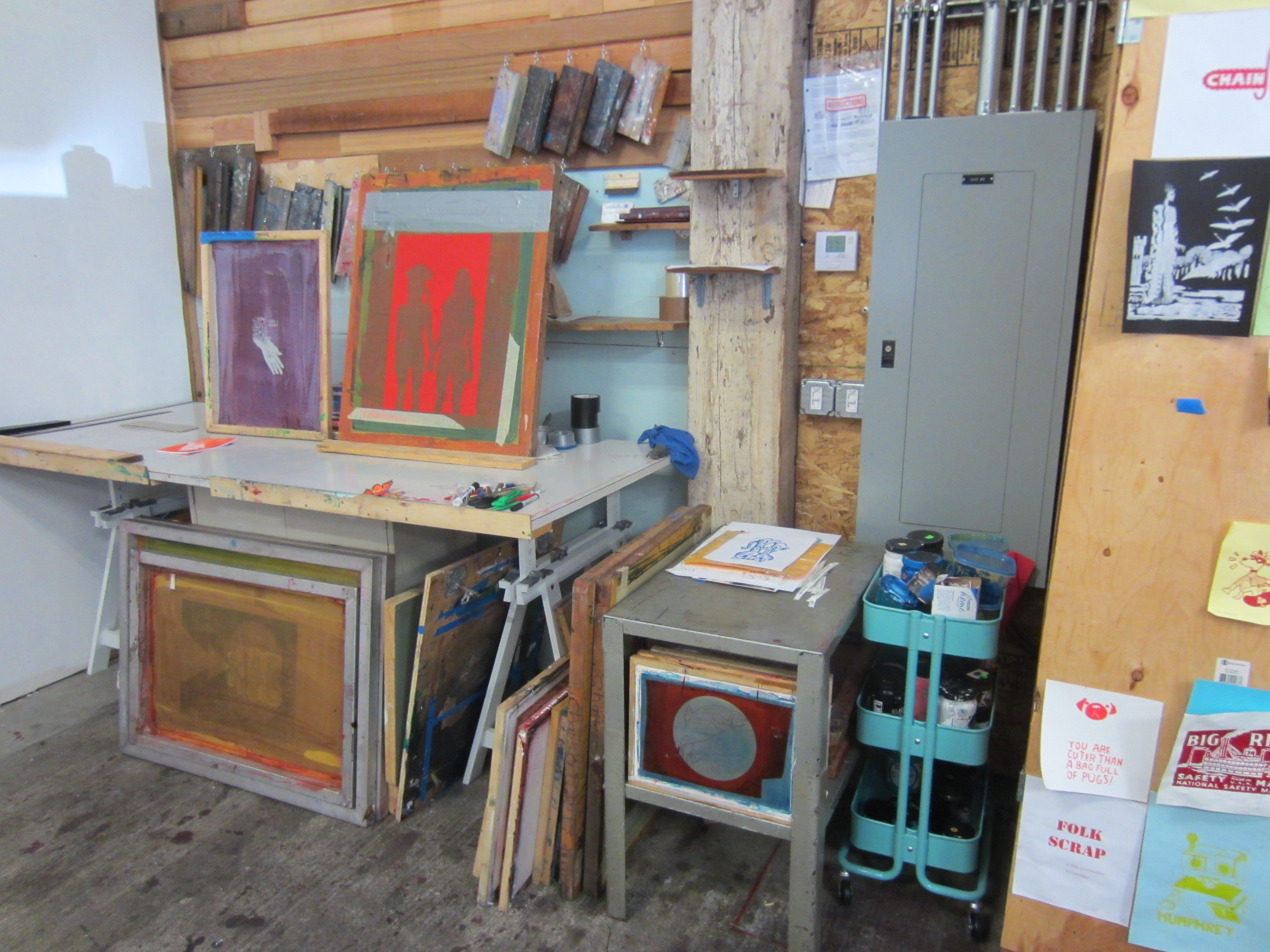
Interior view in 2014

IPRC is an Oregon nonprofit organization offering education, outreach, and a library of more than 9,000 catalogued zines from around the world. The library has the third largest zine collection in the United States, as of 2016. Willamette Week has described the center as an "accessible, community-centric space" offering classes and tools. Workshops include bookbinding, graphic and web design, letterpress printing, and self-publishing, as of 2010.

The center's Youth Sunday program was created in 1998. As of 2015, the program occurs each Sunday, "when employees on-site assist youths in creating their own print media. The program aims to help novices understand the fine points of the growing field of independent publishing." The center hosted an annual print show and sale, as of 2019.

== History ==
IPRC was established in 1998. The organization operated on Portland's west side for its first fifteen years, above the Reading Frenzy at 921 Southwest Oak Street, near Powell's Books. The center relocated to a larger space at 1001 Southeast Division Street in 2012. IPRC had approximately 6,000 members, as of mid 2016.

IPRC faced a 300 percent rent increase when the April 2017 lease expired, causing the center to relocate to its current location in the Gardeners and Ranchers building. The organization crowdsourced more than $20,000 to help fund the new space. The IPRC moved to 318 SE Main Street in 2017.

=== Leadership ===
Portland City Commissioner Chloe Eudaly served as the director of the IPRC before running for office in 2016. Former board president Brian Tibbetts was serving as interim executive director following A.M. O'Malley's departure, as of August 2017. Alley Pezanoski-Browne became the executive director in 2018, with Harper Quinn as the program director.

Nicole Georges worked for IPRC for fourteen years, initially as an outreach coordinator and later as the center's first comic book instructor.

IPRC has organized the Letterpress Print Fair; in 2019, the center hosted an Open House as part of Design Week Portland.

In September 2022, the IPRC announced that it would be adopting a nonhierarchical leadership collective. The organization has been led by four co-leaders since January 2023.

== See also ==
- Culture of Portland, Oregon
- Portland Zine Symposium
