= Jonathan David Katz =

American art historian, activist and educator

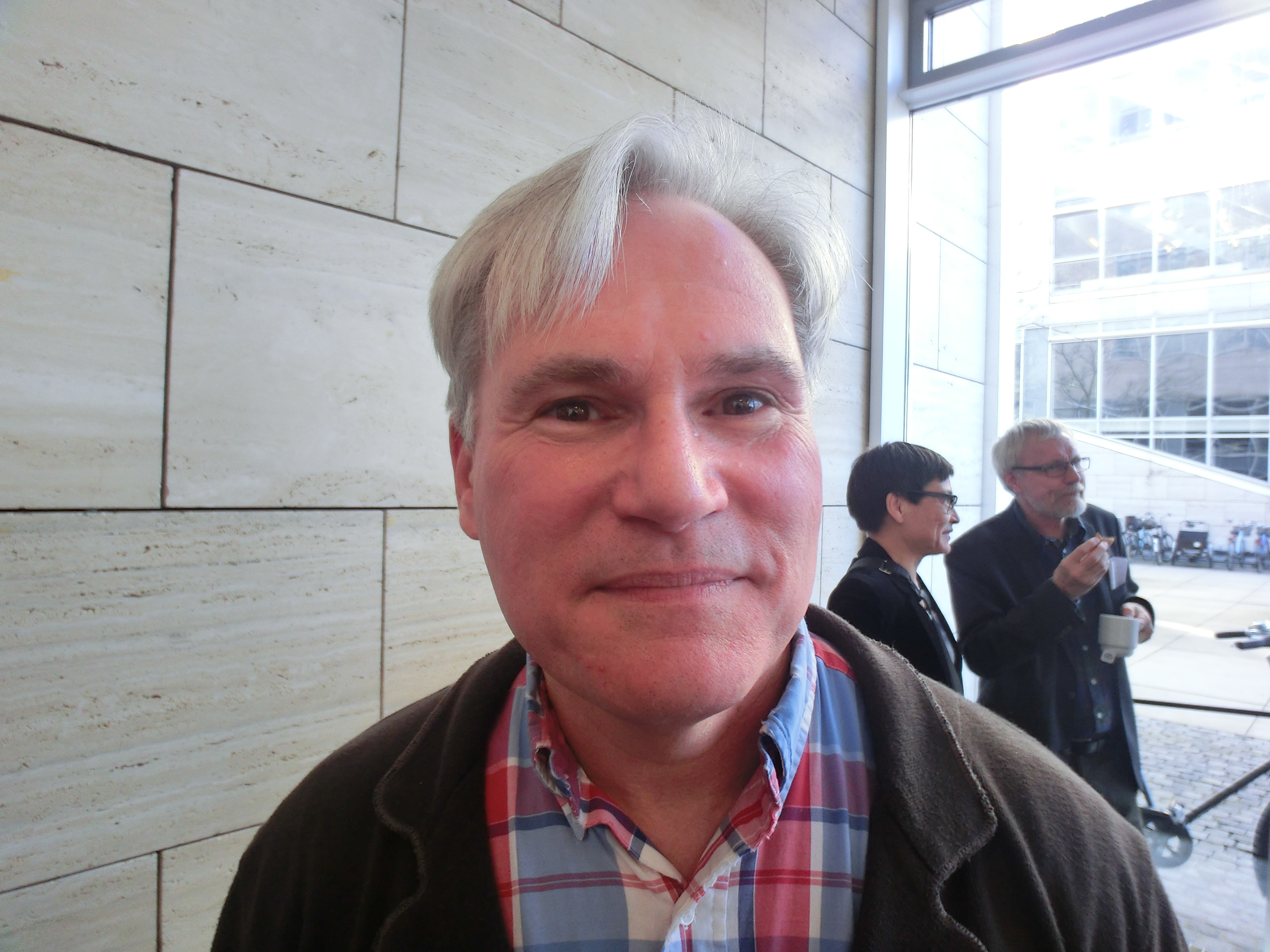
- Katz in 2015
- Born: 1958 (age 67–68); St. Louis, Missouri, US
- Occupations: Educator, writer, art historian
- Writing career
- Genres: Queer studies, art history
- Subjects: Post war and contemporary cultural history

Jonathan David Katz (born 1958) is an American activist, art historian, educator and writer. He is currently Associate Professor of Practice in Art History and Gender, Sexuality & Women's Studies at the University of Pennsylvania.

== Biography ==
Katz is a founding figure in queer art history, responsible for the very first queer scholarship on a number of artists beginning in the early 1990s. His scholarship spans a period from the late 20th-century to the present, with an emphasis on the US, but with serious attention to Europe, Latin America and Asia as well. He has written extensively about gender, sexuality and desire, producing some of the key theoretical work in queer studies in the visual arts. Katz has curated more queer art exhibitions than anyone else in the world.

He is also the former executive coordinator of the Larry Kramer Initiative for Lesbian and Gay Studies at Yale University. He is a former chair of the Department of Lesbian and Gay studies at the City College of San Francisco, and was the first tenured faculty in gay and lesbian studies in the United States. Katz was an associate professor in the Art History Department at the State University of New York at Stony Brook, where he also taught queer studies. He received his Ph.D. from Northwestern University in 1996.

Katz is the founder of the Harvey Milk Institute, the largest queer studies institute in the world, and the Queer Caucus for Art of the College Art Association.

Katz co-founded Queer Nation San Francisco. He has made scholarly contributions to queer studies the focus of his professional career. He was the first artistic director of the National Queer Arts Festival in San Francisco and has published widely in the United States and Europe.

His forthcoming book, The Homosexualization of American Art: Jasper Johns, Robert Rauschenberg and the Collective Closet, will be published by the University of Chicago Press. An internationally recognized expert in queer postwar American art, Katz has recently published "Jasper Johns' Alley Oop: On Comic Strips and Camouflage" in Schwule Bildwelten im 20. Jahrhundert, edited by Thomas Roeske, and "The Silent Camp: Queer Resistance and the Rise of Pop Art," in Plop! Goes the World, edited by Serge Guilbaut. In 1995, Katz was kicked out of Rauschenberg conference at the Guggenheim for mentioning Rauschenberg's relationship with Johns.

Katz was co-curator with David C. Ward and Jenn Sichel of the exhibition "Hide/Seek: Difference and Desire in American Portraiture" at the National Portrait Gallery, Washington. This was the first major museum exploration of the impact of same-sex desire in the creation of modern American portraiture. David Wojnarowicz's video A Fire in My Belly was removed from the exhibition on November 30, 2010, causing controversy. Katz was not consulted before the work's removal.

His recent Chicago About Face: Stonewall, Revolt and New Queer Art, at 500 works the largest queer exhibition yet mounted, was one of the rare art shows that featured a majority of artists who were neither male nor white, and was favorably reviewed on the front-page art section of The New York Times.

== Works ==
- "Re-viewing the Field: Queer Studies in Art History", Art History, 1999
- "John Cage's Queer Silence or How to Avoid Making Matters Worse", GLQ, Duke University Press, April, 1999. Reprinted in Here Comes Everybody: The Music Poetry and Art of John Cage, ed. David Bernstein, Chicago: University of Chicago Press, 1999
- "Performative Silence and the Politics of Passivity," in Making a Scene, ed. Henry Rogers, Birmingham University Press, 1999
- "Dismembership: Jasper Johns and the Body Politic", Performing the Body/Performing the Text, eds. Amelia Jones and Andrew Stephenson, New York: Routledge Press, 1999
- Difference/Indifference: Musings on Duchamp and Cage, coauthored with Moira Roth, New York: Gordon and Breach, 1998
- "Lovers and Divers: Picturing a Partnership in Rauschenberg and Johns", Frauen/Kunst/Wissenschaft, Berlin, June 1998
- "Rauschenberg and the Guggenheim", Out Magazine, April 1998
- "Rauschenberg's Honeymoon", Art & Text, no. 16 (May–July), 1998

== See also ==
- David C. Ward, an American historian, published poet and author
- Jonathan Ned Katz (born 1938), historian of human sexuality
- Queer studies
- Queer theory
