= A Small Domain =

- Directed by: Britta Sjogren
- Written by: Britta Sjogren
- Produced by: Britta Sjogren; Andrea Sperling
- Starring: Ana Gasteyer
- Cinematography: Greg Watkins
- Edited by: Dody Dorn; Britta Sjogren
- Music by: Blake Leyh
- Release date: January 1996
- Running time: 18 mins.
- Country: United States
- Language: English

A Small Domain is a 1996 short film written and directed by Britta Sjogren. It premiered at the 1996 Sundance Film Festival, where it won the Grand Jury Prize for Best Short Film, and subsequently won several festival awards during 1996 and 1997. Sjogren was inspired by her friendship with actress Beatrice Hayes and Haye's relationship with her late husband. Hayes took the role of the character based on her.

== Plot ==
An elderly woman prepares to celebrate the anniversary of her marriage to her late husband. She steals what she needs and ends up taking home a baby that she finds at a bus stop.

== Cast ==
- Ana Gasteyer as Mother
- Beatrice Hayes as Woman
- Rebecca Guadalupe Kuntz as Baby
- Lance Sjogren as Clerk
- Emily Sperling as Little Girl

== Awards ==
In 1996, A Small Domain won the Short Filmmaking Award at the Sundance Film Festival, the Special Jury Award at the USA Film Festival and Special Recognition at Aspen Shortsfest. In 1997 it won the SXSW Competition Award at the SXSW Film Festival, the Special Jury Artistic Merit Award at the Cinequest San Jose Film Festival and the North Carolina Filmmaker Award at the Charlotte Film & Video Festival.
