= Tara Jepsen =

American actress

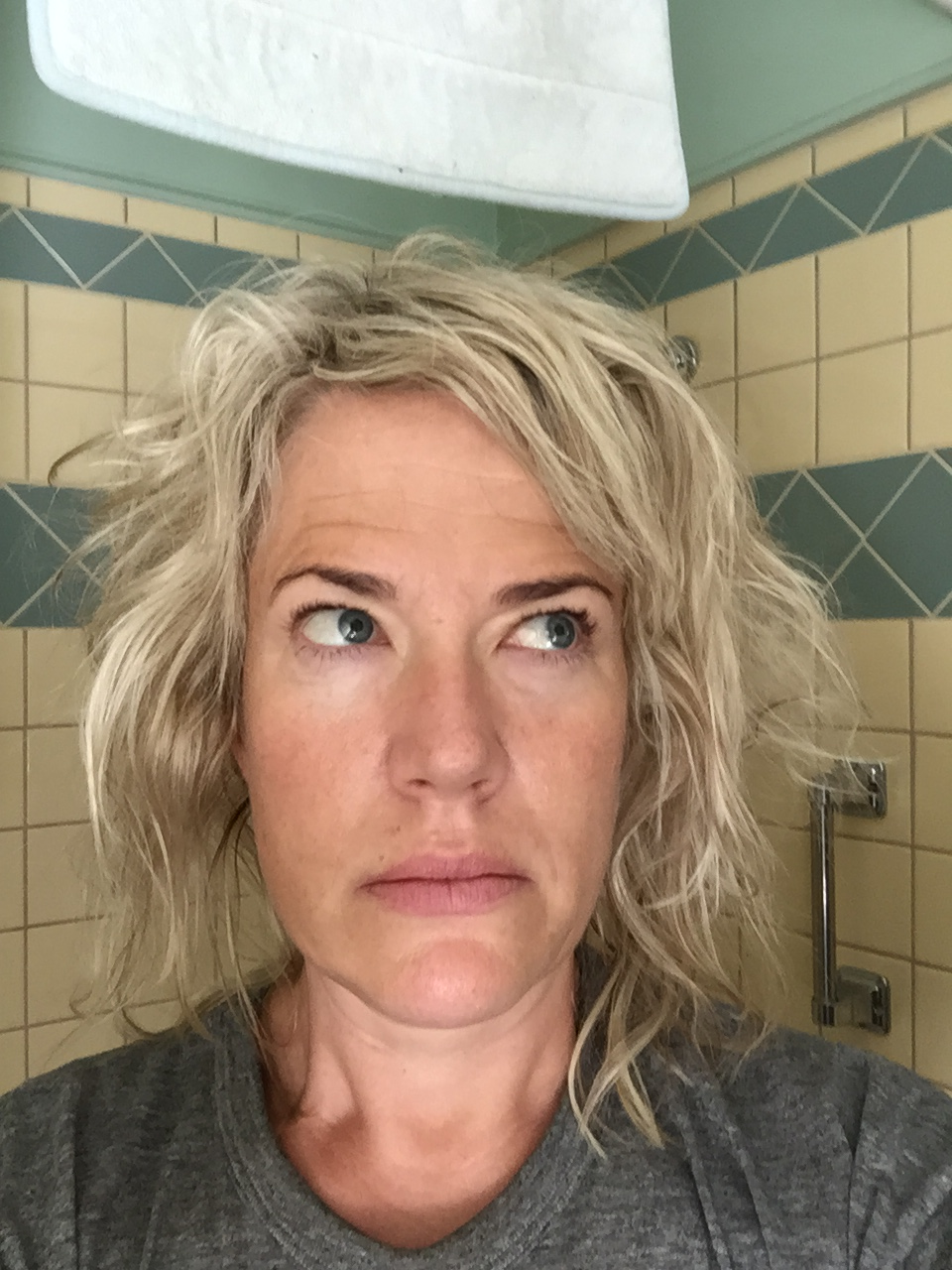
- Jepsen at a JOSH party
- Website: tarajepsen.com

Tara Jepsen is a writer and an actor based in Los Angeles, California.

== Biography ==
Since 1999, Tara Jepsen has written and performed sketch comedy alongside Beth Lisick, performing in venues and festivals across the United States. The pair wrote and acted in an original web series entitled "Rods and Cones", which was named one of Indiewire's 25 Best Series/Creators of 2014.

Jepsen began her film career in 2011, when appearing in "Sinking State"(2011, dir. Frazer Bradshaw). Since then, she has appeared in short films. Jepsen is currently featured on the web series The Skinny, and holds a featured role in season two of Transparent, Amazon's Emmy-winning series.

Jepsen's first novel, Like a Dog, was published in 2019 by City Lights Publishers. She also has been published in The Believer, xojane.com, and by SF Weekly, among others.

Jepsen created a skateboard deck company with Miriam Klein Stahl called Pave the Way providing custom LGBTQI decks.
