= National Queer Arts Festival =

Annual queer festival in San Francisco

National Queer Arts Festival (NQAF) is an annual queer festival in San Francisco organized by the Queer Cultural Center and established in 1998 to coincide with Pride Month.

Other organisations which have assisted over the years include the Harvey Milk Institute, Mission Cultural Center for Latino Arts and the Center for African and African American Art & Culture.

Jonathan David Katz is the founding artist director of the festival.

Since 1998, NQAF has presented more than 800 different events that have featured more than 2,300 LGBTQ+ artists including Bill T. Jones, Alice Walker, Robert Rauschenberg, Meredith Monk, Adrienne Rich, Marga Gomez, Justin Chin, Thom Gunn, Cherríe Moraga and Dorothy Allison. NQAF is the largest queer arts festival in North America.

== Festivals ==
1. 1998
2. June 1, 1999
3. June 1-July 4. 2000
4. June 1-July 4, 2001
5. June 1-July 7
6. May 31- June 29, 2003.
7. June 3–27, 2004.
8. June 1–30
9. 2006, June 1–30
10. 2007, May 26- June 30
11. 2008, June 1–30
12. 2009, May 31 – July 11
