= Harvey Milk Institute =

Queer studies institute in San Francisco

Harvey Milk Institute, located in San Francisco, California, was the largest queer studies institute in the world, and was founded by Jonathan David Katz in 1995. It was named in honor of Harvey Milk, an American politician and gay rights activist.

The Institute strived to create an educational home for the San Francisco Bay Area's gay and lesbian, bisexual and transgender communities, who felt that their needs and interests were ignored or marginalised by schools of higher education. Courses offered by the Institute included Queering Culture, Prostitution 101, Lesbian and Gay Parenting and Queer Consciousness.

== See also ==
- National Queer Arts Festival
- Hetrick-Martin Institute
