= Britta Sjogren =

American filmmaker and academic (b. 1958)

- Born: December 21, 1958 (age 66); Portland, Oregon
- Occupations: Independent film director; film theorist

Britta H. Sjogren (born December 21, 1958) is an independent filmmaker and academic.

== Biography ==
Britta Sjogren was born in Portland, Oregon and attended University of California, Berkeley for her undergraduate and University of California, Los Angeles, where she earned degrees in both a Master of Fine Arts in film production and a PhD in critical theory. Her films have received awards from a number of independent film circuits including Sundance Film Festival, SXSW, Dallas International Film Festival, Aspen Shortsfest and special showcases at Créteil International Women's Film Festival and the Locarno International Film Festival.

Sjogren is a recipient of a Guggenheim Fellowship, the American Film Institute Independent Filmmaker grant and the Cinereach award for Best Screenplay - Best Minority Protagonist, among other honors. She has programmed film series for the Berkeley Art Museum and Pacific Film Archive and the Créteil International Women's Film Festival. Furthermore, Sjogren continues her academic work as a professor of Cinema at San Francisco State University. As the Director of Cinema Department at San Francisco State University from 2015-2019, she launched a significant curricular initiative to spotlight the contributions of women in film and oversaw capital improvements, including the renovation of the renowned Coppola Theater. Additionally, Sjogren is the author of Into the Vortex: Female Voice and Paradox in Film a scholarly book that focuses on female subjectivity, feminine voice and sound in film through the psychoanalytic, narratological and discursive contradictions of 1940s film.

As a filmmaker, her films are unorthodox narratives that center upon the subjective experience of women. Jo-Jo at the Gate of Lions, Sjogren's modern Joan-of-Arc tale, premiered at competition at Sundance Film Festival and screened at Berkeley Art Museum and Pacific Film Archive. Her 1996 work, A Small Domain, won the Grand Jury Prize at Sundance Film Festival for Best Short Film and SXSW Competition Award at the SXSW Film Festival in addition to other awards. Sjogren's latest film, Redemption Trail is a contemporary feminist Western set in Marin and Oakland. This film premiered at the Mill Valley Film Festival, winning the audience award. She co-founded the production company Dire Wolf in 2007.

== Filmography ==
Jo-Jo at the Gate of Lions (1992)
A Small Domain (1996)
In This Short Life (2005)
Redemption Trail (2013)

== Exhibition ==
In the Fall of 2021, Sjogren's work was featured in an exhibition at Stanislaus State, in which her filmography, photography, and career were highlighted. A catalogue accompanied the exhibit titled, "Britta Sjogren - The Gaze Returned".
