= Cristy Road =

Cuban-American artist and musician

Cristy C. Road
- Born: Cristina Carrera; 1982 (age 43–44); Miami, Florida, United States
- Education: Fashion Institute of Technology
- Occupations: Artist; author; musician
- Writing career
- Genres: comics, punk, memoir, zine, illustration
- Notable works: Indestructible, Bad Habits, Next World Tarot
- Website: croadcore.org

Cristina Carrera, otherwise known as Cristy C. Road (born May 26, 1982) is a Cuban-American illustrator, graphic novelist, and punk rock musician whose posters, music, and autobiographical works explore themes of feminism, queer culture, and social justice. She primarily works as an illustrator and graphic novelist, but also published a long-running zine about punk music and her life as a queer Latina. She performed on the Sister Spit roadshow in 2007, 2009, and 2013 and was the lead vocalist and guitarist for the queercore/pop-punk band, The Homewreckers. She currently sings vocals and plays guitar in Choked Up. She has published three books and one collection of postcards, as well as numerous concert posters, protest flyers, book covers, and logos. Road has worked as a professor at the Center for Documentary Studies at Duke University.

== Early work and influences ==
Road's queer and Cuban-American identity are central to both her art and her political refusal to assimilate into mainstream or straight culture, and as an emerging artist she was inspired by the "queer punk scene in San Francisco/Oakland, CA." From 1997 through 2004, she published the zine Greenzine, which started as a fanzine about the band Green Day and eventually focused more on Road's identity, politics, and ideas. Her early artistic influences included John Kricfalusi of Ren and Stimpy, Frida Kahlo, Diego Rivera, and Kathe Kollowitz.

== Music ==
From 2008 to 2017, Road played guitar and sung in queercore pop punk Brooklyn band The Homewreckers. Road currently sings vocals and plays guitar in pop-punk band Choked Up. In 2021, Choked Up announced they signed to Don Giovanni Records.

== Next World Tarot ==
In 2017, Road successfully raised nearly $30,000 on Kickstarter to fund the Next World Tarot. The hand-illustrated tarot deck features colorful portraits of queer and POC bodies in a post-apocalyptic existence. While producing the deck, Road also earned her master's degree in fine art illustration at Fashion Institute of Technology, where she focused her thesis on the history of tarot.

== Critical acclaim ==
Bitch magazine listed Road as a "Bitchlist" pick in 2005. Curve said of Indestructible: "So powerful is Road's candid portrayal of growing pains, it provides the perfect comfort for angsty, self-loathing youth and sends older readers back down memory lane through their own adventures and mishaps of young adulthood." Road's memoir Bad Habits was nominated for a LAMBDA Literary Award. In 2012, Flavorwire named Road one of 50 "up and coming New York culture makers to watch in 2013," describing her as "a fixture in feminist, LGBT, and punk zinester circles."

== Published work ==
Bibliography adapted from Road's website.

Books:

- Sink or Burn (2026) ISBN 978-1-967182-03-9
- Indestructible (2006) ISBN 9780977055777
- Distance Makes the Heart Grow Sick (Microcosm, 2008) ISBN 9780978866518
- Bad Habits: A Love Story (Soft Skull Press, 2008) ISBN 9781593762155
- Spit and Passion (Feminist Press, 2012) ISBN 9781558618077

Works included in:

- Justseeds' collection Celebrate People's History: The Poster Book of Resistance and Revolution (2019)
- We Don't Need Another Wave: Dispatches from the Next Generation of Feminists (2006)
- Baby Remember My Name (2006)
- Live Through This (2008)
- Reproduce and Revolt (2008)
- Best Erotic Comics 2009 (2009)
- SIDE B: A Music Lover's Anthology (2009)
