= Queer Cultural Center =

Organization in San Francisco, California

Queer Cultural Center is a San Francisco "community building" organization to promote development of San Francisco's LGBT community. It was established in 1993.

It is also known as the San Francisco Lesbian and Gay Center for Art and Culture.

== Directors ==
The original directors were: Freddie Niem, Osa Hidalgo-de la Riva, Rudy Lemcke, Lenore Chinn, Greg Day, Pam Peniston, Adrienne Fuzee, Jeff Jones, Blackberri and Carol Stuart. In August 2020, Queer Cultural Center welcomed Natalia M. Vigil as their first full-time Executive Director.

== Programs ==
The most prominent program of the Center is the annual National Queer Arts Festival, established in 1998.

In 2002, they opened an exhibition of works of Robert Rauschenberg, with the intention of having three exhibitions each year of internationally and nationally recognized artists who "examine queer issues in their work".

In 2007, they partnered with the San Francisco LGBT Community Center to host an art exhibition and event commemorating World AIDS Day.

== See also ==
- Trans March
