= Justin Vivian Bond =

American singer (born 1963)

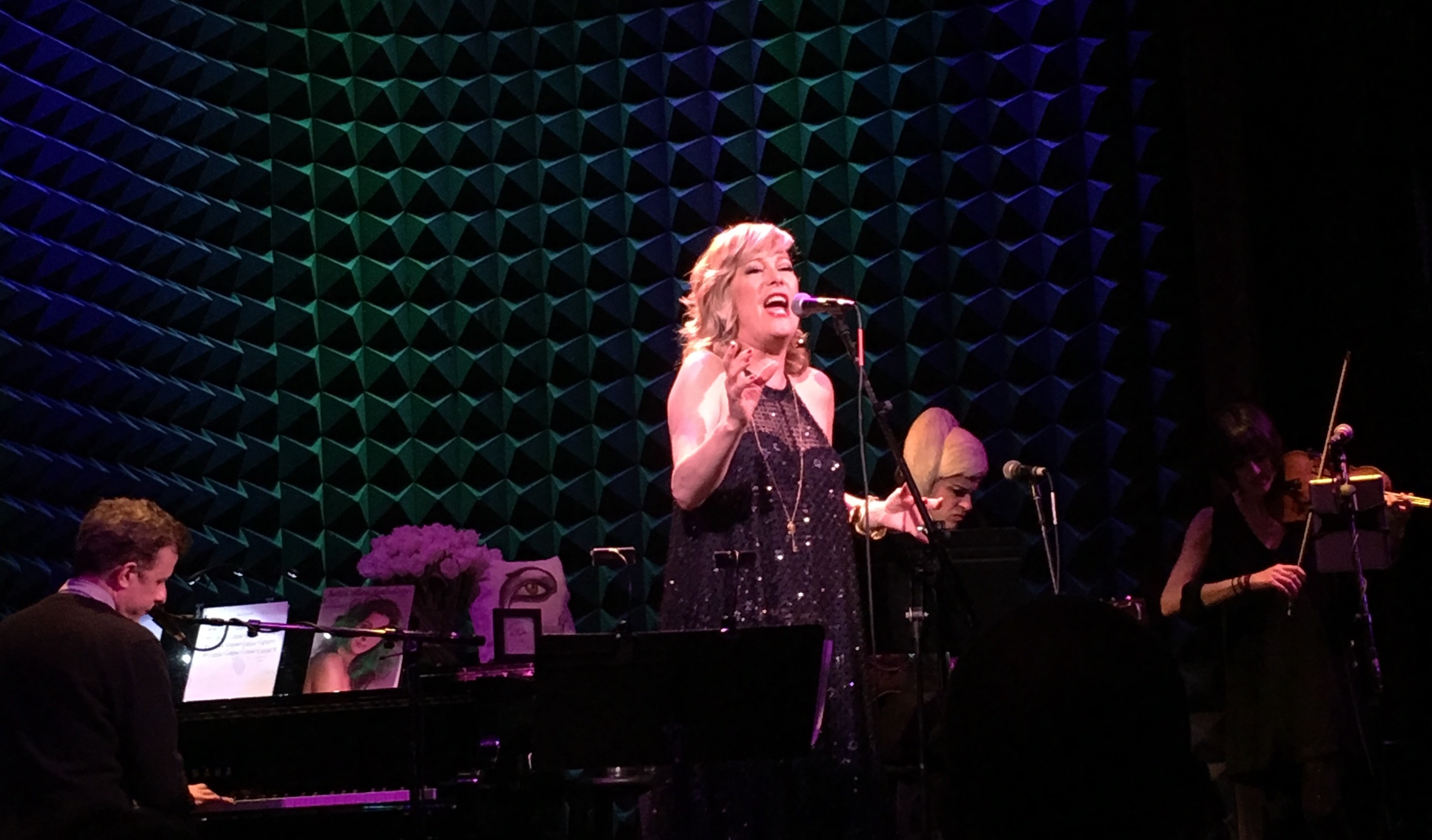
- Bond performing in 2019 at Joe's Pub in New York City

Background information
- Born: May 9, 1963 (age 63); Hagerstown, Maryland, U.S.
- Genres: Alternative, cabaret
- Occupations: Singer-songwriter, actor
- Years active: 1989–present
- Website: justinbond.com

Justin Vivian Bond (born May 9, 1963) is an American singer-songwriter and actor, who is transgender. Described as "the best cabaret artist of [their] generation" and a "tornado of art and activism", they (Note: Bond uses the neopronoun v/v's/vself as personal pronouns. This article uses they/them for simplicity and understanding.) first achieved prominence under the pseudonym of Kiki DuRane in the stage duo Kiki and Herb, an act born out of a collaboration with long-time co-star Kenny Mellman. With a musical voice self-described as "kind of woody and full with a lot of vibration", Bond is a Tony-nominated (2007) performer who has received GLAAD (2000), Obie (2001), Bessie (2004), Ethyl (2007), and a Foundation for Contemporary Arts Grants to Artists (2012) awards. In 2024, Bond was named a MacArthur Fellow.

== Early life ==
Bond grew up in Hagerstown, Maryland.

As "a trans kid in a small town", Bond recalls feeling "I wasn't being accepted for who I was, but at the time I didn't even have the words to express who I was." Meanwhile, they were taking voice lessons and singing in church and in the local community theatre.

Bond studied theater at Adelphi University on Long Island from 1981 to 1985. They saw Simon and Garfunkel in concert in Central Park, but it was visiting Carnegie Hall for the first time to see Judy Collins that invoked the realization that "I had escaped my hometown and was finally beginning to live the life I'd dreamed of."

== Early career ==
After graduation, Bond worked briefly at Details magazine. Returning to Maryland, they found roles in regional dinner theaters, often doubling as a server. Bond moved to San Francisco in 1988.

Bond started out clerking in a gay bookstore, and at some point, adopted the stage name of Justin.

A turning point occurred when Kate Bornstein cast Bond in her play Hidden: A Gender, using the life of the French, intersex person Herculine Barbin as an autobiographical device. Bond "was not sure [they] could really pull off playing a girl", according to Bornstein, and feared the censure of "[their] gay male friends". With the assistance of Kenny Mellman, they created the lounge act Dixie McCall's Patterns for Living around the persona of actress and singer Julie London. The duo played a number of gigs, both in and out of character; three years after attending Pride for the first time, Bond was hosting the show at the end of the parade. In 1993, Bond hosted the first San Francisco Drag King Contest at the DNA Lounge with Elvis Herselvis. In 1994, they appeared on film for the first time, as Amphetamine in John Moritsugu's Mod Fuck Explosion, and again the following year in Fanci's Persuasion.

== Trans-Atlantic cabaret ==
=== Kiki and Herb: 1993–2007 ===
Kiki and Herb met in the Eerie Childrens Institute in Western Pennsylvania in 1934. By the time they were in their late teens they were playing professionally on the Burlesque Circuit where Kiki, who had just given birth to her first child – a bastard named Bradford – was billed as "The Completely Insane Miss Kiki DuRane". In 1957 Kiki and Herb released their first LP "The Hazy Days of Kiki" to universal indifference.

— Part of the fictional biography for Kiki and Herb.

Bond is best known for originating the role of washed-up lounge singer Kiki DuRane, "an alcoholic battle-axe with a throat full of razor-blades". Kiki's equally-damaged accompanist Herb, played by pianist Kenny Mellman, made up the other half of the duo, billed as Kiki and Herb. Critics lauded both the performance and the edgy, eclectic repertoire. Described in one place as "tragically hip", the inspiration arose "out of my own trauma regarding AIDS and so many people dying", according to Bond. "All our friends were dying of AIDS, and it was a way to get out all our rage", said Mellman.

Bond moved to New York City in 1994 in the midst of crackdown on queer clubs by then-mayor Rudy Giuliani. Journalist John Russell saw in Kiki "an icon to rival Hedwig". The New York Times called Kiki "the town's most endearingly unhinged chanteuse", comparing Bond favorably to more conventional performers for whom "the point is never the prettiness of the voice". Bond has said that "I think that the reason people liked Kiki so much is that she had just about everything wrong with her."

Kiki and Herb met with more critical acclaim and developed a cult following. They received their first New York Times review for Have Another, (1999), a show that earned a GLAAD media award the following year. They performed extensively, namely in London's Soho Theatre and Queen Elizabeth Hall and New York's The Knitting Factory and Carnegie Hall, as well as a host of other venues worldwide. Their numerous collaborators included Debbie Harry of Blondie, comedian Sandra Bernhard, and Antony of Antony and the Johnsons. Their recordings included the Christmas album, Do You Hear What We Hear? (2000), and Kiki and Herb Will Die for You: Live at Carnegie Hall (2005). In 2004, Bond and Mellman did a cameo in the Sony Pictures release Imaginary Heroes, with script by Dan Harris. Appearing alongside Sigourney Weaver, Jeff Daniels, and Emile Hirsch, the duo reprised the Melanie Safka composition Tonight's the Kind of Night from Do You Hear What We Hear? Their stage act was captured on video in Kiki and Herb Live at the Knitting Factory (2007). They toured twice in the U.S., including the 2007 'Year of Magical Drinking Tour.'

The duo traveled repeatedly to London, where Bond continued to work on an MA in scenography at Central St. Martin's College of Art and Design when not performing. London shows included Where Are We Now?, Kiki & Herb: There's a Stranger in the Manger, and Kiki & Herb Mount The President, the latter performed aboard HMS President in the River Thames. Bond had a Top 20 Single on the UK alternative chart and was named one of England's fifty funniest people by Time Out London. The mockumentaries titled Kiki and Herb on the Rocks (2005) and Kiki and Herb Reloaded (2005) followed the pair to London and around the UK, respectively.

Their show Kiki & Herb: Alive on Broadway ran for five weeks in 2006, and was nominated for a 2007 Tony for Special Theatrical Event. One critic noted that onstage they are "Alive with a capital A, with all the human vitality and fallibility that that implies". A poster on tribe.net reported hearing them mentioned on an episode of Will and Grace early in 2006, noting that "now they have crossed over".

After closing on Broadway, Bond returned for the final, American tour. This was followed by a return to Carnegie Hall for a one-night show on December 12, 2007, billed as Kiki and Herb: The Second Coming – A Christmas Concert.

=== Solo career: 1993–present ===
Before retiring Kiki in 2008, Bond was touring nationally and abroad, appearing in film, and recording under the name of Justin Bond.

Bond's first album was the result of an improvised concert with experimental, electronic sound artist Bob Ostertag and a Japanese turntablist from the Tokyo noise underground, Otomo Yoshihide, at San Francisco's Great American Music Hall in 1997. They already appeared on two tracks ("Not Your Girl" and "The Man in the Blue Slip") on Ostertag's 1995 album "Fear No Love", sharing co-lead vocals duties with Mike Patton. Other guests on the record were Fred Frith and Lynn Breedlove. At the behest of the record label Asphodel, an album was recorded in this location and in studio at Toast, with additional tracks and musicians added later. Because Otomo spoke little English and could not understand what Bond was saying, he watched the recording engineer through the glass and "when I see he laugh, I play something funny." The album was released under the Seeland label in 1999 as PantyChrist, with a European, promotional tour. Although it failed commercially, Ostertag viewed it from an artistic standpoint as "one of my most successful projects".

Bond released a five-track EP Pink Slip in June 2009 featuring four original songs ("The New Depression", "May Queen", "The Puppet Song", "Michael in Blue") and a cover of Radiohead's "Arpeggi/Weird Fishes". Pink Slip was recorded at Le Poisson Rouge and Bond hoped income from the EP would help fund the recording of an album. Both of the albums were self-financed, and both were the result of a collaboration with pianist/producer Thomas Bartlett of the band Doveman. The first, Dendrophile (2011), contained a mix of original compositions and covers modeled on a type of "early-'70s folk-pop variety album" in the spirit of Judy Collins, featuring a duet with English singer-songwriter Beth Orton. Bond used Kickstarter to finance the release of a second album, Silver Wells, in 2012. The album was conceived as an homage to the 1970 Joan Didion novel Play it as it Lays.

In 2012, Bond toured nationally with lesbian-feminist, spoken-word collective Sister Spit. promoting the new album. Later that year, they opened the holiday show Snow Angel.

In June 2006, Bond appeared with David Hoyle in When David Met Justin at London's Bush Hall. Performing with the House of Whimsy Players at The Kitchen in October, Bond staged Re:Galli Blond (A Sissy Fix), "a self-penned musical spectacle of transgender oppression and uplift". They also appeared in Paul Festa's Apparition of the Eternal Church (2006).

Bond has hosted the Weimer New York variety show since its inception in 2007. Justin Bond Is Close to You reinterpreted Karen Carpenter's album Close to You as part of Joe's Pub in the Park in Central Park in 2007, later moving to Australia's Sydney Opera House.

In 2008, the GLAAD-nominated show Lustre premiered at PS122 in the East Village, then toured the UK with stops in London and Manchester as part of the It's Queer Up North Arts Festival. In December 2008, Bond appeared at London's Southbank Centre in Sinderella, written by Martyn Jacques of the Tiger Lillies.

Justin Bond: Christmas Spells opened in December 2010 at Abrons Arts Center on Grand Street in Manhattan's Lower East Side. The two-part show included a trademark cabaret performance of holiday tunes, showcasing an original composition Could Baby Jesus in His Manger Foresee the Hate Sprung from That Night? This was followed by a theatrical adaptation of a short story by gender-theorist Kate Bornstein. In December 2015, an EP titled Christmas Spells was released, including three songs (Have Yourself a Merry Little Christmas, Remember (Christmas) and Christmas Spells).

As for Vivian, that's my self-given middle name. Justin is a very male-identified name, and I wanted something that would balance it. I had an uncle named Vivian Francis. He was a wonderful person, but he changed his name to Victor. He didn't like being Vivian. But it's fine with me.

— Justin Vivian Bond, 2010.

Bond starred as Warhol superstar Jackie Curtis in Jukebox Jackie as part of the 50th anniversary season of La MaMa Experimental Theatre Club between May and June 2012. "I've always been really interested in Jackie, Holly Woodlawn, and Candy Darling", they recounted in an interview at the time, "because they, along with Renée Richards and Christine Jorgensen, were the first famous trans people. When I was young, they were really the only trans people to which I had been exposed." According to Bond, the project originated as a revival of one of Jackie's "crazy, amphetamine-fueled" plays, but Bond (and director Scott Wittman) "couldn't really make sense of them" and turned to reportage instead. "I always liked Jackie", they said, "because Jackie wasn't willing to say 'I am a woman trapped in a man's body,' she'd say 'I'm trans, I'm not a man. I'm not a woman. I'm Jackie.' Which, by the way, was the last line of the show."

Bond's show Mx America was slated to open in Australia in February 2013.

Beginning in January 2014, Bond appeared alongside Stephen Spinella in the Classic Stage Company production of the Bertolt Brecht play A Man's a Man (Man Equals Man), with new music by Duncan Sheik. The show ran off-Broadway at the company's theater on 13th Street in Manhattan's East Village, with Bond playing the part of Leokadia Begbick, a role originated by Brecht's wife Helene Weigel.

In December 2014, Bond's performed in Star of Light! An Evening of Bi-Polar Witchy Wonder, which opened at Joe's Pub on Lafayette near Manhattan's Astor Place.

In 2006, Bond appeared in the film Shortbus. In the movie, directed by fellow Radical Faerie John Cameron Mitchell, they played the mistress of ceremonies at the eponymous avant-garde salon Shortbus, singing the Scott Matthew number "In the End" to the music of the Hungry March Band.

Jake Shears, lead singer of Scissor Sisters, has cited the Kiki and Herb Christmas Show as inspiration. Bond and Shears became friends, with the Scissor Sisters fronting for Kiki and Herb at The Knitting Factory. Bond appeared in the 2017 Music Box Theatre performance of the Tales of the City musical, with score by Shears.

In 2008, Bond participated in a Christmas show at the Knitting Factory that included Rufus Wainwright, members of Wainwright's family, Emmylou Harris, Lou Reed, Velvet Underground, and performance artist Laurie Anderson. Revelation Films released the concert DVD in November 2009 under the title A Not So Silent Night (Kate & Anna McGarrigle/Rufus & Martha Wainwright). In May 2011, they appeared with various artists in A Celebration of Kate McGarrigle at New York City's Town Hall to commemorate the passing of the Wainwrights' mother, who had succumbed to cancer the previous year. A DVD was released in 2013. In August 2012, Bond officiated at Rufus Wainwright's Long Island wedding.

== Activism ==
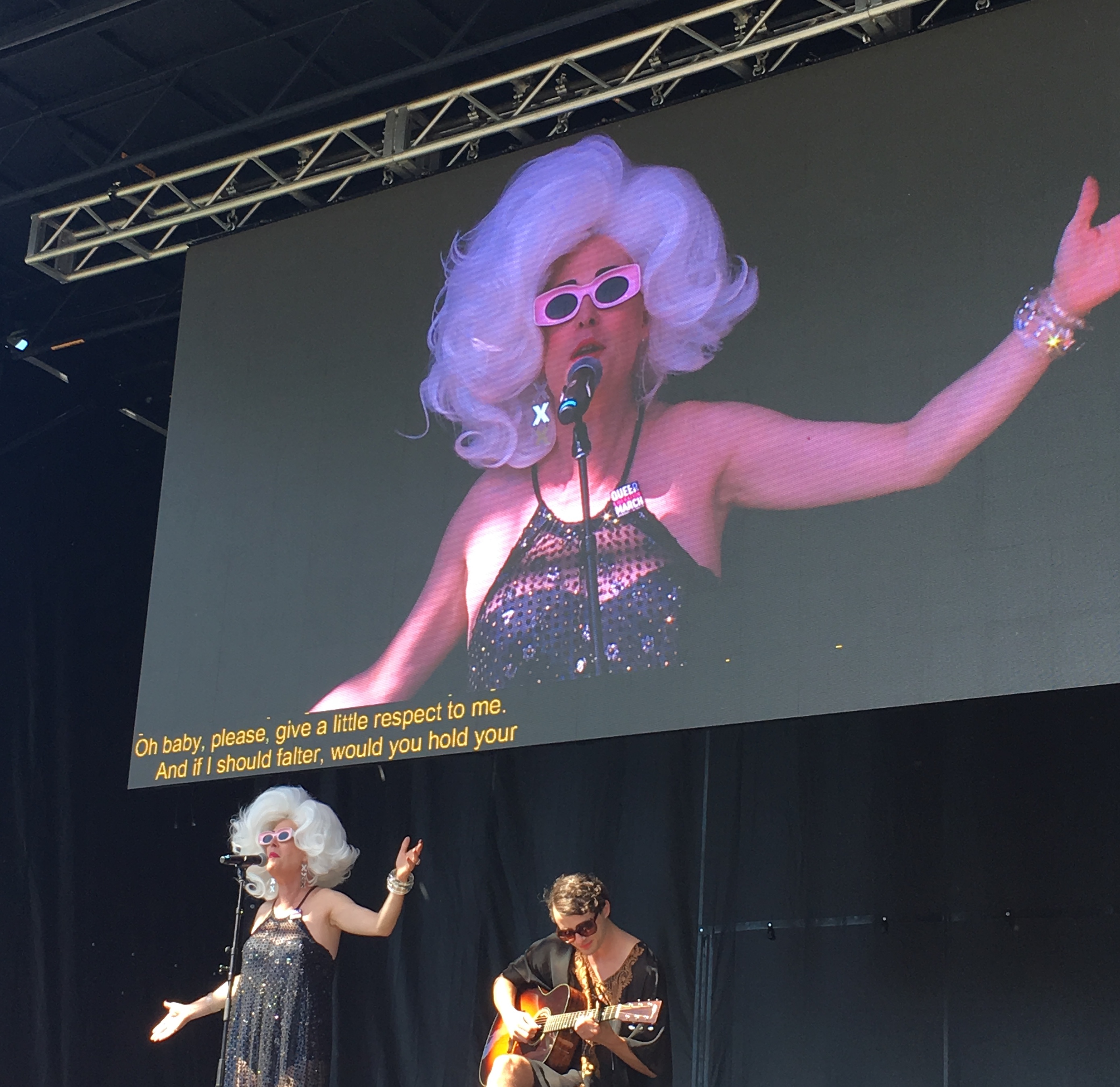
Bond performing with Nath Ann Carrera on Central Park's Great Lawn following the 2019 Queer Liberation March in NYC

Bond participated in the original Gay Shame event in New York in 1998, performing as Kiki and Herb and recorded in the Scott Berry documentary Gay Shame '98. On September 25, 2012, they hosted a special edition of Weimar as a fundraiser for the reelection of U.S. President Barack Obama. In November, Bond announced a performance to benefit the Ali Forney Center for LGBT youth in the wake of Hurricane Sandy. Ahead of the 2014 Olympics in Sochi, they appeared in a video by Brooklyn-based Potpourri of Pearls, protesting Russian mistreatment of LGBT persons.

== Other projects ==
In July 2009 Bond made an appearance on the Logo TV comedy series Jeffery & Cole Casserole, playing a Catholic nun who serves as the principal of the show's all-girl Catholic school.

In 2011, Bond published a memoir about their childhood, Tango: My Childhood Backwards and in High Heels. It described their experiences of growing up feeling different from their peers and standing out, thus facing intense homophobia and transphobia. They shared their internal struggle to figure out who they were and who they wanted to be, along with the gender and sexual explorations that shaped their childhood understanding of themself. Tango won the 2012 Lambda Literary Award for Transgender Nonfiction.

In 2012, Bond announced the creation of a signature fragrance by Ralf Schwieger, a "trans-scent" for all genders named The Afternoon of a Faun after the French poem and modernist ballet of the same name, and issued under the French label État libre d'Orange. It was launched in February 2013, at Manhattan's Museum of Arts and Design on Columbus Circle.

Also in 2012, powerHouse Books released Susie Says, a picture book combining Gina Garan photos of the 1970s fashion doll, Susie Sad Eyes, with bon mots from Bond's Twitter account.

In the summer of 2014, Bond curated and emceed a cabaret season at the Spiegeltent at the Bard SummerScape Festival in the Hudson Valley, New York. They are set to reprise this emcee role in summer 2015, with guests including Alan Cumming, Suzanne Vega, Martha Wainwright, Stephen Merritt, and Lea Delaria.

In July 2020 Bond was announced as part of the cast of Audible's adaptation of Neil Gaiman's The Sandman series, playing the role of Desire of the Endless.

In 2026, Bond appeared in the opera Complications in Sue as the title character.

== Personal life ==
Bond is transgender and has said, "for me to claim to be either a man or a woman, feels like a lie. My identity falls somewhere in the middle and is constantly shifting." They undergo feminizing hormone therapy to appear more feminine, and reported feeling great as a result, noting that "I like the way my body looks. Emotionally, it's evened me out." They do not intend to undergo sex reassignment surgery, explaining that "I like my penis, and I am keeping it, but I am creating a transbody—a physical record on my body and a medical record that I am a transgendered person." In 2011, Bond adopted the middle name of Vivian, identifying as Justin Vivian Bond instead of Justin Bond. They use the gender-inclusive honorific Mx. (in place of Ms./Mr.) and neopronoun v (with vself instead of her/himself), a reference to Bond's middle name.

In concert at the end of 2014, Bond disclosed having received an invitation to return home for Thanksgiving, conditional upon leaving behind "that fake woman". Acknowledging that "a lot of trans-kids get kicked out of their homes", they mused. "I didn't until I was 51. So I think I'm gonna make it." Elsewhere, they have said that "if it wasn't for my family and the rage they engendered in me, I wouldn't be here."

== Recognition and influence ==
Bond was referenced in the 1999 Le Tigre song "Hot Topic".

== Discography ==
Title	Year	Format	Notes
Fear No Love	1995	Album	With Bob Ostertag, Mike Patton, Fred Frith and Lynn Breedlove
PantyChrist	1999	Album	With Bob Ostertag and Otomo Yoshihide
Do You Hear What We Hear?	2000	Album	With Kenny Mellman as Kiki and Herb
Calling All Kings & Queens	2001	Album	Various artists compilation with Kenny Mellman as Kiki and Herb
Kiki and Herb Will Die for You: Live at Carnegie Hall	2005	Album	With Kenny Mellman as Kiki and Herb
Broadway's Greatest Gifts: Carols for a Cure Volume 8	2006	Album	Various artists compilation with Kenny Mellman as Kiki and Herb
Shortbus	2006	Soundtrack	With The Hungry March Band
How Do You Dance to Techno?	2008	Single	Plush label, France.
Pink Slip	2009	EP	
Sinderella	2009	Album	With The Tiger Lillies
Dendrophile	2011	Album	
Silver Wells	2012	Album	
Sing Me the Songs: Celebrating the Works of Kate McGarrigle	2013	Album	Various artists live recordings
Christmas Spells	2015	EP	
Whitey on the Moon	2020	EP	Live performances previously recorded with Kenny Mellman as Kiki and Herb; title track based on the 1970 poem by Gil Scott-Heron
Dido's Lament/ White Flag Medley	2021	Single	With Anthony Roth Costanzo
Only An Octave Apart	2021	Album	With Anthony Roth Costanzo

== Filmography ==
=== Film ===
Year	Title	Role	Director
1994	Mod Fuck Explosion	Amphetamine	Jon Moritsugu
1995	Fanci's Persuasion	Irene Wiesenthal	Charles Herman-Wurmfeld
1998	Gay Shame '98	Kiki	Scott Berry
1998	Downtown Darlings	Justin Bond	Daniel Falcone
2004	Imaginary Heroes	Kiki	Dan Harris
2005	Kiki and Herb on the Rocks	Kiki	Mike Nicholls
2005	Kiki and Herb Reloaded	Kiki	Michaline Babich, Chris Gallagher, Matt Gallagher
2006	The Banana Monologue	Justin Bond	Ian Rodney Wooldridge
2006	Shortbus	Justin Bond	John Cameron Mitchell
2006	Apparition of the Eternal Church	Kiki	Paul Festa
2007	Kiki & Herb Live at the Knitting Factory	Kiki	Gerard Schmidt
2007	Gifted and Challenged: The Making of Shortbus	Justin Bond	M. Sean Kaminsky
2008	SqueezeBox!	Kiki	Steven Saporito and Zach Shaffer
2009	A Not So Silent Night (Kate & Anna McGarrigle/Rufus & Martha Wainwright)	Justin Bond	Gerard Schmidt
2009	The Mystery of Claywoman	Disco Delilah	Rob Roth
2010	Justin Bond Is Everything You Always Wanted to Know About Sex	Justin Bond	Mark Huestis
2011	Walden	Bond	Joel Trudgeon
2012	Sunset Stories	Miss Lana	Ernesto Foronda and Silas Howard
2013	Sing Me the Songs That Say I Love You: A Concert for Kate McGarrigle	Justin V. Bond	Lian Lunson
2014	Kate Bornstein Is a Queer and Pleasant Danger	Justin V. Bond	Sam Feder
2014	Club King	Justin V. Bond	Jon Bush
2014	Golden Age of Hustlers	Justin V. Bond	Silas Howard and Erin Greenwell
2014	The Size Queens: 50 Shades of Pale	The Swan	Chuck Mobley
2016	Danny Says	Justin V. Bond	Brendan Toller
2018	Can You Ever Forgive Me?	Lounge Singer (as Justin Vivian Bond)	Marielle Heller
2026	Neverman	Lucia	Rodrigo Barriuso

=== Television ===
Year	Title	Role	Notes
2009–10	Jeffery & Cole Casserole	Principal Agnes	Season 1, Episode 4: "The Election"; Season 2, Episode 4: "The Becky"
2010	Ugly Betty	Manna Wintour	Episode 13: "Chica and the Man"
2011	Threesome	Justin Bond	Season 1, Episode 7: "Closeted Actors"
2012	She's Living for This	Justin V. Bond	"The Justin Vivian Bond Episode"
2016	High Maintenance	Pam	Season 1, Episode 6: "Ex"
2021	Wolfboy and the Everything Factory	Star Creature (voice)	

=== Audio ===
Year	Title	Role	Production company
2020	The Sandman	Desire	Audible
2021	The Sandman: Act II	Desire	Audible

== Bibliography ==
- Bond, Justin Vivian (2011). Tango: My Childhood Backwards and in High Heels. New York: The Feminist Press. ISBN 978-1-55861-747-6.

=== News and magazine articles ===
- Albo, Mike (April 11, 2011). "The Official Justin Bond". Out.
- Calhoun, Ada (September 18, 2004). "Swan Songs as a Duo Plan Life's Second Act". The New York Times. New York City.
- Gans, Andrew (May 15, 2007). "2006–2007 Tony Nominations Announced; Spring Awakening Garners 11 Noms". Playbill. Archived from the original on October 29, 2013.
- Ordonez, JD (January 3, 2011). "The Singer's Name Is Mx. Justin Vivian Bond, And V Is Trans". Queerty.
- Pitillo, Angelo (April 6, 2011). "Genre Bender". Paper. New York City. Archived from the original on May 14, 2011.
- Walters, Ben (March 24, 2010). "Welcome back David Hoyle: you're a divine director". The Guardian. London.

=== Interviews ===
- Murphy, Tim (December 7, 2010). "Asked and Answered: Justin Bond". T. New York City.
- Russell, John (July 23, 2009). "The name's Bond... Justin Bond". Edge New York. New York City. Archived from the original on July 10, 2011.
- Voss, Brandon (July 2009). "Justin Time". The Advocate. New York City.
