= Lawrence Sher =

American cinematographer

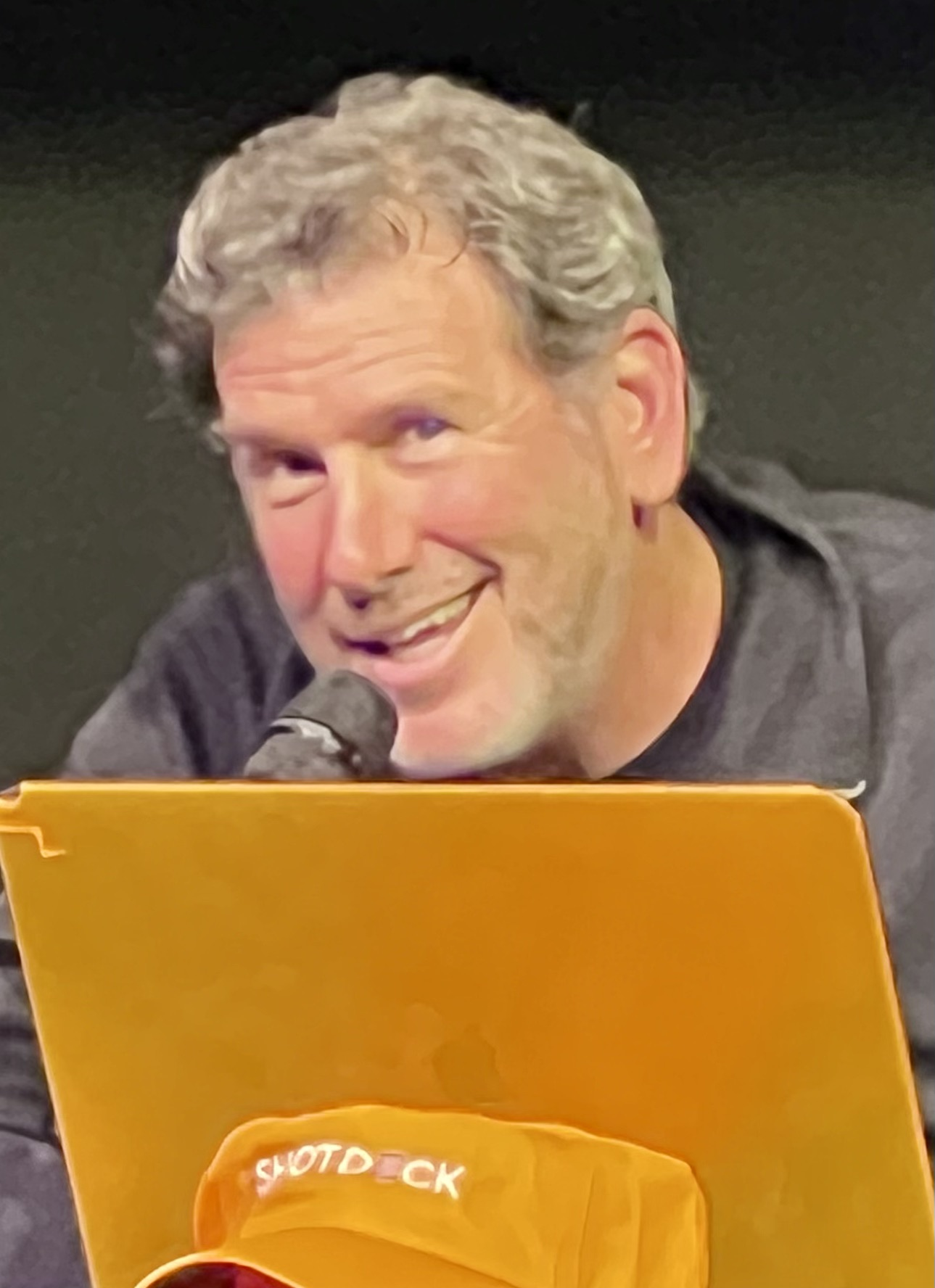
- Sher in 2023
- Born: February 4, 1970 (age 56); Teaneck, New Jersey, U.S.
- Years active: 1992–present
- Spouse: Jessica Aronoff (m. 1998; div. 2017)
- Partner: Hema Patel
- Children: 2

Lawrence Sher, ASC (born February 4, 1970) is an American cinematographer and film director, best known for his works in comedy films and for his collaboration with director Todd Phillips, with his work on Joker (2019) earning him a nomination for the Academy Award for Best Cinematography.

== Early life and education ==
Sher was born to a Jewish family and raised in Teaneck, New Jersey, where he attended and graduated in 1988 from Teaneck High School. His father, Paul, had been a doctor at New York University Medical Center, while his mother, Joan, was a teacher and taught at the Queens-based Lexington School for the Deaf. It was on a high school-sponsored trip to Paris that Sher first developed a love for photography, after his father convinced him to take a 35mm camera along with him on the trip. Sher has maintained his connections to Teaneck, staying in the basement of his aunt's home there during the filming of Garden State, where he was able to use love of his home state to make location shots there make it appear as what The Record described as a "verdant wonderland". He expressed great pride for his hometown of Teaneck and its diversity, recalling how he "spent a lot of time with an eclectic group of people. There's nothing homogenized about Teaneck even though you're in the middle of suburban New Jersey."

He attended Wesleyan University, where he had initially planned to pursue a career in medicine followed by his identical twin brother Andy, who later became a urologist. After taking a course on film history, Sher developed an immediate interest in cinema, recalling that "All I wanted to do was spend every waking moment learning about movies and cinematography." He decided on majoring in economics and graduated from Wesleyan in 1992.

== Career ==
After graduating from college, he moved to Los Angeles and immediately pursued a career in motion pictures. He started as a gaffer on a video shoot and an assistant on commercials before working his way up to cinematography. Sher's first major release was the 2001 film Kissing Jessica Stein. He achieved critical success with the 2004 movie Garden State. Duane Byrge of The Hollywood Reporter, in his review for the 2004 Sundance Film Festival, credited Sher's compositions with "pack[ing] insight into the character's psychological states". Sher also has worked on 2007's Dan in Real Life starring Steve Carell and Juliette Binoche and the 2009 release I Love You, Man with Paul Rudd. While Sher aspires to direct, he is in no rush given that "I don't think I’ve fulfilled all of my goals as a cinematographer yet".

As cinematographer of the 2009 film The Hangover, Sher described how a scene early in the movie shows the main characters on the roof of their hotel overlooking a stereotypical shot of the Las Vegas Strip; Sher indicated that he had tried to evoke the behind-the-scenes Vegas—after the characters wake up the following morning—by shooting a scene behind the hotels where the real action takes place. Actor Bradley Cooper credited Sher's visual style with enhancing the film's comedy, noting how Sher has "a great eye, a lot of energy and he just knows what's funny" and that "Some guys just can’t shoot comedies, but Larry knows exactly what he's doing."

With the success of Zach Braff's Kickstarter, Sher worked on Braff's 2014 feature, Wish I Was Here.

In January 2020, Sher was nominated for the Academy Award for Best Cinematography for his work on the movie Joker, but lost to Roger Deakins for 1917.

== Personal life ==
As of 2019, Sher lives in Los Angeles, California, together with his partner Hema Patel and his 13-year-old son, Max, and daughter Matilda. He was previously married to Jessica Aronoff from 1998 to 2017.

== Filmography ==
=== Director ===
Film

- Father Figures (2017)

Television

- Rutherford Falls (2021) (3 episodes)

=== Cinematographer ===
==== Film ====
Short film

Year	Title	Director
1992	The Return of Wes Lauren	Scott Wiper
1999	12 Stops on the Road to Nowhere	Jay Lowi
2000	Boxing's Been Good to Me	Temple Brown
2020	Nv er	Theodore Melfi
2026	Flesh Impact	Maggie Gyllenhaal

Feature film

Year	Title	Director	Notes
1995	Captain Jack	Scott Wiper	Also producer
1997	Courting Courtney	Paul Tarantino	With William McDonald, Tom Oetzel and Serge Rodnunsky
2000	A Better Way to Die	Scott Wiper	
2001	Kissing Jessica Stein	Charles Herman-Wurmfeld	
2002	Emmett's Mark	Keith Snyder	
2004	Garden State	Zach Braff	
2004	Club Dread	Jay Chandrasekhar	
2005	The Chumscrubber	Arie Posin	
2005	The Dukes of Hazzard	Jay Chandrasekhar	
2005	Life of the Party	Barra Grant	
2006	Grilled	Jason Ensler	
2007	When a Man Falls in the Forest	Ryan Eslinger	
2007	Dan in Real Life	Peter Hedges	
2008	The Promotion	Steven Conrad	
2008	Trucker	James Mottern	
2009	I Love You, Man	John Hamburg	
2009	The Hangover	Todd Phillips	1st collaboration with Phillips
2010	Due Date	Todd Phillips	
2011	The Hangover Part II	Todd Phillips	
2011	The Big Year	David Frankel	
2011	Paul	Greg Mottola	
2012	The Dictator	Larry Charles	
2013	The Hangover Part III	Todd Phillips	
2014	Wish I Was Here	Zach Braff	
2016	War Dogs	Todd Phillips	
2019	Godzilla: King of the Monsters	Michael Dougherty	
2019	Joker	Todd Phillips	
2019	Most Likely to Succeed	Pamela Littky	Documentary film
2021	The Starling	Theodore Melfi	
2022	Black Adam	Jaume Collet-Serra	
2024	Joker: Folie à Deux	Todd Philips	
2026	The Bride!	Maggie Gyllenhaal	
2026	Apex	Baltasar Kormákur	

==== Television ====
TV movies

Year	Title	Director
1998	On the Border	Bob Misiorowski
1999	Shark Attack	Bob Misiorowski
2003	Legally Blonde	Charles Herman-Wurmfeld
2009	The Eastmans	Jason Ensler
2017	Cheeky Plates for Target	Sophia Banks

TV series

Year	Title	Director	Notes
2001	The Wonderful World of Disney	Charles Herman-Wurmfeld	Episode "The Facts of Life Reunion"
2007	Andy Barker, P.I.	Jason Ensler	Episode "Pilot"
2007	Cavemen	Will Speck; Josh Gordon	Episodes "Pilot" and "Nick Jerk, Andy Work"
2011	Enlightened	Mike White	Episode "Pilot"
2021	Kanye with Special Guest Drake; Free Larry Hoover Benefit Concert	Aus Taylor; Michael Gaertner	Concert film

== Awards and nominations ==
Year	Award	Category	Title	Result
2019	Camerimage	Golden Frog	Joker	Won
2019	Camerimage	Audience Award	Joker	Won
2019	Academy Awards	Best Cinematography	Joker	Nominated
2019	BAFTA Awards	Best Cinematography	Joker	Nominated
2019	American Society of Cinematographers	Outstanding Achievement in Cinematography	Joker	Nominated
2019	Critics' Choice Movie Awards	Best Cinematography	Joker	Nominated
2019	Houston Film Critics Society	Best Cinematography	Joker	Nominated
2019	Satellite Awards	Best Cinematography	Joker	Nominated
2019	St. Louis Gateway Film Critics Association	Best Cinematography	Joker	Nominated
