= The Hammer (2007 film) =

- Theatrical release poster
- Directed by: Charles Herman-Wurmfeld
- Written by: Adam Carolla; Kevin Hench
- Produced by: Eric Ganz
- Starring: Adam Carolla; Heather Juergensen
- Cinematography: Marco Fargnoli
- Edited by: Rich Fox
- Music by: Matt Mariano; John Swihart
- Production company: The Weinstein Company
- Distributed by: The Weinstein Company
- Release dates: April 2007 (Tribeca Film Festival); June 24, 2008 (United States)
- Running time: 88 minutes
- Country: United States
- Language: English
- Box office: $443,591

The Hammer is a 2007 American comedy film starring Adam Carolla and Heather Juergensen. It was directed by Charles Herman-Wurmfeld. Carolla plays a once-promising boxer, now a middle-aged construction worker, who attempts to join the U.S. Olympic boxing team.

The film earned positive reviews during its limited theatrical release.

== Plot ==
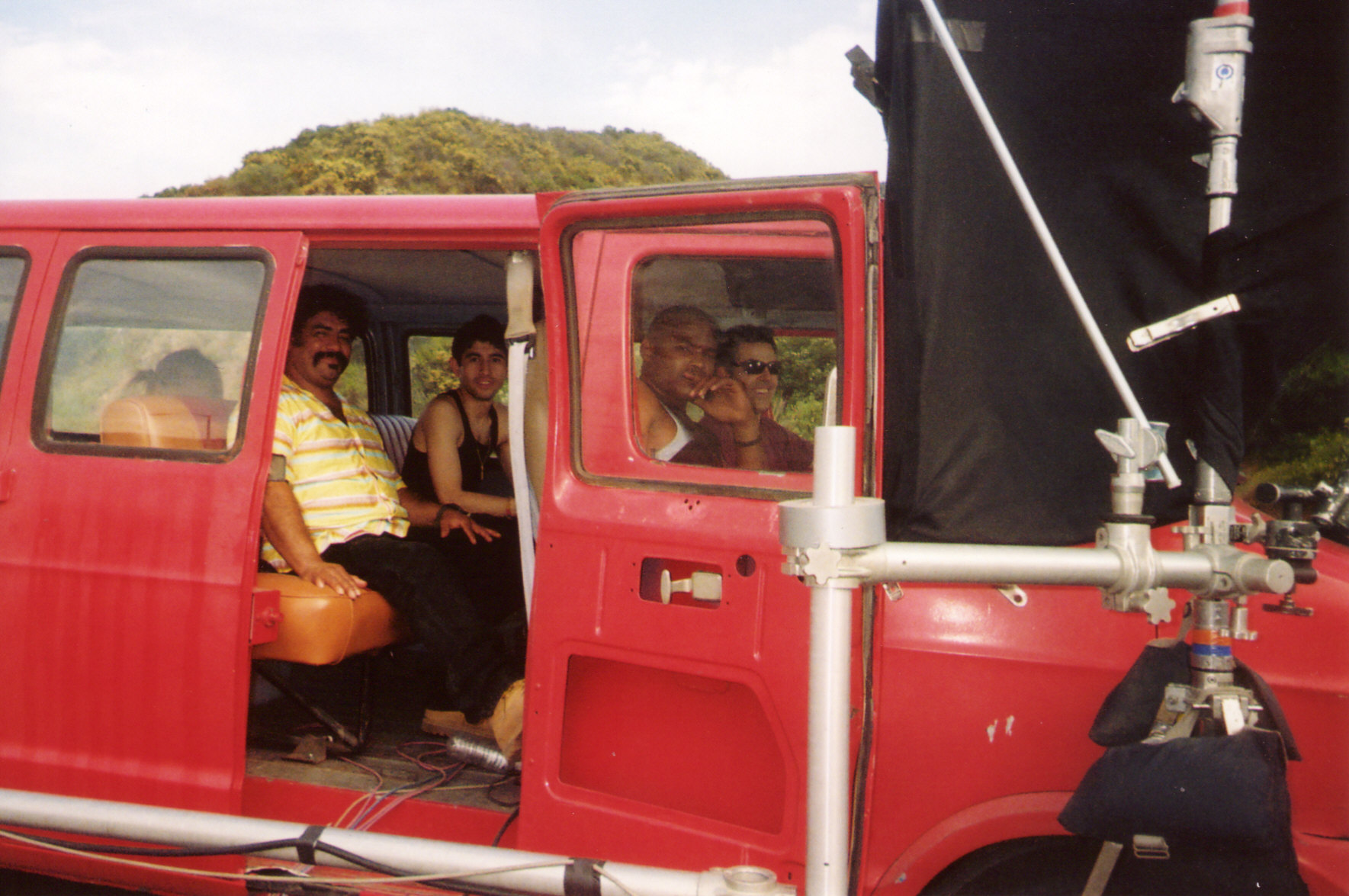
On location in San Fernando Valley

Jerry Ferro is turning 40 years old and leading a mediocre life. He works part-time in construction as a carpenter and part-time as a boxing instructor at a fitness center near Los Angeles. He drives a beat-up pickup truck and loses both the construction job and the woman in his life.

An amateur Golden Gloves boxer long ago, Jerry is asked one day if he would be willing to spar with an up-and-coming fighter named Malice Blake. He takes a beating, but surprisingly lands a one-punch knockout. Due to his strong left hand, Jerry's boxing nickname was "The Hammer," though a running joke depicts people assuming the nickname describes Jerry's work as a carpenter.

He is noticed by Eddie Bell (played by real-life boxing coach Tom Quinn), a coach who will train boxers trying to qualify for the next Olympic Games. Bell invites him to come to the Olympic tryouts. Jerry is clearly too old and out-of-shape, so he is not interested. But his friend and co-worker Oswaldo Sanchez gives him encouragement, as does Lindsay Pratt, an attractive lawyer who works out at the gym and has caught Jerry's eye.

Jerry comes to the tryouts. He is mocked by Bell's top light-heavyweight contender, Robert Brown, which motivates Jerry to get into shape. He goes into serious training, loses weight and needles Brown, telling him there is "a new sheriff" in town in the light-heavyweight division.

What Jerry does not know is that Coach Bell privately sees Jerry as no more than a sparring partner and motivator for Brown, who is a legitimate Olympic candidate but who has a weakness against hard-hitting left-handers like Jerry. By falsely boosting Jerry's hopes, Bell can avoid paying him the usual $100 per day for a hired sparring partner.

Jerry drives team members to the first stage of the Olympic qualifying eliminations in Phoenix, where because of his age and lowly status he is immediately paired against the No. 1 contender. Coach Bell has gotten all he wanted out of Jerry and is so apathetic about the outcome that he deserts Jerry's corner in the middle of the bout. Motivated by the memory that he has never finished anything he ever started, Jerry scores a shocking knockout.

He and Brown both advance to the next round of the competition, to be held in Pasadena. When Brown learns that Coach Bell has lied to Jerry about his prospects, Brown begins to sympathize with Jerry and to bond with him as unlikely friends. Unfortunately, they will need to fight each other soon, with only one able to qualify for the Olympics.

On top of that, Lindsay has a job offer that would require her to move out of state. Jerry knows he has little future in boxing, no matter what happens next, so he needs to get his priorities straight as he and Brown head toward a showdown in the ring.

In the final round of the competition, Jerry and Brown go up against each other. Lindsay decides to stay in California. At the fight, right as Jerry is about to win and KO Brown, Jerry instead hugs him and lets Brown win. The film ends with all three at a party at their house and Jerry becoming Brown's trainer.

== Cast ==
- Adam Carolla as Jerry Ferro
- Heather Juergensen as Lindsay Pratt
- Constance Zimmer as Jerry's girlfriend
- Harold House Moore as Robert Brown
- Oswaldo Castillo as Oswaldo Sanchez
- Tom Quinn as Eddie Bell
- Jane Lynch has an uncredited cameo as a shopper in a home-improvement store who verbally jousts with Carolla about the proper hardware and tools for a home improvement project.

== Production ==
Ferro's life is based on Adam Carolla's real experiences as a construction worker and boxing coach in L.A. The Hammer was conceived by Carolla and writer Kevin Hench. It was directed by Charles Herman-Wurmfeld and independently produced by Eden Wurmfeld, reuniting the team that created the 2001 independent hit, Kissing Jessica Stein. Filming was completed in late July 2006.

On the DVD commentary track, Carolla states that one of his favorite films is Albert Brooks' Defending Your Life (1991), and that with The Hammer he wanted to capture a similar message of not limiting one's life due to fears.

== Release ==
The Hammer opened on 20 screens on March 21, 2008, and grossed $97,137 during its first weekend. The following week, the film expanded to 34 theaters and had box office totals of $104,803. It was presented at the Victoria Film Festival in February 2008 and received the Audience Favourite Award. The film also played at the Tribeca Film Festival in April 2007, and received a positive review in Variety. The film opened nationwide in the United States on March 21, 2008.

The Hammer was released on DVD June 26, 2008.

== Critical reception ==
The Hammer received mostly positive reviews from critics. On the review aggregator website Rotten Tomatoes, 82% of 39 critics' reviews are positive. The website's consensus reads: "The Hammer perseveres as both an above-average sports comedy and a perfect starring vehicle for Carolla." Metacritic, which uses a weighted average, assigned the film a score of 57 out of 100, based on 12 critics, indicating "mixed or average" reviews. Variety gave the film a positive review, praising the screenplay, writing: "Carolla, who wrote pic’s story, was a Golden Glover (and a carpenter), and his solid grounding in the sport works less to lend gritty realism or slapstick plausibility to the many boxing scenes than to create a believable sense of solidarity among the three boxers."

Jesse Thorn of the public radio show The Sound of Young America called The Hammer the best sports comedy of 2008.

== Music ==
- Bad Religion – "Infected"
- Homer Greencastle – "You're the Next Customer"
- Ira Ingber – "Hot Tamales"
- James Kalamasz and Danny Kirsic – "Secrets of Good Loving"
- The Jayhawks – "Blue"
- The Mighty Mighty Bosstones – "The Rascal King"
- The Mooney Suzuki – "Alive & Amplified"
- The Offspring – "Gotta Get Away"
- John Oszajca – "Ring of Fire"
- Social Distortion – "Story of My Life"
- Andy Stochansky and Matthew Gerrard – "Stay"
- Survivor – "Eye of the Tiger"
- Alan Windus – "Napolitana"

== See also ==
- List of boxing films
