= San Francisco Drag King Contest =

The San Francisco Drag King Contest is an annual contest for drag kings held in San Francisco, California and founded by performer and producer, Fudgie Frottage. It is the biggest drag king contest in the world, and the longest running drag king competition in the U.S. The related International Drag King Community Extravaganza (IDKE) is the largest drag king performance event in the world but not a contest.

Contestants are judged on talent, creativity, studliness, sex appeal, originality, humor, make-up/facial hair, and fashion by celebrity judges. The contestants main requirement is that they come from the Bay Area, otherwise the organizer notes "we have gay women who identify as dykes or lesbians, we have transgender men, we have straight or bisexual women." Contestants vie for the title and a large gift packs from sponsors. In addition to various awards (Best lip-synching, Best costuming, etc.) a sole king and a group are named as the night's winners.

The audience tends to be in the gender-bender spirit with many of the mostly lesbian audience also cross-dressed in male attire with fake facial hair.

== Background and history ==
Drag kings are mostly female performance artists who dress in masculine drag and personify male gender stereotypes as part of their routine. A typical show may incorporate dancing and singing, sometimes live or lip-synching to pre-recorded tracks. Drag kings often perform as exaggeratedly macho male characters, portray marginalized masculinities such as construction workers, rappers, or "fag drag," or they will impersonate male celebrities like Elvis Presley, Michael Jackson, and Tim McGraw.

In 1993 The LAB produced a drag king contest at the DNA lounge hosted by Elvis Herselvis and Justin Bond, Stafford was declared the winner. The first annual S.F. Drag King contest was held in May 1994 at the San Francisco Eagle bar, in the SOMA district. It was a pageant and photo shoot that resulted in the city's first drag king calendar.

The following summer in 1995, as a part of a weekly alternative club called Klubstitute in the San Francisco's Mission district, the Mr. Klubstitute pageant took place. It included emcee Elvis Herselvis and the eight contestants were judges on fashion, talent, and question-and-answer. Jane Wiedlin and Gina Schock of The Go-Go's, the late Arturo Galster Justin Vivian Bond John Cameron Mitchell have appeared at S.F Drag King Contest

Over the first twelve years the performances evolved from more spontaneous performances being rehearsed months in advanced and big production numbers.

In 2006 then supervisor Tom Ammiano and the S.F.Board of Supervisors presented a proclamation honoring the event. In 2007 then-Senator Carol Migden and The California Senate presented a proclamation for SFDKC, an event "that celebrates the diversity of genders and in appreciation of the creative performances that contribute and enrich San Francisco’s entertainment community."

In Female Masculinity Judith Halberstam notes that in the 1990s most major U.S. cities have some drag king acts as part of its queer club subculture.

There was no contest in 2020. In 2021 the contest was held virtually and the winner was Meatflap.

== Winners ==
There was no winner in 2020. Winners are announced for individual kings, and starting in 2005 for troupes as well:

- 1994 - BJ
- 1995 and 1996 - no contests held
- 1997 - Cooper Lee Bombardier
- 1998 - Arty Fishal
- 1999 - Barry "Fresh" White
- 2000 - Electro a.k.a. “The Pop n’ Lock King”
- 2001 - Howie Weenis
- 2002 - Rusty Hips
- 2003 - Max Voltage
- 2004 - Transformers
- 2005 - Jay Walker, The Momma's Boys (group)
- 2006 - Buck Naked, Slickk Bois (group)
- 2007 - Pete Sake, The Pacmen (group)
- 2008 - Papa Don Preach, Fella-Fem (group title)
- 2009 - Delicio del Toro,
- 2010 - Hamm Graham & the Wham Bamm Thank You Ma'ams
- 2011 - Gender Queer Society (group) from San Jose.
- 2012 - Cohen Brothers.
- 2013 - Art Kahn.
- 2014 - Madd Dogg 20/20
- 2015 - Mason Dixon Jars
- 2016 - Max Manchester
- 2017 - El SeVan & Jota Mercury (two winners)
- 2018 - Will X. Uly
- 2019 - Holden Wood
- 2021 - Meatflap
- 2022 - Helixir Jynder Byntwell
- 2023 - King Lotus Boy
- 2024 - Papi Churro
- 2025- Misterrr

== See also ==
- Diane Torr
