= Run Fast =

Studio album by the Julie Ruin
- Released: September 3, 2013
- Genres: Indie rock, electroclash
- Length: 44:02
- Label: Dischord

The Julie Ruin chronology
Run Fast (2013)	Hit Reset (2016)

Run Fast is the debut album by the Julie Ruin, released on September 3, 2013.

Track 3, "Just My Kind," was mixed by James Murphy of LCD Soundsystem.

== Critical reception ==
Professional ratings
Aggregate scores
Source	Rating
AnyDecentMusic?	7.3/10
Metacritic	80/100
Review scores
Source	Rating
AllMusic	3.5/5 stars
Alternative Press	4/5 stars
The A.V. Club	B+
Exclaim!	9/10
MSN Music (Expert Witness)	A
NME	9/10
Pitchfork	7.0/10
Rolling Stone	3.5/5 stars
Spin	7/10
Uncut	7/10

Run Fast received generally favorable reviews from music critics.

== Track listing ==
All music composed by Kathleen Hanna, Sara Landeau, Kenny Mellman, Kathi Wilcox and Carmine Covelli. Lyrics by Kathleen Hanna and Kenny Mellman.

No.	Title	Length
1.	"Oh Come On"	2:25
2.	"Ha Ha Ha"	3:18
3.	"Just My Kind"	3:51
4.	"Party City"	3:27
5.	"Cookie Rd"	3:35
6.	"Lookout"	3:07
7.	"Right Home"	3:06
8.	"Kids in NY"	2:27
9.	"Goodnight Goodbye"	4:22
10.	"South Coast Plaza"	3:00
11.	"Girls Like Us"	3:19
12.	"Stop Stop"	2:46
13.	"Run Fast"	5:19
Total length:		44:02

== Personnel ==
- Kathleen Hanna – vocals
- Sara Landeau – guitar
- Kenny Mellman – keyboards, vocals
- Kathi Wilcox – bass guitar
- Carmine Covelli – drums
