= Paul Festa =

American writer

Paul Festa is an American writer, filmmaker, and violinist. Born and raised in San Francisco, he currently resides there with his husband James Harker.

== Writing ==
Festa's essays have appeared in The New York Times Book Review, the Los Angeles Review of Books, The Daily Beast, Nerve, Salon, and anthologies. His poetry has appeared in Fauxmoir and Beyond Words.

In 2024 he was the winner of the J. Michael Samuel Prize for Emerging Writers Over 50 at the 36th Lambda Literary Awards.

== Film ==
His first film Apparition of the Eternal Church (2006, 51 minutes) captures the responses of 31 artists and writers—including literary critic Harold Bloom, filmmaker John Cameron Mitchell, Scissor Sisters singer Ana Matronic, novelist Daniel Handler (a.k.a. Lemony Snicket), and drag performers Justin Bond (of Kiki and Herb) and Jackie Beat—to the music of Olivier Messiaen. It won awards at several film festivals.

Festa stars in his second film, The Glitter Emergency (2010, 20 minutes) with members of the San Francisco Ballet and the Cockettes, opposite the Trannyshack performer Peggy L'Eggs (Matthew Simmons). Recipient of several film festival prizes and critical acclaim, the silent-film comedy is set to the second half of the Tchaikovsky Violin Concerto, which Festa plays in the film.

Festa wrote, produced, and edited, with director Austin Forbord, Stage Left: A Story of Theater in San Francisco (2011), a documentary about the growth of theater in the San Francisco Bay Area from the Actor's Workshop in the 1950s through the present day. The film features director Oskar Eustis and actors Robin Williams, Bill Irwin, and Peter Coyote, and is narrated by comedian Marga Gomez.

Festa's documentary Tie It into My Hand (2013, 80 minutes) screened as a work in progress at ODC Theater in 2012. It captures several dozen artists—including poet Robert Pinsky, pianist Gary Graffman, actors Alan Cumming, Mink Stole, and Peter Coyote—giving Festa a violin lesson as they recount stories from their lives as artists, while also responding to the story of the hand injury that curtailed Festa's musical career.

His video performance Night of a Thousand Agneses was nominated for the 2015 Berlin Arts Prize.

== Music ==
As a violinist, Festa won the San Francisco Symphony Young Musicians Award, toured Scandinavia as soloist with the California Youth Symphony, studied violin at the Juilliard School from 1990 to 1993, and performed in New York with Albert Fuller's Helicon Ensemble. Fourteen years after a repetitive strain injury curtailed his musical career, Festa resumed public performances in 2007 as both violinist and actor with the Stephen Pelton Dance Theater in San Francisco, and the North Bay Shakespeare Company in Novato, California.

At the October 2007 Boston University Messiaen Project conference "Messiaen the Theologian", Festa and pianist Luke Berryman gave the U.S. premiere of Messiaen's recently discovered 1933 Fantaisie for violin and piano. He gave the New York, San Francisco, and Los Angeles premieres before playing the Betts Stradivarius at the October 2008 Washington, D.C., premiere with pianist Jerome Lowenthal at the Library of Congress.

== Other appearances ==
Festa appears briefly in the films Act of Violence (1979), Filthy Gorgeous: The Trannyshack Story (2005) and Shortbus (2006).
