= The Julie Ruin =

American band

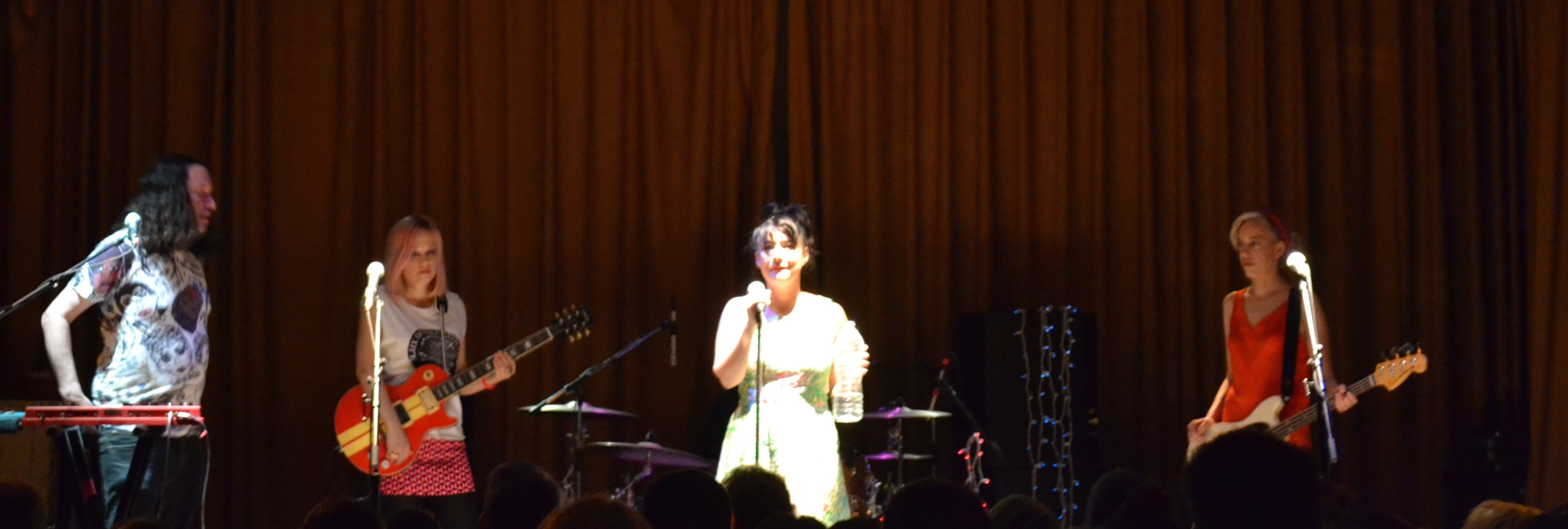
- The Julie Ruin performing at the Beachland Ballroom in 2014

Background information
- Origin: New York City, New York, U.S.
- Genres: Alternative rock; dance-punk; garage rock
- Years active: 2010–present
- Members: Kathleen Hanna; Kathi Wilcox; Kenny Mellman; Carmine Covelli; Sara Landeau
- Website: thejulieruin.com

The Julie Ruin is an American band formed in 2010 in New York City. The band rehearses in Greenpoint, Brooklyn, and records at Oscilloscope and Figure 8 Recording in Brooklyn. Band members include lead vocalist Kathleen Hanna, bassist Kathi Wilcox, keyboardist Kenny Mellman, drummer Carmine Covelli and guitarist Sara Landeau. Hanna and Wilcox also perform together as part of Bikini Kill. The band's name was previously used as the title of Hanna's debut solo album.

In December 2010, the Julie Ruin previewed a performance at the Knitting Factory in Brooklyn, New York.

In 2012, the Julie Ruin released the song "Girls Like Us," featuring queercore artist Vaginal Davis, as a free download as part of a series inspired by the book Real Man Adventures by T. Cooper.

The band's first album, Run Fast, was released on September 3, 2013, by Dischord Records. The first track, "Oh Come On," was released in June of that year.

The band's second album, Hit Reset, was released on July 8, 2016, by Hardly Art Records. The first track "I Decide" was released on April 11, 2016.

== Discography ==
- Run Fast (2013)
- Hit Reset (2016)
