= Stage Left (film) =

- Directed by: Austin Forbord
- Written by: Austin Forbord
- Produced by: Jeremy Briggs; Paul Festa; Kenneth Rainin Foundation
- Starring: Peter Coyote; Robin Williams; Tony Taccone; Herbert Blau; Luis Valdez; Anna Halprin; Oskar Eustis; Jules Irving; Bill Irwin; Geoff Hoyle; Carey Perloff; Morton Subotnick; William Ball; Marga Gomez (narrator)
- Cinematography: Austin Forbord
- Edited by: Austin Forbord; Paul Festa
- Distributed by: Rapt Productions
- Release dates: October 2011 (Mill Valley Film Festival); November 11, 2012 (KQED-TV)
- Running time: 82 minutes (theatrical version); 56 minutes (TV version)
- Country: United States
- Language: English

Stage Left: A Story of Theater in San Francisco (2011) is a documentary film about the history of theater in the San Francisco Bay Area from about 1952 until 2010. The film was directed by Austin Forbord, and features Robin Williams, Peter Coyote, Herbert Blau, Tony Taccone, and Bill Irwin. The film is narrated by Marga Gomez.

The film premiered at the Mill Valley Film Festival in October 2011 and aired on KQED-TV on November 11, 2012.
