= Tom Quinn (actor) =

American actor (1934–2014)

Thomas Michael Quinn (April 28, 1934 – January 5, 2014) was an American actor who appeared in numerous small roles on television and in various films, including a stint as Detective Patrick Mahon on HBO's The Wire.

Born in Queens, New York, Quinn had small roles in the films Major League II and Super 8, as well as an episode of The West Wing. He portrayed Coach Bell in The Hammer.

Quinn died in Teaneck, New Jersey in 2014 at age 79 from complications of diabetes.

== Filmography ==
Year	Title	Role	Notes
1968	Beyond the Law	Detective Finney	
1975	Pick-up	Executive	
1977	Andy Warhol's Bad	Man Buying Newspaper	
1978	Nunzio	Pete	
1978	King of the Gypsies	Jewelry Store Detective	
1979	Voices	Fat Floyd	
1979	...And Justice for All	Desk Clerk Kiley	
1988	Monkey Shines	Charlie Cunningham	
1993	The Pelican Brief	Sara Ann Morgan's Father	
1994	Major League II	Red Sox Manager	
1996	Homicide: Life on the Street	Tom Rath	S05E07
1997	Shadow Conspiracy	Reporter #1	
1998	Enemy of the State	Tunnel Technician	
2001	Shot in the Heart	Uncle Vern	TV movie
2002	The Wire	Det. Patrick Mahon	3 episodes
2005	Take Me Out	William R. Danziger	Video
2007	The Hammer	Coach Bell	
2007	The Day the Sun Never Set	Patrick Meyer	Short
2010	The Next Three Days	Elderly Man	
2011	Super 8	Mr. McCandless	(final film role)
