= Heather Juergensen =

American actress and writer

- Born: Brooklyn, New York City, U.S.
- Education: Stuyvesant High School; McGill University
- Occupations: Actress, screenwriter, producer

Heather Juergensen is an American actress and writer.

== Life and career ==
Juergensen was born and raised in Brooklyn, New York. She graduated from Stuyvesant High School in 1987. Soon after, she began writing and performing for the stage in both New York and Los Angeles. Early on she was cast to co-star opposite Frank Vincent in the independent film The Afterlife of Grandpa, but turned it down to study psychology at McGill University.

While at an acting and writing workshop sponsored by New York's Ensemble Studio Theater, she collaborated with Jennifer Westfeldt in writing a series of scenes produced Off-Broadway under the name "Lipschtick". The response to one of the scenes inspired them to write a film script about a bisexual woman and a straight woman who fall into a romantic relationship. The film was developed by a studio but not produced. They held script readings and sold shares to buy back the script rights and pay for the film's production. The result was the award-winning film Kissing Jessica Stein.

She has written screenplays/teleplays for Miramax, Warner Brothers, ABC, VH-1 and CBS, among others. Her first foray into writing for herself as an actress was her 1996 one-woman show Letters to Ben Stein, an imaginary tale of an epistolary romance with the actor/economist.

She contributed to the Tarcher/Penguin book The May Queen, a collection of essays exploring issues and experiences relevant to women in their thirties. Juergensen's film work has been honored at the Chicago International Film Festival, the Miami International Film Festival, and the Indie Spirit Awards. Her acting credits include roles in Red Roses and Petrol and Haunted Mansion.

She has directed, written, and starred in a short film called The Suzy Prophecy. In addition, she is currently working on the script for a sports comedy set in the world of girls' track and shot. She appeared in The Hammer, a boxing comedy starring Adam Carolla, which Carolla and her husband co-wrote.

=== Filmography ===
- The Suzy Prophecy (Short) - Suzy (2007)
- The Hammer - Lindsay Pratt (2007)
- Dr. Vegas (TV Series) - Heal thyself (2006)
- Cell Call (Short) - Nadine (2005)
- The Haunted Mansion - Mrs. Silverman (2003)
- Red Roses and Petrol - Medbh Doyle (2003)
- Kissing Jessica Stein - Helen Cooper (2001)
- The Afterlife of Grandpa (Short) - Kelly White (1989)
