= Agent of Change (Enlightened) =

- Enlightened episode
- Episode no.: Season 2 Episode 8
- Directed by: Mike White
- Written by: Mike White
- Cinematography by: Xavier Grobet
- Editing by: John M. Valerio; Dody Dorn
- Original release date: March 3, 2013
- Running time: 30 minutes

Guest appearances
- Dermot Mulroney as Jeff Flender; Molly Shannon as Eileen; James Rebhorn as Charles Szidon; Michaela Watkins as Janice; Amy Hill as Judy Harvey; Ben Bodé as Stan Rawlins; Bayne Gibby as Connie; Monica Horan as Sharon; Riki Lindhome as Harper; Bellina Logan as Tanya; Jon Shere as Louis

Episode chronology
← Previous "No Doubt"	Next → —

"Agent of Change" is the eighth episode of the second season and series finale of the American comedy-drama television series Enlightened. It is the 18th overall episode of the series and was written and directed by series creator Mike White. It originally aired on HBO on March 3, 2013. Two weeks after its airing, HBO cancelled the series, making the episode the series finale.

The series follows Amy Jellicoe, a self-destructive executive, who, after the implosion of her professional life and a subsequent philosophical awakening in rehabilitation, tries to get her life back together. Using a possible lawsuit, she forces her way into getting her job back at Abaddonn Industries. She reconnects with many people in her life, including her mother and her ex-husband. In the episode, Amy prepares as Jeff will publish the exposé very soon.

According to Nielsen Media Research, the episode was seen by an estimated 0.220 million household viewers and gained a 0.1 ratings share among adults aged 18–49. The episode received critical acclaim, with critics praising White's directing, writing, performances and closure for the storylines.

== Plot ==
Krista (Sarah Burns) leaves with her family for the hospital, where she gives birth to a girl. Amy (Laura Dern) calls Tyler (Mike White) to tell him that the Abaddonn article will be published shortly. This impacts Tyler's relationship with Eileen (Molly Shannon) and Amy's relationship with Helen (Diane Ladd) when they come clean about the article.

Amy is informed by Jeff (Dermot Mulroney) that someone leaked her role in the exposé. She suspects Krista was involved and angrily confronts her at her hospital room until she is escorted out by her family. She eventually discovers that Eileen informed Abaddonn, which resulted in Tyler getting reported to Human Resources. As she tries to leave the building with the documents, she is blocked by security and taken to the offices of Szidon (James Rebhorn). Szidon scolds her for her actions and threatens her with a lawsuit. Amy is undisturbed by her menaces, affirming that she is satisfied and leaves. She also tells Eileen that the exposé was her idea and to forgive Tyler. She then leaves to visit Levi (Luke Wilson) to talk.

The Los Angeles Times publishes the exposé, with Helen smiling upon reading it. Dougie (Timm Sharp) exits the now empty workplace, while Tyler and Eileen reunite. Amy buys a coffee while staring at a newspaper with the article. Content with her actions, she walks off into the street.

== Production ==
=== Development ===
In February 2013, HBO announced that the eighth and final episode of the season would be titled "Agent of Change", and that it would be written and directed by series creator Mike White. This was White's 18th writing credit, and sixth directing credit.

=== Writing ===
Regarding Amy's actions, White explained, "it was important to me that when she finally has this ultimate confrontation with power, that she manages to be eloquent. Otherwise, the whole thing feels like it's a fool's errand. It's important that in the end, Amy's not a fool. She certainly lets her emotional reaction to things override her intellectual side, or the ability to have a more nuanced reading of situations, but in the end there's something pure and important in her mission."

== Reception ==
=== Viewers ===
The episode was watched by 0.220 million viewers, earning a 0.1 in the 18-49 rating demographics on the Nielson ratings scale. This means that 0.1 percent of all households with televisions watched the episode. This was a 74% increase from the previous episode, which was watched by 0.126 million viewers with a 0.1 in the 18-49 demographics.

=== Critical reviews ===
"Agent of Change" received critical acclaim. Brandon Nowalk of The A.V. Club gave the episode an "A" grade and wrote, "The happily-ever-after parade makes 'Agent of Change' a comfortable series finale, but Enlightened has never been about comfort. It's about a weapons-grade irritant bragging about her self-actualization. Another season isn't just a chance to see what this climax means for everyone. It's a chance to study everyone's varying degrees of enlightenment after the dust settles, apart from the Abaddonn mission, outside of the thriller crucible. Dramatically, thematically, cinematically, Enlightened stands alongside the very best of television drama."

Alan Sepinwall of HitFix wrote, "Fantastic season. Fantastic finale. Bravo, Mike White." Roger Cormier of Vulture wrote, "In a perfect world, Enlightened would continue on and maintain its quality. Or maybe in a perfect world, Sunday was the end, the show leaves a beautiful corpse like it was a Judd Apatow show, and one of the final scenes of the series was Amy's never satisfied mother Helen smiling at seeing her daughter's name in print, a massive payoff that won't be forgotten for a long time." James Poniewozik of Time wrote, "it was deeply satisfying as an ending to a fantastic season's story, and even more so as a restatement of the series' themes of change and openness."

June Thomas of Slate wrote, "Well, if Mike White hadn't been campaigning for the show to be renewed, I would've been convinced that he intended this as a series finale. And I would've applauded his amazing ability to draw so many strands together over the course of two seasons." Aaron Channon of Paste gave the episode a 9.2 out of 10 rating and wrote, "Amy will be sued by the company's lawyers, and it is unclear how many heads will roll at the top of the company. Szidon will go down, but the ideology of corporate greed will remain intact and cagier than ever."
