= Pilot (Enlightened) =

- Enlightened episode
- Episode no.: Season 1 Episode 1
- Directed by: Mike White
- Story by: Mike White; Laura Dern
- Teleplay by: Mike White
- Cinematography by: Lawrence Sher
- Editing by: Rob Frazen
- Original release date: October 10, 2011
- Running time: 30 minutes

Guest appearances
- Charles Esten as Damon Manning; Amy Hill as Judy Harvey

Episode chronology
← Previous —	Next → "Now or Never"

"Pilot" is the series premiere of the American comedy-drama television series Enlightened. The episode was written by Mike White from a story he co-wrote with Laura Dern, and directed by White. It originally aired on HBO on October 10, 2011.

The series follows Amy Jellicoe, a self-destructive executive, who, after the implosion of her professional life and a subsequent philosophical awakening in rehabilitation, tries to get her life back together. Using a possible lawsuit, she forces her way into getting her job back at Abaddonn Industries. She reconnects with many people in her life, including her mother and her ex-husband.

According to Nielsen Media Research, the episode was seen by an estimated 0.210 million household viewers. The episode received mixed reviews from critics; Laura Dern's performance received praise, but the tone and narrative received a mixed response.

== Plot ==
At Abaddonn Industries, Amy Jellicoe (Laura Dern) cries in the bathroom after she is transferred to a lower level department. When her co-workers mock her, she angrily storms out and confronts her boss, Damon Manning (Charles Esten), with whom she had an affair. Damon dismisses her, even as she yells at him in front of everyone.

Months later, Amy leaves a holistic treatment facility in Hawaii, which helped her in overcoming her anger. She returns to Riverside, California, intending to become an "agent of change" and moves in with her mother, Helen (Diane Ladd). She goes back to Abaddonn, hoping to get her old position back, but she is informed that there are no available jobs. Nevertheless, she uses a new strategy, threatening to sue Abaddonn for discrimination on the basis of illness/medical condition as she is diagnosed with bipolar disorder. The head HR representative Judy Harvey (Amy Hill) is forced to allow Amy to come back in a new department.

Amy reconnects with Krista (Sarah Burns), former assistant who now has her old job and is expecting her first baby. Amy also tries to apologize to Damon, who evades her. After Helen dismisses a letter in which Amy opens up about their relationship, Amy visits her ex-husband, Levi (Luke Wilson). Their meeting goes well, but Amy decides to leave when Levi starts snorting cocaine. She decides to visit Damon at his house to apologize, but he scolds her for her harassment, claiming that he regrets their affair. As Amy tries to leave, she accidentally rams Damon's car, causing a dismayed Damon to go back inside. Despite the lack of control, Amy goes to work the next day, confident in her new attitude.

== Production ==
=== Development ===
The episode was written by Mike White from a story he co-wrote with Laura Dern, and directed by White.

== Reception ==
=== Viewers ===
In its original American broadcast, "Pilot" was seen by an estimated 0.210 million household viewers.

=== Critical reviews ===
"Pilot" received mixed reviews from critics. Erik Adams of The A.V. Club gave the episode a "B–" grade and wrote, "I prefer White when he's working a little broader, but Enlightened comes close to hitting the sweet spot between maudlin dramedy and cutting satire. Helping achieve this is the framing device introduced in the pilot, where Amy states and restates the theme of the episode through, say, the teachings of her pricy stay at Open Air or a personal philosophy cobbled together from her library of self-help books. It's one of the more mawkish elements of the series, but the repetition gives these moments of voiceover narration a mantra-like quality which gibes with Enlightened's meditative qualities."

Alan Sepinwall of HitFix wrote, "Though Amy has concerns about large issues, the show overall is mainly concerned about her personal growth and attempt to rebuild her life. And as set up by White, Enlightened feels too lightweight to work as a short drama, and too clumsy in its attempts at humor to work that way." Liz Colville of Vulture wrote, "In the space of a couple of seconds, Dern, one of the more expressive faces in cinema, works through nearly every variety of cry, from full-body sob, to silent hiccuping hyperventilation, to something guttural and exhausted that could be mistaken for laughter if you weren't looking at her face."

James Poniewozik of Time wrote, "Enlightened is not really a comedy, not really a drama, and while it has loads of empathy, it lacks the warmth and sentimentality that we've come to associate with things that TV calls 'dramedies.' Whatever it is, though, I want to see more of it." Robert Lloyd of Los Angeles Times wrote, "Enlightened is to my mind the most interesting and ambitious series of the fall season. (And when I say ambitious, I mean emotionally ambitious, though it is beautiful to look upon as well.) You can't really reckon it by anything else on television."
