= Albert Fuller (musician) =

American musician (1926–2007)

Albert Fuller (July 21, 1926 – September 22, 2007) was an American harpsichordist, conductor, teacher, impresario, and prominent proponent of early music. He was the first artist to record the complete keyboard works of Jean-Philippe Rameau.

Fuller was born in Washington, D.C., and started his music studies at the Washington National Cathedral. He was a boy soprano and studied the organ with Paul Callaway. He later attended the Peabody Conservatory of Music at Johns Hopkins in Baltimore as well as Georgetown. Fuller went on to study harpsichord under Ralph Kirkpatrick at Yale and theory under Paul Hindemith. He graduated in 1954 with an M.Mus.

After graduation, Fuller went to Paris on a Ditson Fellowship. On his return in 1957 he gave his first New York recital. In 1964 Fuller was made a professor at the Juilliard School of Music. In 1972 he co-founded the Aston Magna Foundation for Music and Humanities and became its artistic director. The Foundation's aims are to "enrich the appreciation of music of the past and the understanding of the cultural, political, and social contexts in which it was composed and experienced."

Following a dispute with the Aston Magna board, Fuller left the group in 1983. Two years later, he founded the Helicon Foundation, a New York presenting organization devoted to chamber music performances on original instruments and in period style. Fuller retired as president and artistic director of Helicon at the end of the 2005-2006 season, having led the organization for 21 years. Upon his retirement, James Roe was appointed artistic director and William A. Simon became president.

Fuller wrote the memoir Alice Tully: An Intimate Portrait (University of Illinois Press, 1999), and translated, from the French, Hugues Cuenod With a Nimble Voice: Conversations With Francois Hudry (Pendragon Press, 1999). He is prominently featured in Paul Festa's 2006 Messiaen documentary Apparition of the Eternal Church, and in the book based on it, OH MY GOD: Messiaen in the Ear of the Unbeliever.

Fuller died at his home of congestive heart failure.
