= Hit Reset =

Studio album by the Julie Ruin
- Released: July 8, 2016
- Genre: Garage rock
- Length: 38:55
- Label: Hardly Art

The Julie Ruin chronology
Run Fast (2013)	Hit Reset (2016)

Hit Reset is the second studio album by the Julie Ruin. It was released on July 8, 2016, on the Hardly Art label.

== Critical reception ==
Hit Reset has a score of 78 out of 100 on Metacritic, indicating that it has received "generally favorable reviews" from music critics.

Professional ratings
Aggregate scores
Source	Rating
Metacritic	78/100
Review scores
Source	Rating
AllMusic	4/5 stars
Consequence of Sound	B
The Guardian	3.5/5 stars
Pitchfork	8.2/10
Rolling Stone	3.5/5 stars
Spin	(8/10)
Vice (Expert Witness)	A–

=== Accolades ===
Publication	Accolade	Year	Rank
Rough Trade	Albums of the Year	2016	33

== Track listing ==
No.	Title	Length
1.	"Hit Reset"	2:28
2.	"I Decide"	3:33
3.	"Be Nice"	2:24
4.	"Rather Not"	2:24
5.	"Planet You"	2:34
6.	"Let Me Go"	4:03
7.	"Mr. So and So"	2:59
8.	"Record Breaker"	2:24
9.	"Hello Trust No One"	3:10
10.	"I'm Done"	3:06
11.	"Roses More Than Water"	3:02
12.	"Time Is Up"	3:35
13.	"Calverton"	3:19
Total length:		38:55
