= Kissing Jessica Stein =

2001 film by Charles Herman-Wurmfeld

- Theatrical release poster
- Directed by: Charles Herman-Wurmfeld
- Written by: Heather Juergensen; Jennifer Westfeldt
- Produced by: Eden H. Wurmfeld; Brad Zions
- Starring: Jennifer Westfeldt; Heather Juergensen; Scott Cohen; Jackie Hoffman; Tovah Feldshuh
- Cinematography: Lawrence Sher
- Edited by: Kristy Jacobs Maslin; Greg Tillman
- Music by: Marcelo Zarvos
- Production companies: Brad Zions Films; Eden Wurmfeld Films
- Distributed by: Fox Searchlight Pictures
- Release dates: April 21, 2001 (LA Film Festival); March 13, 2002 (United States)
- Running time: 97 minutes
- Country: United States
- Language: English
- Budget: $1 million
- Box office: $10 million

Kissing Jessica Stein is a 2001 American independent romantic comedy film written and co-produced by the film's stars, Jennifer Westfeldt and Heather Juergensen, and directed by Charles Herman-Wurmfeld. The film also stars Scott Cohen, Jackie Hoffman, and Tovah Feldshuh. It is one of the earlier film appearances of actors Jon Hamm and Michael Showalter. The film is based on a scene from the 1997 off-Broadway play Lipschtick by Westfeldt and Juergensen. It was released in 2001 by Fox Searchlight Pictures.

== Plot ==
Twenty-eight-year-old Jessica Stein is an attractive, neurotic, Jewish copy editor at a New York City newspaper. Her older brother Dan has recently become engaged, while her mother Judy is worried that Jessica will end up alone and often sets her up on blind dates with men, which always end in disaster. One day, Jessica is intrigued by a personal ad that includes her favorite quote about relationships by Rilke. She discovers it is in the "Women Seeking Women" section of the newspaper.

The ad was placed by Helen Cooper, an assistant director at an art gallery. Dissatisfied with sex with men, Helen resolves to try dating women at the encouragement of her gay friends. Jessica replies to the ad, but she becomes apprehensive when she meets Helen, then apologizes and exits. Helen chases after her and persuades her to stay for one drink. The two get along well and find that they have a lot in common; they later have dinner. Helen challenges Jessica's assumptions about what will make her happy and surprises her with a kiss.

Jessica and Helen start dating and awkwardly make out on Helen's sofa afterwards. The usually uptight Jessica gradually becomes more confident and carefree; this is noticed at her workplace, especially by her boss, Josh, whom she previously dated for a year. Jessica evasively tells Josh that she is not seeing anyone at the moment. Helen, meanwhile, is falling in love with Jessica and grows frustrated that their relationship is not moving faster.

Judy invites Jessica and Helen to dinner at their family home in Scarsdale, where she tries to set them each up with a computer executive and Josh, respectively. A thunderstorm forces Helen to sleep over in Jessica's old bed, where she and Jessica have sex for the first time. The two of them are happy together, but Jessica remains closeted about her new relationship, refusing to bring Helen as her date to Dan's wedding for fear of what others will think. Devastated, Helen tells Jessica she refuses to be treated as a shameful secret, and ends their relationship.

As Dan's wedding approaches, Jessica becomes depressed and goes to see Judy, who tells her that she is a perfectionist who always quits things if they are not perfect, even if they make her happy. Judy says that Jessica should not let this ruin her chances at happiness with Helen, who seems like a "very nice girl". Realizing her mother has accepted her sexuality, Jessica breaks down into tears of joy and they share an emotional embrace.

Jessica apologizes to Helen and invites her to be her date for Dan's wedding. Helen is a hit at the event and warmly welcomed into the family. Josh, meanwhile, has realized that he has been in love with Jessica for some time, and confesses his feelings to her after the party. Jessica awkwardly but firmly explains that she is in a relationship with Helen and departs with her, leaving Josh speechless.

A few months later, Jessica and Helen are living together in Helen's apartment, though their sex life has become stagnant. Helen realizes that Jessica views her as a best friend and roommate rather than a lover, and declares that she needs more than Jessica is able to give. A fight ensues; Jessica implores Helen to accept their relationship as is, but Helen insists she needs a partner who satisfies her sexually, and the two split for good.

Several months later, Helen is happily living with a new girlfriend. Jessica is a calmer and more content version of her former self. While putting up fliers in a bookstore seeking a new roommate, Jessica runs into Josh, whom she has not seen since she quit the newspaper to focus on her painting. They have a friendly conversation, and she tells him that Helen dumped her, which was tough, but they remain close friends. She gives Josh a flyer with her email on it. Later, Jessica meets with Helen and joyfully tells her about her encounter with Josh.

== Cast ==
- Jennifer Westfeldt as Jessica Stein
- Heather Juergensen as Helen Cooper
- Scott Cohen as Josh Meyers
- Jackie Hoffman as Joan Levine
- Michael Mastro as Martin
- Carson Elrod as Sebastian
- Jon Hamm as Charles
- David Aaron Baker as Dan Stein
- Tovah Feldshuh as Judy Stein
- Esther Wurmfeld as Grandma Esther
- Robert Ari as Sidney Stein
- Jennifer Carta as Rachel, Dan's fiancée
- Ben Weber as Larry
- Brian Stepanek as Peter
- Nick Corley as Howard
- John Cariani as Chuck
- Alysia Reiner as Schuller Gallery artist
- Tibor Feldman as Roland
- Michael Showalter as Stephen
- Michael Ealy as Greg
- Vinny Vella as cab driver
- Idina Menzel as bridesmaid
- Ilana Levine as Helen's new girlfriend

== Production ==
In 1997 Jennifer Westfeldt with Heather Juergensen, co-wrote and co-starred in a six-night-engagement Off-Broadway play based on a series of sketches called Lipschtick: The Story of Two Women Seeking The Perfect Shade. The play was optioned by Interscope Communications to be made into a film, but after two years, Interscope's option expired in 1999, and Westfeldt and Juergensen made the film independently. The film is based on this off-Broadway play.

== Release ==
Kissing Jessica Stein premiered at the LA Film Festival on April 21, 2001, receiving the Audience Award for Best Feature Film and a Critics' Special Jury Award.

The film was next shown at the 2001 Toronto International Film Festival, with screenings scheduled the day before and the day after the 9/11 attacks. According to the DVD commentary track by Westfeldt and Juergensen, both screenings took place, with the second screening on September 12 producing audible gasps among audience members at the sight of the World Trade Center. The two filmmakers decided to eliminate the nine or ten scenes featuring the Twin Towers because they were not integral to the story and distracted from it.

The film's underlying rights were with 20th Century Fox, parent of the film's arthouse-focused distributor Fox Searchlight Pictures. When Rupert Murdoch sold the 20th Century Fox film and television library to Disney in 2019, it was included as part of the deal.

== Reception ==
=== Critical response ===
The film was hailed by critics upon release. The website AfterEllen.com, which tracks the portrayal of lesbian and bisexual women in the media, reviewed the film positively. On the review aggregator website Rotten Tomatoes, 83% of 121 critics' reviews are positive, with an average rating of 7.1/10. The website's consensus reads: "A trite but refreshing and comical spin on nature of love." Metacritic, which uses a weighted average, assigned the film a score of 72 out of 100, based on 36 critics, indicating "generally favorable" reviews. It withstood some criticism from the LGBT community for not dealing in depth with the difficulties of being openly gay, but even among these criticisms, it was praised for portraying a same-sex relationship in a positive light.

The Advocate magazine listed the film as an essential film for LGBT viewers, stating that "By no means is it a model lesbian movie—in fact, the film is a more honest look at bisexuality and sexual fluidity—but it is certainly a movie that encourages exploration and self-awareness."

In the book Sexual Fluidity: Understanding Women's Love and Desire, Lisa M. Diamond cites the film as a notable example of female sexual fluidity in popular culture, writing that it "depicts a lesbian becoming involved with a man, contrary to the more widespread depictions of heterosexual women becoming involved in same-sex relationships."

=== Accolades ===
At the 7th Golden Satellite Awards, Westfeldt and Feldshuh won Best Actress and Best Supporting Actress in a Motion Picture – Musical or Comedy respectively.
