= Do You Hear What We Hear? =

Studio album by Kiki and Herb
- Released: 2000
- Genre: Cabaret / Drag cabaret
- Length: 63:10
- Label: Mr. Lady Records
- Producer: Julian Fleisher

Kiki and Herb chronology
Do You Hear What We Hear? (2000)	Kiki and Herb Will Die for You: Live at Carnegie Hall (2005)

Do you Hear What We Hear? is an album by American cabaret duo Kiki and Herb featuring several songs with a Christmas theme.

== Track listing ==
1. "Opening Medley: Sleigh Ride / Make Yourself Comfortable / Creep / Dancing Queen / You Have Placed a Chill in My Heart / Oh Happy Day / We Wish You a Merry Christmas" – 10:08
2. "Frosty the Snowman" – 2:03
3. "Exit Music (For a Film)" – 4:08
4. "Whose Child is This? (Medley): What Child is This? / Deep Inside / Crucify" – 6:13
5. "Fox in the Snow / Holiday" – 6:06
6. "People Die (Medley): Rudolph the Red-Nosed Reindeer / Smells Like Teen Spirit / Suicide Is Painless / Miss World" – 4:44
7. "Jazz Improv" – 1:11
8. "Lilybelle / Blasphemous Rumours" – 3:52
9. "The Big Time" – 4:52
10. "Running Up that Hill" – 5:14
11. "Those Were the Days" – 5:11
12. "Tonight's the Kind of Night" – 9:28
