= Kiki and Herb =

American drag cabaret duo

- Origin: New York City, New York, United States
- Years active: 1989–present
- Labels: Mr. Lady, Evolver
- Past members: Justin Vivian Bond; Kenny Mellman

Kiki and Herb (Justin Vivian Bond and Kenny Mellman) are an American drag cabaret duo. Bond portrays Kiki DuRane, an aging, alcoholic, female lounge singer. Mellman portrays her gay, male piano accompanist, known only as Herb.

Despite Bond and Mellman being middle aged, their Kiki and Herb characters are, according to their elaborate fictional biographies, more than 80 years old. Both performers live in New York City, but the pair have performed from San Francisco to Washington, D.C., as well as Europe.

The act alternates between musical numbers and long, seemingly inebriated monologues by Kiki. The musical numbers, often medleys, draw on an enormous range of popular music, from Broadway musicals to Nirvana and from Britney Spears to REO Speedwagon. Kiki and Herb have also covered songs by Suicidal Tendencies, The Mountain Goats, and Butt Trumpet.

== First wave: 1990–2004 ==
Bond and Mellman began performing together in 1989, and created the characters of Kiki and Herb in the early 1990s in San Francisco.

Between 1995 and 1996 Kiki and Herb appeared regularly at "Cowgirl Hall of Fame" in Greenwich Village, where they honed their show and built their fanbase. Among the devotees was John Cameron Mitchell, who later included Bond in his 2006 movie Shortbus.

In 1998, the duo appeared at the first Gay Shame event, held at DUMBA in Brooklyn, and are seen briefly in the documentary short Gay Shame '98 by Scott Berry.

In 1999, they performed weekly in Have Another at the Fez and received their first New York Times review. Their first album, the Christmas record Do You Hear What We Hear?, was released in 2000. In 2001, they received an Obie Award for the show Kiki and Herb: Jesus Wept.

The duo appeared in a cameo role in the 2004 feature film Imaginary Heroes, released that year by Sony Pictures and starring, among others, Emile Hirsch, Jeff Daniels, and Sigourney Weaver. Kiki and Herb appear at a Christmas party attended by the main characters and perform an excerpt from "Tonight's the Kind of Night", the final track from their Christmas album. The same year, Kiki and Herb gave a "farewell" performance at New York City's Carnegie Hall. The one-night-only show Kiki and Herb Will Die for You featured several celebrities, including Sandra Bernhard, Isaac Mizrahi, Jake Shears, Michael Cavadias, and Rufus Wainwright; the recording of the show was released as the two-disc album Kiki and Herb Will Die for You: Live at Carnegie Hall. After the performance the duo worked on other projects; Bond moved to London to study scenography, while Mellman worked in New York.

== Second coming: 2004–2008 ==
Their hiatus was short lived. In 2005, the duo reunited for The Resurrection Tour of select U.S. cities. A European tour followed, which included a sell-out run at the Edinburgh Fringe Festival. Also in 2005, two films about the duo screened at festivals: Kiki and Herb Reloaded and Kiki and Herb on the Rocks.

In the early summer of 2006, Bond and Mellman announced that Kiki and Herb would make their Broadway debut that August. After a handful of preview performances at the Wilma Theatre in Philadelphia, Kiki & Herb: Alive on Broadway debuted for a four-week run at the Helen Hayes Theatre on August 11. Reviews were mostly favorable, including a glowing assessment by Ben Brantley of the New York Times. For Brantley, Kiki "suggests some wondrous hybrid of Marianne Faithfull, Elaine Stritch, Patti Smith and Kitty Carlisle Hart," her vocals "radioactive with an angry sorrow, ecstasy, and cosmic fatigue" in which "the point is never the prettiness of the voice but the history behind it and the passion to endure that vibrates within."

The duo began a run of Sunday-night shows at Joe's Pub in New York City in January 2007, and toured the United States with The Year of Magical Drinking in the Spring and Summer of that year.

On May 15, 2007, Kiki and Herb: Alive on Broadway was nominated for a Tony Award for "Best Special Theatrical Event"; the New York Observer predicted the duo would win, but they did not.

Following a world tour, the duo returned to Carnegie Hall on December 12, 2007 with the holiday show "Kiki and Herb: The Second Coming."

Their concert DVD Kiki and Herb: Live at the Knitting Factory was recorded in 2007 and released January 2008; in addition to the performance, the DVD release included bonus clips from performances by Bond and Mellman in 1993, 1999, and 2005.

Their March 2008 performance at Perez Hilton's 30th birthday party would be their final show for many years.

== Revivification: 2016 ==
In September 2015, Justin Vivian Bond and Kenny Mellman announced the return of Kiki and Herb with a new show, Seeking Asylum! at Joe's Pub from April 21 to May 6, 2016.

== Fictional biography ==
For years, Bond and Mellman maintained a meticulous backstory for their characters, one made official on the Kiki and Herb MySpace page and their official website. This involved the characters meeting as children in a mental institution before becoming a jazz act in the fifties, beginning a long and chequered career mixing periods of success and misfortune. The shows were supposedly part of their comeback trail, and they would perform songs supposedly from throughout their career (which were actually anachronistic covers). Between songs Kiki would tell anecdotes from her life, including her friendships with Billie Holiday and Grace Kelly, and the details of her various relationships, whilst drinking heavily and often having on-stage rages and breakdowns.

However, in "Alive on Broadway," they introduced the notion that the fictional backstory may be meta-fictional—Kiki spoke of the duo actually being thousands of years old, implying that some of her previous stories were, at least in part, lies told by the character. After the Broadway show, Bond and Mellman consistently included this twist in their shows' monologues—Kiki will talk about knowing Jesus "in the Biblical sense," hanging around with Marie Antoinette, and even romancing a young Adolf Hitler.

== Discography ==
- 2000, Do You Hear What We Hear?
- 2001, Sleater-Kinney's "I'm Not Waiting", Calling All Kings & Queens sampler album track on Mr. Lady Records
- 2004, Kiki and Herb Will Die for You: Live at Carnegie Hall
- 2008, Kiki and Herb: Live at the Knitting Factory (DVD)

== See also ==
- List of drag groups
