= Kenny Mellman =

American musician and cabaret artist

- Genres: Cabaret, punk rock
- Occupation: Musician
- Instrument: Piano
- Years active: 1989–present
- Website: kennymellman.com

Kenneth Mellman is an American musician and cabaret artist. He is a member of The Julie Ruin.

Mellman is co-creator of Kiki and Herb with Justin Bond and plays the role of Herb. He created his solo show Kenny Mellman Is Grace Jones and co-wrote the show At Least It's Pink with Bridget Everett and Michael Patrick King.

Mellman performed with The Three Terrors (Stephin Merritt, LD Beghtol and Dudley Klute). He played piano for Bob Mould's vocal on "He Didn't", a track on The 6ths' album Hyacinths and Thistles.
