= Enlightened (TV series) =

American comedy-drama television series

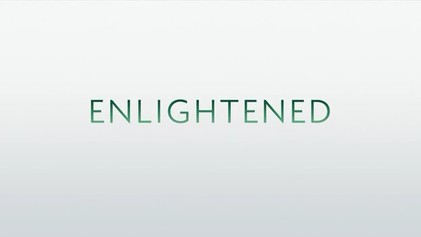
- Genre: Comedy drama
- Created by: Mike White; Laura Dern
- Written by: Mike White
- Starring: Laura Dern; Luke Wilson; Diane Ladd; Sarah Burns; Timm Sharp; Mike White
- Narrated by: Laura Dern
- Composers: Mark Mothersbaugh; Carter Burwell ("Pilot")
- Country of origin: United States
- Original language: English
- No. of seasons: 2
- No. of episodes: 18

Production
- Executive producers: Mike White; Laura Dern; Scott Stephens
- Producers: David Bernad; Jason Weinberg
- Production location: Los Angeles
- Cinematography: Xavier Pérez Grobet
- Running time: 25–30 minutes
- Production company: Rip Cord Productions

Original release
- Network: HBO
- Release: October 10, 2011 – March 3, 2013

Enlightened is an American comedy-drama television series that premiered on HBO on October 10, 2011. The series was created by Mike White, who wrote every episode, and Laura Dern. As signaled by its tagline "About a woman on the verge of a nervous breakthrough", Enlightened follows the story of Amy Jellicoe (Dern), a self-destructive executive, who, after the implosion of her professional life and a subsequent philosophical awakening in rehabilitation, tries to get her life back together.

In 2012, Dern won the Golden Globe Award for Best Actress – Television Series Musical or Comedy for her role in the series. The show was nominated for the Golden Globe Award for Best Television Series – Musical or Comedy.

After the completion of two seasons, HBO canceled the show in March 2013, partly due to low ratings, despite critical acclaim.

== Plot ==
Amy Jellicoe is a 40-year-old woman who returns home to Riverside, California, after a two-month stay at a holistic treatment facility, a result of having a mental breakdown at work after finding herself demoted, which was triggered by her self-destructive ways (including heavy drinking and an affair with her married boss who likely demoted her as a way to keep the affair a secret), which in turn was triggered by a miscarriage and a rather bitter divorce. Amy returns to her old life with a new cultivated approach and perspective, which includes daily meditation and exhorting the power of self-help and inner healing. Though Amy wants to be an "agent of change" in the world, the people who know her best are skeptical of her latest intentions. She moves in temporarily with her somewhat-estranged mother, Helen (Diane Ladd, Dern's real-life mother), and reconnects with her ex-husband Levi (Luke Wilson), who is struggling with his own demons and addictions.

While trying to heal Levi and mend her relationship with Helen, Amy also re-enters work at Abaddonn Industries. This is due in large part to the head HR representative Judy Harvey (Amy Hill) discovering that with her diagnosis with bipolar disorder Amy could possibly sue Abaddonn for discrimination on the basis of illness/medical condition. Once a buyer in the company's Health and Beauty department, Amy is rehired, but assigned to a demeaning position in data processing, a department run by the flaky Dougie (Timm Sharp). Amy views the transfer as an attempt to hasten her departure and keep her away from her former co-workers, including former assistant Krista (Sarah Burns), who now has Amy's old job, and Damon (Charles Esten), her former boss and ex-lover. However, while in this new position, Amy uncovers a range of corporate abuse and corruption occurring at Abaddonn, which ultimately fuels her quest to make a change in the lives of others, as well as validating her own change.

== Cast ==
=== Main cast ===
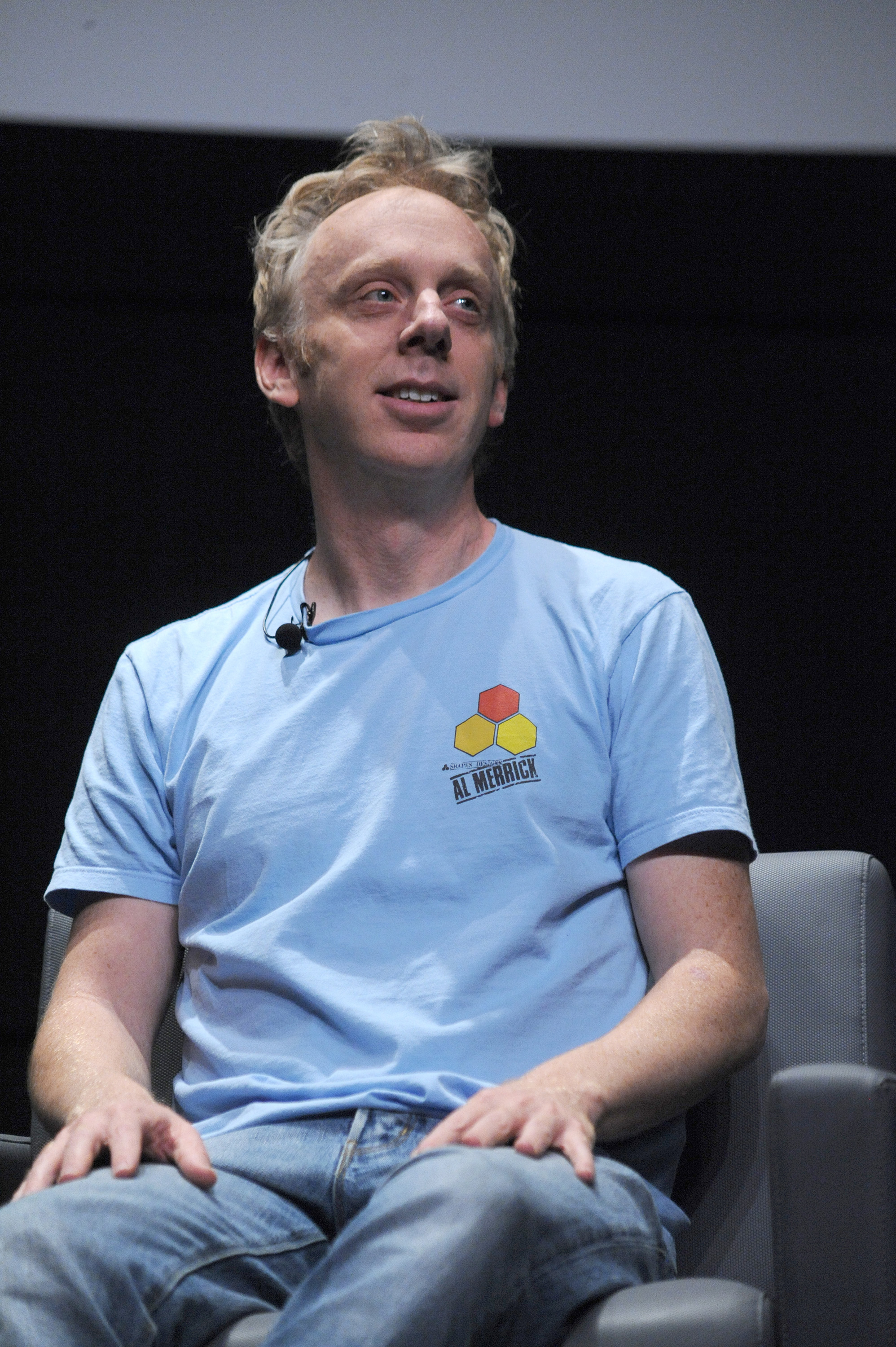
Mike White co-created the series and served as an executive producer. He also wrote each episode solo, frequently directed episodes, and played the role of Tyler.

- Laura Dern as Amy Jellicoe, an ambitious and idealistic yet naïve and socially awkward buyer at Abaddonn Industries. After a humiliating nervous breakdown at her workplace, she goes to rehab and returns to her company with a new mindset but also a much less significant job. She contemplates becoming a whistleblower against Abaddonn.
- Luke Wilson as Levi Callow, Amy's ex-husband. A former MLB player for the Los Angeles Angels who was eventually cut due to his drug problems. Though the two still share feelings for each other, their relationship struggles due to Levi's problems with substance abuse which along with a miscarriage Amy suffered was what led to their subsequent divorce.
- Diane Ladd as Helen Jellicoe, Amy's quiet and rather aloof yet protective mother with her own ghosts from the past. Amy lives at her house after returning from rehab.
- Sarah Burns as Krista Jacobs, Amy's former assistant who now has her old job. Though Amy considers her a friend, Krista tries to keep their relationship at a distance.
- Timm Sharp as Dougie Daniels, the obnoxious, socially oblivious VP of Cogentiva.
- Mike White as Tyler, a shy, lonely coworker and friend of Amy at her new job. He used to be an IT worker for Abaddonn but was demoted after he got in trouble for hacking into a female co-worker's computer.

=== Recurring cast ===
- Amy Hill as Judy Harvey, an HR representative at Abaddonn who encounters Amy when she returns to work from rehab. She is a lesbian in her personal life.
- Charles Esten as Damon Manning, Amy's brash former boss and ex-lover.
- Bayne Gibby as Connie, a deeply religious, conservative coworker at Cogentiva.
- Jason Mantzoukas as Omar, a brusque coworker of Amy and Tyler who is a close associate of Dougie.
- Michaela Watkins as Janice, Krista's best friend. She feels competitive, condescending, and resentful toward Amy.
- Riki Lindhome as Harper, Krista's friend and Amy's former coworker. She has a rather bubbly personality and unlike Janice she is generally friendly around Amy.
- Robin Wright as Sandy (Season 1), Amy's best friend from rehab in Hawaii.
- Molly Shannon as Eileen (Season 2), the shy assistant to the CEO of Abaddonn Industries. She eventually dates Tyler.
- Dermot Mulroney as Jeff Flender (Season 2), a confident reporter from the Los Angeles Times who develops a casual relationship with Amy.
- James Rebhorn as Charles Szidon (Season 2), the mysterious CEO of Abaddonn Industries.

== Production ==
The series appeared on HBO's development slate in August 2009 with Laura Dern set to star as the lead, Amy Jellicoe. On September 9, 2009, HBO placed a pilot order. Mike White wrote and directed the pilot, as well as co-starring in the series as Tyler. The series is executive produced by White and Dern and co-executive produced by Miguel Arteta and Edward Saxon. David Bernad and Jason Weinberg are producers for the series.

Casting announcements began in November 2009, with Sarah Burns cast as Krista Jacobs, Amy's workplace friend. Diane Ladd, Luke Wilson and Amy Hill then joined the series, with Ladd (who is Laura Dern's mother) playing Helen Jellicoe, Amy's mother. Luke Wilson is cast in the role of Levi, Amy's ex-husband, and Amy Hill plays Judy, the head of human resources at Amy's workplace. Mos Def was cast in the role of Dougie, Amy's boss; however, he subsequently withdrew from consideration due to a dispute regarding the deal, and the role was recast with Timm Sharp.

On April 10, 2010, HBO picked the pilot up to series, with a ten episode order. The series premiered on October 10, 2011. On December 20, 2011, HBO announced they renewed the series for a second season.

== Episodes ==
Season	Episodes	Originally released	
Season	Episodes	First released	Last released
1	10	October 10, 2011	December 12, 2011
2	8	January 13, 2013	March 3, 2013

=== Season 1 (2011) ===
No. overall	No. in season	Title	Directed by	Written by	Original release date	U.S. viewers (millions)
1	1	"Pilot"	Mike White	Story by : Mike White & Laura Dern; Teleplay by : Mike White	October 10, 2011	0.210
After a very public breakdown, Amy Jellicoe (Laura Dern) quits her job for Open Air, a rehabilitation program in Hawaii. Upon her return, she finds that her coworkers and family aren't ready to accept the new Amy.
2	2	"Now or Never"	Miguel Arteta	Mike White	October 17, 2011	0.198
Amy's hopes to land a dream job take a hit, as do her attempts to reform her ex-husband Levi (Luke Wilson) and mother Helen (Diane Ladd).
3	3	"Someone Else's Life"	Miguel Arteta	Mike White	October 24, 2011	0.231
Amy considers leaving Abaddonn for a more socially responsible job.
4	4	"The Weekend"	Mike White	Mike White	October 31, 2011	0.134
Amy convinces Levi to go on a kayaking trip, but Levi's drug habit causes the weekend to go awry.
5	5	"Not Good Enough Mothers"	Nicole Holofcener	Mike White	November 7, 2011	0.095
Amy confronts her problems with her mom while dealing with car trouble and an ill-fated attempt to help a mother being deported as an illegal immigrant.
6	6	"Sandy"	Jonathan Demme	Mike White	November 14, 2011	0.155
Amy's excited when a woman she met at Open Air arrives for a visit, but her time with Sandy (Robin Wright) soon leads her to reconsider her past relationships and future progress.
7	7	"Lonely Ghosts"	Jonathan Demme	Mike White	November 21, 2011	0.117
In an attempt to get on her boss Dougie's good side, Amy decides to set him up on a date with a coworker. Tyler makes his feelings for Amy known.
8	8	"Comrades Unite!"	Miguel Arteta	Mike White	November 28, 2011	0.151
Dougie sets the wheels in motion to fire Amy, so she must quickly find a way to convince HR that she's worth saving. Meanwhile, Tyler and Amy's friendship is on the rocks after their awkward encounter.
9	9	"Consider Helen"	Phil Morrison	Mike White	December 5, 2011	0.189
A day in the life of Helen as she deals with her frustrated daughter, her irate ex-son-in-law, and her own haunting memories.
10	10	"Burn It Down"	Miguel Arteta	Mike White	December 12, 2011	0.263
After convincing Levi to make a life change, Amy gives a presentation at Abaddonn that management laughs off, but she then uses a computer password that Tyler discovered to start the process of taking down the company.

=== Season 2 (2013) ===
No. overall	No. in season	Title	Directed by	Written by	Original release date	U.S. viewers (millions)
11	1	"The Key"	Nicole Holofcener	Mike White	January 13, 2013	0.300
Amy, eager to expose Abaddonn's unethical practices, turns to an investigative reporter for help after she hacks into and prints off executives' e-mails.
12	2	"Revenge Play"	Mike White	Mike White	January 20, 2013	0.202
When a team's brought in to find out who hacked into executives' e-mails, Tyler comes to a distracted Amy's rescue.
13	3	"Higher Power"	Mike White	Mike White	January 27, 2013	0.247
In-between letters to Amy, Levi's time at rehab in Hawaii drifts from frustrating to hopeful.
14	4	"Follow Me"	Mike White	Mike White	February 2, 2013	0.204
Amy's inspired by social media; Dougie rethinks his position on the security breach.
15	5	"The Ghost Is Seen"	James Bobin	Mike White	February 10, 2013	0.217
Amy, Tyler, and Dougie, plotting to expose the CEO, try to befriend his assistant Eileen (Molly Shannon).
16	6	"All I Ever Wanted"	Todd Haynes	Mike White	February 17, 2013	0.272
As Amy gets closer to Jeff, the reporter, in their exposé of Abaddonn, Levi returns.
17	7	"No Doubt"	David Michôd	Mike White	February 24, 2013	0.126
Tyler pushes Eileen to get Amy a meeting with Abaddonn's president, Charles Szidon (James Rebhorn).
18	8	"Agent of Change"	Mike White	Mike White	March 3, 2013	0.220
Before Jeff's exposé article appears, a guilt-wracked Tyler confesses to Eileen. Amy's brought before Charles Szidon to explain herself.

== Reception ==
=== Critical response ===
In its first season, the critical reaction to Enlightened was largely positive, scoring 74 out of 100 on Metacritic, indicating "Generally favorable reviews", based on 22 reviews. On Rotten Tomatoes, the first season has an 80% approval rating with an average rating of 7.5/10 based on 30 reviews, with a critics consensus of, "Enlightened is an outstanding and brave show, exemplifying how a television series can successfully present different elements of the human psyche." Time's James Poniewozik wrote a piece titled "Enlightened: The Best New Show No One But You, If You Are Bothering to Read This Post, Is Watching". In it he writes that: "Enlightened, I guess, is the Velvet Underground of this TV season: that handful of people who are into the show are really into it. So here's one more effort to get you to consider watching this weird, perceptive show. And when I say 'you,' I'm talking about that guy over there. If you've read this far, I assume that you already watch it." In Entertainment Weekly's Melissa Maerz piece "Contrarian Corner: Why 'Enlightened' is the best show nobody's watching" she writes about the state of television and where Enlightened fits in: "There's a general feeling among cable TV fans that television needs to be dark in order to be taken seriously. And I get that. Most of my all-time favorite shows are about meth dealers and undertakers and stylishly dressed alcoholics. So there's something pretty brave about a show that's not cynical or sarcastic or defeatist, one that's not set on a street corner in Baltimore or inside Al Qaeda's torture barracks, and still manages to be absolutely heartbreaking. HBO's Enlightened is the most genuinely moving TV show that's debuted this fall. And none of the characters get cancer." The show appeared on several "best of" lists at the end of 2011, with some critics citing its ninth episode, "Consider Helen", as a standout.

The second season received higher acclaim than the first, with the season receiving a Metacritic score of 95 out of 100, based on 7 reviews. On Rotten Tomatoes, the second season has a 96% approval rating with an average rating of 9.3/10 based on 24 reviews, with a critics consensus of, "Enlightened is a must-see, continuing to show Amy Jellicoe as an empathetic, uneasy character who inspires to live positively." Michelle Dean of The Nation demands "everybody should be watching HBO's Enlightened" writing that it "is one of the few strokes of real, original storytelling left in prestige television right now." Hank Stuever of The Washington Post in his review of the second season says "This HBO exercise in exquisite portraiture (I still won't call it a comedy) returns Sunday night, and it is the most hauntingly nuanced and carefully written show currently on TV." Maureen Ryan of The Huffington Post wrote in her review, "The show's must-see second season is one of the best stories I've experienced in a long time (HBO sent all eight Season 2 episodes for review). And -- appropriately for a show about a woman who wants to live a more vivid and connected life -- it is an experience."

With continuing low ratings, creator Mike White in an interview spoke about the show's uncertain fate, in turn sparking a circle of critics to publish pieces on the show, pleading for more awareness and raving about its tremendous quality. In The A.V. Club's review, they called Enlightened "TV's best show right now—and it needs more viewers. Jane Hu of Salon.com writes in her piece titled "HBO, please renew "Enlightened"!": "No matter when the tidal wave hits, we'll have had two perfect seasons. Meanwhile, I'm still holding out hope." Maureen Ryan of The Huffington Post published her own list of reasons for renewal, titled: 'Enlightened' Renewal: 8 Reasons HBO Must Bring Back This Show.

Upon reviewing the season 2 finale, a longtime champion of the show, Time's James Poniewozik touched on the renewal prospects, writing: "And in Enlightened, whether it planned things this way, HBO has the best thing TV is doing right now—a show no other network would probably make, telling a story that the movies couldn't tell, not at such length and depth. Without HBO, this story would not exist, and HBO is a company in the without-us-nothing business. In other words, HBO doesn't owe it to us to keep Enlightened on the air; HBO owes it to itself. That's what you get when you bring something amazing into this beautiful, upsetting world."

=== Awards and nominations ===
For the 69th Golden Globe Awards, Laura Dern won for Best Actress – Television Series Musical or Comedy, while the series received a nomination for Best Television Series – Musical or Comedy. Dern also received a nomination for Best Actress in a Series, Comedy or Musical for the 17th Satellite Awards. For the 65th Primetime Emmy Awards, Dern was nominated for Outstanding Lead Actress in a Comedy Series, and Molly Shannon was nominated for Outstanding Guest Actress in a Comedy Series.

Year	Association	Category	Nominee	Result
2012	Golden Globe Awards	Best Actress – Television Series Musical or Comedy	Laura Dern	Won
2012	Golden Globe Awards	Best Television Series – Musical or Comedy	Enlightened	Nominated
2012	Satellite Awards	Best Actress – Television Series Musical or Comedy	Laura Dern	Nominated
2013	Primetime Emmy Awards	Outstanding Guest Actress in a Comedy Series	Molly Shannon	Nominated
2013	Primetime Emmy Awards	Outstanding Lead Actress in a Comedy Series	Laura Dern	Nominated
2014	Satellite Awards	Best Actress – Television Series Musical or Comedy	Laura Dern	Nominated
2014	Satellite Awards	Best Television Series – Musical or Comedy	Enlightened	Nominated

=== Ratings ===
Enlightened : U.S. viewers per episode (thousands)

Season	Episode number										Average
Season	1	2	3	4	5	6	7	8	9	10	Average
1	210	198	231	134	95	155	117	151	189	236	172
2	300	202	247	204	217	272	126	220	–		224

Audience measurement performed by Nielsen Media Research

== Cancellation ==
Despite the critical acclaim, on March 19, 2013, HBO confirmed that the show would not return for a third season.

=== Plans for season three ===
As envisioned by creators Mike White and Laura Dern, Enlightened was to span as a trilogy, "all having a very different moral compass and theme, it kind of being a trilogy of falling apart and then getting it back together." Mike White detailed plans for the story should Enlightened have continued. These include:

- A focus on Amy's family and plans on bringing in her estranged sister Bethany (mentioned briefly in the Pilot and by Helen in "Consider Helen"), who has a child.
- The fallout from the exposé. "Creatively, there's a lot more story to tell about the idea of Amy being recognized, the wish fulfillment and what comes with it."
- Abaddonn Industries CEO Charles Szidon would make good on his threat to sue her. As Mike White puts it: "The whole thing is going to be the lawsuit. Abaddonn is going to sue Amy, and she's going to sue them. I think it'll be fun to do the send-up of the legal world in the way we did with the corporate stuff", White said. There will be depositions and testimony and character witnesses – and Amy's going to need her flak jacket. "It's going to be all the people we've introduced taking a position, and Amy's going to get a sense of what everyone really thinks of her."

In July 2021, White told The New Yorker that HBO has expressed interest over the last two or three years in "a one-off short season or a movie that wraps everything up." While White said he would not rule it out, he noted that "right now, that doesn't feel like a bold decision" because "it would feel like it was pandering to the zeitgeist."

== International distribution ==
In Canada, the series was simulcast on HBO Canada and debuted on October 10, 2011. In the United Kingdom, the series was broadcast on Sky Atlantic. The first season premiered on December 6, 2011, and the second season on September 26, 2014.

== Home media releases ==
DVD Title	Release date			Features
DVD Title	Region 1	Region 2 (UK)	Region 4	Features
The Complete First Season	January 8, 2013	January 14, 2013	October 31, 2012	Set details: 10 episodes; 300 minutes; 2-disc set; 16:9 (1.78:1); English Dolby Digital 5.1 (all regions); Dubbed French Dolby Digital 5.1 & Spanish Dolby Digital 2.0; English, French & Spanish subtitles; Special features: Audio commentaries; Inside the episodes; Other releases: Available on Region 2 DVD in Hungary (released October 24, 2012); Available on Region 2 DVD in Germany (released March 14, 2014); Additionally available on Blu-ray (Region A only - released January 8, 2013)
The Complete Second Season	August 13, 2013	—N/a	September 18, 2013	Set details: 8 episodes; 217 minutes; 2-disc set; 16:9 (1.78:1); English Dolby Digital 5.1 (all regions); Dubbed French Dolby Digital 5.1 & Spanish Dolby Digital 2.0 (Region 1 only); English, French & Spanish subtitles (Region 1 only); English SDH, Danish, Finnish, Norwegian, Polish & Swedish subtitles (Region 4 only); Special features: Audio commentaries; Inside the episodes; Season 2 not available on Blu-ray
