= Kiki and Herb Will Die for You: Live at Carnegie Hall =

Live album by Kiki and Herb
- Released: February 1, 2005
- Recorded: September 19, 2004
- Venues: Carnegie Hall, New York City
- Genre: Cabaret / Drag cabaret
- Length: 2:36:41:00
- Label: Evolver
- Producer: Julian Fleisher

Kiki and Herb chronology
| Do You Hear What We Hear? (2000) | Kiki and Herb Will Die for You: Live at Carnegie Hall (2005) |

Kiki and Herb Will Die for You: Live at Carnegie Hall is a live album by drag cabaret duo Kiki and Herb. The album was recorded on September 19, 2004 at Carnegie Hall in New York City, and released on February 1, 2005.

== Track listing ==
Act One / Disc One

1. "Close to it All" – 2:01
2. Medley: "Note to Self: Don't Die / Flamingo / When Doves Cry" – 5:23
3. "Opening Remarks" (Monologue) – 2:32
4. "Why" – 4:05 (also quotes "I Do Not Want This")
5. "Hoochie Coochie" (Monologue) – 4:35
6. "Sex Bomb" – 3:11
7. "Yasaweh" (Monologue) – 9:48
8. "Has Anyone Ever Written Anything for You?" – 4:28
9. "The Saddest Day of My Life" (Monologue) – 11:00
10. "A Lover Spurned" – 5:39
11. "Bored, Bored, Bored" (Monologue) – 6:54
12. "The Windmills of My Mind" – 5:45
13. "I Was Meant for the Stage" – 3:45
14. "No Children" - 3:07
15. "Rainbow Connection" – 3:36

Act Two / Disc Two

1. "Piña Colada Song" – 1:13
2. "Institutionalized" – 5:59
3. "Jazz" (Monologue) – 0:39
4. "The Paris Match" – 5:16
5. "I've Got to Go to Vietnam" (Monologue) – 6:46
6. "The Revolution Medley: The Revolution Will Not Be Televised / Release Yo' Self / Lose Yourself / Once in a Lifetime" – 5:05
7. "Dominique" – 3:13
8. "Show Business Martyrs" (Monologue) – 9:20
9. "The Thin Ice" – 1:40
10. "Love Will Tear Us Apart" – 3:17
11. "Temptation" – 4:36
12. Medley: "Love Is a Battlefield / Total Eclipse of the Heart / Turn, Turn, Turn / You Turn Me On (I'm a Radio) / The Second Coming" – 7:31
13. "Those Were the Days" – 7:16
14. "Tonight's the Kind of Night" – 7:01
15. "Ladies and Gentlemen We Are Floating in Space" – 1:36
16. "Running Up that Hill" – 5:28
