= Fanci's Persuasion =

- Directed by: Charles Herman-Wurmfeld
- Written by: Caroline Libresco
- Produced by: Caroline Libresco; Eden Wurmfeld
- Starring: Boa
- Cinematography: David Rush Morrison
- Edited by: Michael A. Worrall
- Release date: 1995
- Running time: 80 minutes
- Country: United States
- Language: English

Fanci's Persuasion is a 1995 American film directed by Charles Herman-Wurmfeld.
