= Charles Herman-Wurmfeld =

American film and television director (born 1966)

- Born: July 5, 1966 (age 59); United States
- Occupation: Film director

Charles Herman-Wurmfeld (born July 5, 1966) is an American film and television director. He directed the movies Kissing Jessica Stein and Legally Blonde 2: Red, White & Blonde. His sister is producer Eden H. Wurmfeld.

== Filmography ==
Film

- Fanci's Persuasion (1995)
- Kissing Jessica Stein (2001)
- Legally Blonde 2: Red, White & Blonde (2003)
- The Hammer (2007)

Television

Year	Title	Notes
2001	The Facts of Life Reunion	TV movie
2005	Stella	3 episodes
2006	So Notorious	1 episode
