= Elvis Herselvis =

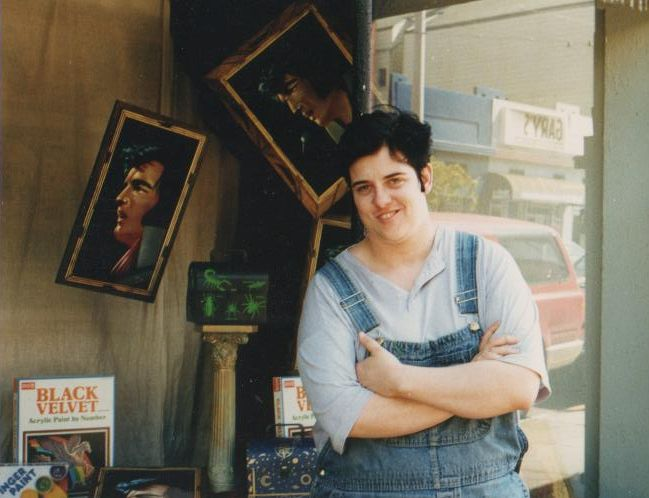
- Elvis Herselvis, San Francisco, 1994

Background information
- Born: Leigh Crow
- Genre: Elvis impersonator

Elvis Herselvis is the stage name of the American actor and singer Leigh Crow, whose rise to international exposure was performing as a female Elvis Presley impersonator. Crow still performs as Elvis Herselvis on occasion as well as sings, acts and performs regularly; including performing with the all female rockabilly band called The Mighty Slim Pickins.

San Francisco-based Elvis Herselvis identifies as a "Female Elvis Impersonator" and "Drag King" and has been evoking the King of Rock and Roll for several years. "Elvis Herselvis & the Straight White Males" were one of the most original and innovative Elvis impersonation acts, recalling Elvis Presley with her sensuous vibrato, while wiping the sweat from her brow with the panties of devoted fans. The performer even "satirizes Elvis impersonators and includes in her act a discussion of Elvis's drug problem and sexual proclivities." Crow's uncanny portrayal has made her a popular entertainer in queer clubs and the alternative cabaret circuit in America. In 1993, she also toured Australia.

According to Crow, Elvis Presley occupies an important place among lesbian icons. She says,

Straight men are very intimidated by a woman impersonating Elvis. It is one of the last bastions of masculinity – the right to "do" Elvis. ... I personally think he was very queeny, in the 1950s he wore make-up and pink on stage, when that was unheard-of behavior for a straight man.

Men had a little more glamour then. Elvis was very primped and had a definite feminine side. The fifties and sixties teen idol works for dykes because they were the sensitive rebels, the little boy lost. It works into a not really butch image but a very dreamy one. Elvis is going to become the dyke icon like Marilyn is for the boys. Like k.d. lang, the whole image that she's got, I think that's where it came from.

When the organizers of the Second International Elvis Presley Conference, held at the University of Mississippi, Oxford, Mississippi, in August 1996, invited Elvis Herselvis to perform at the conference, the conference organizer, Professor Vernon Chadwick, "sought 'to test the limits of race, class, sexuality and property ...'" He was of the opinion that "the conference must comply 'with all applicable laws regarding affirmative action and equal opportunity in all its activities and programs and does not discriminate against anyone protected by law because of age, creed, color, national origin, race, religion, sex, handicap, veteran, or other status'. Whilst these intentions were widely known, a number of local Baptist Ministers complained to the Mayor of Tupelo about the inclusion of Elvis Herselvis on the conference program and sought to block funding for the conference. The church's concerns were supported by the organiser of the Elvis birthplace and Museum, then Elvis Presley Enterprises (EPE) followed suit. Conference organizer Chadwick argued that these actions 'really get interesting when you throw in all the indigenous racism, homophobia, and class distinction that Elvis suffered in the South and throughout his career'. Chadwick received a formal, but diplomatic, letter from EPE's licensing officer which formally withdrew support for the conference."

In a paper entitled "Women Who 'Do Elvis': Authenticity, Masculinity and Masquerade" and presented on February 19, 2006, at the Study of Popular Music conference in Nashville, Tennessee, Cornell University researcher Francesca Brittan dealt with female Elvis Presley impersonators such as Elvis Herselvis and found them to be "campy, cheeky, and often disturbingly convincing."

== See also ==
- List of drag kings
