= Le Tigre discography =

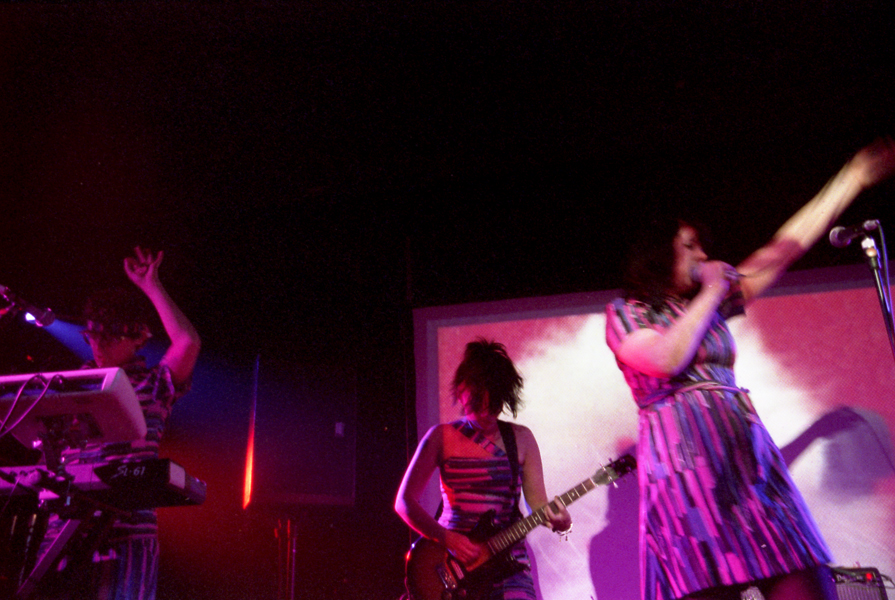
- Le Tigre performing live in 2004
- Studio albums: 3
- Extended plays: 7
- Singles: 4
- Video albums: 1
- Music videos: 7
- Other appearances: 9

The discography of Le Tigre, an American electro–punk band, consists of three studio albums, seven extended plays, four singles, one video album and seven music videos. Le Tigre was formed in 1998 by Kathleen Hanna, Johanna Fateman and Sadie Benning. The band is known for its left-wing sociopolitical lyrics, dealing with issues of feminism and the LGBT community.

The band's self-titled debut album was released in October 1999. In 2000, Benning left the group to pursue a career as a film director. They were replaced by JD Samson on Le Tigre's second studio album Feminist Sweepstakes. Released in October 2001, it is a hybrid of genres, combining hip hop, dance and punk music. In the United States, the album reached number 43 on the Billboard Independent Albums chart.

After signing a recording contract with Universal Records, Le Tigre released their major label debut, This Island, in October 2004. The album reached number 130 on the US Billboard 200 and number five on the Billboard Top Heatseekers chart. It produced three singles, two of which reached the top 75 of the United Kingdom singles chart. In 2007, the band announced that it was taking "an extended break from all things Le Tigre".

== Albums ==
=== Studio albums ===
List of studio albums, with selected chart positions
Title	Album details	Peak chart positions		
Title	Album details	US	US Heat.	US Indie
Le Tigre^{[a]}	Released: October 26, 1999 (US); Label: Mr. Lady (MRLR07); Formats: CD, DD, LP	—	—	—
Feminist Sweepstakes^{[b]}	Released: October 16, 2001 (US); Label: Mr. Lady (MRLR19); Formats: CD, DD, LP	—	—	43
This Island	Released: October 19, 2004 (US); Label: Universal (B0003385-02); Formats: CD, DD, LP	130	5	—
"—" denotes releases that did not chart.

=== Extended plays ===
List of extended plays
Title	Album details
From the Desk of Mr. Lady^{[c]}	Released: January 23, 2001 (US); Label: Mr. Lady (MRLR14); Formats: CD, DD LP
Remix^{[d]}	Released: February 19, 2002 (US); Label: Mr. Lady (MRLR24); Formats: CD, DD, LP
Morning Becomes Eclectic (KCRW Live)	Released: February 22, 2005 (US); Label: Universal; Format: DD
This Island Remixes Volume 1	Released: July 4, 2005 (US); Label: Chicks on Speed (COSR23); Format: LP
This Island Remixes Volume 2	Released: July 4, 2005 (US); Label: Chicks on Speed (COSR24); Format: LP
This Island Remixes	Released: September 12, 2005 (US); Label: Chicks on Speed (COSR25); Format: CD
Le Tigre Live!	Released: March 13, 2012 (US); Label: Le Tigre; Format: DD

== Singles ==
List of singles, with selected chart positions, showing year released and album name
Title	Year	Peak chart positions	Album
Title	Year	UK	Album
"Hot Topic"	1999	—	Le Tigre
"New Kicks"	2004	—	This Island
"TKO" / "Nanny Nanny Boo Boo"	2004	50	This Island
"After Dark"	2005	63	This Island
"I'm with Her"	2016	—	Non-album single
"—" denotes songs which failed to chart.

== Other appearances ==
List of other appearances, showing year released, other performing artists and album name
Title	Year	Other artist(s)	Album
"Sweetie"	2001	—N/a	Calling All Kings & Queens
"The Mayor is a Robot"	2001	Men's Recovery Project	False Object Sensor
"Wordy Rappinghood"	2003	Chicks on Speed	99 Cents
"We R the Handclaps"	2004	Junior Senior	Hey Hey My My Yo Yo
"Sisters, O Sisters"	2007	Yoko Ono	Yes, I'm a Witch

=== Remixes ===
List of remixes, showing year released, artist and album name
Title	Year	Artist	Album
"Girl Serial Killer" (The Dear Hanin remix)	2000	Hanin Elias	In Flames: Remix EP
"Revolt" (Le Tigre remix)	2005	Lesbians on Ecstasy	Giggles in the Dark
"Standing in the Way of Control" (Le Tigre remix)	2006	Gossip	Standing in the Way of Control
"Fleur De Saison" (Le Tigre remix)	2006	Émilie Simon	Végétal

== Videography ==
=== Video albums ===
List of video albums
Title	Album details
Who Took the Bomp: Le Tigre on Tour	Released: June 7, 2011 (US); Label: Oscilloscope (OSC–033); Formats: DVD, DD

=== Music videos ===
List of music videos, showing year released and director
Title	Year	Director(s)
"Deceptacon"	1999	Miguel Gutierrez
“Hot Topic”	–	Wynne Greenwood
"Well, Well, Well"	2001	Elisabeth Subrin
"Keep on Livin'"	2001	Paper Tiger Television
"Well, Well, Well" (Alternate version)	2004	Elisabeth Subrin
"New Kicks"	2004	Samuael Topiary
"TKO"	2004	Rainbows & Vampires
"After Dark"	2005	Wynne Greenwood
"I'm with Her"	2016	Laura Parnes

== Notes ==
- A Le Tigre was reissued on August 24, 2004 in the United States with four songs recorded live at the BBC.
- B Feminist Sweepstakes was reissued on August 24, 2004 in the US with additional video content.
- C From the Desk of Mr. Lady was reissued on August 24, 2004 in the US with an enhanced content.
- D Remix was reissued on August 24, 2004 in the US with an additional remix.
