= Toby Room =

Quarterly arts publication

Toby Room is a quarterly arts publication founded in 2001 and a project of ArtRod.

Organized as a gallery in print, Toby Room featured writings, projects, and interviews amongst artists, filmmakers, and musicians, alongside contributions by established and emerging writers. A focus of Toby Room was to offer a platform for artists and writers to examine their practice, "talking about the things they know" or were interested in, while working across fields of expertise and documenting the work happening around them. Interdisciplinary by design, Toby Room featured writers such as novelist Robin Hobb and NPR commentator and author Andrei Codrescu, alongside examinations of experimental audio works (such as that of Al Larsen of Some Velvet Sidewalk, John Cage, Reuben Wu, Tracy + the Plastics, or Arrington De Dionyso of Olympia Experimental Music Festival), together with that of visual artists and filmmakers such as Mark Tobey, Cathy de la Cruz, Morris Graves, Bill Daniel, and Scott Fife.

Each issue of Toby Room featured an artist-in-residence who developed a theme and project in print. Early artists in residence projects included work by Thin Ice (a collaboration between Lisa Darms, Joe DeNardo, Joanne Kim, and Mark Geil), Chauney Peck, and Themba Lewis. Toby Room also included a reoccurring feature examining experimental film and video art called Don't Bite the Pavement, which shared its name with the video and film series also presented by ArtRod.

For Toby Room 10, the journal was printed as a catalogue of the first year of programming at the Tollbooth Gallery. It featured design work by Rachel Carns and interviews with: Denise Baggett (Smith), Michael Lent, Josh MacPhee, Delta Camshaft Collective, Bill Daniel, Wynne Greenwood, Bridget Irish, Fionn Meade and Rob Millis of Climax Golden Twins, Jared Pappas-Kelley, Rankin Renwick (formerly known as Vanessa Renwick), and Tim Sullivan.

Toby Room was one of four major projects by the organization ArtRod that included the screening series Don't Bite the Pavement and the exhibition spaces Tollbooth Gallery and Critical Line.
