= The Need =

American queercore band

- Origin: Olympia, Washington, U.S.
- Genres: Queercore, post-punk, art rock, garage rock, experimental rock
- Years active: 1996–2001 (Reunions: 2010, 2013)
- Labels: Kill Rock Stars, Outpunk, Chainsaw, Up, Yoyo
- Members: Rachel Carns; Radio Sloan

The Need is an American queercore band formed by the singer and drummer Rachel Carns and the guitarist Radio Sloan in Portland, Oregon, in the mid-1990s.

After issuing a series of seven-inches on labels including Kill Rock Stars and Outpunk, the Need relocated to Olympia, Washington and released two albums for Chainsaw Records. The duo's unsettling brand of post-punk art rock (combined with Carns' distinctive artwork) would set them apart and ensure their versatility. During the band's initial run, they played shows with such diverse acts as Tribe 8, Fugazi, The Ex and Bright Eyes, and toured with Le Tigre, BS 2000 and Blonde Redhead. Their third album, The Transfused, acted as a soundtrack to the rock opera of the same name.

The Need dissolved in 2001, with Carns and Sloan shifting their focus to other projects. After briefly reuniting for benefit shows in 2010, the Need reformed for a second time in 2013 and released the album Resurrection.

== Background ==
Rachel Carns formed Kicking Giant with fellow Cooper Union student Tae Won Yu in 1990. Based in New York, the pair recorded songs on Yu's 4-track and released a number of homemade cassettes. Through the network of underground fanzines and tape trading circles, Kicking Giant were introduced to the riot grrrl movement, which merged DIY culture and feminism. After performing at the International Pop Underground Convention in Olympia, Washington, the energy of the burgeoning Pacific Northwest punk scene proved infectious and both members were ready to leave New York. The duo parted ways temporarily in 1992 when Yu moved to Olympia and Carns to Washington, D.C. (where she briefly joined Slant 6 as drummer) before moving to Olympia to rejoin Yu and Kicking Giant. During the next three years Carns also performed and recorded with The Fakes, Sue P. Fox, The Pet Stains and Witchypoo. Kicking Giant issued their final album on K Records in 1994 before breaking up the following year.

== History ==
=== Formation and early years (1995–1997) ===
In 1995, Carns moved to Portland, Oregon to play keyboards with the CeBe Barnes Band, which included singer and future filmmaker Miranda July, guitarist Shannon Tragedy (later known as Radio Sloan) and Sleater-Kinney drummer Toni Gogin. Pioneers in the next wave of queercore, they toured the West Coast with Sleater-Kinney, playing the Santa Barbara Girls Convention. After the band's demise in 1996, Carns and Sloan continued to collaborate with July and named the new line-up the Need, releasing their debut EP, Margie Ruskie Stops Time, on Kill Rock Stars. They toured down the coast to play the Dirtybird Queercore Festival in San Francisco, but July soon left to pursue solo endeavors. The Need continued as a duo and issued a second EP for Kill Rock Stars in 1997, which was followed up with an additional release on Outpunk. That year, Carns and Sloan relocated to Olympia where they signed with Donna Dresch's queercore label Chainsaw Records, who released the Need's self-titled debut studio album.

=== Collaborations and The Need is Dead (1998–1999) ===
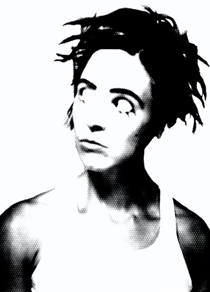
Rachel Carns circa 1999

Before their next album, the Need began branching out into other projects. With singer Nomy Lamm, the duo formed a highly theatrical surf punk drag king band called The Teenage Ho-Dads. They also created a collaborative project where Carns and Sloan, with a rotating cast of players, acted as a karaoke band for guest singers; including Lamm, Tamala Poljak (Longstocking), Audrey Marrs, Tracy Sawyer (Heavens to Betsy) and Slim Moon. The Need released these recordings as Karaneedoke, which would be part of Kill Rock Stars' Mailorder Freak Singles Club. In 1998, Joe Preston briefly joined the Need, playing bass and sampler. The songs "Vaselina" and "Talk Potty" were released as The Need with Joe Preston & DJ Zena on Up Records. During this period Carns played drums with the Sub Debs and later with The Spells. Carns and Sloan both joined Mocket for a short time and appeared on their album Pro Forma. This was followed by the pair collaborating with Two Ton Boa. The Need returned to the studio with producer Mike Lastra in summer 1999 and completed their second album, The Need is Dead, for Chainsaw Records.

=== The Transfused and breakup (2000–2001) ===
Following multiple collaborations, the sense of community involvement, DIY spirit, and willingness to experiment led to the Need's creation of The Transfused, a full-length rock opera, co-written with Lamm. Twelve months in the making, with an original score by Carns and Sloan, a cast of twenty-five, a full backing band, $40,000 in grassroots fundraising, months of rehearsals, and hundreds of volunteers, The Transfused sold out its two-week run at Olympia's Capitol Theater in summer 2000. An album featuring music from the production was released on Yoyo Recordings. The first-ever Ladyfest took place in Olympia later that year; Carns organized and emceed the punk cabaret-style Dude-Looks-Like-A-Lady drag show. Soon after, Sloan relocated to Los Angeles; the Need added a new bass player, Dvin Kirakosian, and for a while Carns spent alternate months in Olympia and LA. However, this only lasted for a short period as the band broke up in 2001, with Carns and Sloan moving on to other projects.

Actors in the production included Nomy Lamm, Andras Jones, Mirah Yom Tov Zeitlyn, Anna "Oxygen" Huff, Zack Carlson and many other Olympians of note.

=== Reformation (2010–present) ===
In 2010, the Need briefly reunited for a handful of benefit shows for their friend (and former Kill Rock Stars employee) Natalie Cox, in order to help with her medical expenses. These shows were held in Seattle and Portland with bills that also featured The Bangles, C Average and Joe Preston's solo project, Thrones. Several years later, the Need reformed for a second time and embarked on a West Coast tour in 2013. Additionally, the band released Resurrection, a compilation album that included previously released songs from all three studio albums, early demo material and compilation tracks. Both the album title and artwork suggest the possibly of continued output, with its cover stating "in which 13 years later the dead doth rise again" and the more blatant "we're baaaaaaack [sic]" exclaimed in the albums' liner notes.

== Additional projects ==
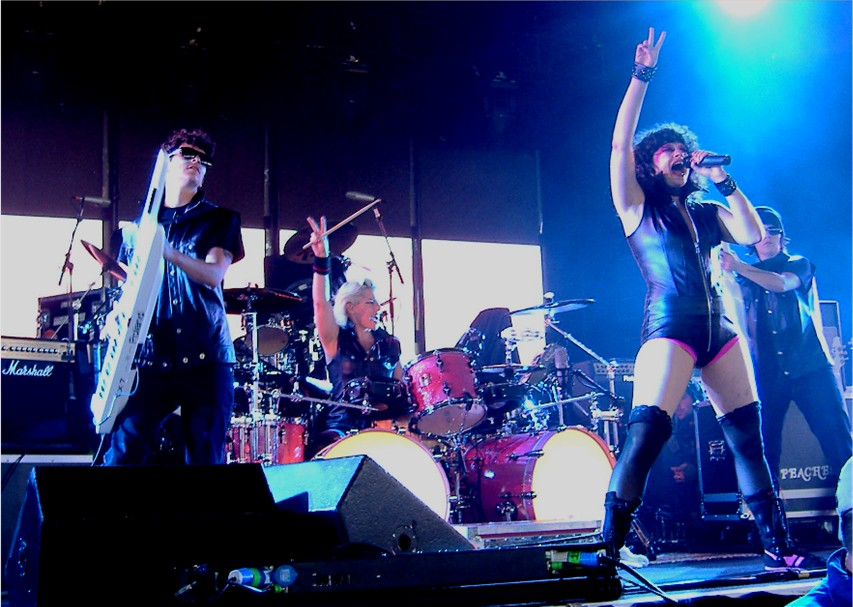
Radio Sloan (far right) performing with Peaches and the Herms in 2006

After the initial break up of the Need in 2001, both members remained active in music; recording, touring and performing with a number of different artists. Radio Sloan formed Circuit Side (named after the opening track from The Need is Dead) who released a self-titled EP, collaborated with Nicole Georges for the band Fact or Fiction and temporarily joined Scarling, filling in on bass for the band's live performances. Rachel Carns formed The King Cobra who played one of their earliest shows at the first ever Homo A Go Go Festival in Olympia in 2002. Following several releases and tours supporting Tracy + the Plastics, Erase Errata and Shoplifting, The King Cobra changed their name to TWIN in 2006. Sloan and Carns also made sample contributions to This Island by Le Tigre and Tracy + the Plastics' Culture for Pigeon, respectively. Sloan and drummer Samantha Maloney collaborated in two touring groups; The Chelsea, who acted as the backing band for Courtney Love after the release of her solo debut America's Sweetheart, as well as The Herms, a band created to support Peaches, following release of her album Impeach My Bush. In 2009, Transfused alumni Anna Oxygen commissioned Carns and Sloan to compose music for Under Polaris, a multimedia performance art piece by experimental theater group Cloud Eye Control.

== Discography ==
=== Studio albums ===
- The Need (1997) Chainsaw Records
- The Need is Dead (1999) Chainsaw Records
- The Transfused^{[I]} (2000) Yoyo Recordings

=== Compilation albums ===
- Resurrection (2013) self released

=== Extended plays and singles ===
- Margie Ruskie Stops Time^{[II]} (1996) Kill Rock Stars
- The Need (1997) Kill Rock Stars
- Jacky O'Lantern (1997) Outpunk
- Karaneedoke (1998) Kill Rock Stars^{[III]}
- The Need with Joe Preston & DJ Zena (1998) Up Records

=== Compilation and soundtrack appearances ===
Year	Title	Song(s)	Label
1997	Destination	"Sam"	Ross Records
1998	Yoyo A Go Go: Another Live Compilation	"Crown" (Live)	Yoyo Recordings
1998	Up Next	"Vaselina"	Up Records
1999	La Foresta Della Morte Soundtrack	"Talk Potty"	ToYo Records
1999	New Women's Music Sampler	"Girl Flavor Gum"	Mr. Lady Records
1999	Homocore Minneapolis: Live and Loud	"Vaselina" (Live), "Crown" (Live), "Majesty" (Live)	Lefty Records
1999	Projector: Another Studio Compilation	"American Woman"	Yoyo Recordings
1999	Asteroids	"Sam" (Live)	Dead Turtle Recordings
2000	Group Motion Picture Soundtrack	"Mona Tinsley", "2-Story Girl"	Yoyo Recordings
2000	Yoyo A Go Go 1999	"Dark Sally" (Live)	Yoyo Recordings
2001	Charm Motion Picture Soundtrack	"Jolly Roger"	5 Rue Christine
2001	The Structure of Scientific Misconceptions	"Resurrection", "The Green Manalishi"	ToYo Records
2001	Home Alive Compilation II: Flying Side Kick	"The Frayed Ends of Sanity"	Broken Rekids
2001	US Pop Life Vol. 12: Tribute to Fort Thunder	"2-Story Girl" (Live)	Contact Records

- IReleased by The Need with Nomy Lamm.
- IIReleased by Miranda July with The Need.
- IIIPart of Kill Rock Stars' Mailorder Freak Singles Club.
