= Tollbooth Gallery =

Coordinates: 47.25354°N 122.44008°W

The Tollbooth Gallery was a site-specific exhibition space and project of the nonprofit arts organization ArtRod launched in 2003 and located in Tacoma, Washington. The project featured contemporary art on view 24 hours a day and seven days a week. The aim of the Tollbooth was to offer dynamic and challenging installation and video art in an outdoor urban setting. Tollbooth Gallery was created and curated by Jared Pappas-Kelley and Michael Lent.

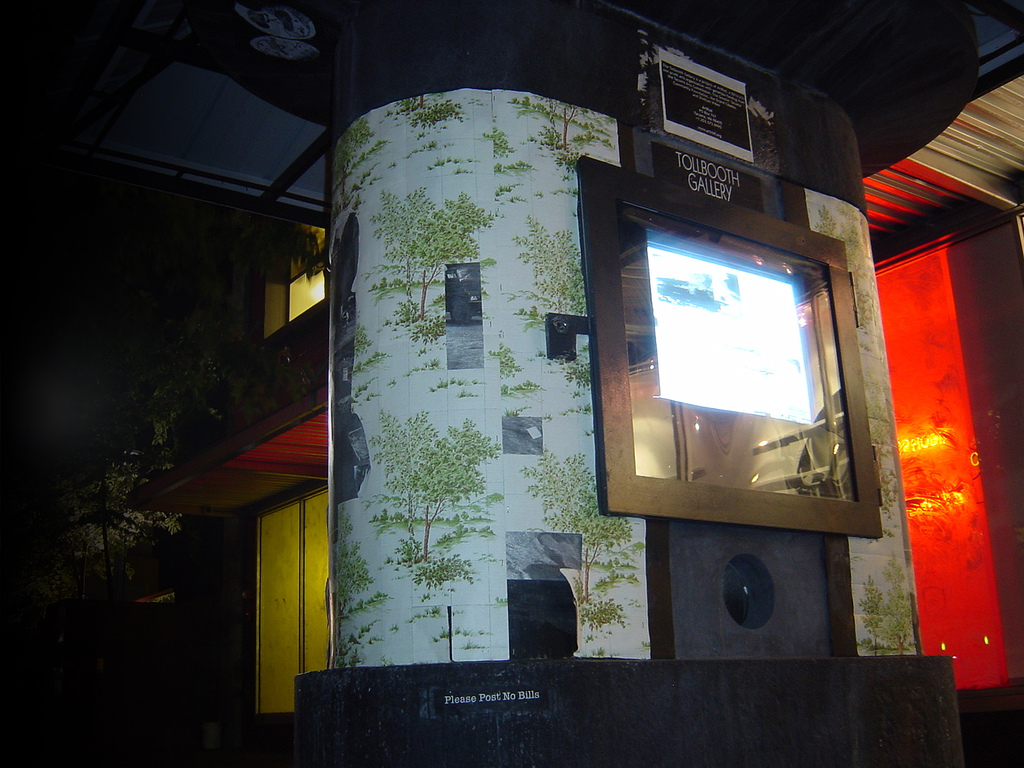
An exhibition at the Tollbooth Gallery in 2004

For each exhibition an artist or artist team was commissioned and tasked with the realization of their project at the site, while taking advantage of the freestanding concrete structure. Art critic Regina Hackett characterized the project as “mind-expanding art packed into cramped quarters” and described the approach as: “Art that is eager to wrestle with reality.” Hackett noted: “What it lacks in space, it achieves in time,” and “on top of that, it's fabulous.”

The Tollbooth commissioned eight exhibitions per year, focusing on varied approaches and engagement with the site and viewer, with an emphasis on video art, time-based work, photography, printmaking, and installation art. The gallery’s stated mission was to bring video and gallery work outside of the traditional museum setting, challenging artists and audience to approach site in different ways. Participant and curator Fionn Meade described the Tollbooth site as a “challenging space to work with but in a good way,” commenting that “the limitations of a format make you be more decisive.” This decisive approach to exhibiting contemporary art allowed the Tollbooth Gallery to program work that might be considered “edgier,” which was furthered by the temporary nature of the commissions. As the journal Public Art Review noted, the project benefited from the “dynamics” of its temporary exhibitions as they allowed for experimentation and “delivered on a short timeline.”

Over the years the Tollbooth Gallery was selected by Museum of Contemporary Art, Los Angeles to be included as part of their curriculum, presented as part of the panel Conduit to Contemporary Art at Americans for the Arts National Conference, and Make Your Own: Art in and out of Cologne at Henry Art Gallery. A catalogue of the first year of exhibitions at Tollbooth Gallery was subsequently published as Toby Room 10.

The Tollbooth Gallery was one of four major projects of the art organization ArtRod, which included Critical Line - an exhibition center, the publication Toby Room, and the film and video series Don’t Bite the Pavement.

== Exhibiting artists ==
- Wynne Greenwood (Tracy and the Plastics)
- Jared Pappas-Kelley
- Michael Lent
- Bill Daniel
- David Lester
- Fionn Meade
- Bridget Irish
- Denise Smith (Baggett)
- Rankin Renwick
- Josh MacPhee
- Justseed's Celebrate People's History Project
- Tim Sullivan
- Patrick Rock
- Alex Schweder
- Lauren Steinhardt
- The Danish art collective Femmes Regionales
- Kevin Haas
- Ido Fluk
