= I'm with Her (song) =

Single by Le Tigre
- Released: October 19, 2016
- Studio: Oscilloscope Studio, NYC (vocals)
- Genre: Electronic; electropop
- Length: 4:46
- Label: Le Tigre
- Songwriters: Kathleen Hanna; Johanna Fateman; JD Samson
- Producer: Le Tigre

Le Tigre singles chronology
"After Dark" (2005)	"I'm with Her" (2016)

Music video
- "I'm With Her" on YouTube

"I'm with Her" is a song by American electroclash trio Le Tigre, released on October 19, 2016. It is the band's first single in eleven years following "After Dark" in 2005. The song was released as a one-off single in support of Democratic presidential candidate Hillary Clinton, and her unsuccessful 2016 Presidential campaign. The song also takes swipes at the Republican presidential nominee Donald Trump, who would be elected President of the United States two weeks after the song's release. The song's title was a campaign slogan for Clinton.

== Background ==
Following a year-long tour in support of their third album This Island, Le Tigre went on a hiatus in 2007, citing exhaustion from touring and the band members "wanting to do their own thing". For the next nine years, while the band members collaborated in varying capacities, the band's activity was minimal outside of reuniting in 2010 to produce Christina Aguilera's "My Girls".

On September 30, 2016, Kathleen Hanna revealed on the Talkhouse Music Podcast that Le Tigre had recorded a new song, with a planned release of mid-October. Hanna also clarified that the song was a one-off, and a reunion of Le Tigre was not planned.

== Composition and lyrics ==
"I'm with Her" has been described as an electropop song, and significantly more polished than Le Tigre's earlier songs.

"I'm with Her" was initially composed by JD Samson and Johanna Fateman and offered to a musical artist; when the offer did not go through, it was offered to Kathleen Hanna. Hanna then suggested the song could be used for a tampon commercial due to its upbeat nature. After receiving no offers, the band re-adjusted the song to make it a song promoting Hillary Clinton and her campaign for the US presidency. The song's title was the unofficial campaign slogan used by Hillary Clinton during her campaign. An early title for the song was "Blue Steel".

== Release ==
"I'm with Her" was released on October 19, 2016, the same date as the third 2016 Presidential Debate, and exactly 12 years after the release of the band's last studio album, This Island.

=== Music video ===
The official music video for "I'm with Her" was released through Pitchfork's YouTube channel the same day. The video features the bandmembers in various locations, and the video ends with a message asking to vote on November 8, 2016. As of May 2022, the video has 566,000 views. Shortly after the song's release, Fateman turned off the video's likes and comment section, due to repeated hate speech and slurs in the comments. "We've gotten all this pushback like we're trying to silence the voices of people who are critical of Hillary Clinton or voting Green Party or whatever. That wasn't the case. It's like actually we're filtering words like cunt and bitch," she said to Vice. "You'd be surprised how many Jill Stein supporters also use gender slurs and make age jokes. It's actually very disturbing to see the unacceptable hate speech emerging from Hillary's critics from the right and from the left."

== Personnel ==
Credits per the official music video.

Le Tigre

- Kathleen Hanna – vocals, production
- Johanna Fateman – vocals, production
- JD Samson – vocals, production

Production

- Alex Suarez – mixing
- Andre Kelman – recording (vocals)

Music video

- Laura Parnes – director
- Tanya Selvaratnam – producer
- Ana Wolovick – effects editor
- Jordan Freeman – assistant editor
