= 2 Nice Girls =

Studio album by Two Nice Girls
- Released: 1989
- Genre: Country rock
- Length: 48:00
- Label: Rough Trade

Two Nice Girls chronology
2 Nice Girls (1989)	Like a Version (1990)

Professional ratings
Review scores
Source	Rating
Hi-Fi News & Record Review	A:1/2

2 Nice Girls was the self-titled debut album of Two Nice Girls, released on Rough Trade Records in 1989. This album contains the track "I Spent My Last $10 (On Birth Control & Beer)" which gained the group some commercial success. The album also features the track "Sweet Jane (With Affection)" that combines The Velvet Underground's "Sweet Jane" with Joan Armatrading's "Love and Affection".

The album was re-released in 2007 and received a 4-star review from the Austin Chronicle.

== Track listing ==
1. The Sweet Postcard (Barbara Hofrenning/Gretchen Phillips)
2. Follow Me (Jane Siberry)
3. Goons (Phillips)
4. Money (Laurie Freelove)
5. I Spent My Last $10 On Birth Control & Beer (Phillips)
6. Sweet Jane (With Affection) (L. Reed/J. Armatrading)
7. My Heart Crawls Off (Phillips/Sara Hickman)
8. Looking Out (Freelove)
9. Heaven On Earth (Freelove)
10. Kick (Freelove)
11. The Holland Song (Kathy Korniloff)
12. Getting Close (CD reissue bonus track)
13. Cristi's Song (CD reissue bonus track)

"The Holland Song" was omitted from initial vinyl and cassette releases save for the UK release; all CD releases of the album reinstate it as the closing track.

== Personnel ==
- Gretchen Phillips – guitar, bass, mandolin & vocals
- Kathy Korniloff – guitar, bass, violin, percussion & vocals
- Laurie Freelove – guitar, bass, percussion & vocals
