= Radio Sloan =

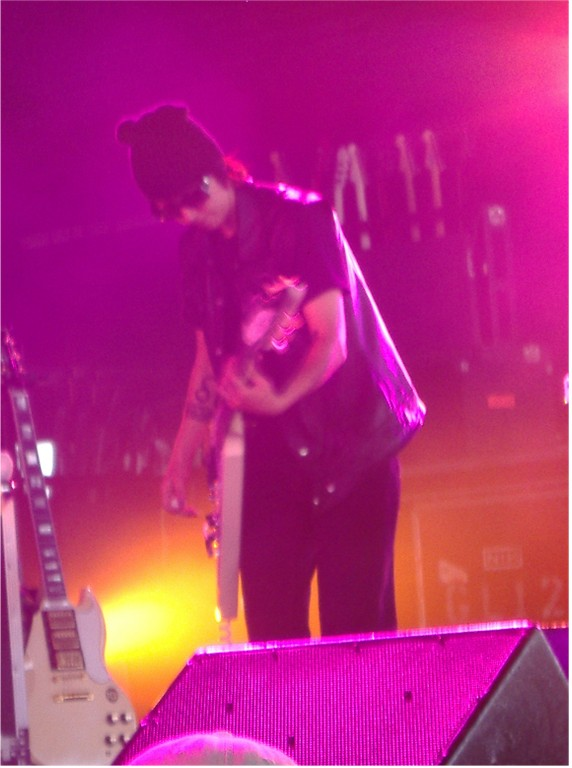
- Radio Sloan in 2006.

Background information
- Occupation: Musician
- Instrument: Guitar
- Labels: Yoyo Records; Mr. Lady Records; Kill Rock Stars; Chainsaw Records

Radio Sloan is a musician from Olympia, Washington.

They are best known as a guitarist for The Need, the band they formed with Rachel Carns. In 2022, they formed Sky Lions with longtime friend and vocalist, Outer Stace. Releasing their first album in 2023. Their other bands include CeBe Barns Band, The Circuit Side, Fact or Fiction, Grandpa's Ghost Stories; and Courtney Love's short-lived all-female backing band The Chelsea along with Lisa Leveridge, Emilie Autumn, Dvin Kirakosian, and Samantha Maloney. They appeared as a guest with Los Angeles band Scarling., with whom they played bass guitar. They are also a member of Electroclash punk artist Peaches' live band, The Herms with JD Samson and Samantha Maloney.

Radio and singer Kathleen Hanna lived in a women's house at one time called "the Curse". Later, they played guitar on Le Tigre's 2004 album This Island.

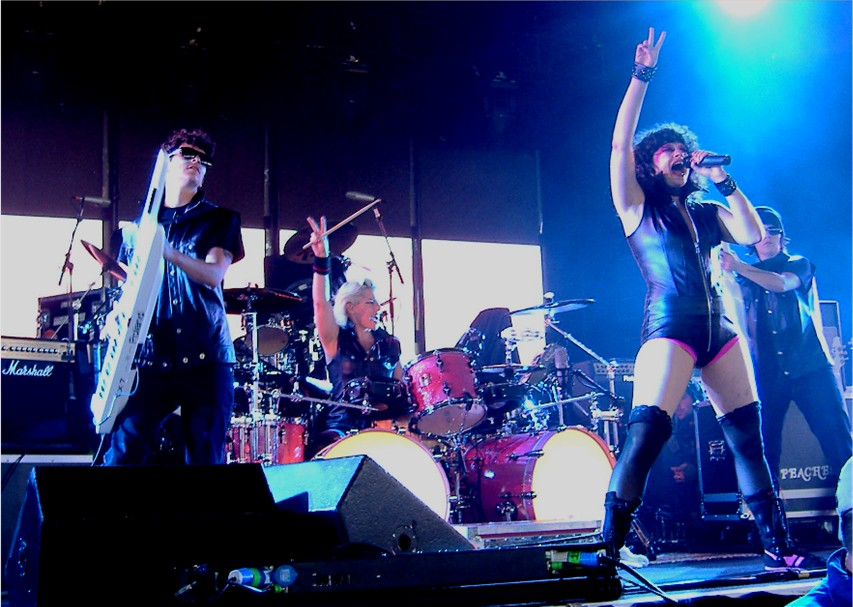
Sloan performing with Peaches and the Herms in 2006.

Radio Sloan is interviewed and appears with The CeBe Barns Band in the 1997 movie She's Real, Worse Than Queer, a documentary by Lucy Thane about women involved in the Queercore scene.

== Discography ==
=== Albums ===
- Margie Ruskie Stops Time Miranda July with music by The Need on Kill Rock Stars (1996)
- "Jacky O' Lantern" 7" single on Outpunk (1997)
- The Need CD on Chainsaw Records (1997)
- The Need 10" EP with Joe Preston and DJ Zeena on Up Records (1998)
- KaraNEEDoke double 7" collaborations with Slim Moon, Nomy Lamm, Audrey Marrs, Tracy Sawyer (formerly of Heavens to Betsy) and Tamala Poljak (formerly of Longstocking) on Kill Rock Stars
- The Transfused by Nomy Lamm with The Need CD on Yoyo Records (2000)
- The Need Is Dead CD on Chainsaw Records (2000)
- This Island CD on Mr. Lady Records (2004)
- VHS only Digital release on Bandcamp (2020)
- Inside the Circle by Sky Lions on Bandcamp (2023)

=== Compilations ===
- "Sam" on Destination 7" Ross Records (1996)
- "Crown" on Yo Yo A Go Go - Another Live Record CD/LP Yoyo Records (1997)
- "Talk Potty" on La Foresta Della Morte Soundtrack CD Toyo Records (1999)
- "Girl Flavour Gum" on The New Women's Music Sampler CD Mr. Lady Records (1999)
- "Vaselina", "Crown", "Majesty" on Homocore Minneapolis: Live & Loud CD Lefty Records (1999)
- "American Woman" on Projector LP Yoyo Records (1999)
- "Resurrection", "The Green Manalishi (With the Two Pronged Crown)" on The Structure of Scientific Misconceptions/The System of Scientific Misconstructions compilation CD Toyo Records (2001)

=== Filmography ===
Jump to filmography as: Soundtrack, Composer

=== Soundtrack ===
- Itty Bitty Titty Committee (2007) (writer: "2 Story Girl")
- Don't Need You (2005) (V) ("Love Thing") aka Don't Need You: The Herstory of Riot Grrrl (USA: DVD box title)

=== Composer ===
- Itty Bitty Titty Committee (2007)
- Starcrossed (2005)
