= Remix (Le Tigre album) =

Remix album by Le Tigre
- Released: 2003
- Genre: Dance-punk
- Label: Mr. Lady (MRLR #24)
- Producers: Chris Stamey, Le Tigre

Le Tigre chronology
Feminist Sweepstakes (2001)	Remix (2003)	This Island (2004)

Remix is a remix album by American dance-punk trio Le Tigre. It was released by Mr. Lady Records in 2001 in the United States. It was reissued on August 24, 2004 with a bonus track.

Pitchfork called the album "just about as standard as remix albums can get", adding that the album's biggest weakness "is that, for the most part, it puts the disco before the discussion." The publication ranked the DFA's remix of "Deceptacon" 226th on its list of the best songs of the 2000s. Out magazine panned the album, writing that "Le Tigre deserves better."

== Track listing ==
1. "Tres Bien" (Nouveau Disco mix)
2. "On Guard" (The En Garde mix)
3. "Mediocrity Rulse" (41 Small Stars mix)
4. "Dyke March 2001" (Reid's Aphro-Dykey mix)
5. "Deceptacon" (DFA rmx)
6. "Much Finer" (The Flaxdalass mix)
7. "Deceptacon" (DFA rmx - long mix vocal) (reissue bonus track)
