= From the Desk of Mr. Lady =

EP by Le Tigre
- Released: January 23, 2001
- Genre: Electroclash
- Length: 17:07
- Label: Mr. Lady

Le Tigre chronology
Le Tigre (1999)	From the Desk of Mr. Lady (2001)	Feminist Sweepstakes (2001)

From the Desk of Mr. Lady is an EP by American feminist electroclash trio Le Tigre.

== In popular culture ==
In 2016, "Mediocrity Rules" was featured in a commercial for Post Foods' Fruity and Cocoa Pebbles.

Professional ratings
Aggregate scores
Source	Rating
Metacritic	(72/100)
Review scores
Source	Rating
Pitchfork	5.0/10
AllMusic	2.5/5 stars
Village Voice	B+
Rolling Stone	3.5/5 stars

== Track listing ==
All tracks are written by Le Tigre.

No.	Title	Length
1.	"Get Off the Internet"	3:35
2.	"Bang! Bang!"	2:33
3.	"They Want Us to Make a Symphony Out of the Sound of Women Swallowing Their Own Tongues"	1:49
4.	"Yr Critique"	2:37
5.	"Gone B4 Yr Home"	2:20
6.	"Mediocrity Rules"	2:01
7.	"All That Glitters" (Rachael Kozak remix)	2:30
Total length:		17:07
