= Critical Line =

Critical Line was a contemporary art exhibition center that opened 5 May 2006 in the St. Helens section of Tacoma, Washington. The 1,800-foot redesigned gallery space specialized in installation art, video, performance, sound art, photography, and time-based work, and was devised to "allow for creative exploration, experimentation, and exhibition in a space where artists are encouraged to take creative risks." The gallery operated in partnership with its satellite project the Tollbooth Gallery, under the direction of Jared Pappas-Kelley alongside Michael Lent, and was one of four major projects of the nonprofit art organization ArtRod. These also included the contemporary art journal Toby Room, and the film and video series Don't Bite the Pavement.

In 2010 an online journal based on the Critical Line exhibition space was launched.

== Past exhibitions ==
- Found Space
- Keeping Score
- Nativity Artists
- New Works: Nicholas Nyland and Ellen Ito
- The End
- Critical Line Invitational
