= Chloe Liked Olivia =

Studio album by Two Nice Girls
- Released: 1991
- Genre: Country rock
- Length: 45:19
- Label: Rough Trade Records

Two Nice Girls chronology
Like a Version (1990)	Chloe Liked Olivia (1991)

Chloe Liked Olivia is the third and final album by Two Nice Girls, released on Rough Trade records in 1991. The label closed down and the band broke up shortly after this album was released. Chicago Tribune critic Dan Kening rated the album 3 stars (out of 4) for its "affecting, eye-opening music worth seeking out", while Mark Jenkins of The Washington Post thought it was "barely distinguishable from most other easy-listening adult-rock" and that the band had been "more fun when they're naughty."

Curve magazine later listed the album as one of "10 albums every lesbian must own" The title is taken from Virginia Woolf's feminist essay "A Room of One's Own".

== Track listing ==
1. Let's Go Bonding (Gretchen Phillips)
2. Eleven (Kathy Korniloff)
3. For The Inauguration (Phillips)
4. Princess Of Power (Phillips)
5. Throw It All Away (Meg Hentges)
6. Rational Heart (Korniloff)
7. The Queer Song (Phillips)
8. Only Today (Barger)
9. Noona's Revenge (Hentges, Judith Ferguson)
10. Swimming In Circles (Barger)

== Personnel ==
- Gretchen Phillips - guitar, bass & vocals
- Kathy Korniloff - guitar, bass & vocals
- Meg Hentges - guitar, bass & vocals
- Pam Barger - drums
