= 3 (The Butchies album) =

Studio album by The Butchies
- Released: 2001
- Genre: Queercore
- Label: Mr. Lady Records
- Producer: Greg Griffith

The Butchies chronology
Population: 1975 (1999)	3 (2001)	Make Yr Life (2004)

Professional ratings
Review scores
Source	Rating
AllMusic	3/5 stars
Robert Christgau	(3-star Honorable Mention)

3 is the third album by queercore band The Butchies, released in 2001.

== Track listing ==
All tracks are written by The Butchies.

No.	Title	Length
1.	"Anything Anthology"	2:55
2.	"Forget Your Calculus"	2:22
3.	"For Kay"	3:05
4.	"Huh Huh Hear"	4:08
5.	"I Hate.com"	3:26
6.	"Not Like Mine"	5:51
7.	"Mandy (1985-2000)"	4:11
8.	"The Wedding Disaster"	3:32
9.	"Junior High Lament"	2:13
Total length:		31:41
