= The Butchies =

American all-female punk rock band

- Origin: Durham, North Carolina, U.S.
- Genres: Punk rock; queercore; riot grrrl; alternative rock
- Years active: 1998–2005
- Labels: Mr. Lady Records, Yep Roc
- Members: Kaia Wilson (vocals, guitar); Alison Martlew (bass); Melissa York (drums)

The Butchies were an all-female punk rock band from Durham, North Carolina, that existed from 1998 to 2005. They reunited from their hiatus to tour with Amy Ray of the Indigo Girls promoting Ray's new album in 2010. The frequent focus of their lyrical content concerned lesbian and queer themes.

Made up of Team Dresch guitarist and frontwoman Kaia Wilson, bassist Alison Martlew, and drummer Melissa York, The Butchies has been referred to as "queercore crusaders". The band has been performing together since the recording of their first album, Are We Not Femme? in 1998. Since then, the trio has recorded three subsequent albums, Population: 1975 in 1999, 3 in 2001, and Make Yr Life in 2004. They have also appeared on a number of compilations of note, including Being Out Rocks, produced by the Human Rights Campaign (Centaur Productions, 2002), and Fields And Streams (Kill Rock Stars, 2002). In 2005 the band announced a hiatus.

The first three albums were released by the now-defunct Mr. Lady Records, run by Kaia Wilson and Tammy Rae Carland. It was named after Wilson's first solo LP, Ladyman, created after leaving Team Dresch. The label also released the first two Le Tigre recordings. Make Yr Life was released by Yep Roc. The track "Sex (I'm a Lesbian)" appeared on Mr. Lady's 1999 sampler album, New Women's Music Sampler. In 2001, a live rendition of the track "Disco" appeared on another sampler album, Calling All Kings & Queens.

Kaia Wilson had previously performed in Adickdid and the queercore band Team Dresch, appearing on their first two albums, Personal Best and Captain My Captain; Melissa York was also in Team Dresch, playing drums on the second LP and, prior to that, performing in two hardcore punk bands, Vitapup and Born Against, before the two women joined with Alison Martlew to form The Butchies.

The Butchies also played on the 2001 Amy Ray (of the Indigo Girls) album Stag on Daemon Records and backed her up on tour.

The band's name appears in the lyrics of the Le Tigre song "Hot Topic."

== Discography ==
Albums

- Are We Not Femme? (1998, Mr. Lady Records)
- Population: 1975 (1999, Mr. Lady Records)
- 3 (2001, Mr. Lady Records)
- Make Yr Life (2004, Yep Roc Records)

Singles

- "Freaks***Athletes"/"Where R We", (2001, Mr. Lady Records)

== See also ==
- List of all-women bands
