= Population: 1975 =

Studio album by The Butchies
- Released: 26 October 1999
- Genre: Queercore
- Label: Mr Lady
- Producer: Chris Stamey

The Butchies chronology
Are We Not Femme? (1998)	Population: 1975 (1999)	3 (2001)

Professional ratings
Review scores
Source	Rating
AllMusic	4/5 stars

Population: 1975 is the second album by the queercore band the Butchies, released in 1999.

== Critical reception ==
The Chicago Tribune called the songs "sonic tapestries woven from nimble bass, alternately lithe/dense guitar and intricate drums."

== Track listing ==
1. "Insult to Injury"
2. "It's Over"
3. "More Rock More Talk"
4. "Movies Movies"
5. "Population 1975
6. "Eleanor
7. "Ms Doolittle
8. "Love in the Hour"
9. "Intro"
10. "Baby DNA"
11. "Gertrude + Stein"
