= I'm with Her =

I'm with Her may refer to:

- I'm with Her (band), an American band
- I'm with Her (TV series), an American TV series
- "I'm with her" (slogan), a campaign slogan from the 2016 Hillary Clinton presidential campaign
- "I'm with Her" (song), a 2016 song by Le Tigre
- "I'm with Her", a song by Rhett Miller from The Believer
