= Fawn Krieger =

Fawn Krieger (born May 8, 1975) is an American interdisciplinary artist who creates discrete sculptures and immersive multi-media environments individually and sometimes in collaboration with other artists and performers, including Neal Medlyn, Tracy + the Plastics, Edwin Torres, and Anna Oxygen.

Often working with a mix of industrial and domestic materials, video and performance, Krieger’s work deals with actions around touch, memory, rupture, and transference as grounds for recovery and re-imagination. Sourcing histories and systems of communal values within material culture, Krieger’s work functions as speculative object-theatres and artifacts, recording corporeal and tactile impressions of social impact, exchange, and revolution.

Krieger’s work has been commissioned and installed at numerous venues, including The Kitchen, Art in General, Nice & Fit Gallery, The Moore Space, Von Lintel Gallery, Galerie West, Soloway Gallery, Rose Art Museum at Brandeis University, Portland Institute for Contemporary Art, Human Resources Los Angeles, Fleisher-Ollman Gallery, and Lambretto ArtProject

Krieger was born in Port Jefferson, NY, and currently lives in New York City. She received a Bachelor of Fine Arts from Parsons School of Design, and a Master of Fine Arts from Bard College’s Milton Avery Graduate School of the Arts. Krieger's work has been written about in The New York Times, Sculpture Magazine, Artforum, Art in America, BOMB, as well as The Brooklyn Rail, and she is the recipient of a Louis Comfort Tiffany Foundation Award, an Art Matters Foundation Grant, and a Jerome Foundation grant. Krieger has taught in the art departments of Virginia Commonwealth University and Adelphi University.

== Publications ==
Krieger, Fawn (2009). COMPANY (Vol. XV ed.). New York: Art In General. p. 192. ISBN 1934890154.

Torres, Edwin (2019). The Body in Language. Counterpath Press. p. 360. ISBN 1933996722.

Boris, Staci (2008). The New Authentics. Spertus. ISBN 0935982655.
