= Don't Bite the Pavement =

Don't Bite the Pavement is a series of contemporary art exhibitions showcasing installation art, expanded video, and experimental film, which toured the west coast of the United States, Canada, and the United Kingdom.

== Biography ==
The Don't Bite the Pavement series began in 1999 in Olympia, Washington and eventually became a project of the organisation ArtRod. Each installment was loosely focused around an idea or theme and showcased innovative work by artists from around the world within the field of video art, expanded media, microcinema, or installation art; providing a space for this work to be presented and creating dialogues between the site and the larger community. Around this time, artists and writers also began documenting and discussing this work in a recurring column likewise called Don't Bite the Pavement, which regularly featured interviews and articles in the journal Toby Room.

With each installment of the video series, Don't Bite the Pavement sought to create exhibitions that "engaged and challenged the community", while providing space and resources where artists could exhibit new work and develop novel approaches and projects.

== Reception ==
Artforum contributor Emily Hall wrote that the project was "pulling together some of the most challenging and interesting work happening around Seattle" adding: "Let that be a modest but powerful lesson to all the naysayers and whiners who complain that innovative work isn't happening here."

Artist Lauren Steinhart characterized the project as:

"Each gathering of Don't Bite the Pavement was a chance for artists and viewers to gather, interact, and to show and discuss their work both completed and in-progress. In this way, DBtP became an integral and vital part of the arts community."

Early events included work by artists Wynne Greenwood (Tracy + the Plastics), Denise Baggett (Smith), Jared Pappas-Kelley, Tim Sullivan, Anna Jordan Huff (Anna Oxygen), Cathy de la Cruz, Nathan Howdeshell (from the band the Gossip), April Levy, Michael Lent, Jason Gutz, Devon Damonte, Lauren Steinhart, Bryan Connolly, Bridget Irish, and has also included work by David Blandy and George Kuchar with the average screening consisting of pieces by emerging and established artists.
