= Culture for Pigeon =

Studio album by Tracy + the Plastics
- Released: 2004
- Label: Troubleman Unlimited Records

Tracy + the Plastics chronology
Muscler's Guide to Videonics (2001)	Culture for Pigeon (2004)

Culture for Pigeon is the third official release from Tracy + the Plastics and the band's second full-length album. It was released in 2004 on Troubleman Unlimited. Culture for Pigeon includes a DVD with two of Wynne Greenwood's video pieces which bridges the gap between listening to a CD of Tracy + the Plastics and attending one of their richer multimedia concerts. The album was engineered by Joel Hamilton.

== Track listing ==
=== Disc one (audio CD) ===
1. "Big Stereo" – 2:47
2. "Knit a Claw" – 2:59
3. "Henrietta" – 2:33
4. "Happens" – 3:32
5. "Save Me Claude" – 2:04
6. "Quaasars" – 3:06
7. "Cut Glass See Thru" – 1:07
8. "Oh Birds" – 2:03
9. "This is Dog-City" – 2:27
10. "What You Still Want" – 2:13
11. "+ Mountain" – 0:55

=== Disc two (DVD video) ===
1. "We Hear Swooping Guitars (Tracy + the Practice)"
2. "Just the Beginning of Something (Maybe this Will Explain Some Relations)"
