= Gretchen Phillips =

American singer-songwriter (born 1963)

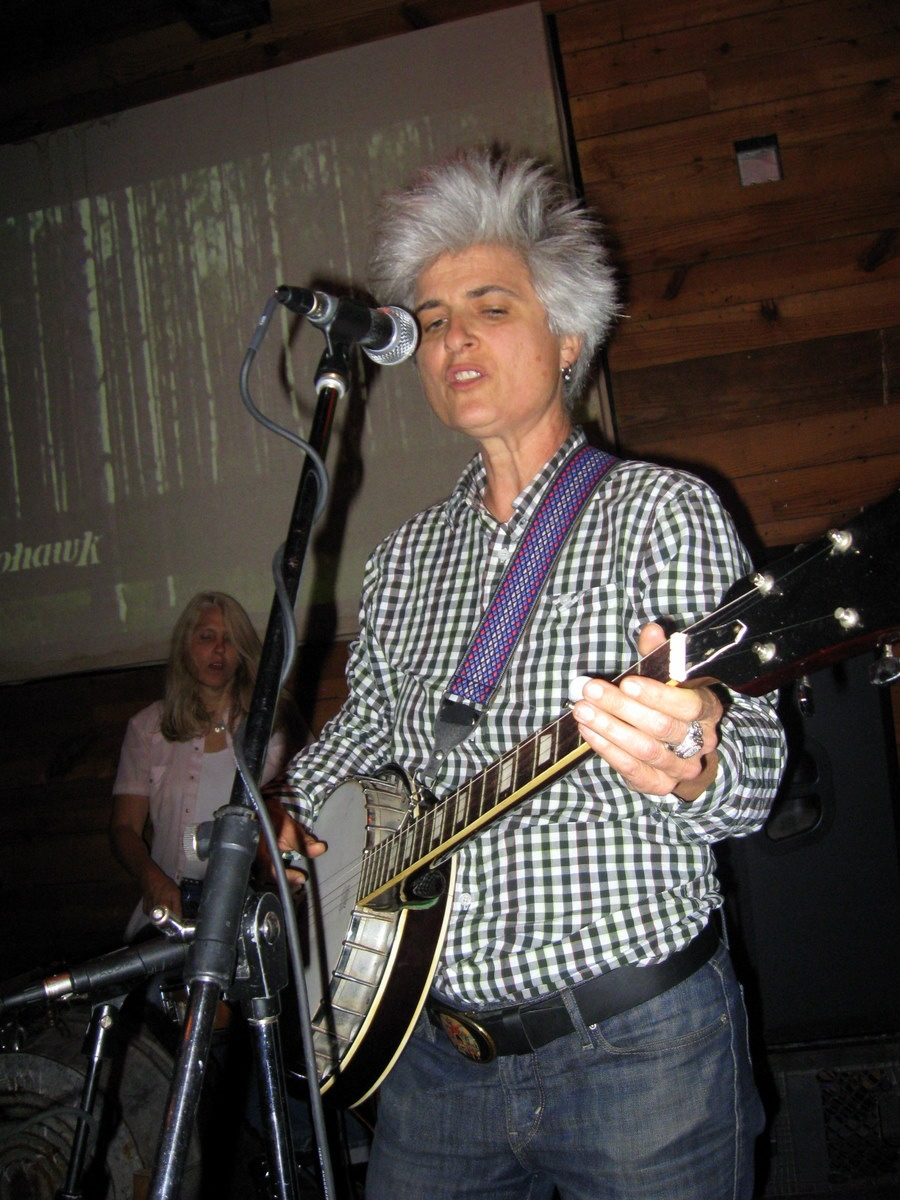
- Phillips in 2011

Background information
- Born: 1963 (age 62–63); Galveston, Texas
- Genres: Folk, riot grrrl
- Instruments: Vocals, guitar, banjo
- Years active: 1981–present
- Website: gretchen-phillips.com

Gretchen Phillips (born 1963) is an American singer-songwriter known for her humorous and topical songs. Phillips has been openly gay throughout her life and her lesbianism has inspired much of her material.

== Background ==
Phillips grew up in Houston. Her parents were musicians, and she played music from childhood. After graduating from the High School for Performing and Visual Arts, she decided to move to Austin in 1981 to become a professional performer and was in a band with Sara Hickman.

== Meat Joy, Girls in the Nose, and Two Nice Girls ==
Phillips was a member in three influential area bands in the mid-eighties: the punk band Meat Joy (with Jamie Lee Hendrix, Melissa Cobb Unit, John Hawkes-under the name John Boy Perkins, and Tim Pierre Mateer), the rock band Girls in the Nose (with Pam Barger, Kay Turner, Joanna Labow, and Darcee Douglas), and the country/disco/rock/folk/pop band Two Nice Girls (with Pam Barger, Laurie Freelove, Meg Hentges, and Kathy Korniloff). Two Nice Girls attracted national attention with Phillips' song "I Spent My Last $10 (on Birth Control and Beer)" which satirized heterosexual relationships.

== Bands and solo projects since Two Nice Girls ==
Since the break-up of Two Nice Girls, Phillips has been part of The Gretchen Phillips Experience (with Andy Loomis, Thor Harris, John Paul Keenon, and Jo Walston), Dusty Trails (with Josephine Wiggs and Vivian Trimble), Phillips & Driver (with David Driver), Lord Douglas Phillips (with Terri Lord and Darcee Douglas), and The Gretchen Phillips Ministries (with the Experience line-up), as well as performing as a solo artist.

== Awards ==
Two Nice Girls won a GLAAD Media Award in 1991. Phillips was inducted into the Austin Chronicle Music Poll's Hall of Fame in 2001.

== Personal life ==
Phillips has been openly gay throughout her life and her lesbianism has inspired much of her material. Phillips has generally resided in Austin, but has also lived in San Francisco and New York City.

== Other ==
An archive collected by Phillips, including items such as reviews and news articles, video recordings of her shows, and fan mail, is part of Cornell University Library's Human Sexuality Collection.

Her name appears in the lyrics of the Le Tigre song "Hot Topic."

== Discography ==
- The Many Moods of Meat Joy – Meat Joy
- Chant to the Full Moon, O Ye Sisters – Girls in the Nose
- Girls in the Nose – Girls in the Nose
- Meat Joy – Meat Joy
- 2 Nice Girls – Two Nice Girls
- Like a Version – Two Nice Girls
- chloe liked olivia – Two Nice Girls
- Songs to Save Your Soul – Gretchen Phillips
- A Taste of LDP – Lord Douglas Phillips
- Seitan is Real – The Gretchen Phillips Ministries
- Togetherness – Phillips & Driver
- Welcome to mMy World – Gretchen Phillips
- Welcome to My World and a Half – Gretchen Phillips
- Do You Ever Wish For More? – Gretchen Phillips
- "Eau Du Lesbianism" appeared on Mr. Lady Records' sampler album, Calling All Kings & Queens, in 2001
