= New Women's Music Sampler =

Compilation album by Various artists
- Released: October 26, 1999
- Genre: Alternative rock
- Length: 39:35
- Label: Mr. Lady

Mr. Lady Records sampler chronology
New Women's Music Sampler (1999)	Calling All Kings & Queens (2001)

Professional ratings
Review scores
Source	Rating
Allmusic	link

New Women's Music Sampler is a sampler album of alternative rock songs by artists on the San Francisco, California based lesbian-feminist independent record label, Mr. Lady Records. It was released in October 1999. A second sampler was released in 2001, entitled Calling All Kings & Queens.

== Track listing ==
1. The Moves: "Heavenly Creatures" – 3:29
2. The Need: "Girl Flavor Gum" – 1:55
3. The Butchies: "Sex (I'm a Lesbian)" – 3:03
4. Retsin: "Pink River" – 2:58
5. Tami Hart: "Wait for Me Now" – 4:05
6. Kittypryde & Her Shadowcats: "Dirt, Baby" – 2:24
7. Tribe 8: "What the Paper's Didn't Say" – 2:22
8. The Haggard: "Feminist Bullshit" – 2:52
9. Sarah Dougher: "Fall Down" – 3:21
10. Doria Roberts: "Perfect" – 3:43
11. Rubéo: "Movie Star" – 2:38
12. Kaia: "Insomnia" – 6:45
