= Make Yr Life =

Studio album by The Butchies
- Released: 2004
- Genres: Queercore, pop punk
- Label: Yep Roc Records
- Producer: Greg Griffith

The Butchies chronology
3 (2001)	Make Yr Life (2004)

Make Yr Life is the fourth album by the American lesbian queercore band the Butchies, released in 2004. It was the band's final album.

== Production ==
The album was produced by Greg Griffith; the band worked for two and half years on the songs, and spent 10 days recording them. The Butchies set out to make a poppier album.

The band had been playing "17" in concert for years, and recorded the song after it had become a fan favorite.

== Critical reception ==
Professional ratings
Review scores
Source	Rating
AllMusic	4/5 stars
Robert Christgau	(3-star Honorable Mention)
Orlando Sentinel	3/5 stars

The Washington Post thought that "such thumping new songs as 'Trouble' and 'She's So Lovely' demonstrate that the band has lost none of its swagger, but overall this disc is the band's poppiest outing." The Advocate declared that "Kaia Wilson, Melissa York, and Alison Martlew are undisputed masters of the two- to three-minute power-punk anthem." The Orlando Sentinel concluded that "even when the lyrics lean toward melodrama, Wilson's slashing guitar combines with the rumbling rhythms of bassist Alison Martlew and drummer Melissa York to make words inconsequential."

The Chicago Reader wrote that "though York’s stick work is still hard and nimble, Make Yr Life feels a bit less punk than the Butchies’ first three records, as if they were dialing it back to show off their songwriting–which is chewier than ever." The Morning Call determined that "where some may have turned to a cover of The Outfield's 'Your Love' for its nostalgic value, The Butchies make it their own, providing the album with a sexually heated closing track that is deliriously dramatic."

AllMusic wrote that "the band's quiet, drastic reworking of the Outfield's 1985 pop hit 'Your Love' just may be the cover version of the year."

== Track listing ==
All songs composed by the Butchies, except as noted.

1. "Send Me You"
2. "Trouble"
3. "Make Yr Life"
4. "Second Guess"
5. "She's So Lovely"
6. "Everything + Everywhere"
7. "17"
8. "Lydia"
9. "Tell the Others"
10. "Your Love" (John Spinks)
