= Michael Lent (visual artist) =

British–American artist, curator, and researcher

Michael Lent is a British–American visual artist, academic, curator and researcher. He studied at Tyler School of Art of Temple University where he received a BFA, and earned his MFA at Goddard College supervised by sound artist Andrea Parkins, and his PhD at the University of Lincoln.

== Visual art ==
Michael Lent utilises drawing, installation, text, and video in his visual art, which often focuses on a documentation of ephemeral spaces, landscape, and conceptual spaces in studio. His work has been described as: "a daring blend of text, sound and image", in the journal TriQuarterly, which summarized his approach with:

"Lent calls our attention to the construction of the work itself and engages us not just in concerns of the historical world but in the difficulty of representing the experience of it."

This notion of the difficulty of representing experience is recurring in Lent's work, and is also prevalent in much of his research as an interest in alterity and an investigation of an experience of the world alongside perceptions of the world as Other.

Lent has exhibited internationally, including at Bluecoat in Liverpool, MASS MoCA in Massachusetts, and Albright–Knox Art Gallery in New York City. He has also been the recipient of various awards, including funding from the New York Foundation for the Arts.

== Research ==
Michael Lent’s research focuses on location and the intersection between space and place. He asserts that the way we approach and experience the world, in fact leads “to a spatial disappearance into place.” In both his research and visual practice, Lent attempts to court this dissolution as an attempt to “uncover and produce an imagining of space” as an investigation into the experience of site without “hastening its dissolution.” Through this he examines alterity as a method for avoiding this dissolution whilst preserving the unknown in space “as an act towards singularity.”

Michael Lent’s research has been presented at the Royal Geographical Society, Americans for the Arts, University of Minho, in Portugal, and Bahçeşehir University, in Istanbul. His work is to be published by Routledge in an upcoming volume alongside other writers such as Victor Burgin and Stephen Bann. In Lent’s book Courting Dissolution, he examines what role art has in colonization and subsequent dissolution. In the London School of Economics Book Review it was characterised as taking “up the problem of space and spatiality as it emerges in the context of a world defined by globalisation and capitalist over-production,” and observed it “brings together an astute and astonishing array of theoretical sources to make sense of a world increasingly defined by globalisation and capitalist over-production.”

== Projects and curation ==
Lent was the creator and publisher of Toby Room, a journal that featured interviews and original work by contemporary artists and writers. In 2002, he and fellow artist Jared Pappas-Kelley created the arts organization ArtRod, which encompassed both the public media Tollbooth Gallery project as well as Critical Line art centre, which has since been reimagined as an online project.
