= ArtRod =

ArtRod is a nonprofit arts organization located in Tacoma, Washington. It was founded in 1958 and went through several incarnations including Allied Arts and Artists Exchange. The mission of ArtRod is to facilitate art exhibition in nontraditional public arenas and grew out of a response to bring contemporary art forms from a traditional museum setting and directly into the community's path.

ArtRod has supported four major projects: Toby Room magazine, the Don't Bite the Pavement film series, and the exhibition spaces Tollbooth Gallery and Critical Line. The organisation has been a collaboration between Michael Lent and Jared Pappas-Kelley. In 2005 they were honoured with an arts genius award from the City of Tacoma for their work on ArtRod and the Tollbooth Gallery.
