= Like a Version (EP) =

Like A Version

EP by Two Nice Girls
- Released: 1990
- Genre: Country rock
- Length: 26:13
- Label: Rough Trade

Two Nice Girls chronology
2 Nice Girls (1989)	Like A Version (1990)	Chloe Liked Olivia (1991)

Like A Version is a 1990 EP from Two Nice Girls, the group's second release. The EP included a rerelease of the band's best-known song from its debut album, the satirical "I Spent My Last $10 (on Birth Control and Beer)", and five covers.

== Critical reception ==
Joe Brown of The Washington Post praised the "quietly stunning, punningly titled EP," and Patty Gettelman of the Orlando Sentinel gave it a four-star review. Like a Version was named best Texas EP at the 1990–1991 Austin Music Awards.

== Track listing ==
1. "I Feel (Like Makin') Love" (Donna Summer/Bad Company cover)
2. "Bang Bang" (Janis and her Boyfriends cover)
3. "Top of the World" (Carpenters cover)
4. "Speed Racer" (Speed Racer TV theme song cover)
5. "Cotton Crown" (Sonic Youth cover)
6. "I Spent My Last $10 (On Birth Control & Beer)" (Gretchen Phillips)

Some printings have "Scottish Air & Quickstep" as track 6.

== Personnel ==
- Gretchen Phillips – guitar, bass & vocals
- Kathy Korniloff – guitar, bass & vocals
- Meg Hentges – guitar, bass & vocals
- Pam Barger – drums
