= Calling All Kings & Queens =

Compilation album by Various artists
- Released: March 20, 2001
- Genre: Alternative rock
- Length: 58:50
- Label: Mr. Lady

Various artists chronology
New Women's Music Sampler (1999)	Calling All Kings & Queens (2001)

Professional ratings
Review scores
Source	Rating
Allmusic	3/5 stars

Calling All Kings & Queens is a sampler album of alternative rock songs by artists on the San Francisco, California based lesbian-feminist independent record label, Mr. Lady Records. It was released in March, 2001, following on from the label's first sampler released in 1999, entitled New Women's Music Sampler.

== Track listing ==
1. California Lightening: "Lugosi" – 2:53
2. Le Tigre: "Sweetie" – 2:45
3. Navy: "Safe Harbors" – 3:13
4. Amy Ray: "Lucy Stoners" (live) – 4:02
5. Darien Brahms: "Whistle Boat" – 3:09
6. Kiki and Herb: "I'm Not Waiting" (Sleater-Kinney) – 2:13
7. Sleater-Kinney:"Ballad of a Ladyman" (live) – 3:05
8. The Sissies: "Everything in the World" – 2:10
9. Heart Beats Red: "Set Me Up" – 2:28
10. PME: "Cherries in the Snow" – 3:38
11. The Crowns: "Shallow End" – 2:36
12. The Butchies: "Disco" (live) – 3:08
13. Tracy + the Plastics: "Oh Maria" – 2:27
14. Origami: "Nancy Drew/Lions & Tigers" – 3:05
15. Shelley Doty: "Seems Unlikely" – 4:14
16. oriflamme: "My Own Private Ryan" – 2:35
17. V for Vendetta: "The Fall of Terrok Nor" – 4:54
18. Gretchen Phillips: "Eau Du Lesbianism" – 6:15
