= Two Nice Girls =

American rock band

- Two Nice Girls

Background information
- Origin: Austin, Texas
- Genres: Country rock, folk rock
- Years active: 1985–1992
- Label: Rough Trade Records
- Past members: Gretchen Phillips; Kathy Korniloff; Laurie Freelove; Meg Hentges; Pam Barger

Two Nice Girls were a self-styled "dyke rock" band from Austin, Texas, featuring singer-songwriter Gretchen Phillips. They were together from 1985 to 1992, releasing three albums on Rough Trade Records.

== History ==
The group formed in 1985, originally the duo of Gretchen Phillips and Kathy Korniloff, who won the Austin "Sweet Jane" festival, their version of the Lou Reed song later combined with Joan Armatrading's "Love and Affection" for their single release "Sweet Jane (With Affection)" in 1989.

Within a year, the lineup had expanded to comprise Phillips (guitar, bass, mandolin, and vocals), Korniloff (guitar, bass, violin, percussion, vocals), and Laurie Freelove (guitar, bass, percussion, and vocals). Members each wrote songs and took turns on different instruments. The band's debut album, 2 Nice Girls, released in 1989 included "Sweet Jane" and a cover version of Jane Siberry's "Follow Me", as well as eight originals. Freelove left following completion of the band's first album in 1989 to pursue a solo career. She was replaced by Meg Hentges. Drummer Pam Barger was added to the band for a tour to promote the album. In 1990 they released the mostly covers mini-album Like a Version, and followed this with Chloe Liked Olivia in 1991.

Common themes in their songs included lesbianism, often using satire and humour, with their music often described as folk rock.

Two Nice Girls won a GLAAD Media Award in 1991. The group broke up in 1992.

Hentges went on to release an EP and two albums. Phillips recorded several self-released albums and formed other bands. Korniloff moved to Los Angeles to pursue a career in sound design and music for motion pictures. Barger moved to Seattle and joined The Billy Tipton Memorial Saxophone Quartet.

According to the band's website, Laurie Freelove died on January 22, 2017.

== Discography ==
=== Albums ===
- 2 Nice Girls (1989), Rough Trade
- Like a Version (1990), Rough Trade
- Chloe Liked Olivia (1991), Rough Trade

=== Singles ===
- "Sweet Jane (With Affection)" (1989), Rough Trade
