= Bill Daniel (filmmaker) =

American experimental documentary filmmaker, installation artist and curator

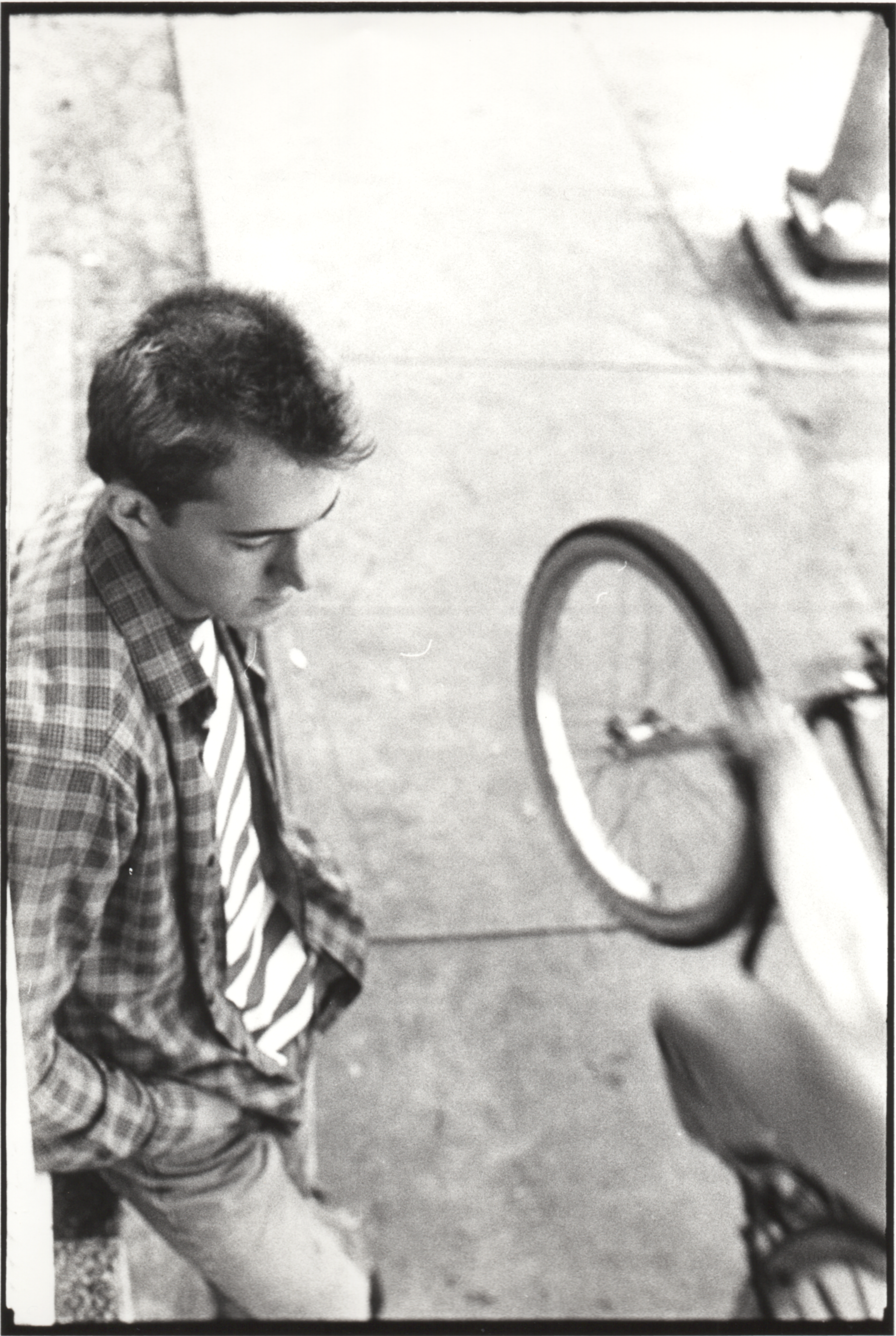
- Daniel pictured in Austin, Texas, 1982
- Born: 1959 (age 66–67); Houston, Texas
- Education: University of Texas at Austin
- Occupation: Cinematographer
- Notable work: Who is Bozo Texino?
- Relatives: Lee Daniel

Bill Daniel (born 1959) is an American experimental documentary film artist, photographer, film editor, and cinematographer. He is also an installation artist, curator, and former zine publisher. His full-length film, Who is Bozo Texino? about the tradition of hobo and railworker boxcar graffiti was completed in 2005 and has screened extensively throughout the United States and Europe. Daniel has collaborated with several artists from the Bay Area Mission School art movement, notably Margaret Kilgallen and has worked on multiple projects with underground director Craig Baldwin. Film/video artist Rankin Renwick of the Oregon Department of Kick Ass has been a frequent touring partner, collaborator and co-curator.

In 2008, he was awarded a Guggenheim Fellowship for film.

== Background ==
Daniel was born in Houston; he has lived and worked in Austin, New York, San Francisco, Pittsburgh, Portland and Shreveport. He attended college at the University of Texas at Austin where he majored in marketing. His brother Lee Daniel is also a cinematographer.

== Selected films and installations ==
A wide variety of locations have served as venues for Bill Daniel's film and installation works, from urban rooftops and abandoned drive-in movie theaters to Jonas Mekas' Anthology Film Archives and the Independent Film Channel. A quite select listing of the numerous locations Daniel has screened his films at (in person) includes Center for Documentary Studies in Durham NC, Houston's Aurora Picture Show, Mini-Cine in Shreveport, the Los Angeles Film Forum, the Luggage Store Gallery in San Francisco, Space 1026 in Philadelphia, Deitch Projects in NYC, and the New Image Art Gallery in Los Angeles.

=== Who is Bozo Texino? (2005) ===
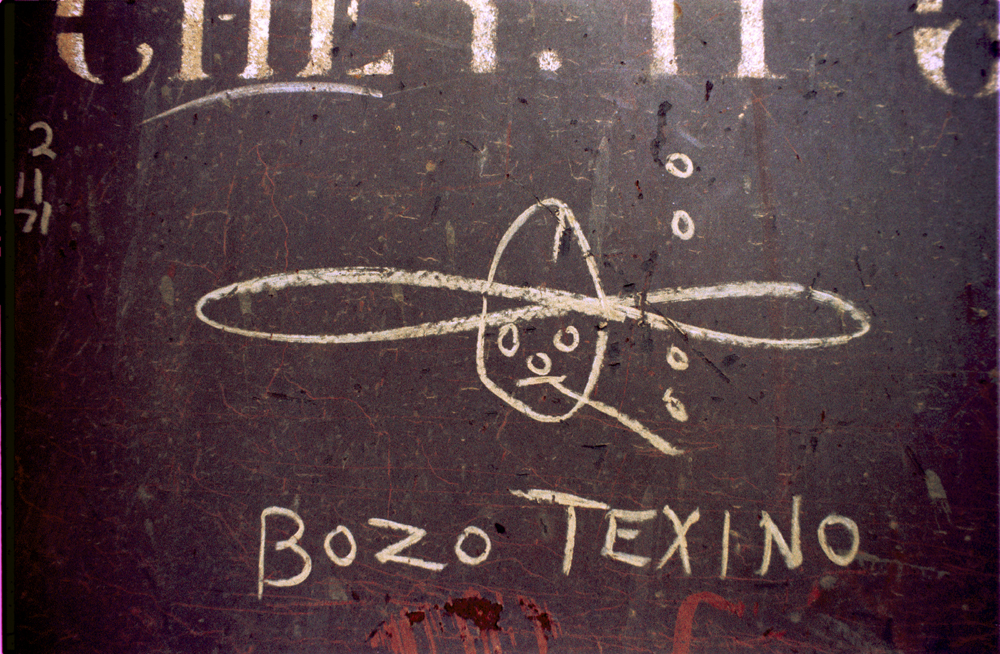
Bozo Texino at the Cosmic Cowboy Concert

This 55 min. experimental documentary film was shot primarily in black and white 8mm and 16mm film and was subsequently digitally edited. With a goal of tracing the true identity behind Bozo Texino, whose iconic hand-drawn cowboy moniker has appeared on the sides of trains for nearly a century, Bill Daniel hopped boxcars with drifters and camped in hobo jungles, all the while collecting stories and images of a little-known American folk art tradition.

=== Soul's Harbor (2003) ===
Installed at San Francisco's Yerba Buena Center for the Arts, this mixed-media installation featured an RV partially converted into a houseboat with projected video images on one side. Documentary footage of the search for Noah's Ark combined with characters like a homeless preacher, a punk-pirate and other "water-squatters" explored themes of modern environmental collapse & survivalism.

=== Seadrift Texas 1990 (2002) ===
Video installation using interview footage of working-class residents of the gulf coast fishing town Seadrift who are combating industrial pollution from a neighboring plastic plant. The video segments were shown framed by pictures and windows on a mock living room wall at Tacoma's Tollbooth Gallery.

=== The Girl on the Train in the Moon (2001) ===
Hobo campfire installation with film projections at Deitch Projects gallery in New York for "Widely Unknown" group show. Also shown on the nationwide "Lucky Bum Film Tour" with Rankin Renwick (then known as Vanessa Renwick), this installation included footage from what would become the full-length film Who is Bozo Texino?.

=== Selective Service System Story (1998) ===
Created for the Independent Film Channel's Split Screen series, this documentary revisits the 1970 short film Selective Service System and interviews Dan Lovejoy and Warren Haack, who made the graphic depiction of an individual's attempt to avoid the Vietnam War draft as film students at San Francisco State University.

== Awards and recognition ==
Daniel has received numerous awards including grants from the Film Arts Foundation, Creative Capital, the R&B Feber Charitable Foundation for the Beaux Arts and residencies at the Yerba Buena Center for the Arts, the Headlands Center for the Arts, and the Center for Land Use Interpretation. He received a Guggenheim Fellowship in 2008. His films have been featured at numerous film festivals including the prestigious Viennale or Vienna International Film Festival, The Portland Art Museum's Northwest Film and Video Festival (where his Selective Service System Story was awarded best documentary film), and the True/False Festival where he has been a panelist. In 2006, Daniel was a judge for the Iowa City International Documentary Film Festival.
