= Jared Pappas-Kelley =

American curator

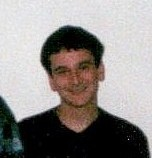
Jared Pappas-Kelley in 2000.

Jared Pappas-Kelley is an American curator, researcher, and visual artist. He studied at The Evergreen State College, Goddard College and the European Graduate School where he served as Graduate Teaching Assistant for both Jean-Luc Nancy and Paul D. Miller (DJ Spooky) while completing his PhD. Pappas-Kelley also studied with filmmakers Claire Denis and Barbara Hammer whom he cites as influences on his visual work. His doctoral thesis, supervised by Sylvère Lotringer, examines the inherent instability of art objects, investigating what he terms "the thing that is not a thing" through an examination of events such as the 2004 Momart warehouse fire and the objects stolen and subsequently lost or destroyed by art thief Stéphane Breitwieser. Much of his current research focuses on ideas of this instability of the art object and the intersection between practice and theory, examining art as a method for understanding the object’s coming together through its undoing. Developing these themes, he is currently organizing a group exhibition that he is co-curating with Natasha Chuk entitled Solvent Forms.

In addition, Pappas-Kelley’s visual work, film, and installations have exhibited internationally in museums, festivals, and galleries, most recently at London gallery Five Years curated by Dennis Cooper. From 2001 until 2007, Pappas-Kelley was publisher and a founding editor of the contemporary art journal Toby Room. His articles and writings on art appear in journals, newspapers, and anthologies, including publications such as The Rumpus, and he is a peer reviewer and serves as article editor in academic journals. His direction of the arts organization ArtRod led to the creation of the Tollbooth Gallery and Critical Line art center alongside other media projects.

Since 1999 Pappas-Kelley has toured and curated an ongoing series of expanded and experimental video/film series called Don’t Bite the Pavement.
