= Johanna Fateman =

American songwriter (born 1974)

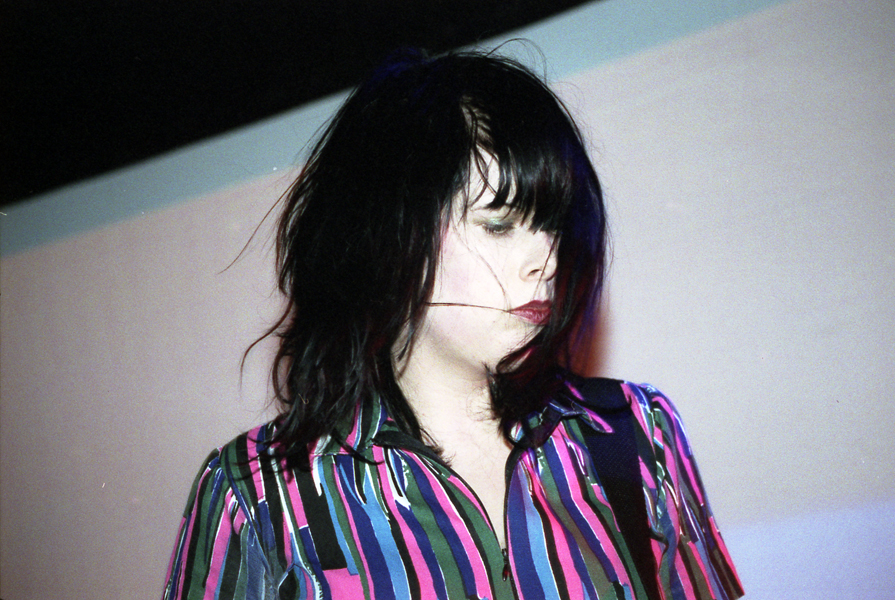
- Fateman performing with Le Tigre in August 2008

Background information
- Also known as: Jo
- Born: May 16, 1974 (age 52)
- Genre: Indie
- Occupations: Writer, songwriter, musician, record producer
- Years active: 1998–present

Johanna Rachel Fateman (born May 16, 1974) is an American writer, songwriter, musician, and record producer. She is a member of the electropunk band Le Tigre and founded the band MEN with Le Tigre bandmate JD Samson.

== Early life and education ==
Fateman grew up in Berkeley, California, where her father, computer scientist Richard Fateman, is a professor at UC Berkeley. On the official Le Tigre website, Fateman refers to filmmaker Miranda July as being her "best friend from high school"; July is also from Berkeley. They went to The College Preparatory School. At the age of seventeen, Fateman moved to Portland, Oregon, to attend Reed College, which she later left for art school in New York City.

== Writing ==
Fateman began her writing career producing zines including My Need To Speak on the Subject of Jackson Pollock; ArtaudMania!!! The Diary of a Fan; The Opposite, Part I; and SNARLA, which she co-wrote with Miranda July. It was through her zines that Fateman first met bandmate Kathleen Hanna. At a performance of Hanna's band Bikini Kill, Fateman gave Hanna a copy of one of her zines. As Hanna has related in interviews, she was impressed and inspired by Fateman's writing, and the two kept in touch.

She donated her early zines and correspondence to New York University, where they are kept in the Riot Grrrl Collection at the Fales Library.

Beginning in 2016, Fateman became a columnist for The New Yorker, regularly contributing to the magazine's "Goings On About Town" section. Fateman has also written critically about art and pop culture for Bookforum, Artforum, and 4Columns.

== Music career ==
When Bikini Kill was on hiatus, Kathleen Hanna moved to Portland, where she and Fateman lived with several other women in an off-campus Reed College house known as "The Curse." Radio Sloan, who also lived at The Curse, taught Fateman how to play her first songs on a $60 bass guitar. Around this time, Hanna and Fateman formed their first band together, the Troublemakers, named after the film of the same name by G.B. Jones. The band played at house parties in Portland but broke up when Fateman moved to New York.

=== Le Tigre ===
Hanna soon followed her to the East Coast, and the two women joined forces with filmmaker Sadie Benning to form Le Tigre. After their first album, Benning left the band to return to filmmaking. JD Samson joined the line-up for Feminist Sweepstakes, their next release. The band's most recent album is This Island and in January 2007, they went on hiatus.

In June 2011, a documentary film about Le Tigre's final year of touring was released by Oscilloscope Laboratories. Who Took the Bomp? Le Tigre on Tour, directed by Kerthy Fix, documents the band's live show and features interview footage of the band members reflecting on their experiences.

=== Swim with the Dolphins ===
While working with Le Tigre, Fateman started her own solo project called "Swim with the Dolphins", named after a self-help book by the same title with the subtitle "How Women Can Succeed in Corporate America on Their Own Terms". She made a five-song cassette entitled "the struggle for the full exercise of woman's equality" during the winter of 1999, which she describes as "sample-based, dj/dance-floor inspired music for the feminist rave in my head".

=== MEN ===
After Le Tigre went on indefinite hiatus, Fateman and Samson worked together as DJs. They took on the name MEN, eventually adding members and turning into a full musical troupe. Although Fateman left early after becoming pregnant, MEN carried on, making electro-influenced dance music with a political slant.

=== Collaborations ===
Fateman has continued to remix, write and produce music for other artists, often with JD Samson. Fateman, Hanna, and Samson wrote and produced the Christina Aguilera song "My Girls" featuring Peaches for Aguilera's album Bionic. Fateman wrote about the experience on the Le Tigre blog: "Together we tailored themes and specific references to her personality and image but found a ton of common ground in our aim to make upbeat danceable tracks celebrating female friendship, strength, and of course, PARTYING. And while the giant sound of her stacked vocals and the pop sheen she lends to the tracks might seem at odds with Le Tigre's aesthetic roots, it really works. The songs have a lot of elements we're known for, like a garage guitar sound, schoolyard chants, new wave-y synths, electro beats, and somehow it all sounds crazily right with Christina's unbelievable voice."

Fateman was the sound designer for experimental filmmaker Cecilia Dougherty's Gone. She also served as the music director and composer for artist Laura Parnes' 2011 episodic video work County Down. Fateman and Samson are credited as co-writers on the 2011 Cobra Starship song "Shwick".

== Seagull salon ==
Since 2006, Fateman has been part-owner of a West Village hair salon called Seagull. Established in the 1970s and named after the novel Jonathan Livingston Seagull, the salon was the city's first unisex barber shop. Fateman runs the business side while her partner, Shaun Surething, handles the styling crew. Surething (a regular collaborator with performance artist K8 Hardy) and Fateman were featured in a short documentary on Current TV.
