= Fleisher-Ollman Gallery =

Coordinates: 39.953979°N 75.160294°W

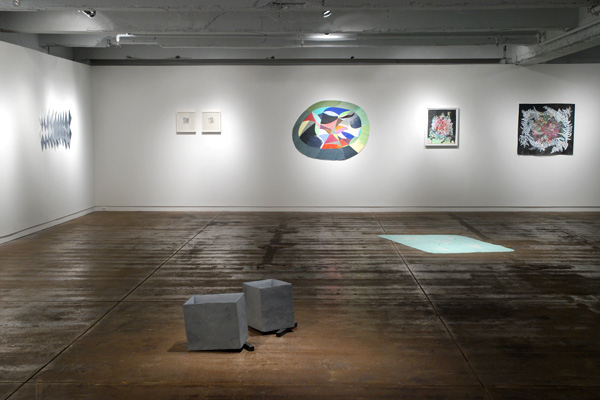
Fleisher/Ollman Gallery in 2008.

Fleisher/Ollman Gallery is a U.S. art gallery in Philadelphia, Pennsylvania. It opened in 1952 as the Janet Fleisher Gallery and remained as such for over thirty years. The gallery established a reputation as one of the world’s premiere sources for self-taught art, defining the field and helping to develop major public and private collections of this once-marginalized group of artists. Fleisher/Ollman was among the first to mount major exhibitions of work by Henry Darger, Sister Gertrude Morgan, Bill Traylor, and Martin Ramirez, and we published early catalogues on James Castle, William Edmondson, and Joseph Yoakum. Since 1997, the gallery's emphasis has shifted toward the exhibition of contemporary artists who reflect the influence of the intuitive practice, such as Anthony Campuzano and Tristin Lowe.
