= Feminist Sweepstakes =

2001 Le Tigre album

Studio album by Le Tigre
- Released: October 16, 2001
- Studios: Modern Recording, Chapel Hill, North Carolina
- Genres: Art punk, electronic rock, riot grrrl
- Length: 40:58
- Label: Mr. Lady
- Producers: Chris Stamey, Le Tigre

Le Tigre chronology
From the Desk of Mr. Lady (2001)	Feminist Sweepstakes (2001)	Remix (2003)

Le Tigre studio album chronology
Le Tigre (1999)	Feminist Sweepstakes (2001)	This Island (2004)

Feminist Sweepstakes is the second studio album by American electro-punk band Le Tigre. It was released on October 16, 2001, by record label Mr. Lady.

Feminist Sweepstakes is Le Tigre's first album to feature JD Samson as a member of the band. She had previously worked with the band as a roadie and the operator of former member Sadie Benning's slide show during live performances in support of their first record.

== Background ==
The album title "Feminist Sweepstakes" was explained by JD Samson:

"The idea came to us when pondering the idea of what a feminist Easter basket may look like. We began planning a basket of goodies that would be a prize that could be won by an unsuspecting record buyer. Soon enough, after bouncing the word sweepstakes around, we looked up 'sweepstakes' in the dictionary and there was instant gratification. A sweepstakes is a contest in which the members of the contest put together their own (be it money or objects, etc.) in order to come out with a large winning of some sort for the prize winner. For us, the feminist sweepstakes is the life we live as feminists (for one) every feminist gives her/his own to the rest of the community, and each person then is able to have the collective power of feminism itself. And number two, each song then becomes a prize for each willing/winning listener."

== Songs ==
=== F.Y.R. ===
"F.Y.R.", which stands for "Fifty Years of Ridicule", is one of the album's faster songs. The song name is a reference to the book The Dialectic of Sex by Shulamith Firestone, which describes the fifty years of ridicule American women had to deal with between obtaining the ability to vote in 1920 to the book's publication in 1970. It also includes references to mifepristone/RU-486, Title IX, the shower scene in which Janet Leigh is killed in Alfred Hitchcock's Psycho, Mrs. Doubtfire and Virginia Slims cigarettes, who used the slogan "You've Come a Long Way, Baby" and themes of independence and liberation to advertise towards women during the 1960s and 1970s.

The song's outro (or, as listed in the liner notes, the intro to the song, On Guard) is a live performance of an excerpt from the stand-up monologue, The Saturday Night Special: Rape and Other Big Jokes, written by Naomi Weisstein.

=== Dyke March 2001 ===
Dyke March 2001 consists mainly of recorded samples from the Dyke March in New York City, which the band members attended. Samson said the song was written in mind of making it a dance hit for lesbian bars; "Lesbian bars shouldn't have to play Madonna and Young M.C. We really wanted to create a song that was made for and by queer women all over. We wanted women marching and exploding with lesbian pride to fuel the song as lyrics and percussive instruments."

=== Keep On Livin' ===
"Keep On Livin'" is a song about "both forms of coming out", as an abuse survivor and/or as an LGBT person, and moving on from the hardships of it. It was written collaboratively by Hanna and Samson, who both felt their respective experiences of sexual abuse and coming out drew emotional parallels. It was also inspired by Ann Cvetkovic's essay, "Sexual Trauma / Queer Memory", which discusses the intersections between "Incest, Lesbianism and Therapeutic Culture", and led to the decision to mention both subjects in the same song.

Le Tigre has a dedicated page on their website, also called "Keep On Livin' ", which contains advice from JD Samson for coming out, as well as help from Kathleen Hanna for sexual abuse survivors. The page also contains a music video for the song, which was and produced and directed by Paper Tiger Television in collaboration with Samson, and features several LGBTQ+ youths from New York.

== Release ==
Feminist Sweepstakes was released on October 16, 2001.

Another version of the album was released on August 24, 2004, with a bonus multimedia track, a different version of "Well, Well, Well" featuring Vaginal Davis.

== Reception ==
Professional ratings
Aggregate scores
Source	Rating
Metacritic	78/100
Review scores
Source	Rating
AllMusic	3/5 stars
The A.V. Club	mixed
Robert Christgau	A−
Entertainment Weekly	A−
Mojo	4.5/5 stars
Pitchfork	6.6/10
Q	3/5 stars
Rolling Stone	3/5 stars
Spin	4/5 stars
Uncut	4/5 stars

Feminist Sweepstakes has been generally well received by critics, and holds an approval rating of 78 out of 100 on Metacritic based on reviews from 16 critics.

Mojo reviewer called it "Protest music that doesn't protest too much – a music with such a joy and wit to its outrage that it acquires a universality beyond its subject matter." Uncut called it "The catchiest lesson in sexual politics you're likely to hear this season". Alternative Press wrote "This is still some of the most original, passionate and listenable music of the year".

Slightly less favorable was Allison Fields of Pitchfork, who wrote "Feminist Sweepstakes wants to be a terrifically fun album, yet with no deviation from the ceaseless politics and endless drum machine beats, things go stale." Andy Battaglia of The A.V. Club wrote "Hanna is a crafty writer who can give song lyrics the weight of a master's thesis, but she often sounds tired and resigned this time out" and that the album "suggests a band less inspired by its own purpose."

== In popular culture ==
"Keep on Livin'" is used in the 2019 series finale of Jessica Jones.

== Track listing ==
All tracks are written by Le Tigre, except where noted.

No.	Title	Writer(s)	Length
1.	"LT Tour Theme"		2:47
2.	"Shred A"		2:46
3.	"Fake French"		2:53
4.	"FYR"		3:15
5.	"On Guard"		3:30
6.	"Much Finer"		2:33
7.	"Dyke March 2001"		4:37
8.	"Tres Bien"	Le Tigre, Tammy Rae Carland	3:08
9.	"Well, Well, Well"		4:19
10.	"TGIF"		3:18
11.	"My Art"		2:01
12.	"Cry for Everything Bad That's Ever Happened"		2:41
13.	"Keep On Livin"		3:10
Total length:			40:58

== Charts ==
Chart (2001)	Peak position
US Billboard Top Independent Albums	43
