= Le Tigre (album) =

Studio album by Le Tigre
- Released: October 25, 1999
- Genres: Dance-punk, new wave, riot grrrl
- Length: 31:44
- Label: Mr. Lady
- Producers: Chris Stamey, Le Tigre

Le Tigre chronology
Le Tigre (1999)	From the Desk of Mr. Lady (2001)

Le Tigre studio album chronology
Le Tigre (1999)	Feminist Sweepstakes (2001)

Singles from Le Tigre
- 1. "Hot Topic" Released: 1999

Le Tigre is the debut studio album by American music trio Le Tigre. It was released October 25, 1999, on Mr. Lady Records. The album combined pop music with the band's feminist political lyrics. It received positive reviews from music critics.

== History ==
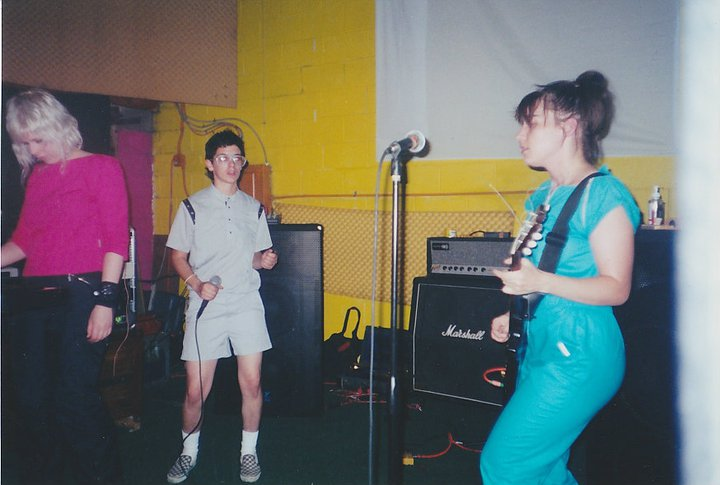
Fateman, Samson, and Hanna performing in September 2000

Le Tigre was formed by Kathleen Hanna, Johanna Fateman, and Sadie Benning. Hanna lived with Fateman while the two were in a band called the Troublemakers. Hanna had collaborated with Benning on a video for "Aerobicide" from Hanna's 1997 album Julie Ruin. The three of them originally planned to come up with a live format for Hanna's songs as Julie Ruin, but they transitioned into making music.

The band constructed songs using inexpensive electronic equipment. Fateman explained that they chose equipment with which they were unfamiliar to show "girl-punk scorn for that particular strain of male expertise associated with electronic music." Le Tigre produced the album with Chris Stamey of the dB's, who helped the band rearrange songs through digital editing. Hanna and Fateman knew the founders of Mr. Lady Records from their time in Portland, Oregon. They chose to release the album through Mr. Lady because of its political engagement. When Benning was unable to tour in support of the album, the band removed them from its lineup and added JD Samson.

== Composition ==
Le Tigre's music spans 1960s pop, punk rock, and lo-fi new wave. The band members listened to pop and hip-hop music while making it. Le Tigre plays Farfisa organs, samplers, turntables, and guitars on the album. Many of the album's beats were programmed on an Alesis HR-16 drum machine; Fateman stated that she found the use of a drum machine liberating because "it makes you self-sufficient." Various parts were sampled and played on an Ensoniq Mirage.

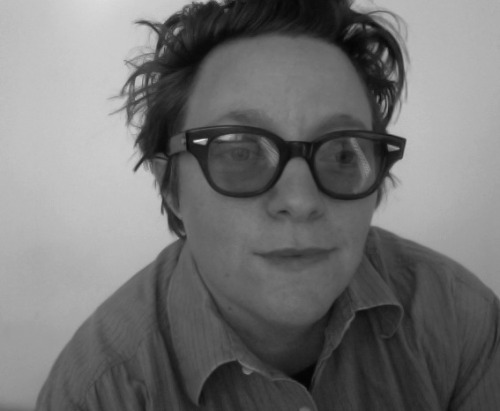
Sadie Benning, one of the original band members and collaborators.

The album incorporates the band's political beliefs; Hanna commented that she wanted "to make something that's totally pleasurable and political too." "My My Metrocard" criticizes New York City mayor Rudy Giuliani, and "Hot Topic" praises progressive activists. The band emphasized frankness and didacticism in its lyrics as a response to the ironic tone of hipster subculture. Le Tigre's vocals often carry a bored or soft-spoken tone, punctuated by more energetic bursts. Their use of girl group chants was likened to 1960s group the Shangri-Las. Hanna was influenced by the vocals on old records by Lesley Gore, the Shirelles, and Connie Francis. She explained that she was fascinated by "what it would be like to be a woman with way more constraints than we have now, singing these really fucked-up insipid heterosexual love songs."

== Songs ==
"Deceptacon"
The song's lyrics allude to "Who Put the Bomp (in the Bomp, Bomp, Bomp)" by Barry Mann.

=== Deceptacon ===
Opening track "Deceptacon" references Barry Mann's 1961 single "Who Put the Bomp (in the Bomp, Bomp, Bomp)" by asking "Who took the Bomp from the Bompalompalomp?". It denounces a decline in meaningful lyrics in rock music. Hanna expressed frustration that riot grrrl had been transformed into icons like the Spice Girls. The song was popularized by online videos of its "aerobicon" choreography. The song critiques the lyrics to the song "Linoleum" by NOFX as a response to the song "Kill Rockstars" from So Long And Thanks For All The Shoes which heavily critiques their record label Kill Rock Stars."Deceptacon" was featured in the 2006 Norwegian film Reprise, the 2003 skateboarding film Yeah Right!, the 2015 documentary film Hurricane of Fun: The Making of Wet Hot, the 2014 animated film The Book of Life, a Pandora Radio advertisement featuring British virtual band Gorillaz, the fourth episode of the Netflix series Special, the trailer for the 2019 film Between Two Ferns: The Movie, The 2022 film Do Revenge, and the 2023 television special Invincible: Atom Eve. The song sparked a collaboration between Le Tigre and Christina Aguilera.

=== Hot Topic ===
"Hot Topic" was released as the album's only single. It is a list song of people whose work inspired the band. Most are female, and many are also LGBT. The song encourages them to continue on behalf of progressive women. It combines the sounds of doo-wop, Japanese indie pop, and new wave. Hanna described "Hot Topic" as analogous to a college syllabus in its ability to pass on awareness of works to others. The song was used in a Kohl's commercial in 2016.

=== What's Yr Take on Cassavetes ===
"What's Yr Take on Cassavetes" uses American filmmaker John Cassavetes to depict the conflict between public figures' work and their personal lives. It opens with a solemn spoken passage asking "how you really feel about it". The song breaks down into a shouting match that labels Cassavetes with positive terms such as "genius" and "messiah" as well as negative ones such as "misogynist" and "alcoholic".

=== My My Metrocard ===
"My My Metrocard" is a song about escapism and exploration. It uses a call-and-response pattern to condemn then-New York mayor Rudy Giuliani, whose policies against quality-of-life crimes the band opposed.

== Critical reception ==
Professional ratings
Review scores
Source	Rating
AllMusic	4/5 stars
Alternative Press	4/5
Christgau's Consumer Guide	A
Entertainment Weekly	A−
Melody Maker	4.5/5 stars
Pitchfork	8.5/10
Rolling Stone	3.5/5 stars
The Rolling Stone Album Guide	4/5 stars
Select	4/5
Spin	9/10

Le Tigre received positive reviews from music critics. The Village Voice writer Robert Christgau wrote that "Hanna does the unprecedented—if not, apparently, impossible—and reinvents punk again." AllMusic described Le Tigre as sounding "like the best new wave album not to come from the 1980s." Pitchfork called the album's songwriting "less didactic than Bikini Kill's ... geared for the repeated listens these well-crafted pop songs beg for." Spin said that the album "sparkles with a joie de vivre more bubbly than a pink champagne" and continued that "the sound is as charming as the stories they tell", and the magazine later named it the 10th best album of 2000. PopMatters described Le Tigre as "a record in which bristling punk-pop tunes target listeners with confrontational, thought-provoking messages." Select referred to the album as "12 sparky pop nuggets" and "a righteous gem and one worthy of attention of even the most demanding devotee of big shiny production."

Le Tigre placed 28th on The Village Voice's 2000 Pazz & Jop critics' poll. The album is listed on Spin's list of "The 300 Best Albums Of The Past 30 Years (1985-2014)", and in the reference book 1001 Albums You Must Hear Before You Die. In 2022, Le Tigre placed 43rd on Pitchfork's list of "The 150 Best Albums of the 1990s".

In 2026 Rolling Stone placed it at 65 on their list of The 100 Greatest Punk Albums of All Time.

== Track listing ==
All tracks are written by Le Tigre.

No.	Title	Length
1.	"Deceptacon"	3:04
2.	"Hot Topic"	3:44
3.	"What's Yr Take on Cassavetes"	2:22
4.	"The The Empty"	2:04
5.	"Phanta"	3:14
6.	"Eau d'Bedroom Dancing"	2:55
7.	"Let's Run"	2:34
8.	"My My Metrocard"	3:07
9.	"Friendship Station"	3:04
10.	"Slideshow at Free University"	2:48
11.	"Dude, Yr So Crazy!"	3:26
12.	"Les and Ray"	2:06
Total length:		34:28

Bonus tracks on 2004 reissue
No.	Title	Length
13.	"Hot Topic" (BBC Evening Session)	3:07
14.	"Deceptacon" (BBC Evening Session)	3:09
15.	"The The Empty" (BBC Evening Session)	2:02
16.	"Sweetie" (BBC Evening Session)	2:43

Bonus tracks on Japanese edition
No.	Title	Length
13.	"Hot Topic" (41 Small Stars remix)
14.	"They Want Us to Make a Symphony Out of the Sound of Women Swallowing Their Own Tongues"
15.	"Yr Critique"

=== Track list error on reissue ===
The first two bonus tracks listed on the back cover of the reissue have "Hot Topic" then "Deceptacon". These songs are listed in the wrong order, as the song "Deceptacon" is on track 13, and "Hot Topic" is on track 14. This information is matched by the CDDB, but was fixed in the iTunes Store.

== Personnel ==
- Kathleen Hanna – lead vocals (all but 3, 10 & 11), backing vocals (3), guitar (3), bass guitar (8), drum machine, sampler
- Johanna Fateman – lead vocals (3), backing vocals (1, 2, 3, 4 & 8), guitar (4 & 7), keyboards (1 & 8)
- Sadie Benning – backing vocals (1, 2, 3, & 8), guitar (2)
- JD Samson – lead vocals (11), backing vocals (2) trumpet (7)
