= Wynne Greenwood =

American film director

- Born: 1977 (age 48–49)
- Education: BFA Rutgers University; MFA Bard College

Wynne Greenwood (born 1977) is a queer and lesbian feminist performance artist who works in various media such as installation art, photography, filmmaking and music. One of her well known projects include the electropop and video project group, Tracy + the Plastics. Wynne works out of Seattle, Washington, and was an instructor in the Department of Art and Art History at Seattle University.

== Education ==
She attended Douglass College, and Rutgers University for her undergraduate studies and later received an M.F.A, from the Milton Avery Graduate School for the Arts, Bard College in 2004.

== Music career ==
Greenwood is perhaps best known for her work under the name Tracy + the Plastics. While working as the Plastics, she played the role of three characters: Tracy and her back-up singers, Nikki Romanos and Cola. In live performances, Nikki and Cola (aka "the Plastics") existed in pre-recorded video which played behind "Tracy" (Greenwood, in person) as she gave live vocals. The project ended in June 2006. In 2012, Greenwood released a full-length music album titled A Fire to Keep You Warm.

== Fine arts career ==
Since 2006, Greenwood has shifted her practice to focus mostly on visual art. While Tracy + The Plastics performed extensively in gallery and museum settings, in late 2004 Greenwood had an exhibit of her own work Maps to Radical Imagining at the Tollbooth Gallery in Tacoma, Washington.

In 2005, Greenwood and fellow artist K8 Hardy collaborated on the New Report, a video piece in which the two played reporters on a fictional feminist news station. The film combines activism and campy satire, critiquing the absurdity of televised news. It was part of the Tate Modern Level 2: Media Burn exhibition.

Greenwood is represented by Susanne Vielmetter, which has organized several one-person exhibitions of her work. Her installation entitled "Peas" was featured as a Susanne Vielmetter Berlin Project from February to April 2007. The gallery organized exhibitions of her work in 2008 (Face It) and 2011 ("How We Pray").

In 2015 the New Museum in New York City organized the solo exhibition Kelly, in which Greenwood created a character "orbiting beyond the Plastics' cosmology" during which Greenwood re-performed and archived her Tracy + the Plastics-era work, as well as created new pieces as part of an exhibition-related residency at the museum.

Other locations that Greenwood's work has been shown are The Moore Space, Miami; Participant, New York; Susanne Vielmetter Los Angeles Projects, Los Angeles; The Hayward, London, UK; the Frye Art Museum, Seattle, WA; Reena Spaulings Fine Arts, New York; Foxy Productions, New York; The Kitchen, New York; and the Moscow Biennale. Group exhibitions and performances include New Report, The F Word, Andy Warhol Museum, Pittsburgh, PA; Tracy + the Plastics, TBA Festival, Portland Institute of Contemporary Art, Portland, OR; Tracy + the Plastics, Walker Art Center, Minneapolis, MN; What is Human?, Transmodern Age Festival of Experimental Performance, Baltimore, MD; Tracy + the Plastics, Whitney Biennial, New York; and Hot Topic and On the Verge, videos for Le Tigre live performance, world tour 2004–2005.

== Awards ==
In 2008, Greenwood received a Genius Award from Seattle's The Stranger (newspaper), which included a check for $5,000 and a notification via cake. The cake was received while Greenwood was teaching art to kids convicted of crimes at Southeast Youth and Family Services in Columbia City. She responded to the honor by saying, "You have no idea what this means. . . . Now I can make art again." In 2013 Greenwood received the 22nd Bonnie Bronson Fellowship.
