= Laura Parnes =

American film director

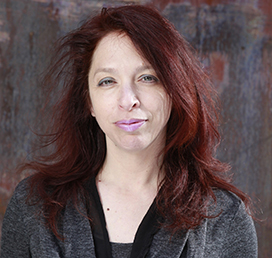
- Born: Buffalo, NY
- Education: BFA, Tyler School of Art, Temple University, Philadelphia, PA
- Awards: Solomon Guggenheim Memorial Fellow, 2013; Anonymous Was A Woman grantee, 2026

Laura Parnes is an American contemporary artist. Her work is often episodic, references pop culture, female stereotypes, history and the anxiety of influence. She was the co-director of Momenta Art with Eric Heist and helped relaunch the not-for-profit exhibition space in New York City; at first as a nomadic space and then as a permanent space in Williamsburg, Brooklyn. She continued to her involvement as a Board Chair until 2011. Parnes received her BFA from the Tyler School of Art, Temple University, and lives and works in Brooklyn, NY. She currently teaches in MFA departments at MICA, Parsons, and SVA.

== Works and critical reception ==
Laura Parnes' latest work, County Down, is an episodic, digital film investigating a pandemic of psychosis in a gated community that coincides with an adolescent girl's creation of a designer drug. Performers include Chloe Bass, Becca Blackwell, Ellen Cantor, Patty Chang, Nicole Eisenman, Jim Fletcher, Kate Valk, Stephanie Vella and Sacha Yanow. The soundtrack and musical arrangements are by Johanna Fateman.

Blood and Guts in High School, a 50-minute Parnes video which Chris Kraus called an “extrapolationist reduction” of Kathy Acker’s famous 1978 novel of the same name, builds snippets of the book's original dialogue and text into scripts for theatrical vignettes. Holland Cotter stated “the video is a model of how to bring off an ambitions project with scant resources, and also of how to respect source material while transforming it. Ms. Parnes’s video floats like a shark, forever hovering, but always watching and moving.”

Often her work is formally staged and uses dialogue sampled from cultural dogma. Her work Hollywood Inferno is a two-channel installation that refers to our cultural obsession with adolescents. The main protagonist, Sandy, is a candy store clerk who attaches herself to a script writer named Virgil, who promises career contacts and gives her a picaresque tour through cultural hell.

She collaborated with Sue de Beer on Heidi 2, an unauthorized sequel to Mike Kelley and Paul McCarthy’s Heidi. In this feminist, multi-media installation the artists used pop cultural tropes without apology expressing the most primal events through the idiom of sitcoms, video games and splatter films.

== Exhibitions ==
Laura Parnes' works have been exhibited widely in the United States and worldwide, including: Deste Foundation for Contemporary Art, Athens, Greece., LOOP Festival, Barcelona, Spain; Light Industry, Brooklyn, NY; Kusthalle Winterhur, Switzerland; Overgaden- Institute for Contemporary Art, Copenhagen, Denmark; iMOCA, Indianapolis, IN; Cinematexas, Austin, TX; Contemporary Art Center, Vilnius, Lithuania; Museo Nacional Centro De Arte Reina Sofia, Madrid; Whitney Museum of American Art (1997 Whitney Biennial), NY; Dunedin Public Art Gallery, New Zealand; PSI Contemporary Art Center MoMA, NY; Miami Museum of Contemporary Art, FL; and Brooklyn Museum, NY.

Her solo exhibitions include: LA><Art, LA, CA; Alma Enterprises, London; Locust Projects, Miami; Upstream Gallery, Amsterdam; Los Angeles Contemporary Exhibitions, LA; Participant Inc, NY and Deitch Projects, NY. She has had solo screenings at MoMA, NY; CATE 10-year Anniversary, presented by the School of Art Institute of Chicago and Video Data Bank, Gene Siskel Film Center, Chicago IL; Pacific Film Archive, Berkeley Art Museum, CA; Vtape, Toronto and in a two-person screening at MoMA, NY. She was presented by Participant Inc. in a two-person exhibition at No Soul for Sale at X Initiative, NYC, NY.

She participated in the 1997 Whitney Biennial, is a 2013 Solomon R. Guggenheim Memorial Fellow and Creative Capital Awardee, and a 2026 Anonymous Was A Woman grantee.
