= This Island (Le Tigre album) =

Studio album by Le Tigre
- Released: October 19, 2004
- Recorded: 2002–2004
- Genres: Dance-rock; new wave
- Length: 43:21
- Labels: Strummer; Universal
- Producers: Le Tigre; Nick Sansano; Ric Ocasek

Le Tigre chronology
Remix (2003)	This Island (2004)	Morning Becomes Eclectic (KCRW Live) (2005)

Le Tigre studio album chronology
Feminist Sweepstakes (2001)	This Island (2004)

Singles from This Island
- 1. "New Kicks" Released: 2004; 2. "TKO" Released: 2004; 3. "After Dark" Released: March 21, 2005

This Island is the third and most recent album by American dance-punk band Le Tigre. It was released by Universal Records on October 19, 2004. The album was the band's only one for a major label and reached number 130 on the Billboard 200. As of 2008, the album had sold 90,000 copies.

== Recording and production ==
Following the conclusion of the Feminist Sweepstakes touring cycle in 2002, the band envisioned a different approach to their recording. They decided to remove studio deadlines, and instead of going to North Carolina to record material (because New York recording studios were too expensive), the band used their touring money to set up their own individual home studios with Pro Tools in Manhattan, New York, and were switching around hard drives of music while working on the record. "It’s done so much", JD Samson commented on the new recording approach. "One thing is that it lends it self so well to the bands music and it's a non-linear process where we can just patch stuff up and also having the time. But plus it made us stuck for years on the record because we were so picky."

As there were no deadlines for studio times or pressures from their label at the time, Mr. Lady, the band had the ability to polish their sound beyond the DIY sound of their previous records. “It’s slightly more produced", Kathleen Hanna commented on the record's sound. "Just because we spent a lot more time on each individual song and made sure we had all the frequencies covered." The band chose Nick Sansano as the album's producer, due to his work mixing Rob Base & DJ E-Z Rock's "It Takes Two"; "It pretty much sealed the deal for us", Johanna Fateman commented.

== Composition and songs ==
This Island has been described as poppier than previous Le Tigre records, and was something the band had been developing since their last album Feminist Sweepstakes. "The writing was emerging as poppier and accessible", Hanna said in an interview to The Guardian. "I remember saying to the others, 'All the songs I'm writing are pop songs. What are you writing? Because if we're going on a major label, let this be the record.'"

"Seconds" is a fast punk song about then-president George W. Bush. Hanna, a strong opponent of Bush, commented: "You know that feeling when you see him on TV and you feel like you're going to throw up?" I feel like I can't look at him anymore because I get so physically freaked out and upset. I don't wanna be one of those "tune out, turn off" people, but I don't even know if I can mentally take watching him lie anymore. It makes me so angry and upset." "Tell You Now" is the only song on the album produced by Ric Ocasek of the Cars, and the track also samples Cookie Man by the Jazz Crusaders. Ocasek had an active involvement in crafting the song and also helped the band shape their sound by giving the band a few "pop tricks". Fateman later commented on working with Ocasek: "That was an interesting experience working with him, but we never worked with anyone that early in the process who listened to our demo of the song and had structuring ideas and had someone who’s really a master of the pop formula. Having someone like that in the process was really rewarding and totally different, but really interesting." "New Kicks" was described by the band's publicist as "a dance anthem made up of samples of anti-war speeches by Susan Sarandon, Al Sharpton, and others, punctuated by a 'Peace Up, War Down!' chant". The song's chants were recorded at the 15 February anti-war protests in Manhattan by JD Samson, and its sampled chant approach was compared to "Dyke March 2001", an earlier Le Tigre song (from Feminist Sweepstakes). "Viz" is about JD Samson, and her experiences as a butch lesbian.

== Release and promotion ==
"It was time for a change for us. I was bored doing the same thing over and over and kind of exhausted from 15 years of touring with no help. I'm 36 years old so I'm kind of like tired of driving the van myself and not getting enough sleep. ... It was like, 'We have to make a big change or we're going to break up.'"

— Kathleen Hanna discussing why the band signed to Strummer/Universal.

In 2004, the band's label, Mr. Lady, notified the band ahead of time they were going to stop releasing new music. After some discussion, Le Tigre decided signed to major label Universal Records through Strummer, an imprint label run by Gary Gersh, the ex-president of Capitol Records. The band decided to sign to a major label due to the band's exhaustion of touring with no support, and because it would have given the band's politics and message greater exposure into the mainstream. "It's about time a feminist group got a little love from the mainstream", Kathleen Hanna said, defending Le Tigre's move to a major label. "It made sense on a lot of levels, and all of our friends and close fans have been incredibly supportive."

This Island was released through Strummer/Universal on October 19, 2004, two weeks before the 2004 US presidential election. The vinyl release was handled by the band's own label, Le Tigre Records, and distributed by Touch & Go Records. "New Kicks" was released as the album's first single by the label ahead of the 2004 Republican National Convention, something the band was not expecting to happen. The song's music video featured the band wearing "Stop Bush Now!" outfits, which despite being warned against by Universal as being too partisan, they wore anyway. Le Tigre also promoted the album through tours in North America and Europe from 2004 to 2005, including performances at the Coachella Valley Music and Arts Festival 2004 and on Late Night with Conan O'Brien in April 2005, where they performed "TKO". They were also scheduled to appear at Lollapalooza 2004, but was cancelled due to the festival's poor ticket sales.

In 2005, Le Tigre released a remix album, This Island Remixes, through Le Tigre Records.

== Commercial performance ==
The album peaked at number 130 on the Billboard 200 chart, remaining on the chart for one week. As of 2008, the album has sold 90,000 copies in the US. The album's singles "TKO" and "After Dark" peaked at numbers 50 and 63 in the UK, respectively.

== Critical reception ==
Professional ratings
Aggregate scores
Source	Rating
Metacritic	66/100
Review scores
Source	Rating
AllMusic	4/5 stars
The A.V. Club	positive
Blender	2/5 stars
Robert Christgau	(2-star Honorable Mention)
Drowned in Sound	7/10 stars
The Guardian	3/5 stars
Pitchfork	3.3/10
PopMatters	9/10 stars
Rolling Stone	3/5 stars
Stylus Magazine	D+

This Island received generally favorable reviews from music critics. On Metacritic, which assigns a normalized rating out of 100 to reviews from mainstream critics, the album received an average score of 66, based on 28 reviews.

Katie Zerwas of PopMatters gave the band high praise for utilizing its new-found mainstream backing to craft dance-rock material that's both entertaining and mindful of their stance on gender politics, concluding with, "Smart and sexy, political and provocative, Le Tigre is the best and brightest of feminist rock." Rob Theakston of AllMusic also applauded the band for putting a commercial sheen over their usual new wave formula while still retaining their ability to deliver biting commentary, concluding that "Of all the groups Universal could have chosen from this tired, depressing movement, they certainly chose the most honest and promising of the bunch and one whose full potential is just now starting to flourish." Pat Blashill of Rolling Stone praised the upbeat production and confident lyricism for voicing the band's social problems, saying that "If Clear Channel didn't have the airwaves on lockdown, This Island would turn the thirteen-year-old girls of this nation into singing, stomping, rioting mobs demanding r-e-s-p-e-c-t."

Alex Petridis of The Guardian was mixed about the album, saying that the production captures the band's live shows and political message but was put off by the vocal delivery, concluding that "money cannot change vocalist Kathleen Hanna's tendency to sound snotty rather than angry, which frequently leaves you feeling like you're being harangued by Buffy the Vampire Slayer's right-on classmate." Pitchfork writer Nick Sylvester criticized the album for taking less risks with the band's attempt at commercializing its genre-hopping political tracks to the mainstream masses, concluding that it "ends up being merely a squandered opportunity, which sadly sums up This Island as well." Derek Miller of Stylus Magazine felt the album toned down the band's penchant for delivering upbeat socio-political tracks that comes across more slick but soulless in its social message, saying that, "This Island is expertly produced at times, with a crisp, micro-edged flaunt that belies their gauche political discourse."

== Track listing ==
All tracks are written by Kathleen Hanna, Johanna Fateman and JD Samson, except where noted.

No.	Title	Writer(s)	Length
1.	"On the Verge"		3:31
2.	"Seconds"		1:45
3.	"Don't Drink Poison"		2:49
4.	"After Dark"		3:39
5.	"Nanny Nanny Boo Boo"		3:35
6.	"TKO"		3:24
7.	"Tell You Now"		3:33
8.	"New Kicks"		3:34
9.	"Viz"		3:34
10.	"This Island"		2:23
11.	"I'm So Excited (Pointer Sisters cover)"	Trevor Lawrence, Anita Pointer, June Pointer, Ruth Pointer	3:49
12.	"Sixteen"		3:25
13.	"Punker Plus"		2:10
14.	"Nanny Nanny Boo Boo" (Arthur Baker vs Coleman & Spencer Smashter mix) (UK bonus track)		3:54
Total length:			43:21

== Charts ==
Charts (2004)	Peak position
US Billboard 200	130
US Billboard Top Heatseekers	5
