= Tracy + the Plastics =

American electropop and video project group

- Origin: Olympia, Washington, United States
- Genres: Electropop
- Members: Wynne Greenwood

Tracy + the Plastics is an American electropop and video project group from Olympia, Washington, United States. The members include Nikki Romanos on keyboard, Cola on drums, and Tracy as the lead vocals. Although the name implied the group was made up of a lead singer and back up musicians, all three characters were performed by Wynne Greenwood, a lesbian feminist artist using video projection, who calls herself a representative of the "lesbo for disco" generation.

== About ==
Tracy + the Plastics' music consisted of a Boss DR-5 drum machine, an Akai 612 disc sampler, and combines lo-fi filmmaking, performance art, Devo-styled songs, and feminist and queer politics in an entertaining package. During live performances Nikki and Cola would perform and exist only through projected video previously recorded, and through the performance, the band members would communicate with each other

Tracy + the Plastics was the ultimate result of two other projects Wynne created, the first of these being called The Tooth, then The OK Miss Suit. "Tracy + the Plastics came from this choose-your-own-adventure murder mystery movie I was writing. The Plastics were a group of girls who ran a pawn shop and replaced parts of themselves with hyper-colorful pieces of plastic. Their town was never-ending, gray drab, surrounded by super-tall mountains that people lived on top of. Bits of plastic debris would fall down the mountains, and the Plastics (Nikki, Cola, Tracy, and Honeyface) would find and use the debris, like a red toothpaste cap for a tooth or something like that."

In 2005, Tracy + the Plastics recorded a version of the Lesbians on Ecstasy song "Summer Luv", which was released on that band's LP of remixes, Giggles In The Dark.

== Performances ==
- 2004 Whitney Biennale.
- 2005 The Room with Fawn Krieger in The Kitchen, New York
  - This performance was meant to re-imagine the 1970s feminist consciousness by exploring the notions of identity and communication, and question the present state of radical feminism. A way of finding homes within a home, by constructing a grey area for feminists.
- 2006 The Room with Fawn Krieger in The Moore Space, Miami
  - A continued performance of The ROOM from New York where the audience and is connected to the performance space in a domestic setting, attempting to interrupt linear narratives and physical space, questioning binary systems, emphasizing process, and raising conversations between the temporary and the permanent.
  - In June 2006, Wynne Greenwood called an end to the Tracy + The Plastics project.
- 2014 "Stacy" at Cooley Gallery in Portland Oregon
  - The reform of Tracy + the Plastics as way of nurturing Tracy + the Plastics into contact and conversation with its own future, creating a queering space of intimacy, humor, and hope.
- September 2015- January 2016 "Kelly" at New Museum in New York
  - Bringing into dialogue with more recent work exploring the artists interest in what she called "Culture Healing". "Kelly" considered the poetics of the pause while mining electric gaps of meaning in conversation and offering possibilities for feminist, queer, and other experimental models of collaboration and dialogue

== Interaction between Greenwood and the Plastics ==
The performances are a mix between the music that they produce and conversations between Tracy, Nikki, and Cola as well as the various thing that they do during their performances like Colas losing her wallet during a performance, Nikki forgetting how to start a song not from the middle with a disinterested gaze, and all three trying to figure out where the president lives (all of which happened during a performance at The Trunkspace in Phoenix, AZ in 2002). The performances are perfectly timed together as Greenwood acts out each role with precise timing. Through the projections, all three members are linked together in the same space like a basement or a car.

Greenwood discusses everyday things with her comrades as Tracy like the hair on her nipple, getting off of work, and dying logs, a play on words for 'dialogue' (again taking place at The Trunkspace in Phoenix, AZ in 2002). The three band mates act as though they are all physically present and sharing the same space, like Cola asking if she can borrow Tracy's can of spray paint and speak as if they were actual friends, like Cola asking if the sign was straight then spraying two female symbols underneath, to make it less straight/more gay (from Spring Tour Performance in 2001). They perform a sound track with one another and tell complain when they find each other annoying (Spring Tour Performance, 2001). During one performance, Nikki and Cola asked to be called Nicole instead of their actual names, as if Tracy wasn't aware that they had changed their minds at some point (from "World" performance, 2004).

Greenwood crafted each character to be their own individual person, more different from the last. She somehow created a friend group that meshes well together and defends their queer bodies and politics while making music with an attractive beat. Tracy, Cola, and Nikki give each other subtle glances throughout their performances and stop promptly when someone needs a break or needs to say something like if they know another friend (from "World" performance in 2004). She has created a background and lives outside of performing for each of the girls like the fact that Cola broke her wrist and is wearing a cast while the other girls are not and how they each came out differently, like how Nikki came out through while Tracy came out over the phone (from "World" performance, 2004).

Greenwood has managed to create a band with multiple personalities and figures from one woman, and make the experience feel like a real performance from any alternative band. During a performance, Cola blanks out and Tracy repeatedly has to call her name to capture her attention (from "Can You Pause That For A Second…" from 2003). During the very same video the camera angle changes to move as Tracy would so that the audience cans see what she would essentially see. Tracy and Nikki later on in the video cover Cola from the audience's eyes as she changes and that would have been inappropriate to do so in front of strangers. Greenwood has made it so that Cola and Nikki are conscious of the universe in which they do not exist and make them sensitive to the real needs of people, like the act of privacy and shame.

== Feminism ==
In a 2001 essay, Greenwood discusses Tracy + the Plastics and performances in relation to her feminist beliefs. She explains "When an individual in a marginalized group talks to a recorded image of themselves it empowers the individual to open the door to the understanding and celebration that he/she/it can be deliberate. It is an interaction with a fragment self. By fragment, I mean a cohesive identity that's constructed from different often conflicting, parts of society, culture, and life that we relate to because popular culture has no whole identity to offer its audience other than one that resembles the ruling class. We can come out. And then come out again. We can rearrange our world how we want it." As well "a Tracy + the Plastics performance attempts to destroy the inherent hierarchical dynamic of those "spaces"by placing as much importance on the video image (the Plastics) as the live performer (Tracy). The front interacts with the back in a way that emphasizes their equality and the dependence on one another to dismantle their roles and prescribed boundaries."

== Reviews ==
In Art Forum International (Summer 2005), Johanna Burton describes Tracy + the Plastics as "lo-fi, split-personality hallucination". As well the band members "are all only slightly modified renditions of Greenwood herself- less alter egos or highly evolved personae that seemingly playacted brand of critical levity operates to question, affirm, and confuse both existential and constructed notions of 'the self'.".

In 2004, cultural critic Sara Marcus, writing for The Advocate, said that Tracy + the Plastics's performance art "successfully crosses borders between high art and pop music." Marcus described the act's 2004 album Culture for Pigeon as "elecntronic dance punk" with "complex rhythmic sensibilities" and "increasingly off-kilter beats." [1]

== Discography ==
- Turn Video (Heartcore Records, 2000)
- Muscler's Guide to Videonics (Chainsaw Records, 2001)
- Forever Sucks EP (Chainsaw Records, 2002)
- Culture for Pigeon (Troubleman Unlimited Records, 2004)
- Knit a Claw Re-Do (Too Pure Records, 2004)
- Real Damage Split EP with The Gossip (Dim Mak Records, 2005)

=== Compilation tracks ===
- "Oh Maria" – Calling All Kings & Queens (Mr. Lady Records, 2001)
- "Dead Face" – Nothing Fancy Just Music 7" (NFJM Records, 2003)
