= Mr. Lady Records =

Independent record label

- Founded: 1996
- Founder: Kaia Wilson; Tammy Rae Carland
- Defunct: 2004
- Status: Defunct
- Genre: Feminist
- Country of origin: United States
- Location: Durham, North Carolina; San Francisco, California

Mr. Lady Records (or Mr. Lady Records and Video) was a San Francisco-based lesbian-feminist independent record label and video art distributor. Artists on the label included Le Tigre and The Butchies. OutSmart magazine noted that Mr. Lady was "queercore's strongest label."

The label was founded in 1996 in Durham, North Carolina by musician Kaia Wilson and artist/UNC photography professor Tammy Rae Carland, aiming to redress what they saw as a lack of feminist record labels at the time. As well as a range of recording artists, the label was also heavily involved in other events that promoted feminist thinking and music, as well as various art showcases. Mr. Lady closed down in June 2004.

== Founding ==
Kaia Wilson was a member of lesbian punk group The Butchies, and felt their "out politics held them back." Without a record company to specifically represent the work of herself and other "out" female musicians, Wilson and her girlfriend, Tammy Rae Carland, found their opportunities limited. Subsequently, they formed Mr. Lady to redress the "lack of enough women and/or dyke run record labels," which they felt led to an "extremely limited amount of affordable and accessible means for independent artists to distribute their work." Thus, Mr. Lady Records was started with, in Wilson's words, "$35 and a lotta...faith."

(Our music is) feminist music: strong women-identified women playing music. That doesn't necessarily fall into a genre but describes the people playing. To me, we are women's music.

— Kaia Wilson

Wilson stated the name "Mr. Lady" came from a trip to Italy while on tour with Team Dresch: "I saw a store called Mr. Baby, and it freaked me out. Then everyone started calling me Mr. Baby. Then I became Mr. Baby onstage. I had my own theme song and everything. I wore a little eyeliner mustache. From there it changed into Mr. Lady, which just seemed like a good name for a queer label." It also related to Ladyman, Wilson's first solo LP, produced with the aid of Melissa York after they both left lesbian "supergroup" Team Dresch.

== Artists and releases ==
Mr. Lady Records released recordings by groups such as Kathleen Hanna's lo-fi group Le Tigre (who released their first two records – Le Tigre and Feminist Sweepstakes – with Mr. Lady), punk group The Butchies (of whom Kaia Wilson is the lead singer), British group Electrelane, Tara Jane O'Neil, spoken-word collective Sister Spit (Sini Anderson and Michelle Tea), and others. In March 2001, Calling All Kings & Queens, a sampler album, was released which featured eighteen tracks from various artists and friends of the label, including Sleater-Kinney and Team Dresch. It followed 1999's New Women's Music Sampler.

Initially, no band that signed with Mr. Lady contained a male artist. Carland said "It's not that we're necessarily never going to put out a band with men in it, but it's just kind of organically happened that way. We wanted to focus on putting out music by women. We do consider ourselves a feminist business and part of that involves prioritizing work made by women."

Due to their work with Mr. Lady, Wilson and Carland were described as two of the "100 most influential gay people in the world" by About.com in 2002.

== Growing popularity ==
Although initially a vehicle for Wilson to release her own albums, Mr. Lady grew into a label whose musical and political contributions gained national attention. During a review of Tami Hart's debut release with Mr. Lady, online magazine PopMatters described the label as "one of the bright spots in new music. Whether the groups or singers are punk or indie, they are all anti-mainstream hip, political, and good – really good." Discorder magazine described the label in 2004 as "lead[ing] the way when it came to releasing music that was as politically significant as it was danceable."

Initially distributing music through mail order, the label signed a deal to distribute records nationally across the US in 2001. The Independent Weekly described the label as having "grown from a community that perhaps needed it the most," contrasting the scarcity of a gay/lesbian-oriented label in the southern United States at the time with the many in New York.

== Involvement with the Michigan Womyn's Music Festival ==
Mr Lady logo used for the Mr. Sister event

In 1999, Mr. Lady records (along with one of its artists, The Butchies), were involved in issues surrounding the debate as to whether transgender women should be entitled to attend the Michigan Womyn's Music Festival, which had a formal stance against allowing transsexual and transgender women to attend the festival. In response to a request from transgender activists to boycott the festival, Mr. Lady released a statement which defended the festival, believing that they did not consider an event for "womyn born womyn" and the transgender community to be mutually exclusive, but backed the right of the festival to exclude those not assigned female at birth.

Kaia Wilson confirmed this in a June 1999 statement: "[W]e strongly believe that transgender/transsexual people are an important part of the queer community and that they face an enormous amount of opposition. [...] We know that the MWMF started as a separatist event for womyn born womyn and we personally still feel the continued need for that kind of space and event. [...] We don't think that our support of the trans communities and womyn born womyn communities are in direct contradiction to each other."

Formally backing the festival's trans-exclusion policy led to protests and boycotts aimed towards Mr. Lady acts, Wilson and The Butchies in particular. Groups such as Camp Trans, and many participants in the queercore community, disagreed with Mr. Lady's stance and felt that the group and label exploited transgender images. The label went defunct in June 2004.

== Showcases ==
Mr. Lady Records has sponsored numerous showcases of feminist and lesbian music, including events at the Weisman Art Museum at the University of Minnesota Twin Cities campus in Minneapolis, Minnesota (working with the Queer Student Cultural Center) and "Mr. Sister", a showcase at the National Queer Arts Festival in 2003 at the Center for Lesbian Gay Bi Transgender Art & Culture in San Francisco.

== Artists formerly on Mr. Lady ==
Sticker used on Mr. Lady vinyl releases.

Artists formerly on Mr. Lady include:

- The Butchies
- Sarah Dougher
- Electrelane
- The Haggard
- Tami Hart
- Kiki and Herb
- Le Tigre
- The Moves
- The Need
- Tara Jane O'Neil
- Gretchen Phillips
- Amy Ray
- Sextional
- Radio Sloan
- The Sissies
- Sister Spit
- Tracy + the Plastics
- V for Vendetta
- Kaia Wilson

== In popular culture ==
The label's name appears in the lyrics of the Le Tigre song "Hot Topic."

== See also ==
- List of record labels
