= Le Tigre =

American electronic rock band

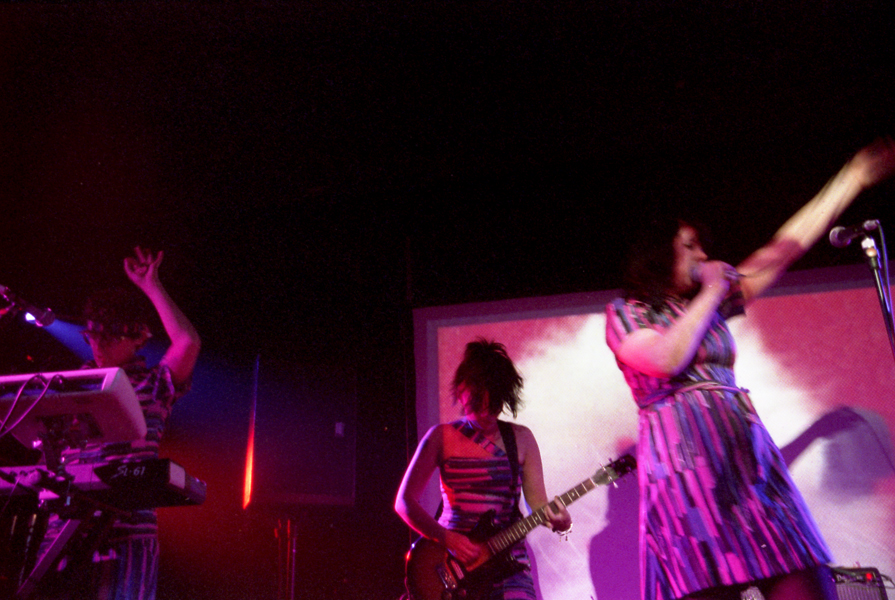
- Le Tigre performing in 2004

Background information
- Origin: New York City, New York, U.S.
- Genres: Electronic rock; riot grrrl; electroclash; dance-punk
- Years active: 1998–2007; 2010; 2016; 2022–present
- Labels: Mr. Lady; Strummer; Universal; Le Tigre
- Spinoffs: The Julie Ruin; MEN
- Spinoff of: Bikini Kill
- Members: Kathleen Hanna; Johanna Fateman; JD Samson
- Past members: Sadie Benning
- Website: letigre.world

Le Tigre (/lə ˈtiːɡrə/, French pronunciation: [lə tiɡʁ]; French for "The Tiger") is an American art punk and riot grrrl band formed by Kathleen Hanna (of Bikini Kill), Johanna Fateman and Sadie Benning in 1998 in New York City. Benning left in 2000 and was replaced by JD Samson. They mixed punk's directness and politics with playful samples, eclectic pop, and lo-fi electronics. Like with many bands in and from the riot grrrl movement, many of the lyrics addressed feminist themes and ideas. The group also added multimedia and performance art elements to their live shows, which often featured support from like-minded acts such as the Need.

The band released three full-length albums and toured extensively until 2007, when they announced a hiatus due to exhaustion. After a series of brief reunions to work with artists like Christina Aguilera and Pussy Riot, the band reunited in 2023 for a largely sold out tour of Europe and North America.

They have been the subject of some minor controversies, including criticism for their participation in the trans-exclusionary Michigan Womyn's Music Festival in the early 2000s, and a settled 2021 copyright infringement lawsuit targeting their most popular song, "Deceptacon" (1999).

== History ==
=== 1998–2000: Formation and Le Tigre ===
Following the breakup of Bikini Kill in 1998, Kathleen Hanna released a solo album under the pseudonym Julie Ruin and moved to New York, where she wanted to perform Julie Ruin songs live. Not wanting to perform the material alone, she recruited Johanna Fateman, whom Hanna had known since meeting at a Bikini Kill concert several years prior. Sadie Benning, who had helped Hanna make a music video for the Julie Ruin song "Aerobicide", also joined in order to help with visuals and translating the music into performable material. These performances never happened, and instead resulted in the formation of a new band entirely, Le Tigre.

While Benning was still in Chicago, Hanna and Fateman began sharing cassettes between the three band members, with songs that would eventually become material for Le Tigre. They took their name from one of many hypothetical bands made up by Hanna c. 1994.

The band signed with Mr. Lady Records, a label founded in San Francisco by Hanna's friend Tammy Rae Carland and her then-girlfriend Kaia Wilson. Hanna called the signing "a logical choice" because of the label's greater political commitment over their music releases.

The band's first album, Le Tigre, was released in October 1999. The band's original live performances consisted of Hanna, Fateman and Sadie performing music, along with JD Samson, a roadie they had met in September 1999, who manually operated a slideshow as a visual component to their music, as the band could not afford a projector at the time.

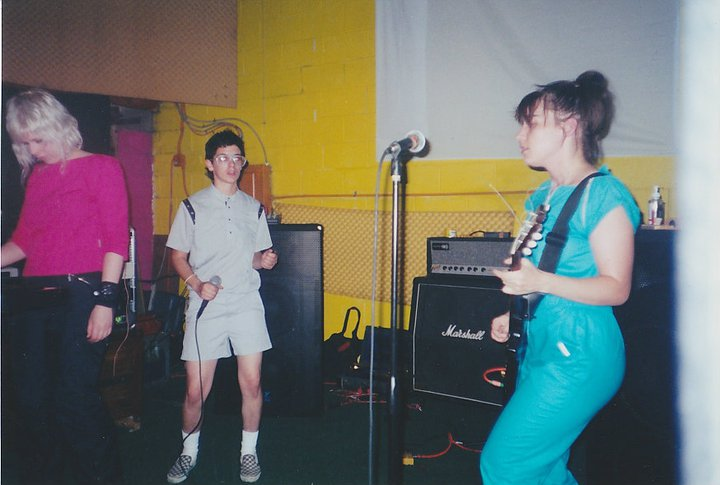
Le Tigre performing in Indianapolis, Indiana, in the early 2000s

=== 2000–2004: From The Desk of Mr. Lady EP and Feminist Sweepstakes ===
In 2000, Benning left the band to focus on filmmaking. As the band was already into a month-long tour, they asked Samson to fill in during live performances. The band had already been considering increasing the involvement of Samson as possibly a backup singer or dancer, so they asked them to become an official member. Hanna remarked that "JD added an undeniable flair and charisma to the live show and took to touring and recording like a fish to water."

In October 2001, the band released their second album, Feminist Sweepstakes.

In 2003, Le Tigre collaborated with Chicks on Speed on their cover of Tom Tom Club's "Wordy Rappinghood" from their album 99 Cents along with other artists such as Miss Kittin, Kevin Blechdom, ADULT.'s Nicola Kuperus, and Tina Weymouth of Tom Tom Club. The cover became a moderate dance hit in Europe, peaking at number five on the Belgian Dance Chart, and at number sixty-six on the UK Singles Chart.

=== 2004–2007: Major label deal, This Island and hiatus ===
In March 2004, Le Tigre signed with Strummer, a subsidiary of major label Universal Records, a move described by Kathleen Hanna as a make-or-break for the band, who were considering breaking up due to exhaustion. In June 2004, Mr. Lady closed down, and the band began reissuing their back catalogue under their own label, Le Tigre Records, with distribution from Touch & Go Records.

They released their debut major-label album, This Island, in October 2004. The album was a moderate success, selling over 90,000 copies in the US.

The band entered a "long hiatus" in August 2007, due to the band being burnt out from touring This Island, and the band members wanting to "do their own thing".

=== 2010–present: Brief reunions ===
In 2010, Le Tigre briefly returned from a hiatus to produce Christina Aguilera's "My Girls", from her sixth studio album Bionic. The track features Peaches.

Le Tigre members JD Samson and Johanna Fateman collaborated with Russian activist punk rock collective Pussy Riot during a concert organised by Vice magazine in 2014, performing Le Tigre's “Deceptacon”. Later, in 2015, they reunited with Pussy Riot to record a song and video for Netflix series House of Cards.

In September 2016, the band announced they were reuniting just to release a "special song". On October 19, 2016, Le Tigre released the song, titled "I'm With Her", and its accompanying video to voice their support of the 2016 Democratic presidential nominee, Hillary Clinton.

In December 2021, the band announced they would be getting together to play at This Ain't No Picnic Festival in 2022.

In January 2023, the band announced they would be reuniting for the first tour in eighteen years.

== Controversies ==
=== Involvement in Michigan Womyn's Music Festival ===
Le Tigre, along with several other acts from Mr. Lady Records, played at the Michigan Womyn's Music Festival in 2001 and 2005. The festival became controversial for its "womyn-born womyn" stance, which excluded trans women from the festival. Their performance at the festival drew criticism from some fans who accused Le Tigre and other acts of transphobia. Both Le Tigre and The Butchies received verbal harassment and death threats from critics of their participation in the 2001 festival.

In 2013, JD Samson, who identifies as genderqueer, made multiple posts on Tumblr denouncing the festival's exclusion of trans women and announcing that she would not perform at the festival until all self-identified women were included.

The festival shut down in 2015.

=== Deceptacon copyright lawsuit ===
In October 2021, Hanna and Fateman countersued singer-songwriter Barry Mann, who sent the band cease-and-desist letters after claiming the song "Deceptacon" was infringing the copyright on his song "Who Put the Bomp (in the Bomp, Bomp, Bomp)". Hanna and Fateman argued that the use of "bomp" was transformative of the song and was also a critique of the messaging in Mann's song. They settled the case in November 2021, with the dispute "amicably resolved by a confidential settlement agreement without any public admission of liability", according to Pitchfork.

== Band members ==
Current members

- Kathleen Hanna – vocals, guitars, bass guitar, drums, drum machines, sampler (1998–2007, 2010, 2016, 2022)
- Johanna Fateman – vocals, guitars, keyboards (1998–2007, 2010, 2016, 2022)
- JD Samson – vocals, synthesizers, production, trumpet, guitars, sampler (2000–2007, 2010, 2016, 2022)

Former members

- Sadie Benning – vocals, guitars (1998–2000)

== Discography ==
- Le Tigre (1999)
- Feminist Sweepstakes (2001)
- This Island (2004)
