= Girl Germs =

Feminist zine published in Oregon

- Issue 1 of Girl Germs
- Categories: Riot grrrl
- Founder: Allison Wolfe; Molly Neuman
- Founded: 1990
- First issue: December 1990

Girl Germs was a zine created by University of Oregon students Allison Wolfe and Molly Neuman, both members of the band Bratmobile.

Feminism was influential in the Pacific Northwest in the early nineties: Girl Germs identified feminist role models in its early issues and was one of the few Riot grrrl zines created by young white women to feature African American rappers.

The first issue of Girl Germs was completed by December 1990. While home in Washington, D.C., on winter break, Neuman made several hundred copies of the zine at the Capitol Hill offices of Arizona Representative Mo Udall, who she had worked for during high school.

Contributors to Girl Germs included Kathleen Hanna; Jean Smith of Mecca Normal; Sue P. Fox; Kaia Wilson; the editors of Double Bill, G.B. Jones, Jena von Brücker, Caroline Azar, Johnny Noxzema and Rex; Jen Smith; and Erin Smith of Bratmobile. Groups interviewed by Girl Germs editors include Calamity Jane, Unrest, 7 Year Bitch, Jawbox and Fastbacks.

Girl Germs also documents the coming together of Bratmobile, during this time. Allison would go on to play with Cold Cold Hearts, Partyline, and Hawnay Troof and Molly played with The Frumpies and The PeeChees.

Archives that have copies of Girl Germs include the GLBT Historical Society in San Francisco, California, the Independent Publishing Resource Center in Portland, Oregon, Duke University in Durham, North Carolina, the D.C. punk and indie fanzine collection at the University of Maryland Libraries, and Barnard College.
