= List of accolades received by Jigarthanda (2014 film) =

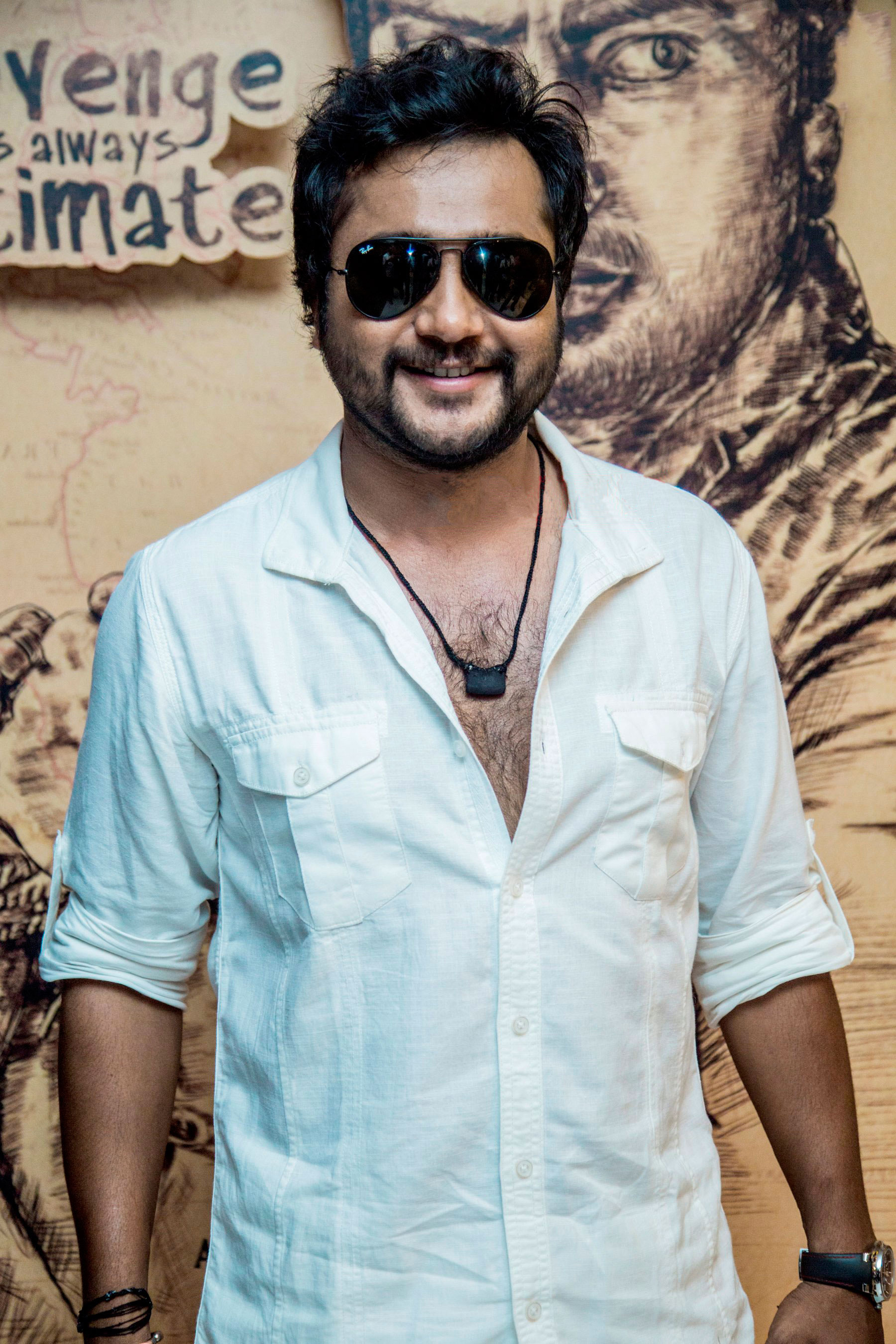
- Bobby Simha received several awards and nominations for his performance in the film.
Accolades
Award	Won	Nominated
Ananda Vikatan Cinema Awards	2	2
Edison Awards	1	1
Filmfare Awards South	1	1
National Film Awards	2	2
Norway Tamil Film Festival Awards	4	4
South Indian International Movie Awards	1	7
Tamil Nadu State Film Awards	1	1
Vijay Awards	5	9
- Total number of awards and nominations (Note: Awards in certain categories do not have prior nominations and only winners are announced by the jury. For simplification and to avoid errors, each award in this list has been presumed to have had a prior nomination.)
Totals	17	27
- References]]

Jigarthanda (transl. Cold hearted) is a 2014 Indian Tamil-language crime film written and directed by Karthik Subbaraj, and produced by S. Kathiresan of Group Company. The film stars Siddharth and Bobby Simha in leading roles, with a supporting cast consists of Lakshmi Menon, Karunakaran and Guru Somasundaram amongst others. The cinematography for the film is composed by Gavemic U. Ary, and editing is done by Vivek Harshan. The film's soundtrack and background score is composed by Santhosh Narayanan.

Partially inspired by the Korean-language film A Dirty Carnival (2006), Jigarthanda revolves around Karthik (Siddharth) an aspring filmmaker, gets a chance to make a film based on gangsterism, in order to impress a highbrow film director, who critiqued his earlier attempts. In the process, he goes to Madurai, to research about a merciless gangster named Assault Sethu (Simha), who will not hesitate to murder those who try to even write about him.

Released on 1 August 2014, Jigarthanda received critical acclaim from critics and audiences, who praised Subbaraj's writing and direction, the performances of the cast, particularly that of Bobby Simha, and other technical aspects: including cinematography, music, editing. In addition to being a profitable venture for the exhibitors upon its theatrical run, the film was further deemed as one of the most technically brilliant films in Tamil cinema.

The film has won 16 awards from 26 nominations. In March 2015, the film received two National Film Awards for Best Supporting Actor (Bobby Simha) and Best Editing (Vivek Harshan). Simha further won a Filmfare Award for Best Supporting Actor, an Edison Award for Best Villain and a SIIMA Award for Best Supporting Actor, which was the only win at the ceremony as the film received seven nominations. Simha was also nominated for Best Actor in a Negative Role at the same ceremony, but lost to Neil Nitin Mukesh for Kaththi. It was nominated and won two categories at the Ananda Vikatan Cinema Awards: Best Music Director (Santhosh Narayanan), (Note: Also for Cuckoo and Madras) and Best Cinematographer (Gavemic U. Ary). The film received nine nominations at the 9th Vijay Awards and won five – Best Director (Karthik Subbaraj), Best Villain (Simha), Best Cinematographer (Gavemic U. Ary), Best Editor (Vivek Harshan) and Best Background Score (Santhosh Narayanan). In July 2017, The Tamil Nadu government announced State Film Awards for films being released in the period 2009–2014, where Simha won a Special Prize for Best Actor.

== Awards and nominations ==
Award (Note: Awards, festivals and organisations are in alphabetical order.)	Date of ceremony (Note: Date is linked to the article about the awards held that year, wherever possible.)	Category	Recipient(s)	Result	Ref(s)
Ananda Vikatan Cinema Awards	8 January 2015	Best Music Director	Santhosh Narayanan	Won	
Ananda Vikatan Cinema Awards	8 January 2015	Best Cinematographer	Gavemic U. Ary	Won	
Edison Awards	15 February 2015	Best Villain	Bobby Simha	Won	
Filmfare Awards South	26 June 2015	Best Supporting Actor – Tamil	Bobby Simha	Won	
National Film Awards	24 March 2015	Best Supporting Actor	Bobby Simha	Won	
National Film Awards	24 March 2015	Best Editor	Vivek Harshan	Won	
Norway Tamil Film Festival Awards	23–26 April 2015	Best Actor	Siddharth (Note: Also for Kaaviya Thalaivan)	Won	
Norway Tamil Film Festival Awards	23–26 April 2015	Best Character Actor	Bobby Simha	Won	
Norway Tamil Film Festival Awards	23–26 April 2015	Best Editor	Vivek Harshan	Won	
Norway Tamil Film Festival Awards	23–26 April 2015	Best Music Director	Santhosh Narayanan (Note: Also for Cuckoo)	Won	
South Indian International Movie Awards	6–7 August 2015	Best Film – Tamil	S. Kathiresan	Nominated	
South Indian International Movie Awards	6–7 August 2015	Best Director – Tamil	Karthik Subbaraj	Nominated	
South Indian International Movie Awards	6–7 August 2015	Best Actor – Tamil	Siddharth	Nominated	
South Indian International Movie Awards	6–7 August 2015	Best Actress – Tamil	Lakshmi Menon	Nominated	
South Indian International Movie Awards	6–7 August 2015	Best Supporting Actor – Tamil	Bobby Simha	Won	
South Indian International Movie Awards	6–7 August 2015	Best Actor in a Negative Role – Tamil	Bobby Simha	Nominated	
South Indian International Movie Awards	6–7 August 2015	Best Cinematographer – Tamil	Gavemic U. Ary	Nominated	
Tamil Nadu State Film Awards	13 July 2017	Special Prize (Best Actor)	Bobby Simha	Won	
Vijay Awards	25 April 2015	Best Film	S. Kathiresan	Nominated	
Vijay Awards	25 April 2015	Best Director	Karthik Subbaraj	Won	
Vijay Awards	25 April 2015	Best Supporting Actor	Guru Somasundaram	Nominated	
Vijay Awards	25 April 2015	Best Villain	Bobby Simha	Won	
Vijay Awards	25 April 2015	Best Cinematographer	Gavemic U. Ary	Won	
Vijay Awards	25 April 2015	Best Editor	Vivek Harshan	Won	
Vijay Awards	25 April 2015	Best Background Score	Santhosh Narayanan	Won	
Vijay Awards	25 April 2015	Best Story, Screenplay Writer	Karthik Subbaraj	Nominated	
Vijay Awards	25 April 2015	Best Makeup	Vinoth Sukumaran	Nominated	

== See also ==
- List of Tamil films of 2014
