= Cold, Cold Heart (disambiguation) =

"Cold, Cold Heart" is a 1950 song by Hank Williams.

Cold, Cold Heart or Cold Cold Hearts may also refer to:

== Music ==
- Cold Cold Heart (band), an American alternative country band
- Cold, Cold Heart (band), a British post rock band
- Cold Cold Hearts, an American punk band
  - Cold Cold Hearts (album), 1997
- "Cold Cold Heart" (Wet Wet Wet song), 1993
- "Cold, Cold Heart", a song by Midge Ure from the 1991 album Pure
- "Cold, Cold Heart", a song by the Mighty Lemon Drops from the 1991 albun Sound ... Goodbye to Your Standards, 1991
- "Cold, cold heart", lyrics of Elton John songs "Sacrifice" (1989) and "Cold Heart (Pnau remix)" (2021)

== Other uses ==
- The Trap (British TV series), originally to be called Cold Cold Heart
- Cold Cold Heart, downloadable content of 2013 videogame Batman: Arkham Origins

== See also ==
- Cold Heart (disambiguation)
