= Carlos Cañedo =

American musician (born 1975)

- Also known as: Carlos Yannacañedo, Carlos Debarrios, Carlos Huerta
- Born: September 4, 1975 (age 51)
- Occupations: Guitarist, Singer, Dancer
- Instruments: Guitar, bass and Vocals
- Years active: 1991–present

Carlos Cañedo (born 1975) is an American rock musician, professional Argentine Tango dancer/choreographer, and documentary producer. As a musician, Cañedo performed in American punk rock and hardcore bands The PeeChees, Rice, and Beehive and the Barracudas, releasing albums on indie labels Kill Rock Stars, Lookout! Records, and Sub Pop. He is currently performing in Carlos Cañedo Is Filling Gaps with Adam Horovitz of the Beastie Boys. As a dancer, Cañedo has performed throughout the United States, Canada, Argentina, and Europe and his choreographies have been performed on Broadway and Europe. Carlos was also an associate producer of No No: A Dockumentary, a film about Dock Ellis, the baseball player turned drug abuse counselor who claims to have pitched a no-hitter on LSD. The documentary premiered at the 2014 Sundance Film Festival.

== Musical career ==
Carlos Cañedo first began performing at age 15 in the San Diego–based foodcore band Rice. The band included members of many influential San Diego punk and hardcore bands such as Rop Vasquez of The PeeChees, and Paul O'Beirne of Rocket From The Crypt, Jason Soares of Physics, Matt Anderson of Heroin, and Dustin Millsap of Beehive and the Barracudas. In 1991, the band released a single on the Vinyl Communications label and later an LP on Lookout! Records.

In 1994, Cañedo and fellow Rice member Rop Vasquez moved to the Bay Area and started The PeeChees with Molly Neuman of the Riot Grrrl band Bratmobile and her then-boyfriend Christopher Appelgren, an employee at Lookout! Records. The band released 3 Full-Length LPs on the Olympia-based Kill Rock Stars label, and various singles on various labels including Lookout! Records (which is owned by Appelgren and Neuman) and Subpop. The band toured the United States and Europe before disbanding in 1998. in 1999, the electroclash band Le Tigre sampled Cañedo's guitar riff of The PeeChees song "Fine Watch" for their song "Yr Critique". In 2005, Cañedo and Neuman reunited to play in the New York–based punk rock band Love Or Perish. The band released one album, Start From Zero, and toured the United States and Australia. Cañedo currently plays in Carlos Cañedo Is Filling Gaps with Adam Horovitz and NYC-cabaret singer Bridget Everett.

== Dance career ==
Cañedo began dancing in the 1990s while a member of The PeeChees. He studied Argentine Tango in Buenos Aires and San Francisco. In 2000, Cañedo moved to New York City and began performing in the show Swango and Tangos Pour La Milonga. He has performed in North America (including acclaimed venues such as NYC's Lincoln Center and MetLife Stadium, Montreal's Place des Arts, and San Francisco's Palace Of Fine Arts), Mexico, Europe, and Argentina. His choreographies have been performed in the U.S., Canada, and Europe. In 2011, Cañedo choreographed Romulo Larrea's Tangos From Gardel To Piazzolla, which received a positive review from The New York Times. He is the founder and director of The Tango Company, based in New York City, where he currently resides.

== Discography ==
LPs

- Rice, Fuck You, This Is Rice (Lookout! Records 1994)
- The PeeChees, Do The Math (Kill Rock Stars 1996)
- The PeeChees, Games People Play (Kill Rock Stars 1997)
- The PeeChees, Life (Kill Rock Stars/Damaged Goods 1999)
- Beehive and the Barracudas, Featuring The Insects (Flapping Jet Records 1998)
- Love Or Perish, Start From Zero (Simple Social Graces 2006)

Singles

- Rice, "In Rice We Survive" (Vinyl Communications 1992)
- The PeeChees, "Cup Of Glory" (Kill Rock Stars 1994)
- The PeeChees, "Scented Gum" (Lookout! Records 1995)
- The PeeChees/Long Hind Legs, "Spend Some Time With" (Skinnie Girl 1995)
- The PeeChees, "Love Moods" (Rugger Bugger 1996)
- The PeeChees "Antarticists" (Roxy 1997)
- The PeeChees "Sing Like Me (Elliott Smith)/Other Ice Age" (Damaged Goods 1997)
- The PeeChees "Dallas/If You Don't Know (Now You Know)" (Sub Pop 1998)
- The PeeChees/The Drags, "Radio Disappears" (G.I. Productions Unknown)

Compilations

- Can Of Pork "Rice-The Future" (Lookout! Records 1991)
- Rock Stars Kill "The PeeChees-Patty Coahuila" (Kill Rock Stars 1994)
- Slice Of Lemon "The PeeChees-Maintenance Free" (Lookout! Records/Kill Rock Stars 1995)
- YoYo A Go Go "Unwound-Valentine Card (uncredited)" (Yoyo 1994)
- All Punk Rods "The PeeChees-You Are Not" (Lookout! Records 1998)
- Taking A Chance On Chances "The PeeChees-Second Grade (Troubleman 1998)
