= Girls Get Busy =

Studio album by Bratmobile
- Released: May 7, 2002
- Genres: Punk rock; riot grrrl
- Length: 32:06
- Label: Lookout!

Bratmobile chronology
Ladies, Women and Girls (2000)	Girls Get Busy (2002)

Girls Get Busy is the third and final studio album by Bratmobile, released in 2002 on Lookout! Records.

== Critical reception ==
Professional ratings
Review scores
Source	Rating
AllMusic	3/5 stars
Alternative Press	7/10
Pitchfork	4.9/10
Robert Christgau	(2-star Honorable Mention)
The Rolling Stone Album Guide	3/5 stars

Girls Get Busy features a more polished production than the band's previous releases, and even introduces keyboards to many songs, but the album still represents a clear continuation of the group's original punk sound and riot grrrl spirit.

== Track listing ==
No.	Title	Length
1.	"I'm in the Band"	2:05
2.	"Shop for America"	2:20
3.	"Shut Your Face"	2:49
4.	"Don't Ask Don't Tell"	3:22
5.	"That's Happening"	2:12
6.	"Cryin' Tryin' Lyin'"	3:09
7.	"What's Wrong With You"	2:05
8.	"Idiot Lover"	3:03
9.	"Are You a Lady?"	2:25
10.	"Pagan Baby"	2:08
11.	"Chicken or the Egg"	1:46
12.	"United We Don't"	2:06
13.	"Take the Pain and Use It"	2:06
Total length:		32:06

== Personnel ==
Bratmobile

- Molly Neuman, drums
- Erin Smith, guitar
- Allison Wolfe, vocals

Contributing artists

Filmmaker Audrey Marrs contributed keyboards and background vocals. Additional background vocals were provided by Joey Karam and Andy Peterson; record producer Marty Key is credited for additional guitar and bass.

=== Production ===
The album was produced by Marty Key, Aaron Prellwitz, and Bratmobile. Prellwitz and Brian Barnes served as engineers and mixers. The album cover design was created by Chris Appelgren.
