= Molly Neuman =

American drummer (born 1972)

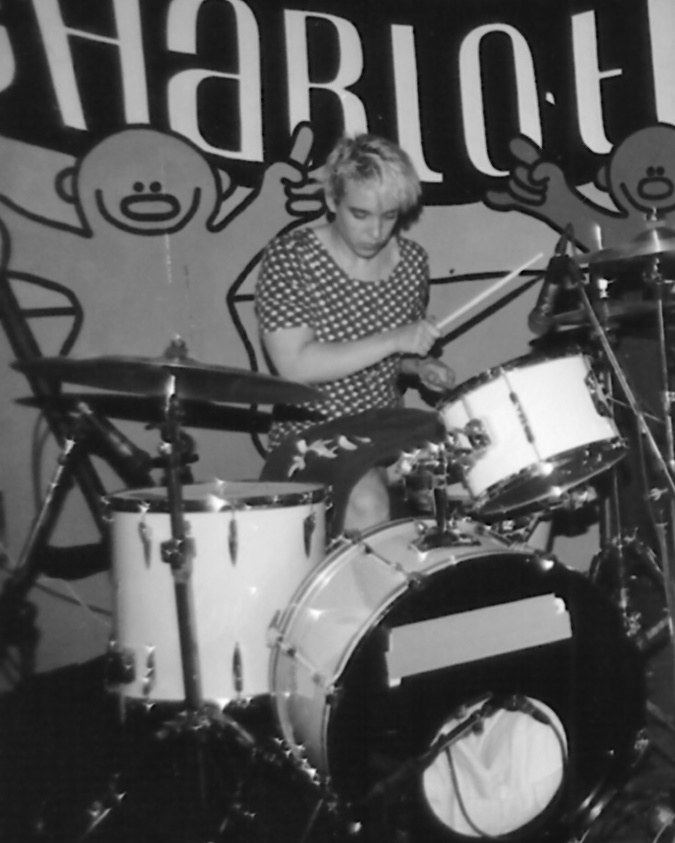
- Neuman in 1994

Background information
- Born: June 18, 1972 (age 53)
- Origin: Washington, D.C. area
- Occupations: Independent musician, zinester, band manager, indie label-organizer
- Instrument: Drums
- Years active: 1990-present
- Labels: Kill Rock Stars; Lookout!; Homestead; Simple Machines; Yoyo Recordings; K; Damaged Goods; Simple Social Graces Discos
- Member of: Bratmobile
- Formerly of: The PeeChees; The Frumpies; Love or Perish!

Molly Neuman (born June 18, 1972) is an American drummer, writer and publisher, originally from the Washington, D.C. area who has performed in such influential bands as Bratmobile, the Frumpies, and the PeeChees. She was a pioneer of the early-to-mid '90s riot grrrl movement, penning the zine which coined the phrase in its title. She also co-wrote Girl Germs with Bratmobile singer Allison Wolfe while the two were students at the University of Oregon; that title later became the name of a Bratmobile song.

== Early life and education ==
Neuman grew up in Washington, D.C. where her father worked for the Democratic National Committee. During high school, she worked for Arizona Representative Mo Udall. She moved across the country in 1989 to attend the University of Oregon in Eugene, Oregon. In the dorms there she met Allison Wolfe.

Together, Neuman and Wolfe took classes in women's studies and music, traveled to Olympia on the weekends, and started collaborating on influential feminist fanzine Girl Germs in 1990.

== Career ==
=== Bratmobile ===
Neuman's and Wolfe's friend Calvin Johnson, an indie musician in the Olympia scene in The Go Team and Beat Happening who also co-owned K Records, asked them to play a show in Olympia on Valentine's Day in 1991 with Bikini Kill and Some Velvet Sidewalk. The band, Bratmobile, played its first show as a two-woman act at Olympia's North Shore Surf Club on February 14, 1991, with Neuman and Wolfe sharing duties on guitar, drums, and vocals.

Neuman was introduced to Erin Smith by Johnson at a Nation of Ulysses concert in Washington D.C. on December 26, 1990. When Neuman, along with Wolfe, visited the city again for spring break in 1991 they asked Smith if she wanted to play music with them, initially joined also by Jen Smith and Christina Billotte. Wolfe, Neuman, and Erin Smith continued on as Bratmobile, playing their first show as a trio at Fort Reno Park in July. The band was active until 1994, when they went on hiatus. They reformed in 1999, but split again in 2003 after two more albums.

=== Other bands ===
In 1992 she started The Frumpies, a lo-fi punk band, with members of Bikini Kill. They released a handful of 7" singles between 1994 and 2000.

From 1996 to 1998 she was a member of The PeeChees, who released two albums on Kill Rock Stars.

=== Zines ===
Whilst students at University of Oregon, Neuman and Wolfe started the feminist zine Girl Germs.

In the summer of 1991 Neuman and Wolfe created the first issue of riot grrrl zine.

=== Music industry career and other roles ===
Neuman co-owned the now-defunct Berkeley-based Lookout! Records with her ex-husband and former PeeChees singer Chris Appelgren and Cathy Bauer.

In 2006 she started her own independent record label called Simple Social Graces Discos and has released records by Les Aus, Campamento Ñec Ñec, Grabba Grabba Tape, Two Tears, Delorean and Love or Perish. She also founded Indivision Management, and has worked as a manager for such artists as the Locust, Ted Leo and the Donnas.

In 2006 she started working for eMusic, before moving to Rhapsody in 2013. In 2014 she was appointed Vice President of the American Association of Independent Music. After having been a founding board member of A2IM when it was first started in 2005.

In 2009, after graduating from the Chef's Training Program at the Natural Gourmet Institute in New York City, Neuman founded a personal chef, catering and health consulting company focusing on natural and whole foods in Brooklyn called Simple Social Kitchen.

In 2016 Neuman was appointed Head of Music for Kickstarter,, in 2017 she was made president of the global publishing administration service Songtrust, and in 2022 as the Chief Marketing Officer for Downtown Music Holdings. In June 2024 she became president of CD Baby.

=== Bratmobile reunion ===
In 2023, Wolfe and Neuman reformed Bratmobile again to perform at the Mosswood Meltdown festival in Oakland, California. Further concerts followed in 2024 and 2025.

== Discography ==
=== With Bratmobile ===
Studio albums

Year	Title	Label	Formats
1993	Pottymouth	Kill Rock Stars	LP/CD/CS
2000	Ladies, Women and Girls	Lookout! Records	CD/LP
2002	Girls Get Busy	Lookout! Records	CD/LP

EPs

- The Real Janelle (1994) LPEP/CDEP (Kill Rock Stars)

Live albums

- The Peel Session CDEP (Strange Fruit)

Singles

- Kiss & Ride 7-inch (Homestead Records)

Split 7-inch

- Tiger Trap/ Bratmobile split 7-inch (4-Letter Words)
- Heavens to Betsy/ Bratmobile split 7-inch (K Records)
- Brainiac/ Bratmobile split 7-inch (12X12)
- Veronica Lake/ Bratmobile split 7-inch (Simple Machines)

Compilation albums

- Kill Rock Stars compilation, CD/LP, (Kill Rock Stars)
- A Wonderful Treat compilation cassette
- The Embassy Tapes cassette
- Throw compilation CD (Yoyo Recordings)
- International Pop Underground live LP/CD/CS (K Records)
- Neapolitan Metropolitan boxed 7-inch set (Simple Machines)
- Teen Beat 100 compilation 7-inch (Teen Beat)
- Julep compilation LP/CD (Yo Yo)
- Wakefield Vol. 2 V/A CD boxed set (Teen Beat)
- Plea For Peace Take Action compilation CD (Sub City)
- Boys Lie compilation CD (Lookout! Records)
- Yoyo A Go Go 1999 compilation CD (Yoyo Recordings)
- Lookout! Freakout Episode 2 compilation CD (Lookout! Records)
- Songs For Cassavetes compilation CD (Better Looking Records)
- Lookout! Freakout Episode 3 CD (Lookout! Records)
- Turn-On Tune-In Lookout! DVD (Lookout! Records)

=== With the Frumpies ===
On Kill Rock Stars:

- Babies & Bunnies (7-inch EP) KRS213, released 1993-08.
- Eunuch Nights (7-inch EP) KRS322, released: 1998-09-23.
- Frumpie One-Piece (CD) KRS335, released: 1998-10-23.
- Frumpies Forever (7-inch EP) KRS366, released: 2000-08-01.

=== With the PeeChees ===
Albums

Year	Title	Label	Other information
1996	Do The Math	Kill Rock Stars	First album.
1997	Games People Play	Kill Rock Stars	Final studio album.
1998	Life	Kill Rock Stars	Compilation of singles and compilation tracks. Released post-breakup.

Singles and EPs

Year	Title	Label	Other information
1994	Cup of Glory	Kill Rock Stars	"Cheap Fun", "Grease" b/w "Fine Watch".
1995	Scented Gum	Lookout! Records	"Genuine Article", "Tea Biscuit to Show" b/w "Olive Oil", "Tom Foolery". Recorded by John Reis and Gar Wood.
1996	Love Moods	Rugger Bugger	"New Moscow Woman" b/w "Quadruple Bypass"
1996	"Antarticists"	Roxy	b/w "Love Is the Law" cover, originally by the Suburbs.
1997	"Sing Like Me (Elliott Smith)"	Damaged Goods	b/w "Other Ice Age". Picture disc
1998	"Dallas"	Sub Pop	b/w "If You Don't Know (Now You Know)". Released as part of the label's limited edition "Single of the Month" series

Non-album tracks

Year	Album/Source	Label	Song(s)	Other information
1994	Rock Stars Kill	Kill Rock Stars	"Patty Coahuila"	First band release. Compilation of Kill Rock Stars bands that included Rancid, Kathleen Hanna, and Team Dresch.
1995	Slice Of Lemon	Lookout! Records/Kill Rock Stars	"Maintenance Free"	Compilation of Lookout! and Kill Rock Stars bands that included Elliott Smith and the Mr. T Experience.
1998	Taking A Chance On Chances	Troubleman Unlimited Records	"Second Grade"	Compilation of bands that included Monorchid.
