= Jigarthanda =

Jigarthanda (transl. Cold Heart) may refer to:

- Jigarthanda (drink), an Indian beverage
- Jigarthanda (2014 film), an Indian Tamil-language film
- Jigarthanda (2016 film), Kannada-language remake of the Tamil film

== See also ==
- Cold Heart (disambiguation)
- Music of Jigarthanda (2014 film)
- Jigarthanda DoubleX, the 2023 successor to the 2014 film
