= Erin Smith (musician) =

American guitarist (born 1972)

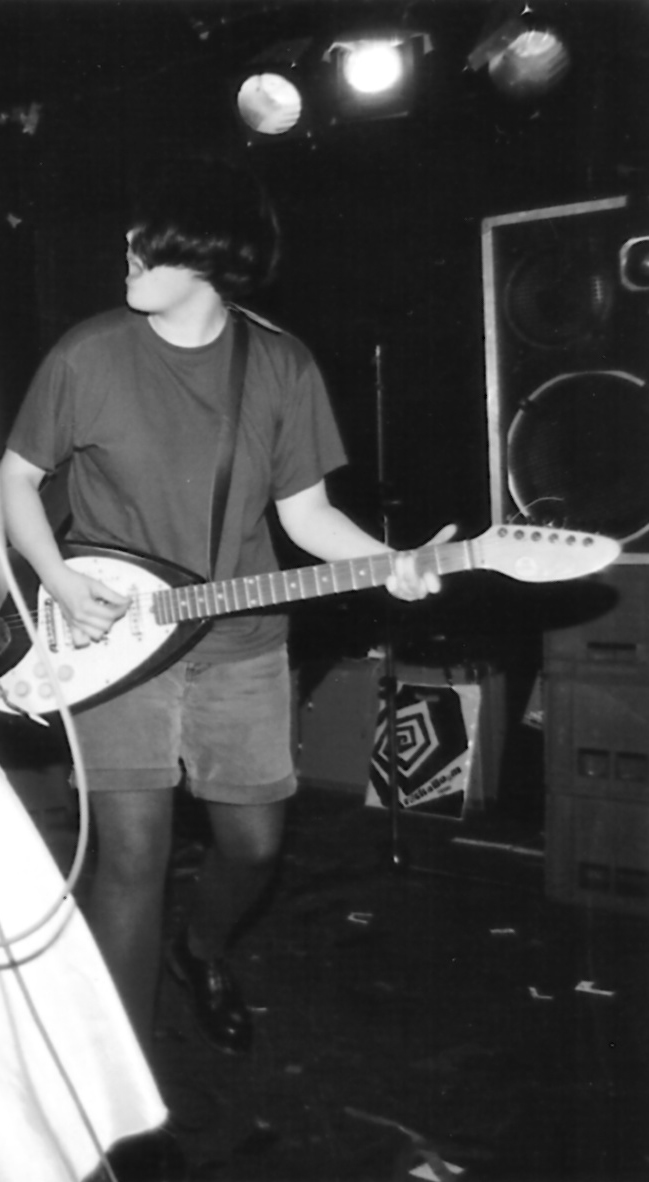
- Erin Smith with Bratmobile in 1994

Background information
- Born: August 16, 1972 (age 53); Washington, D.C. Line 12:
- Years active: 1990–present
- Labels: Kill Rock Stars, Lookout!
- Formerly of: Bratmobile; Cold Cold Hearts

Erin Smith (born August 16, 1972) is best known for being the guitarist of riot grrrl band Bratmobile, a band with drummer Molly Neuman and vocalist Allison Wolfe.

In 2023, Rolling Stone ranked her as one of the 250 greatest guitarists of all time. In 2025, The Washington Post referred to Smith as "one of the most distinctive guitarists D.C. punk will ever know."

== Early life ==
Smith started her zine Teenage Gang Debs in 1987 with her brother Don. In 1991, she started interning at Sassy magazine, where she wrote articles about independent music and exposed readers to DIY culture.

Her first guitar, a 1965 black teardrop KAPA Minstrel, was bought for $100 from Mike Schulman of Black Tambourine and Slumberland Records. Smith's brother was moving into Schulman's old room at a group house of students at the University of Maryland, and it had been left behind to sell.

== Career ==
Smith and Molly Neuman were introduced by Calvin Johnson at a Nation of Ulysses concert in Washington D.C. on December 26, 1990. They agreed to trade zines and kept in touch by letter and phone. When Neuman, along with Allison Wolfe, visited the city again for spring break in 1991, they asked Smith if she wanted to play music with them. They were initially joined by Jen Smith and Christina Billotte in a band they called Bratmobile DC, but Jen Smith and Billotte departed within months. Wolfe, Neuman, and Erin Smith continued on as Bratmobile, playing their first show as a trio at Fort Reno Park in July.

The band was active until 1994, when they went on hiatus. During this hiatus, Smith and Wolfe started a new band Cold Cold Hearts. Bratmobile reformed in 1999, but split again in 2003 after two more albums.

Her college major had been Radio, Television, and Film. In May 2000, Smith moved to California and started to work at Lookout! shortly after, doing radio promotion and reception. Then branching out to radio, video, and tour promotion, and later promoted to promotion director.

== With Bratmobile ==
=== Studio albums ===
- Pottymouth (1993) LP/CD/CS (Kill Rock Stars)
- Ladies, Women and Girls (2000) CD/LP, (Lookout! Records)
- Girls Get Busy (2002) CD/LP (Lookout! Records)

=== EPs ===
- The Real Janelle (1994) LPEP/CDEP (Kill Rock Stars)

=== Live albums ===
- The Peel Session CDEP (Strange Fruit)

=== Singles ===
- Kiss & Ride 7-inch (Homestead Records)

=== Split 7-inch ===
- Tiger Trap/ Bratmobile split 7-inch (4-Letter Words)
- Heavens to Betsy/ Bratmobile split 7-inch (K Records)
- Brainiac/ Bratmobile split 7-inch (12X12)
- Veronica Lake/ Bratmobile split 7-inch (Simple Machines)

=== Compilation albums ===
- Kill Rock Stars compilation, CD/LP, (Kill Rock Stars)
- A Wonderful Treat compilation cassette
- The Embassy Tapes cassette
- Throw compilation CD (Yoyo Recordings)
- International Pop Underground live LP/CD/CS (K Records)
- Neapolitan Metropolitan boxed 7-inch set (Simple Machines)
- Teen Beat 100 compilation 7-inch (Teen Beat)
- Julep compilation LP/CD (Yo Yo)
- Wakefield Vol. 2 V/A CD boxed set (Teen Beat)
- Plea For Peace Take Action compilation CD (Sub City)
- Boys Lie compilation CD (Lookout! Records)
- Yo Yo A Go Go 1999 compilation CD (Yoyo Recordings)
- Lookout! Freakout Episode 2 compilation CD (Lookout! Records)
- Songs For Cassavetes compilation CD (Better Looking Records)
- Lookout! Freakout Episode 3 CD (Lookout! Records)
- Turn-On Tune-In Lookout! DVD (Lookout! Records)

== With Cold Cold Hearts ==
=== Studio albums ===
- Cold Cold Hearts (1997)

=== Singles ===
- Yer So Sweet (Baby Donut) (1996)
