= Super Genius =

Super Genius may refer to:

- an imprint of Papercutz (publisher)
- Super Genius (album), by Circus Lupus, 1992
- Super Genius Games, a publisher of role-playing games

== See also ==
- Wile E. Coyote
