= Sex Stains =

American punk-rock band from Los Angeles

- Origin: Los Angeles, U.S.
- Genres: Punk rock
- Years active: 2014–2017
- Label: Don Giovanni
- Members: Allison Wolfe; Mecca Vazie Andrews; David Orlando; Sharif Dumani; Francisco "Pachy" Garcia

Sex Stains was an American punk rock band from Los Angeles formed in 2014 by Allison Wolfe, alongside David Orlando, Sharif Dumani, Francisco "Pachy" Garcia, and Mecca Vazie Andrews. Wolfe was a former member of Bratmobile and other bands; Orlando came from Warpaint and Garcia from Prettiest Eyes; Dumani had played with Cody Chesnutt and Alice Bag; and Andrews came with a background as a professional dancer and choreographer.

In 2016, the band released their debut album, eponymously titled Sex Stains. The album was recorded at Station House Studios in Echo Park, and produced by Mark Rains.

A music video for the song "Period. Period." was filmed in the bathroom of the longstanding Los Angeles punk venue The Smell. Wolfe said she had long been fascinated by the building's colorfully decorated facilities, "though I'm a little afraid to actually go to the bathroom there".

In a 2016 interview, Wolfe described the band as a more casual endeavor than her previous ones: "We’re not a younger band where we’re all just hanging around and trying to make it – we all have our lives already and we’re a little bit older and just kind of like, 'Yeah, we’ll do the band when we can'."

In December 2016, months after performing at Comet Ping Pong, the band was targeted by individuals who believed in the Pizzagate conspiracy theory; this was also due to the band allegedly featuring the "Boy Lover" symbol in their music video on YouTube. The band responded by closing the comments on their YouTube channel, writing in the description in one of their videos: "There was absolutely NO PLOT to purposefully use offensive symbols or to mess with peoples heads. There was/is ZERO interest in anything having to do with children. No one in the band had any knowledge of the triangle/spirals horrid symbolism. We're shocked & disgusted by the theory that we are somehow linked to Pedophelia rings or Satanic cults, and also by the hateful comments & accusations we've been receiving. WE ARE NOT pedophiles and do NOT support or promote it. Period. Again, we are just a punk rock band."

From summer 2017, Wolfe led a modified lineup of the band, dubbed Ex Stains. This outfit performed for approximately a year, disbanding in summer 2018.

== Discography ==
- Sex Stains (2016)
