= Jen Smith =

American musician

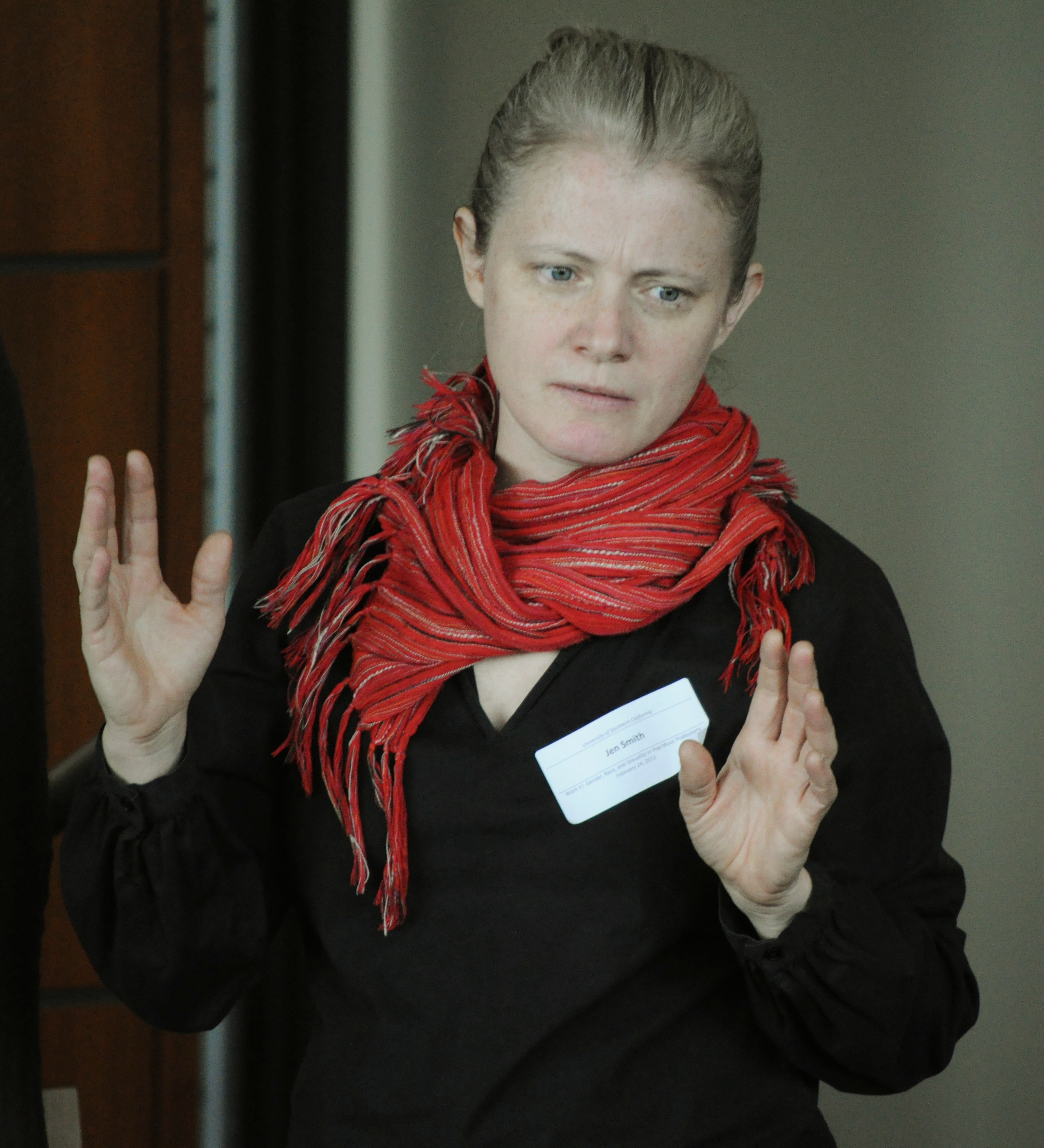
Jen Smith, 2011

Jen Smith is an artist, musician, zine editor, and activist from the United States. Smith is credited with being the inspiration behind the term riot grrrl and being one of the architects of the movement.

== Biography ==
In early 1991, Jen Smith and Washington, DC guitarist Christina Billotte of Autoclave joined Pacific Northwest band Bratmobile (Allison Wolfe and Molly Neuman) when they temporarily relocated to Washington, DC. The band released one cassette tape, called Bratmobile DC, with this line-up.

The Bratmobile girls were zine writers, and Wolfe and Neuman created Girl Germs to which Smith contributed. It was during this time in Washington, DC that Jen Smith came up with the idea of a "girl riot" and Molly Neuman conceived the riot grrrl mini-zine that gave the movement its name. Writing in Dance of Days: Two Decades of Punk in the Nation's Capital, Mark Andersen and Mark Jenkins report that while living in Washington, D.C., Smith reacted to the violence of the Mount Pleasant race riots in spring 1991 by prophetically writing in a letter to Wolfe, "this summer's going to be a girl riot." Other reports say she wrote, "we need to start a girl riot." As written about in Bikini Kill zine by Kathleen Hanna, Jen proposed they all collaborate on a zine called Girl Riot, which would serve as a networking forum for young women. Molly Neuman began the zine, released under the title riot grrrl, with contributions from Smith, Wolfe, and the members of Bikini Kill.

By the end of summer 1991, Erin Smith (no relation to Jen) from Bethesda, Maryland replaced Billotte on guitar and Bratmobile returned to Olympia, Washington, with Erin and Jen remaining in DC. Jen Smith stayed behind to edit a zine called Red Rover. A number of issues were released before she began a new zine in 1993, an offshoot of Red Rover, called Another Lo-Fi Xtravanganza. The zine also became a small record label.

At the same time, Jen Smith began a band with Donna Dresch and Nikki Chapman called Rastro! The trio, with Smith on guitar and vocals, Chapman on bass, and Dresch on drums, released two songs on compilations by independent record labels such as Simple Machines. After this band broke up, Smith moved to Olympia, Washington where she recorded Boot Party with Dub Narcotic Sound System, and began the Cha Cha Cabaret, which she hosted under the persona of "Miss Lady Hand Grenade" in 1996 and 1997. Participating artists included Miranda July, Mirah, Flying Tigers, Old Time Relijun, Simplement Jacques, Nikki McClure, The Lookers, The Skirts, and Panties, and all appear together on the K Records compilation Chez Vous. Cha Cha Cabaret toured the Pacific Northwest, adding musicians such as Sharon Cheslow while in San Francisco.

In the 2000s, Smith returned to San Francisco, where she joined with ex-Circus Lupus member Seth Lorinczi and ex-Electrolettes member Julianna Bright to begin the band The Quails. The band toured with Sleater Kinney, Aislers Set and The No-No's. They released three CDs, as well as zines and projects such as the comic book Bon Soir and a mini-opera CD under the name 'Marzipan Ponce'. The band broke up, Jen Smith devoted herself to her artwork.

In 2008, she appeared in the feature film The Lollipop Generation by G.B. Jones

== Discography ==
=== with Bratmobile ===
- Bratmobile DC (self released cassette tape, 1991)

=== with Rastro! ===
- "Some Things", on Go In The Dark (Mira Records 7", 1992)
- "Kiss Me", on Simple Machines Working Holiday: June (Simple Machines 7", 1993)
- "Kiss Me", on Working Holiday! (Simple Machines CD compilation, 1994)

=== with Dub Narcotic Sound System ===
- Boot Party (K Records, 1995)

=== with Cha Cha Cabaret ===
- Chez Vous (K Records, 1997)

=== with The Quails ===
- "Memo From the Desk of The Quails", on Fields And Streams (Kill Rock Stars compilation CD, 2001)
- We Are The Quails (Inconvenient Records, 2001)
- Atmosphere (Inconvenient Records, 2002)
- The Song Is Love (Mr. Lady Records, 2003)

=== Compilations ===
- "Inkling", on Selector Dub Narcotic (K Records)

== Bibliography ==
- Bon Soir, Jen Smith, Julianna Bright, Seth Lorinczi, ed. 2002
- Quail Hunt, Jen Smith, ed. 2000s
- Another Lo-Fi Xtravanganza, Jen Smith, ed. 1993
- Red Rover, Jen Smith, ed. 1990s
- riot grrrl, Molly Neuman, ed. 1990
- Girl Germs, Molly Neuman and Allison Wolfe, ed, 1990s

== Film ==
- The Lollipop Generation by G.B. Jones, 2008
