= Pottymouth =

Studio album by Bratmobile
- Released: June 8, 1993
- Recorded: August 1991 – July 1992
- Genres: Punk rock; riot grrrl; lo-fi
- Length: 27:47
- Label: Kill Rock Stars

Bratmobile chronology
Pottymouth (1993)	The Real Janelle (1994)

Pottymouth is the debut studio album by American punk rock band Bratmobile, released on June 8, 1993, by Kill Rock Stars.

== Recording and release ==
Most of the album was recorded by Tim Green of Nation of Ulysses in July 1992, at the Embassy in Washington, DC. Green was paid with a slice of cheese pizza and a bottle of black hair dye. "Kiss & Ride", "No You Don't", and "Queenie" were recorded in August 1991 at Egg Studios in Seattle, Washington by Conrad Uno, and at YoYo Studios in Olympia, Washington by Pat Maley. Molly Neuman sings on "Richard", which was recorded in December 1992 at the Red House in Olympia, Washington by Tim Green. The album was released on June 8, 1993, by the independent record label Kill Rock Stars.

== Critical reception ==
Professional ratings
Review scores
Source	Rating
AllMusic	3/5 stars
Christgau's Consumer Guide	(3-star Honorable Mention)
NME	7/10
The Rolling Stone Album Guide	3.5/5 stars
Spin Alternative Record Guide	8/10

AllMusic reviewer Stewart Mason felt that Pottymouth "is about the early-'90s indie scene, about the D.I.Y. life in the post-Nirvana age where it seemed like anything could happen." Ira Robbins wrote approvingly in Trouser Press: "Mustering 17 songs (including a relatively protracted bash at the Runaways' seminal "Cherry Bomb") in under a half-hour, the album is like a slap in the face: it's over before you realize what you're feeling but its sting lasts a good long while." Prominent music critic Robert Christgau of The Village Voice praised the songs "Throwaway" and "No You Don't". In January 1994, Spin placed Pottymouth in its list of 10 Best Albums of the Year You Didn't Hear.

Retrospective reviews have described Pottymouth as a classic riot grrrl album. NME said that the album "helped to refine what riot grrrl was all about—namely, shunning academia and adopting a do-it-yourself attitude." In 2012, it was ranked at number 90 on Fact's list of "The 100 Best Albums of the 1990s", and at number 149 on Pitchfork's list of "The 150 Best Albums of the 1990s" in 2022. In 2026 Rolling Stone placed it at 36 on their list of The 100 Greatest Punk Albums of All Time.

== Track listing ==
1. "Love Thing" – 1:40
2. "Stab" – 1:50
3. "Cherry Bomb" (The Runaways cover) – 1:51
4. "Throwaway" – 2:13
5. "P.R.D.C.T." – 1:53
6. "Some Special" – 1:40
7. "Fuck Yr Fans" – 1:19
8. "Polaroid Baby" 0:54
9. "Panik" – 1:43
10. "Bitch Theme" – 1:31
11. "Richard" – 1:58
12. "Cool Schmool" – 2:03
13. "Juswanna" – 1:34
14. "I Love You, You Little Crocodile" (hidden track) – 0:59
15. "Kiss & Ride" – 1:27
16. "No You Don't" – 1:45
17. "Queenie" – 1:19

== Personnel ==
Bratmobile

- Allison Wolfe – Singer/Songwriter
- Erin Smith – Guitar, Back-up Vocals, Photography
- Molly Neuman – Drums, Photography

Technical personnel

- Patrick Maley – Engineer
- Tim Green – Engineer
- Conrad Uno – Engineer
- Ellen Smith – Photography
- Tracy Sawyer – Photography
- Panacea Theriac – Photography
