= The Peel Session (Bratmobile EP) =

EP by Bratmobile
- Released: January 1, 1994
- Recorded: July 1993
- Genre: Indie
- Length: 8:32
- Label: Strange Fruit (US), Dutch East (International)

Bratmobile chronology
The Real Janelle (1994)	''The Peel Session'' (1994)	Ladies, Women and Girls (2000)

Professional ratings
Review scores
Source	Rating
ARTISTdirect	3/5 stars
The Rolling Stone Album Guide	3/5 stars

Bratmobile had a BBC live broadcast with John Peel in July 1993 and was issued the following year as The Peel Session CD EP.

== Track listing ==
1. "There's No Other Way/No You Don't" – 2:23
2. "Bitch Theme" – 1:45
3. "Make Me Miss America" – 2:41
4. "Panik" – 1:43

== Album credits ==
Bratmobile

- Molly Neuman – Drums, background vocals
- Erin Smith – Guitar
- Allison Wolfe – Vocals,

Additional credits

- Adam Askew – Engineer,
- Pat Graham – Photography,
- Paul Long – Producer
