= Circus Lupus =

American post-hardcore band

- Origin: Madison, Wisconsin, U.S.
- Genres: Post-hardcore; art punk
- Years active: 1990–1993
- Label: Dischord
- Past members: Arika Casebolt; Chris Hamley; Chris Thomson; Reg Shrader; Seth Lorinczi
- Website: Dischord website

Circus Lupus was a post-hardcore band based in the area of Washington, D.C. The band originally formed in Madison, Wisconsin, where one-time Ignition and Soul Side bassist Chris Thomson met guitarist Chris Hamley and drummer Arika Casebolt while attending school. The name "Circus Lupus" comes from an SCTV sketch about "Circus Lupus, the Circus of Wolves", a mock TV commercial for an entirely wolf-filled traveling circus, with graphics of wolves on trapeze swings and other circus apparatus. Reg Shrader initially played bass with the band. He was replaced by Seth Lorinczi, as the band was making its transition from Madison to Washington.

The band released two full-length albums and a seven-inch single on Dischord Records. The Super Genius LP (DIS63) was released in 1992, followed by the "Pop Man" with B-side "Pressure Point" single (DIS73; produced by Joan Jett) and Solid Brass LP (DIS79) in 1993. The band has also released material on the Cubist Production record label. Members of the band have participated in other projects, including work released on Chicago-based label Southern Records. One of these follow-up bands was Antimony, featuring Arika Casebolt on drums, Seth Lorinczi on bass, and Chris Hamley on guitar and vocals. They released a full-length album in 1995 on Double Deuce Records out of New York City. Chris Thomson and Chris Hamley later reunited to form the Dischord and Simple Machines Records band Monorchid. Seth Lorinczi moved to San Francisco in the 2000s, creating the band The Quails with Jen Smith and Julianna Bright and releasing three CDs.

== Members ==
- Chris Thomson: vocals (1990–1993)
- Arika Casebolt: drums (1990–1993)
- Chris Hamley: guitar (1990–1993)
- Seth Lorinczi: bass (1991–1993)
- Reg Shrader: bass (1990–1991)

== Discography ==
- Super Genius (1992)
- Solid Brass (1993)

Singles

- Tightrope Walker / Chinese Nitro 7-inch (1990, Cubist)
- Sea Of Serenity / Heathen split 7-inch w/Trenchmouth (1992, Skene!, Dischord)
- Circus Lupus 7-inch (1992, Dischord)

== See also ==
- Math rock
