= Coldheart =

Coldheart may refer to:

- Coldheart (novel), a 2000 Doctor Who novel
- Coldheart (comics), a fictional enemy of Spider-Man
- Mia Coldheart, lead singer in Crucified Barbara
- Professor Coldheart, a fictional villain in the Care Bears franchise

== See also ==
- Cold Heart (disambiguation)
