= The Quails (American band) =

American punk band

- Origin: San Francisco, California, United States
- Genres: Punk rock
- Years active: 1999-?
- Members: Seth Lorinczi; Julianna Bright; Jen Smith

The Quails were an American punk band from San Francisco, California. The band was formed in 1999 by Seth Lorinczi, formerly of Circus Lupus, Jen Smith (credited as the inspiration behind the term riot grrrl) and Julianna Bright. They released three albums, the second of which, Atmosphere (2002), was praised for its "strangeness" and "artistic value" by Kerry L. Smith in Rolling Stone magazine. The band toured with artists like Sleater Kinney, Tracy and the Plastics, Hella and Aislers Set. Their most performed venue was San Francisco's legendary Eagle Tavern, where they were affectionately dubbed the house band.

After the band broke up, Lorinczi and Bright formed The Golden Bears, whose debut Wall To Wall is to be released on Amore!Phonics.

== Line up ==
- Seth Lorinczi - bass
- Julianna Bright - drums, vocals
- Jen Smith - guitar, vocals

== Discography ==
- We Are the Quails (Inconvenient Press & Recordings, 2001)
- Atmosphere (Inconvenient, 2002)
- The Song Is Love (Mr. Lady Records, 2003)
