= Partyline =

American punk rock band

- Origin: Washington, D.C., U.S.
- Genres: Riot grrrl • pop punk • punk rock
- Years active: 2004–present
- Labels: Retard Disco
- Members: Allison Wolfe; Angela Melkisethian; Crystal Bradley; Gene Vincent Melkisethian
- Website: www.retarddisco.com

Partyline is an American, Washington, D.C.–based punk rock band, consisting of singer/songwriter Allison Wolfe (Bratmobile, Cold Cold Hearts, Dig Yr. Grave, Deep Lust, Hawnay Troof), guitarist Angela Melkisethian (The Hell Mutts, Hott Beat, The Savage Boys and Girls Club, Troll Tax), drummer Crystal Bradley, and touring drummer Gene Vincent Melkisethian (The Hell Mutts, The Savage Boys and Girls Club, No Justice). Formed in 2004, Partyline toured the Northeast in January 2005 and covered the rest of the coast throughout March.

Their debut EP, Girls With Glasses, was released June 2005 and distributed by Retard Disco. The band toured the U.S. a number of times the same year, followed by a trip to Germany and the Netherlands for their first international shows. They then spent the end of October and every day in November touring more of Europe, finishing the year off with a hometown gig in Washington, D.C.

The band spent most of the first half of 2006 writing songs for their debut full-length album, Zombie Terrorist, which they began recording at the end of May and was released on October 24, 2006. Chris Richards, of Q and Not U fame, helped with production. The album was described as "an unapologetic, combative riot grrrl-fuelled attack" that "deals heavily with the band’s dissatisfaction with neo-conservatism and the state of U.S. politics."

In late November and early December 2006, Partyline toured Australia and New Zealand; they toured Europe for the third time in April 2007, and again in April 2008. The band has been on hiatus since 2010.

== Discography ==
=== Albums ===
- Zombie Terrorist (Retard Disco, 2006)

=== Singles and EPs ===
- Girls With Glasses CDr (2004) five-song demo
- Girls With Glasses CD Maxi-Single (Retard Disco, 2005)
- Partyline/Spider And The Web split 7-inch (Local Kid, 2005) – "Who Knows, Who Cares?", "Ladies Room"
- "Bad For The Baby" b/w "Like I Care", "Stealing From Children" 7-inch single (Moonflower, 2009)

=== Compilation appearances ===
- Southern Autumnal Killer Megamix (Southern, 2005) – "Nuthaus"
- We Got Actions (Southern, 2006) – "Trophy Wifey"
- Lady Fingers (A Ladyfest 2006 Compilation) (Valve, 2006) – "Trophy Wifey"
- Ladyfest Wellington Sampler CDr (2006) – "Trophy Wifey", "Cicada Summer", "Unsafe At Any Speed"
