= Cold Hearted (disambiguation) =

"Cold Hearted" is a 1989 Paula Abdul song.

Cold Hearted may also refer to:

- "Cold Hearted" (Seven Lions and Kill the Noise song), 2017
- "Cold Hearted", a 2014 song by Jack & Jack
- "Cold Hearted", a 2022 song by Jay Chou from Greatest Works of Art

== See also ==
- Cold Heart (disambiguation)
