= Girls with Glasses =

Girls With Glasses

EP by Partyline
- Released: June 14, 2005
- Genre: Punk rock, Indie
- Length: 13:03
- Label: Retard Disco
- Producer: Chad Clark

Partyline chronology
Girls With Glasses (2005)	Zombie Terrorist (2006)

Professional ratings
Review scores
Source	Rating
The Stranger	link

Girls With Glasses is the debut EP by Washington, D.C.–based punk band Partyline. It was released in June, 2005, by Retard Disco.

== Track listing ==
1. "Unsafe At Any Speed"
2. "Girls With Glasses"
3. "Nuthaus"
4. "No Romantic"
5. "Cicada Summer"
6. "Girls Like Me" (Nikki & the Corvettes cover)

== Personnel ==
Partyline

- Crystal Bradley, drums
- Angela Melkisethian, guitar
- Allison Wolfe, vocals

== Production ==
Girls With Glasses was produced by Chad Clark, with engineering by Vice Cooler. The EP displays a classic punk rock sound, "Ramonesian in structure and delivery."
