= Bratmobile =

American punk band

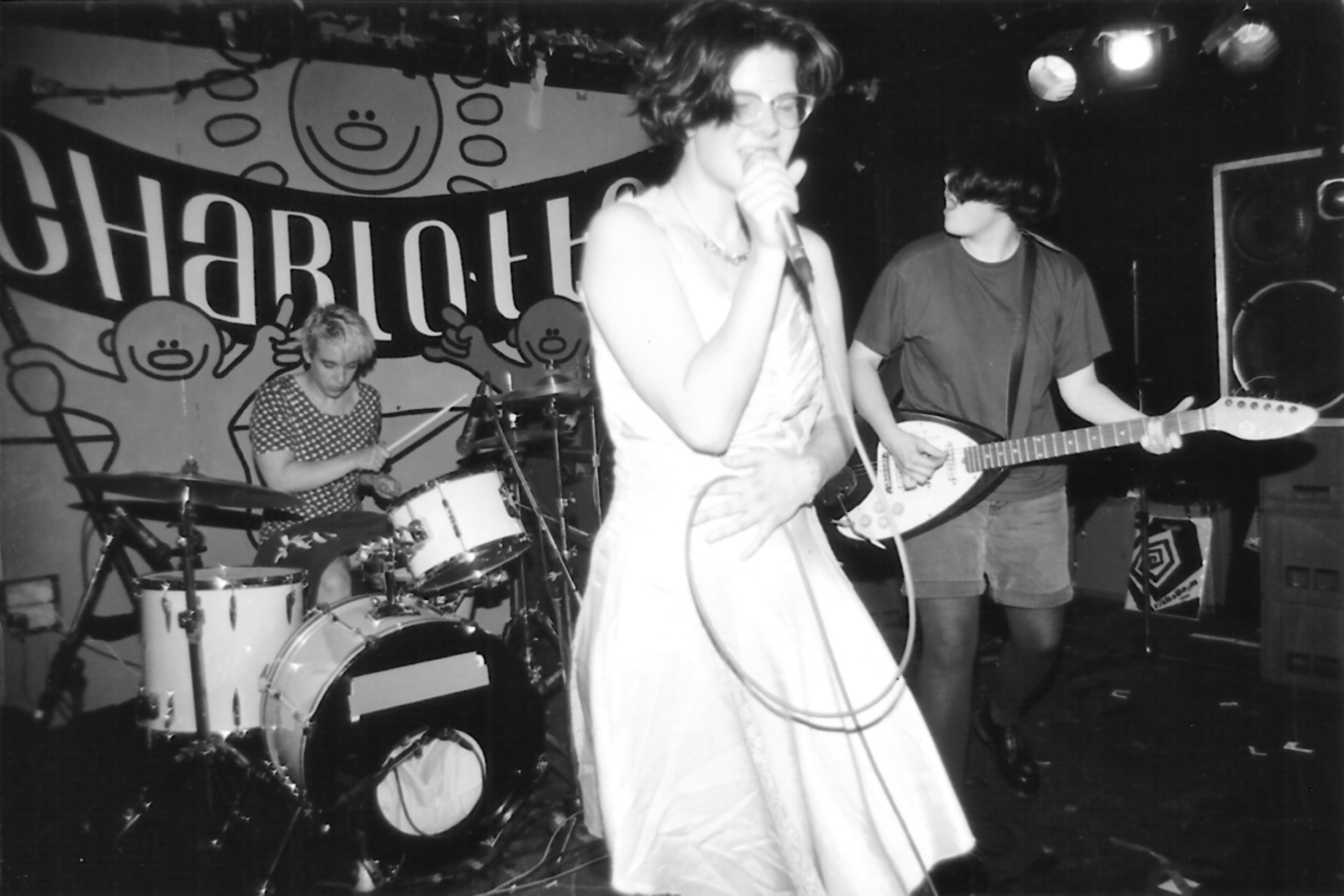
- Bratmobile in 1994

Background information
- Origin: Olympia, Washington, U.S.
- Genres: Punk rock; indie rock; riot grrrl
- Years active: 1991–1994; 1998–2003; 2019; 2023–present
- Labels: Kill Rock Stars; Lookout!
- Members: Allison Wolfe; Molly Neuman; Erin Smith
- Past members: Michelle Noel; Jen Smith; Christina Billotte
- Website: killrockstars.com/.../bratmobile

Bratmobile is an American punk band from Olympia, Washington, formed in 1991 and known for being one of the first-generation "riot grrrl" bands. The band was influenced by several eclectic musical styles, including elements of pop, surf, and garage rock.

== Beginnings ==
Allison Wolfe (from Olympia, Washington) and Molly Neuman (from Washington, D.C.) met during fall 1989 while living next door to each other in dorms at the University of Oregon in Eugene, Oregon. The two had been raised in activist families: Wolfe had been raised by a lesbian activist mother, and Neuman's father worked for the Democratic National Committee and had introduced his daughter to leaders of the Congressional Black Caucus (CBC). Their shared musical influences included punk, hip-hop, and the Olympia band Beat Happening. Neuman was influenced by the writings of Eldridge Cleaver. Together, Neuman and Wolfe took classes in women's studies and music, traveled to Olympia on the weekends, and started collaborating on influential feminist fanzine Girl Germs in 1990.

== History ==
=== 1990–1991: Origins ===
Neuman's and Wolfe's friend Calvin Johnson, an indie musician in the Olympia scene in The Go Team and Beat Happening who also co-owned K Records, asked them to play a show in Olympia on Valentine's Day in 1991 with Bikini Kill and Some Velvet Sidewalk. At first, Wolfe admitted that they were "a fake band" because they did not play instruments, but they had written some songs which they performed a cappella. After an attempt to get out of the gig, they agreed and sought the help of Some Velvet Sidewalk member Robert Christie. Christie let Bratmobile borrow rehearsal space and equipment and advised them to listen to the Ramones for inspiration. In response to that advice, Wolfe said, "Something in me clicked. Like, okay, if most boy punk rock bands just listen to the Ramones and that's how they write their songs, then we'll do the opposite and I won't listen to any Ramones and that way we'll sound different." With five original songs, the band played its first show as a two-woman act at Olympia's North Shore Surf Club on February 14, 1991, with Neuman and Wolfe sharing duties on guitar, drums, and vocals. They recorded the next day for the first Kill Rock Stars compilation, which was released later that year. Briefly, they were joined by a bass player Michelle Noel. They played only a couple shows with this line-up, including one with The Melvins and Beat Happening, also at the Surf Club on May 16, 1991.

Initially, Wolfe and Neuman thought of Bratmobile as a loose organization that would have different branches in different cities. During spring break 1991, Neuman and Wolfe went to Washington, D.C., to work on this new form of Bratmobile that, at that time, included different musicians Erin Smith on guitar, Christina Billotte of Autoclave on drums and bass, and artist Jen Smith (no relation to Erin). Johnson had previously introduced Neuman to nascent guitarist Erin Smith from Bethesda, Maryland, during the Christmas holiday in December, 1990 at a Nation of Ulysses show in D.C. Erin Smith was co-author, with her brother, of the much-revered TV pop culture fanzine Teenage Gang Debs when Neuman and Wolfe asked her to jam with them. They rehearsed at the Embassy, a group house in D.C. that served as headquarters for the Nation of Ulysses. When Beat Happening, Nation of Ulysses, and Autoclave toured the east coast that spring, Bratmobile DC had its first performance at Maxwell's in Hoboken, New Jersey. The newly minted Bratmobile DC lineup of Neuman, Wolfe, Erin Smith, and Billotte spontaneously got on stage. Back in D.C., they recorded with Tim Green of Nation of Ulysses in the Embassy's basement studio. Around this time, Jen Smith, who lived at the Embassy, recorded with Bratmobile DC and played a show with them.

This lineup with Billotte and Jen Smith released a cassette tape entitled Bratmobile DC. Thereafter, Bratmobile became a trio with Wolfe, Neuman, and Erin Smith.

=== 1991–1994: Pottymouth and breakup ===
Bikini Kill toured with Nation of Ulysses in May & June 1991, converging in D.C. with Bratmobile that summer. In July 1991, Bratmobile played their first show as a 3-piece with Neuman on drums, Wolfe on vocals, and Erin Smith on guitar. Bratmobile were just in time to play at the historic International Pop Underground Convention in Olympia in August 1991, becoming the only band to appear twice. They played the opening show "Girl Night". They also played a show at Capitol Lake Park on a bill with Melvins, Mecca Normal, Girl Trouble, Beat Happening, and Fugazi. During the summer of 1992, Bratmobile toured with Heavens to Betsy. Bratmobile released the album Pottymouth (1993) and The Real Janelle EP (1994) on Kill Rock Stars, as well as The Peel Session.

On May 7, 1994, under the backdrop of intense media scrutiny and inner pressures within the Riot Grrrl movement, Bratmobile broke up onstage at the Thread Waxing Space in New York City. With the members of Bratmobile already stressed from a lack of practice and having to perform in front of several high-profile individuals, several women in the audience stole the band's microphone to accuse a male audience member of assault whilst also criticizing Bratmobile's failure to provide a safe space, thereby "[stopping] the show for a span of time at least as long as [the band] eventually played", according to Spin journalist Ann Powers. Wolfe said: "All of a sudden not only was I supposed to serve as talent that night, I was also supposed to serve as club manager and security! [...] everybody was screaming at each other. It was like slapstick comedy or some kind of crazy performance art, and we just broke up".

=== 1994–1999: Hiatus ===
After the break-up, Molly Neuman moved to the San Francisco Bay Area and began working at East Bay punk record label Lookout! Records. She also played in The PeeChees and The Frumpies. Allison Wolfe moved to Washington, D.C., and she and Maryland-based Erin Smith started a new band together called Cold Cold Hearts. Wolfe has also been active in feminism and activism.

=== 1999–2003: Reformation and second breakup ===
In 1999, the band decided to reunite for a low-key show in Oakland's Stork Club and the band was relaunched to go on tour with Sleater-Kinney.

In 2000, Bratmobile released their second full-length studio album, Ladies, Women and Girls. The album was well-received by critics and earned Bratmobile new fans as they toured with Sleater-Kinney, The Donnas, The Locust, among others. Ladies, Women and Girls was released on Neuman's Lookout! Records and produced by Tim Green of Nation of Ulysses and The Fucking Champs. Jon Nikki (Prima Donnas, Gene Defcon, Mocket, Sarah Dougher, Sir, Puce Moment) added guitar, bass and keyboard parts to the minimal Brat sound.

On May 7, 2002, Bratmobile released their third album, Girls Get Busy. On Girls Get Busy, Audrey Marrs, (Mocket, Gene Defcon) added keyboards that gave the album its distinctive new sound. Marty Violence (Young Pioneers) also contributed bass.

After dedicating most of 2002 and 2003 to promoting Girls Get Busy via touring, each of the principal members went back to do other things. While the band didn't formally break up, Allison Wolfe did post a message on January 30, 2004, in the Bratmobile message board concerning the status of the band:

Yeah, sorry to say i think Bratmobile is through. We never had a certain incident where anyone said "I quit" or whatever, so it's been vague and drawn out. Sorry if that's been confusing to people. I think all 3 of us just have different ways of doing things and different things we want to do now, in and outside of music. Molly has just been so busy with managing the Donnas and the Locust, and as co-owner of Lookout! Records. Erin is also working full time at Lookout! Records. I've been living across the country in Washington DC, working 2 part-time jobs, and now doing other musical things. I'm now in Hawnay Troof, Baby Truth, and also a new girl band in DC called Partyline.

In 2018, Kill Rock Stars produced a podcast series about Bratmobile titled Girl Germs.

=== 2019–present: Reunions ===
In 2019, Bratmobile's original lineup reunited to perform at Tobi Vail's birthday party. In 2023, Wolfe and Neuman reformed Bratmobile again to perform at the Mosswood Meltdown festival in Oakland, California, where they were joined by Tiger Trap’s Rose Melberg on guitar, Marrs on keyboards, and Marty Key on bass. Smith was unable to join the band for this reunion due to "other commitments".

== Discography ==
=== Studio albums ===
- Pottymouth (1993) LP/CD/CS (Kill Rock Stars)
- Ladies, Women and Girls (2000) CD/LP, (Lookout! Records) - US CMJ #22
- Girls Get Busy (2002) CD/LP (Lookout! Records) - US CMJ #17

=== EPs ===
- The Real Janelle (1994) LPEP/CDEP (Kill Rock Stars) - US CMJ #83

=== Live albums ===
- The Peel Session CDEP (Strange Fruit)

=== Singles ===
- Kiss & Ride 7-inch (1992) (Homestead Records)

=== Split 7-inch ===
- Tiger Trap/ Bratmobile split 7-inch (4-Letter Words)
- Heavens to Betsy/ Bratmobile split 7-inch (K Records)
- Brainiac/ Bratmobile split 7-inch (12X12)
- Veronica Lake/ Bratmobile split 7-inch (Simple Machines)

=== Compilation appearances ===
- Kill Rock Stars compilation, CD/LP, (Kill Rock Stars)
- A Wonderful Treat compilation cassette
- The Embassy Tapes cassette
- Throw compilation CD (Yoyo Recordings)
- International Pop Underground live LP/CD/CS (K Records)
- Neapolitan Metropolitan boxed 7-inch set (Simple Machines)
- Teen Beat 100 compilation 7-inch (Teen Beat)
- Julep compilation LP/CD (Yo Yo)
- Wakefield Vol. 2 V/A CD boxed set (Teen Beat)
- Plea For Peace Take Action compilation CD (Sub City)
- Boys Lie compilation CD (Lookout! Records)
- Yo Yo A Go Go 1999 compilation CD (Yoyo Recordings)
- Lookout! Freakout Episode 2 compilation CD (Lookout! Records)
- Songs For Cassavetes compilation CD (Better Looking Records)
- Lookout! Freakout Episode 3 CD (Lookout! Records)
- Turn-On Tune-In Lookout! DVD (Lookout! Records)
