= Solid Brass =

Studio album by Circus Lupus
- Released: 1993
- Genre: Post-hardcore
- Label: Dischord
- Producer: Don Zientara

Circus Lupus chronology
Super Genius (1992)	Solid Brass (1993)

Solid Brass is the second and final studio album by the band Circus Lupus. It was released by Dischord Records in 1993.

== Critical reception ==
The Washington Post said, "From the ambulance-siren guitar of the opening 'Right Turn Clyde' to the fractured blues licks of 'Texas Minute' to the triumphant drum intro to 'Pop Man', these songs are angular yet swirling, direct yet intricate."

== Track listing ==
1. "Right Turn Clyde"
2. "7 x 4 x 1"
3. "I Always Thought You Were an Asshole"
4. "And You Won"
5. "New Cop Car"
6. "Texas Minute"
7. "Deviant Gesture Catalog"
8. "Takes About an Hour: Epilepsy"
9. "Pop Man"
10. "Heathen"
11. "Pop Man"
12. "Pressure Point"
