= Allison Wolfe =

American singer-songwriter (born 1969)

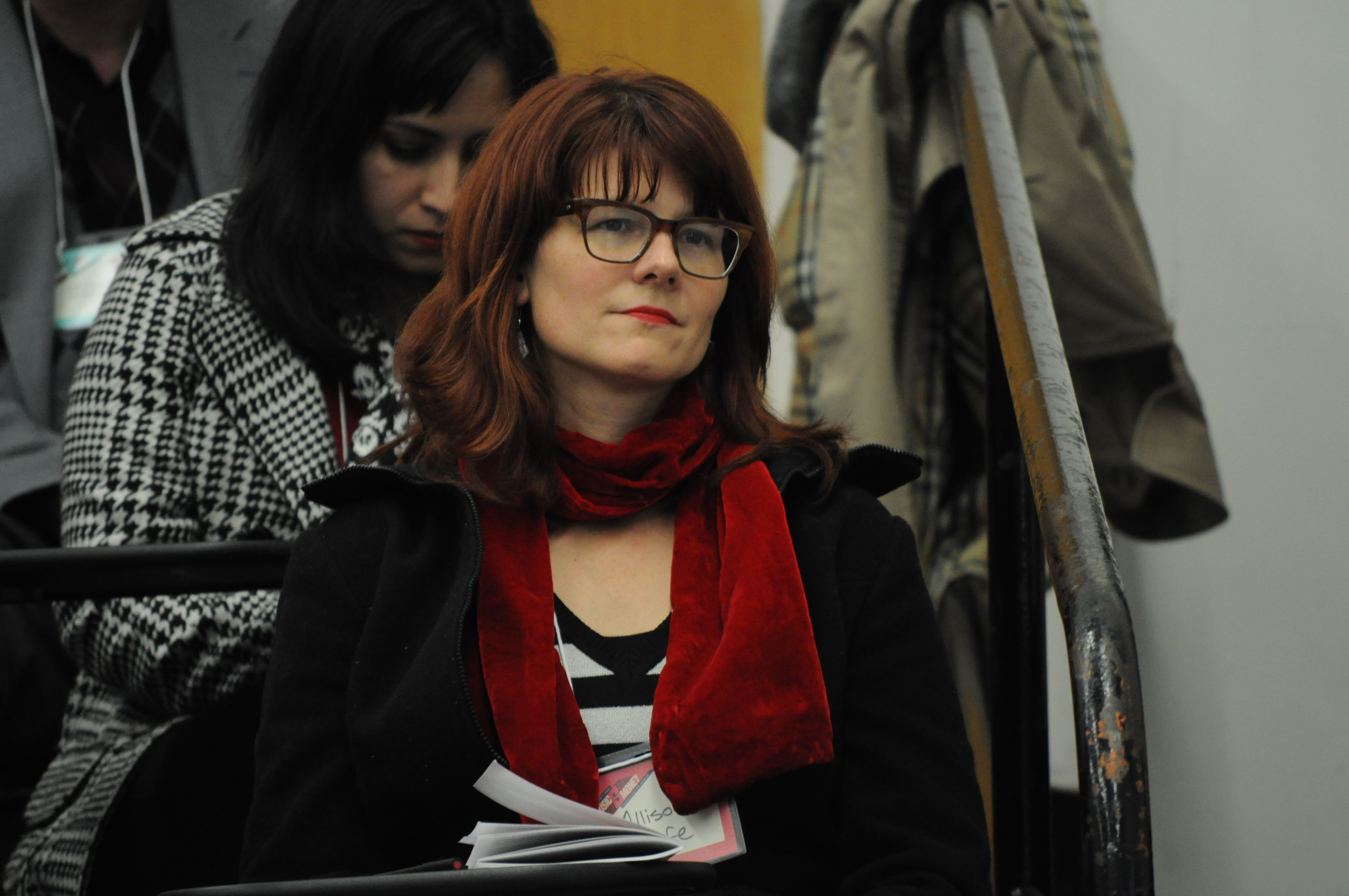
- Wolfe attending the EMP Pop Conference in Los Angeles, 2011.

Background information
- Also known as: Baby Donut
- Born: November 9, 1969 (age 56); Memphis, Tennessee, U.S.
- Genre: Punk rock • indie rock • riot grrrl
- Occupation: Singer • songwriter
- Instrument: Vocals
- Years active: 1991–present
- Labels: Kill Rock Stars; Lookout! Records; Retard Disco; Don Giovanni Records
- Formerly of: Bratmobile; Cold Cold Hearts; Hawnay Troof; Partyline; Sex Stains
- Website: allisoncwolfe.com

Allison Wolfe (born November 9, 1969) is a Los Angeles–based singer, songwriter, writer, and podcaster. As a founding member and lead singer of the punk rock band Bratmobile, she became one of the leading voices of the riot grrl movement.

Wolfe has also fronted other bands, including Sex Stains, Partyline, and Cold Cold Hearts. She was one of the principal creators of the original Ladyfest music festival in 2000. She has more recently been the creator and host of the punk rock interview podcast I'm In The Band.

== Background ==
Allison Wolfe and her sister Cindy were born identical twins in Memphis, Tennessee, on November 9, 1969. Together with their sister Molly, they grew up in Olympia, Washington. Their parents divorced when they were all still young children, and they were raised by their mother, Pat Shively. A radical feminist and self-described lesbian, Shively founded Olympia's Eastside Women's Health Clinic in 1981. It was the first women's clinic in Thurston County, and throughout Shively's two decades of work it was the target of relentless anti-abortion demonstrations. The protests could be harrowing: Wolfe's mother endured verbal and physical abuse, and death threats forced her to go to the clinic armed and wearing a bulletproof vest. (The EWHC was razed in a fire in 2005, set by a still-unidentified arsonist.) Pat Shively died of ovarian cancer in February, 2000, and Wolfe credits her as being a lifelong influence, a feminist role model "almost too big to live up to."

In 1988, Wolfe spent time as an exchange student in Thailand's Krathum Baen District. She returned to attend Evergreen State College in Olympia, and later the University of Oregon at Eugene.

== Music career ==
=== Bratmobile ===
Wolfe and Molly Neuman wrote about rock music's pervasive sexism in their influential punkzines, Girl Germs and Riot Grrrl. They took those themes to music when they joined with Washington, DC guitarist Erin Smith to form their own band, Bratmobile, in 1991. Bratmobile performed at the International Pop Underground Convention in Olympia, Washington in August 1991. Maura Johnston later wrote in Rolling Stone that Wolfe's distinctive "disaffected drawl" became "one of the most prominent voices of the early-Nineties riot grrrl movement".

Bratmobile recorded for Kill Rock Stars, an Olympia-based independent label, and released their first full-length album, Pottymouth, in 1992. The band ended in a rancorous onstage breakup in New York City in 1994.

=== Cold Cold Hearts ===
Wolfe and Smith eventually reunited to form Cold Cold Hearts with an expanded rhythm section provided by drummer Katherine Brown and bassist Natalie Mencinsky ("Nattles"). The band toured extensively and released one self-titled album in 1997.

=== Deep Lust ===
Wolfe later sang with Deep Lust, her first band with male musicians which she lightheartedly describes as "my boy band". Deep Lust formed in early 1999; they toured and released one self-titled album on Kill Rock Stars in February 2000.

=== Bratmobile reunion ===
Bratmobile reformed in 1999 and went on tour with Sleater Kinney. The reunited band released two more albums, Ladies, Women and Girls (2000) and Girls Get Busy (2002).

=== Partyline ===
Wolfe started a Washington D.C.–based band, Partyline, in 2004. The band released two full-length albums, Girls With Glasses (2005) and Zombie Terrorist (2006).

=== Sex Stains ===
Sex Stains formed in Los Angeles in 2014. The five-person group was the largest outfit Wolfe had worked with yet, and the first in which she had a companion vocalist, Mecca Vazie Andrews. The band released their eponymous debut album on Don Giovanni Records in 2016.

After some personnel changes in 2017, the group was recast as Ex Stains, which performed shows with Wolfe on lead vocals until disbanding in mid-2018.

=== Other musical groups ===
Wolfe has also performed and recorded with various other bands including Alice Bag, Cool Moms, Dig Yr Grave, Hawnay Troof and its offshoot, Baby Truth.

== Other works ==
Wolfe was one of the primary architects behind the original Ladyfest music festival in Olympia, Washington, in 2000. In later years, Ladyfest festivals have taken place throughout the world and Wolfe has appeared at many of them.

Wolfe holds a master's degree in arts journalism from the University of Southern California. In the 2000s she worked for The Washington Post, and edited the punk rock-themed manga series Nana, refashioning its basic English translation into modern vernacular. Since 2017 she has hosted I'm In The Band, a podcast on Tidal in which she interviews artists from the punk and indie rock scenes.

== With Bratmobile ==
=== Studio albums ===
- Pottymouth (1993) LP/CD/CS (Kill Rock Stars)
- Ladies, Women and Girls (2000) CD/LP, (Lookout! Records)
- Girls Get Busy (2002) CD/LP (Lookout! Records)

=== EPs ===
- The Real Janelle (1994) LPEP/CDEP (Kill Rock Stars)

=== Live albums ===
- The Peel Session CDEP (Strange Fruit)

=== Singles ===
- Kiss & Ride 7-inch (Homestead Records)

=== Split 7-inch ===
- Tiger Trap/ Bratmobile split 7-inch (4-Letter Words)
- Heavens to Betsy/ Bratmobile split 7-inch (K Records)
- Brainiac/ Bratmobile split 7-inch (12X12)
- Veronica Lake/ Bratmobile split 7-inch (Simple Machines)

=== Compilation appearances ===
- Kill Rock Stars compilation, CD/LP, (Kill Rock Stars)
- A Wonderful Treat compilation cassette
- The Embassy Tapes cassette
- Throw compilation CD (Yoyo Recordings)
- International Pop Underground live LP/CD/CS (K Records)
- Neapolitan Metropolitan boxed 7-inch set (Simple Machines)
- Teen Beat 100 compilation 7-inch (Teen Beat)
- Julep compilation LP/CD (Yo Yo)
- Wakefield Vol. 2 V/A CD boxed set (Teen Beat)
- Plea For Peace Take Action compilation CD (Sub City)
- Boys Lie compilation CD (Lookout! Records)
- Yo Yo A Go Go 1999 compilation CD (Yoyo Recordings)
- Lookout! Freakout Episode 2 compilation CD (Lookout! Records)
- Songs For Cassavetes compilation CD (Better Looking Records)
- Lookout! Freakout Episode 3 CD (Lookout! Records)
- Turn-On Tune-In Lookout! DVD (Lookout! Records)

== With Cold Cold Hearts ==
=== Studio albums ===
- Cold Cold Hearts (1997)

=== Singles ===
- Yer So Sweet (Baby Donut) (1996)

== With Partyline ==
- Girls With Glasses 5-song demo CDR August 2004
- Girls With Glasses 6-song debut CDEP (Retard Disco) June 2005
- Spider and the Webs/Partyline split 7-inch (Local Kid) October 2005
- Zombie Terrorist debut full-length CD (Retard Disco) October 24, 2006
- Bad For The Baby 7-inch (Moonflower Records) November, 2009

== With Sex Stains ==
=== Studio albums ===
- Sex Stains (2016) CD/LP (Don Giovanni Records)
