= The Pattern (band) =

American punk rock band

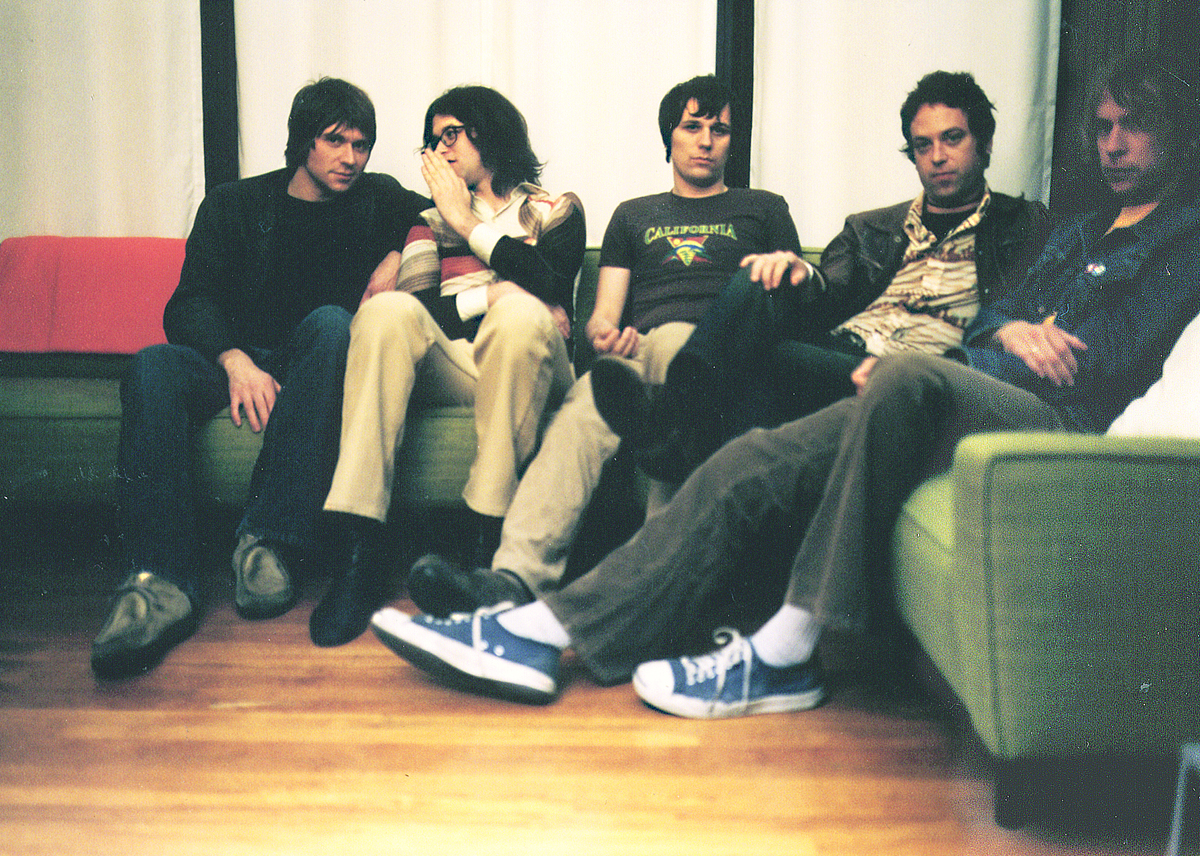
A 2002 promotional photo of The Pattern (credit: Andrew Paynter)

The Pattern was an American punk garage rock band, based in Oakland, California, United States, from 2000 to 2004.

== History ==
The Pattern formed in the summer of 2000, led by vocalist Christopher Appelgren (former lead singer of the PeeChees and owner of Lookout Records), guitarists Jason Rosenberg (formerly of Saint James Infirmary), Andy Asp (former singer and guitar player in Nuisance), bassist Carson Bell (formerly of The Cuts), and drummer Jim Anderson (formerly of Black Fork). During the next few months, the band played shows in the United States and Europe.

After releasing several 7" records (on Jello Biafra's Alternative Tentacles label, Gearhead Records, and San Diego's GSL label) a compilation EP was released in September 2001 entitled Immediately. The band's first EP was released on Lookout Records in the United States and Wichita Recordings in the UK, leading to appearances at the 2001 Reading and Leeds Festivals in the UK. In late 2001, the band embarked on their first major nationwide tour of the U.S., appearing with bands including The Vue, The Donnas, Girls Against Boys, and Yeah Yeah Yeahs, and opening for X and The Strokes.

In 2002, The Pattern's first album Real Feelness, recorded at Tiny Telephone Studios in San Francisco, California, was released. Anderson had left the band and was replaced by drummer Scott Batiste. Shepard Fairey directed the band's first video for the single "Fragile Awareness". After the record's release on Lookout Records (in the US), Wichita Recordings (in the UK), and JVC (in Japan), The Pattern continued to tour the United States and the UK with bands such as The Hives, The Datsuns, The Mooney Suzuki, and Clinic.

Original bassist Carson Bell and drummer Scott Batiste left the band in 2003. The Pattern continued to tour the United States and then eventually disbanded in 2004.

Chris Appelgren now plays drums in West Bestern, Carson Bell went on to play bass with former Pattern tour mates The Mooney Suzuki, Scott Batiste plays drums in the metal band Saviours, and Andy Asp and Jim Anderson play together in SMOKERS.

== Appearances ==
The song "Selling Submarines" was included in Episode 14 "The Countdown" of the Fox television series The O.C..

The song "Nothing of Value" was included in Season 2 Episode 2 "Ask Not" of the television series Roswell (TV series).

== Discography ==
- "Non-Stop" 7" (No Books/My Own Age) Gearhead Records, 2001
- "Wet Circuit City" 7" (Breakfast/Sunned Things Speak) Alternative Tentacles, 2001
- "Feverish" 7" (Finger Us/Worse All The Time) GSL Records, Released 2001
- Immediately EP Wichita Recordings - Released September 25, 2001
- "No Caress" 7" & CDEP (She's a Libra/No Books/Untold) Wichita, October 2001
- Real Feelness Wichita Recordings - Released 2002
- "Fragile Awareness/Abigail 7" & CDEP Released 2002
- "Nothing of Value/Cream Puff War" 7" & CDEP Released 2002
- Various Artists "Lookout Freakout Episode 3"

== Other sources ==
- "London Calling" East Bay Express article about The Pattern
- "Life of the Party" SF Weekly article about The Pattern
- "Now That's What I Call Garage" Feature in the Seattle Stranger
- "NME artist page on The Pattern
