= Audrey Marrs =

American film producer (born 1970)

- Born: Audrey Marie Marrs; June 25, 1970 (age 56); United States
- Education: The Evergreen State College, California College of the Arts
- Occupations: Film producer, CEO, musician

Audrey Marie Marrs (born June 25, 1970) is an American film producer, the chief operating officer of Representational Pictures, Inc. She is a former punk rock musician and co-founder of Ladyfest.

== Biography ==
Marrs is also half-Japanese. Her mother, Mariko, is a native of Japan and also did set decoration for Marrs' Oscar-winning film, Inside Job.

She attended Evergreen State College in Olympia, Washington, graduating with an undergraduate degree in 1996. In 2008, Marrs received a Master of Arts degree in Curatorial Practice from California College of the Arts.

She was married to musician Jesse Michaels. She has since remarried and she and her husband have two children.

=== Film ===
Marrs is the producer of No End in Sight, which is her first film. It won a Special Jury Prize for documentaries at the 2007 Sundance Film Festival. She and Charles H. Ferguson were also nominated for an Oscar in the Best Documentary Feature film category for the film.

Marrs next produced Inside Job with Ferguson, a documentary about the 2008 financial crisis, which was screened at the Cannes Film Festival in May 2010. Inside Job was released by Sony Pictures Classics in October 2010 and subsequently won the Academy Award for Best Documentary Feature.

=== Music ===
Before her film career, Marrs was a participant in the Olympia, Washington indie rock scene. Marrs graduated Tumwater High School in Tumwater, Washington in 1988. She graduated from The Evergreen State College in Olympia, Washington in 1996.

In 2001 she was working as an art curator and was a co-founder of Ladyfest, a global music and arts festival. The next year, Marrs was the keyboardist for the album Girls Get Busy by the punk band Bratmobile. Before that, she was a member of the band Mocket, also on keys and as bassist.
