= Cold Heart =

Cold Heart may refer to:

- Cold Heart (film), a 2001 erotic thriller
- "Cold Heart (Pnau remix)", a 2021 song by Elton John & Dua Lipa
- "Cold Heart", a song by the Kooks from the 2022 album 10 Tracks to Echo in the Dark
- A Cold Heart, a 2003 novel by Jonathan Kellerman
- "A Cold Heart" (Cardiac Arrest), a 1995 television episode
- "The Cold Heart", an 1827 fairy tale by Wilhelm Hauff

== See also ==
- Cold, Cold Heart (disambiguation)
- Cold Hearted (disambiguation)
- Coldheart (disambiguation)
- Jigarthanda (disambiguation)
