= Ladies, Women and Girls =

Studio album by Bratmobile
- Released: October 24, 2000
- Studio: Louder Studios
- Genres: Punk rock; indie rock; riot grrrl
- Length: 31:56
- Label: Lookout!
- Producers: Bratmobile; Tim Green; Jon Nikki

Bratmobile chronology
The Peel Session (1993)	''Ladies, Women and Girls'' (2000)	Girls Get Busy (2002)

Professional ratings
Review scores
Source	Rating
AllMusic	3/5 stars
Kerrang!	4/5 stars
Pitchfork	6.8/10
The Rolling Stone Album Guide	3.5/5 stars
Spin	7/10

Ladies, Women and Girls is a studio album released by Bratmobile in 2000, after a six-year hiatus.

== Critical reception ==
After their years-long separation, Bratmobile returned to the punk rock scene with a new album that was welcomed in Rolling Stone for showing that "the Brat spirit was fully intact". Other writers noted the positive influence of the band's maturation: rock journalist Maria Raha wrote that the album represents "evidence of the band's evolution from both a musical and an ideological standpoint". In Trouser Press, Ira Robbins praised the new material for proving "Bratmobile's ability to transcend amateurishness without abandoning the unfettered emotional freedom that came with it."

== Legacy ==
The Florida-based punk band the Dollyrots cite Ladies, Women and Girls as their favorite album to come out of the Washington, D.C. punk community. "There's a wild, upbeat quality to songs like 'Gimme Brains' and 'Eating Toothpaste' that give a sense of abandon," the band told Washington City Paper in 2026. "The tracks fly along with an infectious energy that gave young female-fronted bands like ours a sound to shoot for."

== Track listing ==
1. "Eating Toothpaste" – 2:26
2. "Gimme Brains" – 2:16
3. "It's Common (But We Don't Talk About It)" – 2:16
4. "Not in Dog Years" – 1:53
5. "You're Fired" – 2:51
6. "Cheap Trick Record" – 1:40
7. "In Love with All My Lovers" – 2:06
8. "90's Nomad" – 2:10
9. "Well You Wanna Know What?" – 3:26
10. "Flavor of the Month Club" – 2:35
11. "Affection Training" – 1:56
12. "Do You Like Me Like That?" – 2:37
13. "Come Hither" – 2:28
14. "Girlfriends Don't Keep" – 1:15

== Personnel ==
Bratmobile

- Molly Neuman – drums
- Erin Smith – guitar
- Allison Wolfe – vocals

Additional credits

- Jon Nikki – bass, keyboards
- Mary Manning – cover photo
- Pat Graham – photography
