= Zombie Terrorist =

Studio album by Partyline
- Released: October 24, 2006
- Recorded: May 26–28, 2006
- Genre: Pop punk • riot grrrl
- Length: 17:59
- Label: Retard Disco
- Producer: See album credits

Partyline chronology
Girls With Glasses (2005)	Zombie Terrorist (2006)

Zombie Terrorist is the first full-length album by Partyline, released on October 24, 2006 on Retard Disco.

== Track listing ==
1. "Party-n-Animal" – 1:30
2. "Zombie Terrorist" – 1:44
3. "Casual Encounters" – 1:20
4. "Trophy Wifey" – 2:07
5. "No Romantic" – 1:22
6. "Ladies' Room" – 1:46
7. "Earthlings" – 1:49
8. "Nuthaus" – 2:08
9. "X-Hearts" – 1:50
10. "Partyline" (Government Issue cover) – 1:08
11. "Who Knows, Who Cares?" – 1:15

== Personnel ==
Partyline

- Crystal Bradley, drums
- Angela Melkisethian, guitar
- Allison Wolfe, vocals

Contributing artists

Michael Cotterman provides bass guitar on all tracks; additional backing vocals were contributed by Hugh McElroy (formerly of Black Eyes) and Chris Paul Richards.

== Album credits ==
Recorded May 26–28, 2006 at Inner Ear Studios.
Engineered by Don Zientara
Produced by Christopher Paul Richards, Don Zientara, and Partyline.
Mastered by Chad Clark at Silver Sonya.
"Partyline" is a Government Issue song.
All songs (except "Partyline") copyright/R/TM by Partyline 2006 and Baby Donut Music, Hussy Musk, Dixie Crystal (ASCAP).
Cover photo by Daisy Lacy
Inside photo by Stephen D. Melkisethian
Design by Hussy Musk/Angela
