= The Real Janelle =

EP by Bratmobile
- Released: 1994
- Recorded: July 1993
- Genres: Punk rock; indie rock; riot grrrl
- Length: 12:12
- Label: Kill Rock Stars

Bratmobile chronology
| Pottymouth (1993) | The Real Janelle (1994) | The Peel Session (1994) |

Professional ratings
Review scores
| Source | Rating |
|---|---|
| AllMusic | 4.5/5 stars |
| Robert Christgau | (neither) |
| The Rolling Stone Album Guide | 4/5 stars |
| Spin Alternative Record Guide | 8/10 |

The Real Janelle is an EP by Bratmobile, released in 1994. It would become Bratmobile's last studio recording in six years. Though released before The Peel Session, that was recorded a year prior.

The EP's title track was inspired by a Born Against song written by Ben Weasel of Screeching Weasel. The Born Against song and The Real Janelle reference Janelle Hessig, a former Bratmobile roadie and East Bay fanzine creator known for producing Tales of Blarg and Desperate Times. The photo on the EP's cover is of Hessig.

== Reception ==
In a favorable review, AllMusic described The Real Janelle as "a big step up from the chaotic Pottymouth, both in musical skill and in clarity of thought." The review goes on to dub the EP's title track "the catchiest song of Bratmobile's career, and a scrappy punk-pop D.I.Y. classic."

Option observed that the EP "still sports Bratmobile's trademark surf-guitar-for-beginners stuttering over a minimally bashed snare, but played much harder than before." The critic added that "on 'Die,' Molly Neuman's drumming lends a dynamic sense that has previously eluded the band."

The journalist and author Marisa Meltzer told The New York Times that "The Real Janelle" was a "paean to girl love" and "also proof that riot grrrl bands weren’t always about screechy confrontation—this is an excellent song for dance parties. It almost sounds as if it could belong on the soundtrack for Grease."

== Track listing ==
1. "The Real Janelle" – 1:41
2. "Brat Girl" – 1:58
3. "Yeah, Huh?" – 2:00
4. "Die" – 1:48
5. "And I Live in a Town Where the Boys Amputate Their Hearts" – 2:41
6. "Where Eagles Dare" (The Misfits cover) – 2:04

== Album credits ==
Bratmobile

- Allison Wolfe – Singer/Songwriter
- Erin Smith – Guitar
- Molly Neuman – Drums

Kill Rock Stars’ co-founder Slim Moon shares lead vocals on “Where Eagles Dare.”

Recorded July 1993 at Avast, Seattle, Washington.

Engineered by Stuart Hallerman.

Mixed by Stuart Hallerman, Slim Moon, and Bratmobile.

Prints by Tinúviel.
