= International Pop Underground Convention (album) =

Compilation album by Various artists
- Released: 1992
- Recorded: August 1991
- Genre: Indie rock, punk rock, alternative rock
- Label: K Records

Professional ratings
Review scores
Source	Rating
Allmusic	4/5 stars

International Pop Underground Convention is a live compilation LP/CD/cassette which documents the 1991 music festival of the same name. Various recordings from the festival were compiled by K Records and released as a double album and CD, featuring music by twenty-one different bands.

== Convention at Olympia ==
The 1991 International Pop Underground Convention took place in Olympia, Washington. It was all organized by Calvin Johnson, founder of the Olympia record label K Records. The six-day festival centered on a series of performances at the Capitol Theater, and the theme of the Convention focused on the independence of artists- a "fierce resistance to corporate takeover."

== Production ==
Veteran engineer Patrick Maley is credited as producer for all tracks, with assistance by Sara Lorimer and Byram Abbott. Most tracks were recorded live in the YoYo Recording Studio located inside the Capitol Theater, while a few were recorded at two of the Convention's associated venues, the North Shore Surf Club and Capital Lake Park.

== Track listing ==
The album presents twenty-one different bands from the Convention with the following songs:

1. Scrawl – "Clock Song (Go Girl Go)" - 3:06
2. The Nation of Ulysses – "Shakedown" - 3:24
3. The Pastels – "Speedway Star" - 2:50
4. Melvins – "Charmicarmicat" - 5:45
5. L7 – "Packin' a Rod" - 2:33
6. The Spinanes – "Jad Fair Drives Women Wild" - 4:09
7. Seaweed – "Bill" - 3:03
8. Shadowy Men on a Shadowy Planet – "They Don't Call Them Chihuahuas Anymore" - 2:31
9. Kreviss - "Sandi's Song" – 3:49
10. Some Velvet Sidewalk – "Curiosity" - 1:58
11. Mecca Normal – "Strong White Male" - 3:01
12. Courtney Love – "Motorcycle Boy" - 2:24
13. Unwound – "Bionic" - 3:06
14. Rose Melberg – "My Day" - 2:47
15. Fugazi – "Reprovisional" - 4:39
16. Bratmobile – "Punk Rock Dream Come True" - 1:49
17. Girl Trouble – "Bring on the Dancing Girls" - 3:18
18. Kicking Giant – "This Sex" - 4:30
19. Fastbacks – "Impatience" - 2:51
20. Mark Hosler, Steve Fisk, and Bob Basanich – "Customer Service Breakthrough" - 6:21
21. Beat Happening – "Nancy Sin" - 2:47

An uncredited recording of eleven seconds of crowd noise makes an unlisted Track 22 at the end of the original CD. The double LP vinyl release contains two songs not found on the CD version: "Alright Baby Baby Whatcha Doin'" by Nikki McClure and "Burn The Flag" by I Scream Truck, incorrectly attributed on the album as Ice Cream Truck.
