= Mocket =

- Kill Rock Stars press photo for the release of album Pro Forma

Background information
- Origin: Olympia, WA, United States
- Genres: Art rock; post-punk; indie rock
- Years active: 1995–1999
- Labels: Up Records, Kill Rock Stars, K Records, Punk in My Vitamins, Southern Records
- Members: Matt Steinke; Audrey Marrs
- Past members: Caroline Rue (sometimes spelled Carolyn); Danny Sasaki

Mocket was an indie art rock band formed in 1995 in Washington State. They created several albums and EPs which were released on Up Records, K Records and Kill Rock Stars. The band was led by multi-instrumentalist Matt Steinke.
