= Music of Jigarthanda (2014 film) =

2014 albums by Santhosh Narayanan

The music for the 2014 Tamil-language crime comedy film Jigarthanda (transl. cold-hearted) is composed by Santhosh Narayanan. The film directed by Karthik Subbaraj and produced by S. Kathiresan, stars Siddharth, Bobby Simha, Lakshmi Menon, Karunakaran and Guru Somasundaram. The music for the film released under two different albums—one contains the original songs which had lyrics written by Muthamil, Arunraja Kamaraj, Anthony Daasan, Pradeep Kumar and Sean Roldan, and the other contained several cues of original music underscored in the background. The first album was released in March 2014, five months before the film's theatrical release with the second album being unveiled after the film's release. Both the albums were distributed under the Think Music label. Santhosh's work met with acclaim, both from critics and audiences, regarding it as one of his best works.

== Background ==
Jigarthanda is Santhosh's second consecutive association with Subbaraj, after scoring the latter's debut film Pizza (2012). With this film, Santhosh launched the Sandy Jazz Band, whose members—him playing the keyboard, Australian musicians Hamish Stuart and Graham Jesse playing the drums and saxophone and Chennai-based Leon James and Naveen Napier, playing the electronic piano and guitar, respectively. Besides, he also recorded music with a street folk band for a song, and also worked with Pradeep Kumar, Anthony Daasan, Sean Roldan and Kalyani Nair to provide vocals. Lyricist Arunraja Kamaraj who previously wrote songs for Pizza (2012) and Pizza II: Villa (2013), debuted as a singer through this film. He provided vocals for the song "Ding Dong" which was recorded in a way that he would mimic the voice of Vinu Chakravarthy for the antagonist's introduction. The album accompanied a variety of genres, which includes fusion of folk, rap and electronic music, and was primarily recorded at the Studios 301 in Sydney, where Santhosh had recorded music for his previous films, for two months.

== Critical reception ==
The album received positive response. Srinivasa Ramanujam of The Times of India stated, "Santhosh Narayanan shows, yet again, that he is one of those composers to watch out for — both for his new sounds and tunes. Jigarthanda is another worthy addition" and rated the album 3 out of 5. Karthik Srinivasan of Milliblog reviewed that "Jigarthanda is Santhosh at his eclectic best". According to Pulari M Baskar of Film Companion, Santhosh's music is described as "unpolished yet pleasing on the ears, bustling and intense [...] the vocal diversity in this film's soundtrack really gives a totality to the experience of a big-city boy in a small town." He further added that the background score "echoes the small-town feel" of Madurai.

Baradwaj Rangan in his review wrote, "It's a good thing Santhosh Narayanan is around. His flamboyant score imbues even the weaker scenes with a Tarantinoesque swagger". A reviewer from Sify wrote, "Santosh Narayanan's background score is the major plus of the movie, as he is able to capture the mood of the film. The songs are good, short and mostly in the background." S. Saraswathi of Rediff.com wrote "Music by Santhosh Narayanan is a winner". Anupama Subramanian of Deccan Chronicle wrote "Santhosh Narayanan's musical score lends a solid support to the proceedings."

== Albums ==
=== Original soundtrack ===
Jigarthanda

Soundtrack album by Santhosh Narayanan
- Released: 3 March 2014
- Recorded: 2013–2014
- Studios: Studios 301, Sydney
- Genre: Feature film soundtrack
- Length: 26:51
- Language: Tamil
- Label: Think Music
- Producer: Santhosh Narayanan

Santhosh Narayanan chronology
Cuckoo (2014)	Jigarthanda (2014)	Madras (2014)

The motion picture soundtrack to Jigarthanda consisted of nine tunes—seven songs and two instrumentals—as revealed in the official track list on 1 March 2014. Distributed by Think Music, the album was launched at an event held in Sathyam Cinemas, Chennai on 3 March, which saw the presence of film producer Kalaipuli S. Thanu and director Bharathiraja. A live band performance of Anthony Daasan took place and theatrical trailer of the film was screened at the event. The soundtrack of the Telugu-dubbed version Chikkadu Dorakkadu was released on 17 July 2014 at Taj Deccan in Hyderabad. Unlike the original version, the Telugu album had five songs.

Jigarthanda (Tamil)
No.	Title	Lyrics	Artist(s)	Length
1.	"Kannamma"	Muthamil	Rita Daasan, Anthony Daasan	3:33
2.	"Ding Dong"	Arunraja Kamaraj	Arunraja Kamaraj, Mose	3:54
3.	"Paandi Naatu Kodi"	Anthony Daasan	Anthony Daasan	3:38
4.	"Dhesayum Ezhundhaney"	Pradeep Kumar	Meenakshi Iyer, Santhosh Narayanan	2:47
5.	"Baby"	Muthamil	Santhosh Narayanan	3:02
6.	"Jigar"	Pradeep Kumar	Pradeep Kumar	3:28
7.	"Thanda"		Instrumental	2:18
8.	"Hoo Haa"	Sean Roldan	Sean Roldan, Santhosh Narayanan	1:41
9.	"Ottam"		Sandy's Jazz Band	2:35
Total length:				26:51

Chikkadu Dorakkadu (Telugu)
No.	Title	Lyrics	Singer(s)	Length
1.	"Venchindi Venchindi"	Vennelakanti	Divya	3:37
2.	"Neelo Gundala"	Chandrabose	Raghu Kunche	3:18
3.	"Dizaya"	Vennelakanti	Saradha Mohan	2:47
4.	"Baby"	Vennelakanti	Abhishek	3:04
5.	"Ding Dong"	Chandrabose	Azam Sheriff	3:56
Total length:				16:39

=== Film score ===
Jigarthanda

Film score by Santhosh Narayanan
- Released: 25 August 2014
- Recorded: 2013–2014
- Studio: Studios 301, Sydney
- Genre: Film score
- Length: 40:42
- Label: Think Music
- Producer: Santhosh Narayanan

Santhosh initially intended to bridge the original songs and background score, compiling it into a single album. After the film's release, the second album which primarily contains the film score and dialogues were released at the Radio Mirchi FM Station in Chennai on 25 August 2014.

No.	Title	Length
1.	"Assault Sethu"	1:06
2.	"Brains"	1:01
3.	"Boy from Madurai"	1:58
4.	"Kuppa Padam"	1:10
5.	"Results"	1:06
6.	"Oorni"	0:18
7.	"Giri from Madurai"	1:13
8.	"Potti Kada Pazhani"	0:41
9.	"Sethu Gang"	1:06
10.	"Ice Cube Sarakku"	0:50
11.	"Kuruvamma Kaviyam Hallucination"	0:25
12.	"Sorry Teacher"	2:22
13.	"Ruthless Killers"	0:49
14.	"Titanic"	2:28
15.	"Half Time"	1:46
16.	"Muthu Sir (Acting Teacher)"	1:32
17.	"Kayal's Love"	0:51
18.	"Inside a Delusional Mind"	0:28
19.	"Company Rules"	2:34
20.	"Film Roll"	0:45
21.	"Beginning of the End"	1:00
22.	"Palani's Dream"	2:30
23.	"Didgeridoo"	0:38
24.	"Soul Searching"	1:13
25.	"Epic Proportions"	6:55
26.	"Uyir Pichai"	2:54
27.	"Salfogree"	1:30
Total length:		40:42

== Awards and nominations ==
Award (Note: Awards, festivals and organisations are in alphabetical order.)	Date of ceremony (Note: Date is linked to the article about the awards held that year, wherever possible.)	Category	Recipient(s)	Result	Ref(s)
Ananda Vikatan Cinema Awards	8 January 2015	Best Music Director	Santhosh Narayanan (Note: Also for Cuckoo and Madras)	Won	
Norway Tamil Film Festival Awards	23–26 April 2015	Best Music Director	Santhosh Narayanan (Note: Also for Cuckoo)	Won	
Vijay Awards	25 April 2015	Best Background Score	Santhosh Narayanan	Won	

== Legacy ==
Jigarthanda has been regarded as one of Santhosh Narayanan's best soundtracks. The theme music for Simha's character Assault Sethu has been described as one of his best compositions, and was used as the primary background music for his production banner Stone Bench Creations.

== Use in sequel ==
Jigarthanda DoubleX is the spiritual successor and prequel to Jigarthanda, released in 2023. Santhosh Narayanan was retained as the composer reusing the themes from the first film while composing fresh themes.
