= Cold Cold Heart (band) =

- Origin: Massachusetts
- Genre: Alternative Country
- Years active: 1996 – present
- Label: Black Rose Records
- Website: www.coldcoldheartband.com

Cold Cold Heart is an alternative country band from Massachusetts. Their first CD, Prides Crossing, was released in 1997 with a follow-up, Blue Collar Attitude, released in 2007. They are named in tribute to the Hank Williams song "Cold, Cold Heart".

== History ==
Cold Cold Heart was formed in 1996 by Joe Hannigan

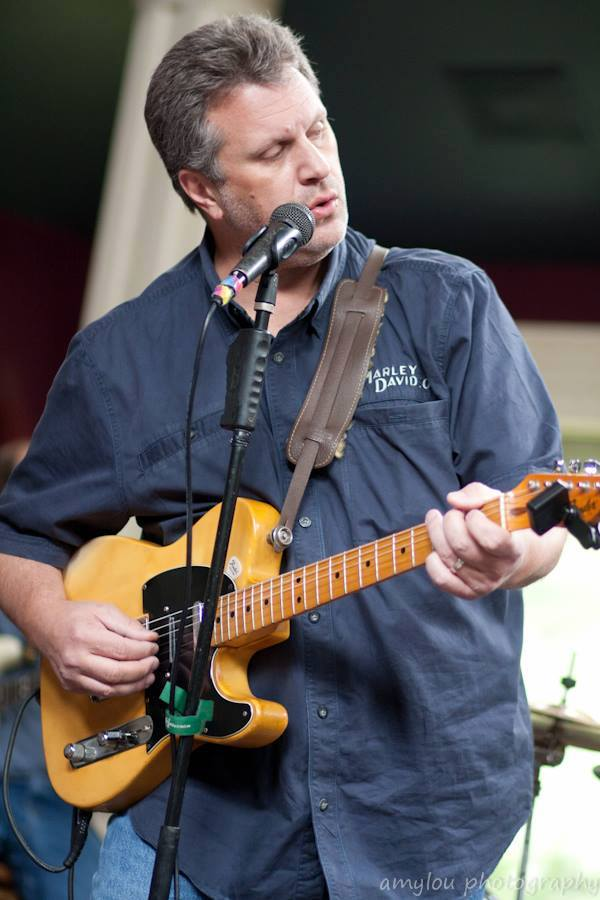
Joe Hannigan

(Lead Guitar, Vocals), Carl Bergman (Drums), Charlie Ortolani (Guitar, Vocals) and John Tate (Bass, Vocals). The band chose "Cold Cold Heart" as a tribute to Hank Williams and his hit song of the same name. Their first CD "Prides Crossing" was recorded and released on the independent Black Rose Record Label in 1997.

Piano player Sammy Brown joined the group in 2006. The songwriting team of Hannigan, Tate and Brown went to work on the band's second album "Blue Collar Attitude". It was recorded at Solitaire Studios and released on the independent Jack Sauce Label in 2007.

Cold Cold Heart have collectively performed as openers for Charlie Daniels, Willie Nelson, Jerry Jeff Walker, Leon Russell, Ricky Nelson, Roy Orbison and Sleepy LaBeef.

== Discography ==
- Blue Collar Attitude (2007)
- Prides Crossing (1997)
