= Super Genius (album) =

Studio album by Circus Lupus
- Released: 1992
- Genre: Post-hardcore
- Label: Dischord

Circus Lupus chronology
Super Genius (1992)	Solid Brass (1993)

Super Genius is a studio album released by the band Circus Lupus in 1992. The CD was re-released by Dischord Records in Washington DC in 2003. The album was described as "more strange and threatening", and a "ricocheting pinball of wailing vocals, snaking riffs that block and tackle". Team Rock noted it for having a "scuzzy, grungy undercurrent".

== Track listing ==
1. Unrequited
2. Cyclone Billy
3. Pacifier
4. Breaking Point
5. Straight Through the Heart
6. Marbles
7. Mean Hot & Blessed
8. Cat Kicking Jerk
9. Blue Baby
10. Amish Blessing
11. Pulp
12. Tightrope Walker
13. Chinese Nitro

== Personnel ==
- Arika Casebolt (drums)
- Chris Hamley (guitars)
- Seth Lorinczi (bass)
- Chris Thomson (vocals)
- Eli Janney (producer)
