= The PeeChees =

American punk band

- Origin: Oakland, California, U.S.
- Genres: Punk, post-hardcore, post-punk
- Years active: 1994–1998
- Labels: Kill Rock Stars, Lookout!, Skinny Girl, Damaged Goods, Rugger Bugger, Sub Pop, Roxy
- Past members: Christopher Appelgren; Molly Neuman; Carlos Cañedo; Rop Vasquez
- Website: The PeeChees at KRS

The PeeChees (a.k.a. The PeeChee All-Season Sensations) were an American punk band formed in 1994 by Lookout Records co-owners Christopher Appelgren (The Pattern, Bumblescrump, The Lefties), Molly Neuman (Bratmobile, The Frumpies, Love or Perish), along with guitarist Carlos Cañedo (Rice, Love or Perish, Beehive & The Baracudas), and bass player Rop Vasquez (Rice, Semi-Automatic, The Lefties).

The PeeChees released three albums on the Kill Rock Stars label, and singles on Kill Rock Stars, Lookout! Records, and Sub Pop, and were on many compilations during the mid-1990s. They toured the United States and Europe and performed with label mates Bikini Kill, Unwound, and Sleater-Kinney and performed and collaborated with Rocket From The Crypt and Rancid. They were peripherally involved in the Riot grrrl movement, with Neuman (one of the movement's founders) playing drums for the band. The band disbanded in 1998.

== Band members ==
- Christopher Appelgren – singer
- Molly Neuman – drums
- Carlos Cañedo – guitar
- Rop Vaszquez – bass

== Discography ==
=== Albums ===
Year	Title	Label	Other information
1996	Do The Math	Kill Rock Stars	First album.
1997	Games People Play	Kill Rock Stars	Final studio album.
1998	Life	Kill Rock Stars	Compilation of singles and compilation tracks. Released posthumously.

=== Singles and EPs ===
Year	Title	Label	Other information
1994	Cup of Glory	Kill Rock Stars	"Cheap Fun", "Grease" b/w "Fine Watch".
1995	Spend Some Time With	Skinnie Girl Records	Split with Long Hind Legs.
1996	Scented Gum	Lookout! Records	"Genuine Article", "Tea Biscuit to Show" b/w "Olive Oil", "Tom Foolery". Recorded by John Reis and Gar Wood.
1996	Radio Disappears	G.I. Productions	Split with The Drags.
1997	Love Moods	Rugger Bugger	"New Moscow Woman" b/w "Quadruple Bypass"
1997	"Antarticists"	Roxy	b/w "Love Is the Law" cover, originally by The Suburbs.
1998	"Sing Like Me (Elliott Smith)"	Damaged Goods	b/w "Other Ice Age". Picture disc.
1998	"Dallas"	Sub Pop	b/w "If You Don't Know (Now You Know)". Released as part of the label's limited edition "Single of the Month" series

=== Non-album tracks ===
Year	Album/Source	Label	Song(s)	Other information
1994	Rock Stars Kill	Kill Rock Stars	"Patty Coahuila"	First band release. Compilation of Kill Rock Stars bands that included Rancid, Kathleen Hanna, and Team Dresch.
1995	A Slice Of Lemon	Lookout! Records/Kill Rock Stars	"Maintenance Free"	Compilation of Lookout! and Kill Rock Stars bands that included Elliott Smith and The Mr. T Experience.
1998	Taking A Chance On Chances	Troubleman Unlimited Records	"Second Grade"	Compilation of bands that included Monorchid.
2001	Songs for Cassavetes Soundtrack	Better Looking Records	"Pepper (live)"	Live recording from 1996. Featured in the documentary Songs for Cassavetes along with interviews from the members.
