= Cold Cold Hearts (album) =

Studio album by Cold Cold Hearts
- Released: April 8, 1997
- Recorded: December 1996
- Genre: Punk rock, indie rock
- Length: 21:59
- Label: Kill Rock Stars
- Producer: Mark Robinson; Cold Cold Hearts

Cold Cold Hearts is the 1997 debut solo album by the American riot grrrl band Cold Cold Hearts. It is a follow-up to their 7" single, "Yer So Sweet (Baby Donut)" and the band's only full-length studio album.

== Track listing ==
1. VxRx – 1:41
2. Any Resemblance ... – 2:04
3. 5 Signs: Scorpio – 1:44
4. Cute Boy Discount – 3:17
5. Broken Teeth – 2:06
6. Lady! Reversible! (Alleged.) – 1:41
7. Maybe Scabies – 1:44
8. 1-2-3 Many! – 1:45
9. Sorry Yer Band Sux ("Rebels Without a Brains") – 2:10
10. Yer So Sweet (Baby Donut) – 1:26
11. State Trooper in the Left Lane, Nattles! – 2:16

== Critical reception ==
Remarking on the relative enduring freshness of the songs, AllMusic called the album "a solid entry into the contemporary tradition of post-riot grrrl Northwestern rock".

"Any Resemblance ... " was included in a "Riot Grrrl Essential Listening Guide" compiled by Evelyn McDonnell and Elisabeth Vincentelli for The New York Times.

== Credits ==
- Erin Smith - Guitar, Vocals (Background), Photography
- Allison Wolfe - Vocals
- Natalie Mencinsky (Credited as "Nattles") - Bass, Artwork (Design)
- Katherine Brown - Drums
- Mark Robinson - Vocals (Background), Producer, Engineer, Art Direction
- Matt Lettsinger - Engineer
- Rob Christiansen - Engineer
