= Madras (soundtrack) =

- Soundtrack cover

Soundtrack album by Santhosh Narayanan
- Released: 23 June 2014
- Recorded: 2013–2014
- Genre: Feature film soundtrack
- Length: 24:07
- Language: Tamil
- Label: Think Music
- Producer: Santhosh Narayanan

Santhosh Narayanan chronology
Jigarthanda (2014)	Madras (2014)	Enakkul Oruvan (2014)

Madras is the soundtrack album of the 2014 Tamil drama film of the same name written and directed by Pa. Ranjith and produced by Studio Green. Santhosh Narayanan composed the soundtrack album and background score for the film. The album consists of seven tracks with five songs and two themes. While Gana Bala penned the lyrics for the two songs sung by him, the remaining three were penned by Kabilan and Umadevi. The soundtrack album was released on 23 June 2014.

== Background ==
Ranjith renewed his association with Santhosh Narayanan for the soundtrack and score of Madras. Santhosh considered the re-recording of the film's music as the highlight. As with all of his previous ventures, he recorded the music and score at the Studios 301 in Sydney, Australia, with the Studio Orchestra performing the score and singer Pradeep Kumar performed the acoustic guitar on two themes.

The song "Enga Ooru Madras" is a dappankuthu number which was intended to showcase the life of people living in North Chennai beyond the stereotypical lens. Santhosh had fused genres by synchronizing "the tempo of dubstep with Chennai’s street gaana beats". Gana Bala who had a breakthrough in Attakathi (2012), reunited with the director-composer duo for two songs: "Kakidha Kappal" which Santhosh considered one of his favorite and "Irandhidava", which had a minor tweak on the marana gaana (transl. death song) lyrics.

Uma Devi K, a long-term friend of Ranjith and literary writer had written lyrics for the song "Naan Nee", her maiden stint as a lyricist. Devi met Ranjith at an event, who stated that he had likened to Devi's literary works owing to the language and text and few months later, Athiyan Athirai, an assistant of Ranjith contacted her as the team were in search of a lyricist. Devi who did not have knowledge of writing lyrics for films, had met Ranjith discussing about a tune or situation, and thereby wrote three pallavis and four charanams, which led Ranjith impressed. Two verses of the song had depicted about the experiences of people grew up in villages. Regarding the term "thaaba poo" (transl. flower of desire) which she coined, Devi admitted that he termed it in poetic context where the 'flower of lust' refers to the women and the man loved, as the 'thirst of the flower'. She added "Even before Aandal, there was a theri (Buddhist nun) who spoke of love. It is nothing new in our Tamil literature. The fact that in entire Sangam literature there are more agam poems (poems of internal) than puram shows us that poets want Tamil society to be built on love."

== Release ==
The music rights were purchased by Think Music. The film's soundtrack was released at Taj Coromandel, Chennai on 23 June 2014. Suriya, Sivakumar and the film's cast and crew attended the audio launch event. Gana Bala performed on stage during the audio launch.

== Track listing ==
No.	Title	Lyrics	Singer(s)	Length
1.	"Madras"	Kabilan	Hariharasudhan, Meenakshi Iyer	4:24
2.	"Kakidha Kappal"	Gana Bala	Gana Bala	3:33
3.	"Kaali Love" (Theme)		Santhosh Narayanan	1:52
4.	"Naan Nee"	Uma Devi K	Shakthisree Gopalan, Dhee	4:13
5.	"Aagayam Theepidicha"	Kabilan	Pradeep Kumar	3:50
6.	"Irandhidavaa"	Gana Bala	Gana Bala	4:57
7.	"Suvar" (Theme)		Santhosh Narayanan	1:18
Total length:				24:07

== Reception ==
The soundtrack album received positive reviews from critics. The Times of India gave a review stating "When you have a title like Madras, most often you would see the album packed with kuthu numbers. However, Santhosh Narayanan scores a likeable album that not just keeps in line with the theme, but also manages to give a mix of everything". S R Ashok Kumar of The Hindu labelled "Madras", "Irandhidava" and "Kakidha Kappal" to be hits among the masses, further labelling the song "Naan Nee" as "interesting" and the theme music's as "pleasant to the ear". Karthik Srinivasan of Milliblog called it a "Typically likeable and exotic Santhosh concoction". Vipin of Music Aloud stated that, "Santhosh Narayanan makes it three on three this year with Madras" but cited that the "increasing incidence of repetitive sounds" was a little concerning.

Anupama Subramanian of Deccan Chronicle complimented that the background score helps in aiding the film. S. Saraswathi of Rediff.com added "Santhosh Narayanan as usual is excellent. His background music score and songs provide the right ambience for the film." Malini Mannath of The New Indian Express wrote "Santhosh Narayanan's rerecording is judiciously done enhancing the mood." Haricharan Pudipeddi of IANS wrote "Santosh's music has by now become an integral part of all his films. It goes without saying how important his contribution has become to elevate the overall cinematic experience. He takes Madras to a new level with his background score."

== Plagiarism allegations ==
There was speculations arose that Santhosh had allegedly plagiarised the tune of Hans Zimmer's composition "Time" from Inception (2010) which critic Sudhir Srinivasan in his review for The Hindu. However, Santhosh denied the accusations, while admitting that themes and scores were dissected and discussed in social media. He shared the complete score through his social platforms.

== Accolades ==
Award	Date of ceremony (Note: Date is linked to the article about the awards held that year, wherever possible.)	Category	Recipient(s)	Result	Ref.
Ananda Vikatan Cinema Awards	8 January 2015	Best Music Director	Santhosh Narayanan (Note: Also for Cuckoo, Jigarthanda)	Won	
Ananda Vikatan Cinema Awards	8 January 2015	Best Playback Singer – Male	Pradeep Kumar for "Aagayam Theepidicha"	Won	
Ananda Vikatan Cinema Awards	8 January 2015	Best Playback Singer – Female	Shakthisree Gopalan for "Naan Nee"	Won	
Filmfare Awards South	26 June 2015	Best Music Director – Tamil	Santhosh Narayanan	Nominated	
Filmfare Awards South	26 June 2015	Best Male Playback Singer – Tamil	Pradeep Kumar for "Aagayam Theepidicha"	Won	
Filmfare Awards South	26 June 2015	Best Female Playback Singer – Tamil	Shakthisree Gopalan, Dhee for "Naan Nee"	Nominated	
Mirchi Music Awards South	14 September 2014	Album of the Year – Tamil	Madras	Nominated	
Mirchi Music Awards South	14 September 2014	Song of the Year – Tamil	"Naan Nee"	Nominated	
Mirchi Music Awards South	14 September 2014	Male Vocalist of the Year – Tamil	Pradeep Kumar for "Aagayam Theepidicha"	Nominated	
Mirchi Music Awards South	14 September 2014	Female Vocalist of the Year – Tamil	Shakthisree Gopalan for "Naan Nee"	Nominated	
Mirchi Music Awards South	14 September 2014	Lyricist of the Year – Tamil	Kabilan for "Aagayam Theepidicha"	Won	
Mirchi Music Awards South	14 September 2014	Music Composer of the Year – Tamil	Santhosh Narayanan for "Naan Nee"	Won	
Mirchi Music Awards South	14 September 2014	Upcoming Lyricist of the Year – Tamil	Uma Devi K for "Naan Nee"	Won	
Norway Tamil Film Festival Awards	23–26 April 2015	Best Playback Singer (Female)	Shakthisree Gopalan for "Naan Nee"	Nominated	
South Indian International Movie Awards	6–7 August 2015	Best Music Director – Tamil	Santhosh Narayanan	Nominated	
South Indian International Movie Awards	6–7 August 2015	Best Male Playback Singer – Tamil	Pradeep Kumar for "Aagayam Theepidicha"	Won	
South Indian International Movie Awards	6–7 August 2015	Best Female Playback Singer – Tamil	Shakthisree Gopalan for "Naan Nee"	Nominated	
Vijay Awards	25 April 2015	Best Male Playback Singer	Pradeep Kumar for "Aagayam Theepidicha"	Won	
Vijay Awards	25 April 2015	Best Female Playback Singer	Shakthisree Gopalan for "Naan Nee"	Nominated	
