= Cuckoo (2014 soundtrack) =

2014 soundtrack album by Santhosh Narayanan

- Soundtrack album cover

Soundtrack album by Santhosh Narayanan
- Released: 21 February 2014
- Recorded: 2013–2014
- Genre: Feature film soundtrack
- Length: 26:04
- Language: Tamil
- Label: Think Music
- Producer: Santhosh Narayanan

Santhosh Narayanan chronology
Pizza 2: The Villa (2013)	Cuckoo (2014)	Jigarthanda (2014)

Cuckoo is the musical album composed by Santhosh Narayanan to the 2014 Tamil film Cuckoo, directed by journalist-turned-filmmaker Raju Murugan in his directorial debut. The film starred Attakathi Dinesh and debutant Malavika Nair in leading roles, and was jointly produced by the companies Fox Star Studios and The Next Big Film Venture. The soundtrack album has six tracks, five of them being written by Yugabharathi and one song by Gaana Bala and R. K. Sundar.

The score and songs were composed with the use of live and acoustic instrumentation as the film's plot focused on a relationship between the blind couple, which needed a "lively and breezy album". Sean Roldan and Vaikom Vijayalakshmi made their debut in Tamil film music, by contributing to the soundtrack.

The album's release coincided with a promotional event held at Sathyam Cinemas, Chennai on 21 February 2014. The same day, the tracks were distributed by Think Music through digital and physical formats. It received positive reviews from music critics, praising Narayanan's melodious compositions, production of the soundtrack and the choice of singers. At the 2014 Ananda Vikatan Cinema Awards, Narayanan won the Best Music Director award (also for his work in Jigarthanda and Madras). The soundtrack further won the Mirchi Music Award for Best Tamil Musical Album.

== Background ==
On writing the storyline of Cuckoo, which focused on a visually-impaired couple, Raju Murugan approached Santhosh Narayanan to compose the film's musical score and soundtrack as he wanted the music to be "lively" and "heartwarming". Narayanan, who received accolades for his work in the soundtrack and score composed for Soodhu Kavvum, had been roped in as a part of multiple projects since then, before signing for the film. According to Narayanan, Cuckoo was a "breezy film" and also a "totally different experience" for the composer.

The recording of the film's songs and score took place at Studio 301 located at Sydney, Australia. Narayanan collaborated with musicians who worked for veteran composers like Ilaiyaraaja, Deva and M. S. Viswanathan, while further working with Grammy-award-winning artists and street musicians for few tracks in the album. The soundtrack was recorded using acoustic instruments with a 60-piece orchestra from Australia being used in entirety. The film score was composed with the help of live instrumentation.

Narayanan's protégés Sean Roldan (his debut in Tamil cinema) and Pradeep Kumar, contributed to the soundtrack, before gaining popularity in the Tamil music scene as singer-composer respectively. Roldan, who was credited as R. Raghavendra, had recorded two of the songs — "Potta Pulla" and "Manasula Soora Kaathey", the latter was his first song in Tamil. Kumar had also gave vocals for two of the tracks, along with his wife, Kalyani Nair, also a playback singer. Vaikom Vijayalakshmi, a visually-impaired singer, had recorded the track "Kodaiyila", which marked her first song in Tamil. Other artists such as Gana Bala, Anthony Daasan and Dhee too contributed vocals to the soundtrack.

== Track listing ==
No.	Title	Singer(s)	Length
1.	"Enda Mapla"	Gana Bala, Sathish, Dhee	4:23
2.	"Manasula Soora Kaathey"	Sean Roldan, Divya Ramani	4:26
3.	"Potta Pulla"	Sean Roldan	4:15
4.	"Agasatha"	Kalyani Nair, Pradeep Kumar	5:02
5.	"Kalyanamam Kalyanam"	Anthony Daasan	3:55
6.	"Kodaiyila"	Vaikom Vijayalakshmi, Kalyani Nair, Pradeep Kumar	4:03
Total length:			26:04

== Release ==
The soundtrack album featured six tracks with one song being written by Gana Bala and the rest of the tracks are written by Yugabharathi. The audio rights were secured by Think Music. It was launched on 21 February 2014 at a promotional event held at Sathyam Cinemas, Chennai. The event saw the attendance of actors Kamal Haasan, Suriya and Vijay Sethupathi along with directors Atlee, Karthik Subbaraj, Pa. Ranjith, Cheran, Vetrimaaran, Vijay Kumar and Naveen, with the cast and crew of the film. Two songs from the film and a theatrical trailer were screened at the event, which was followed by a live a cappella performance organised by Santhosh and his musical team, received well by the celebrities and the crew members.

== Reception ==
The Times of India rated the album 3.5 out of 5 and called the album as "blissful". Vipin Nair of Music Aloud rated the album 8.5 out of 10, reviewing it as "The best soundtrack that composer Santhosh Narayanan has produced yet!" Karthik Srinivasan of Milliblog wrote "Santhosh soars far beyond his familiar style and produces a cracker of a soundtrack!" Haricharan Pudipeddi of The New Indian Express wrote, "Santosh Narayanan's life-affirming music makes you ignore fewer flaws you may across in the film". Sify wrote that the "outstanding music and BGM" was a "major plus". Karthik Krishnaswamy of The Indian Express gave 3.5 out of 5, saying that the "songs gives the same pleasant appeal as of Santhosh Naryanan's earlier ones".

Milliblog listed the album as the second-best Tamil soundtrack of 2014, while "Manasula Soora Kaathey" was listed in the second position. Two of the tracks: "Manasula Soora Kaathey" and "Agasatha" were placed in the Top 25 Tamil Film Songs, in the annual review round-up titled Music Aloud Playback – Best of 2014.

== Awards ==
Award (Note: Awards, festivals and organisations are in alphabetical order.)	Category	Recipient(s)	Result	Ref.
Ananda Vikatan Cinema Awards	Best Music Director	Santhosh Narayanan (Also for Jigarthanda and Madras)	Won	
Filmfare Awards South	Best Lyricist – Tamil	Yugabharathi	Nominated	
Mirchi Music Awards South	Best Music Album – Tamil	Cuckoo – Santhosh Narayanan	Won	
Mirchi Music Awards South	Best Lyricist – Tamil	Yugabharathi	Nominated	
Mirchi Music Awards South	Best Female Playback Singer – Tamil	Kalyani Nair for "Agasatha"	Nominated	
Mirchi Music Awards South	Best Female Playback Singer – Tamil	Vaikom Vijayalakshmi for "Kodaiyila"	Nominated	
Mirchi Music Awards South	Best Music Director – Tamil	Santhosh Narayanan	Nominated	
Mirchi Music Awards South	Song of the Year – Tamil	"Manasula Soora Kaathey"	Nominated	
Mirchi Music Awards South	Upcoming Male Vocalist – Tamil	Sean Roldan for "Manasula Soora Kaathey"	Nominated	
South Indian International Movie Awards	Best Lyricist – Tamil	Yugabharathi	Won	
Vijay Awards	Best Music Director	Santhosh Narayanan	Nominated	
Vijay Awards	Best Lyricist	Yugabharathi	Nominated	
