= Cold Cold Hearts =

American punk rock band

- L to R: Nattles, Katherine Brown, Erin Smith and Allison Wolfe

Background information
- Origin: Washington, D.C.
- Genres: Punk rock, riot grrrl
- Years active: 1995–1998
- Label: Kill Rock Stars (1996–1997)
- Past members: Allison Wolfe; Erin Smith; Nattles; Katherine Brown; Lora McFarlane
- Website: page at label website

Cold Cold Hearts was a punk rock band formed in Washington, D.C. in 1995. Comprising singer and songwriter Allison Wolfe, guitarist and back-up vocalist Erin Smith, bass player Nattles, and drummer Katherine Brown, the band released one 7" single in 1996, and a full-length self-titled record the following year, both through Olympia, Washington-based label Kill Rock Stars. Wolfe and Smith were members of the band Bratmobile prior to forming Cold Cold Hearts; they revived Bratmobile (with bandmember Molly Neuman) after Cold Cold Hearts disbanded.

In a retrospective in The New York Times, Elisabeth Vincentelli wrote: "Everything about that combo was bare-bones: its discography (one 7” and one album), its songs (under two minutes) and its production (minimal but poppy). But Cold Cold Hearts burned bright and was funny, too, fully indulging in the humor that marked Bratmobile's best songs."

== Discography ==
- "Yer So Sweet (Baby Donut)" (1996)
- Cold Cold Hearts (1997)
