= Yer So Sweet (Baby Donut) =

Single by Cold Cold Hearts

from the album Cold Cold Hearts
- B-side: "Any Resemblance..."
- Released: May 1996
- Recorded: October 1995
- Genre: Punk rock
- Label: Kill Rock Stars

"Yer So Sweet" is a single by Cold Cold Hearts, released in 1996 as their only 7" through Kill Rock Stars.

== Track listing ==
1. Yer So Sweet (Baby Donut)
2. Broken Teeth
3. Any Resemblance to Persons Living or Dead is Purely Coincidental
