= Chris Appelgren =

American music executive

Chris Appelgren, also known as Chris Applecore, is an American record executive, illustrator, and musician who served owner and president of Lookout! Records from 1997 when label founder Larry Livermore and partner Patrick Hynes retired, until 2012 when the label folded due to financial troubles and non-payment of royalties. In addition, Appelgren has created original artwork and album designs for many punk bands including Blatz, Green Day, Screeching Weasel, The Queers, The Donnas, and Ted Leo and the Pharmacists.

Appelgren also performed as vocalist in bands The Pattern, The PeeChees and Bumblescrump and was the original drummer for The Potatomen as well as drumming for The Lefties.
