= Teen Beat =

American magazine

- Categories: Teen, celebrity, music
- Frequency: Quarterly
- Circulation: 132,000 (Dec. 1992); 90,000 (Dec. 1993)
- Publisher: Michael Liben (1985)
- First issue: August 1967
- Final issue: c. 2007
- Company: Sterling's Magazines (1967–c. 1985); Macfadden Publications (c. 1985–1998); Primedia (now Rent Group) (1998–c. 2007)
- Country: United States
- Language: English

Teen Beat is an American magazine geared towards teenaged readers, published 1967–c. 2007.

Over its history, the magazine had multiple teen idols on its cover, including John Travolta, David Cassidy, Leif Garrett, Menudo, Michael J. Fox, Debbie Gibson, the Coreys (Feldman and Haim), Molly Ringwald, Tom Cruise, New Kids on the Block, Jonathan Taylor Thomas, Devon Sawa, Jonathan Brandis, and more recently, Hanson, Ricky Martin, Leonardo DiCaprio, Backstreet Boys, *NSYNC, Hilary Duff, Michael Jackson, Raven-Symoné, Lindsay Lohan, and many others.

== Publication history ==
First published in August 1967, the magazine was preceded by sister publications 16 Magazine, which debuted in 1956, and Tiger Beat, which was first published in 1965.

Teen Beat was published by Sterling's Magazines from 1967–c. 1985, including a period when it was part of Sterling's Ideal Publishing Company. (Sterling's also published Metal Edge, Metal Maniacs, Country Music Special, and others.) In the mid-1980s, Sterling's 'Ideal teen magazines' Teen Beat, Tiger Beat, Super Teen and Super Teen's Loudmouth were acquired by Macfadden Publications. In 1985 Michael Liben was the publisher of Teen Beat.

The mid-1990s saw a slump in the overall teen magazine market. In 1998, the conglomerate's line of youth music publications was sold off to Primedia (now Rent Group). In 2001, after publishing up to twelve magazines each year, Primedia decided to reduce its number of publications to only four magazines per year, deciding to keep 16, Tiger Beat, Teen Beat, and BOP Magazine. In October 2001 the frequency of Teen Beat switched to quarterly.

Teen Beat ceased publishing c. 2007.
