= Rachel Carns =

American drummer

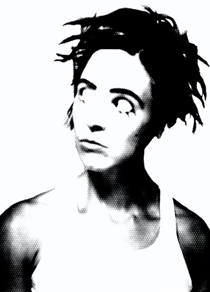
- Rachel Carns (circa 1999)

Background information
- Born: August 13, 1969 (age 57)
- Genres: Art rock, post-punk, stoner-prog
- Occupations: Musician, designer
- Instruments: Drums, organ, vocals
- Years active: 1990–present
- Labels: Troubleman Unlimited, Kill Rock Stars, K, Chainsaw

Rachel Carns (born August 13, 1969) is an American musician, composer, artist and performer living in Olympia, Washington, U.S. Raised in small-town Wisconsin, she went on to study painting and drawing at Cooper Union for the Advancement of Science and Art in New York City, where she completed her B.F.A. in 1991. Carns began her career as drummer for Kicking Giant, later collaborating with several bands, including The Need. She is a celebrated graphic designer, working under the name System Lux, and plays drums and percussion with experimental performance art group Cloud Eye Control.

== Kicking Giant ==
Carns' first band was Kicking Giant with fellow Cooper Union student Tae Won Yu, with whom she played drums and sang from 1990–1995. Their first show was in the storefront window of a Brooklyn junk shop; Carns stood up and played just one drum, a floor tom. Kicking Giant played around New York City and the northeast with bands like Codeine, Uncle Wiggly, and fellow "love-rockers" Sleepyhead; Carns continued to expand her stand-up kit, building around the central floor tom, anchor to Yu's whirling guitar and bedrock of their unique sound. Live, their largely improvised mash of punk, free jazz, sugar-candy pop, and pure poetry meant that Kicking Giant never played the same set, or even the same song, twice. Photographer Robert Frank filmed some live Kicking Giant shows; Carns later appeared in his film Last Supper (1992) along with Taylor Mead, Zohra Lampert, and Chemical Imbalance magazine's Mike McGonigal. While in New York, Kicking Giant recorded songs on Yu's 4-track and released a number of homemade cassettes (including songs recorded with Kramer); circulating bootlegs soon garnered the band a fierce cult following, particularly in England and Japan. Through the underground fanzine network, Yu became penpals with Liz Phair and members of Bratmobile, trading tapes and letters and zines and introducing the band to Riot Grrrl, a movement that merged Do It Yourself culture and feminism. In the summer of 1991 Kicking Giant played the International Pop Underground Convention in Olympia with bands like Bikini Kill, Beat Happening, Fugazi, L7, Unwound, and Jad Fair. The energy of the northwest punk scene was infectious, and both members were ready to leave New York; the duo parted ways temporarily in 1992 when Yu moved to Olympia and Carns to Washington, D.C.

In DC, Carns briefly joined Slant 6 as drummer; in fall 1992 they toured the US with The Nation of Ulysses, including a stopover in Olympia. She recorded only one song with the band ("Alien Movie Star") before moving to Olympia to rejoin Yu and Kicking Giant. During the next three years she also performed and recorded with Sue P. Fox, The Fakes, The Pet Stains, and in the notorious three-drummer line-up of Witchypoo. In the meantime, Kicking Giant released another full-length album and toured the west coast with Sue P. Fox, Tattle Tale, and Nikki McClure, the east coast with Versus, and later with Team Dresch and the Free to Fight tour. Around this time, Carns was interviewed for She's Real, Worse Than Queer, a seminal documentary film about the mid-1990s queer punk subculture. She was also filmed by G. B. Jones for a new film, The Lollipop Generation, released April 3, 2008.

== The Need ==
In 1995, Carns moved to Portland, Oregon to play keyboards with the all-queer all-girl CeBe Barnes Band. Pioneers in the next wave of Queercore, they toured the west coast with Sleater-Kinney, playing the Santa Barbara Girls Convention. After the band's demise in 1996, Carns continued playing drums and keyboards with CeBe singer and future filmmaker Miranda July and guitarist Shannon Tragedy (later known as Radio Sloan); they named the new line-up The Need. They toured down the coast to play the Dirtybird Queercore Festival in San Francisco, but July soon left to pursue solo endeavors and The Need (1996–2001) continued as a duo.

Carns and Sloan returned to Olympia where they joined forces with Donna Dresch's Queercore label Chainsaw Records. The Need's unsettling brand of cyborgian deconstructive art rock (and Carns' distinctive artwork) both set them apart and ensured their versatility; they played shows at venues such as DUMBA with such diverse acts as Glass Candy, Tribe 8, Fugazi, and The Ex, and toured with Le Tigre, BS 2000, and Blonde Redhead. Joe Preston joined the band briefly, playing bass and sampler. During this period Carns played drums with The Sub-Debs and later with The Spells. Carns and Sloan both briefly joined Mocket, then Two Ton Boa. With singer Nomy Lamm, the duo formed a highly theatrical surf-garage-punk drag king band called The Teenage Ho-Dads. They also dreamt up the collaborative project KaraNEEDoke, where Carns and Sloan and a rotating cast of players formed a live karaoke band for guest singers. This sense of community involvement, DIY spirit, and willingness to experiment led to the creation of The Transfused, a full-length rock opera, written with librettist Nomy Lamm. Twelve months in the making, with an original score by Carns and Sloan, a cast of 25, a full backing band, $40,000 in grassroots fundraising, months of rehearsals, and literally hundreds of volunteers, The Transfused sold out its two-week run at Olympia's Capitol Theater in summer 2000. The first-ever Ladyfest took place in Olympia a month later; Carns organized and emceed the punk cabaret-style Dude-Looks-Like-A-Lady drag show. Soon after, Sloan relocated to Los Angeles; The Need added a new bass player, Dvin Kirakosian, and for a while Carns spent alternate months in Olympia and LA. Their final album, prophetically titled The Need Is Dead, had been released in 2000; the band broke up within a year.

== The King Cobra/TWIN ==
In the meantime, Carns collaborated with future bandmate Kwo (later known as Ghost) to write an original score for the punk performance art cabaret Dr. Frockrocket's Vivifying (Re-Animatronic) Menagerie And Medicine Show. Carns played organ and Kwo played guitar; they were joined in the pit by Jeri Lynn Beard (drums) and Nora Danielson (violin). The show, starring Jody Bleyle, Bridget Irish, Tara Jepsen, Beth Lisick, Nomy Lamm, Inga Muscio, Beth Stinson, and Spider, toured the west coast and was featured at Boston's 2001 Out On the Edge queer theater festival.

After Frockrocket, Carns returned to the drums and headset mic, and she and Ghost continued to write and perform under the name The King Cobra. One of their earliest shows was at the first-ever Homo A Go Go festival in Olympia in 2002; the duo went on to play west coast shows with bands like Young People, The Gossip, and V For Vendetta. Soon after, Tara Jane O'Neil joined on bass; as a trio, The King Cobra released an EP on Troubleman Unlimited, and toured the west coast with Erase Errata and Shoplifting, east coast with The Quails, and the U.S. with Tracy + the Plastics. In 2004, TJO moved to Portland and The King Cobra became a duo once more. They self-released a 3" mini-CD and continued touring extensively, playing shows with Wikkid, The Planet The, Lezzies On X, Experimental Dental School, and Thrones, among others. In mid-2006 The King Cobra changed their band name to TWIN.

== Cloud Eye Control ==
In 2009, Transfused alumni Anna Oxygen commissioned Carns and ex-bandmate Radio Sloan to compose an overture for Under Polaris, a multimedia performance art piece by experimental theater group Cloud Eye Control, and eventually to join the live band, with Carns playing electronic drums, glockenspiel, doumbek, and conga. Under Polaris sold out a five-day run at REDCAT in Los Angeles, and was featured at the 2009 National Performers Network conference in Knoxville, Tennessee. In 2010 the show will travel to the Exit Festival in Paris, and the Fusebox Festival in Austin, Texas.

== Magic Kombucha ==
In 2006, Carns began homebrewing kombucha using Olympia's artesian well water. Friends and houseguests loved it, and in 2007 she began bottling commercially under the name Magic Kombucha, and is selling wholesale to local restaurants and stores.

== Personal life ==
Carns battled breast cancer in 2009, was cancer free for 17 years, before getting re-diagnosed in 2026. Carns is openly lesbian.

== Discography ==
=== With Kicking Giant ===
==== Singles ====
- She's Real 7-inch (K Records, 1994)

==== Albums ====
- Boyfriend/Girlfriend cassette (Loose Leaf, 1990)
- Secret Teenage Summer cassette (Loose Leaf, 1991]
- Present cassette (Loose Leaf, 1992)
- Hotbox cassette split w/ Long Hind Legs (Punk In My Vitamins, 1993)
- Halo cassette/CD (Spartadisc, 1993)
- Alien i.D. CD/LP (K Records, 1994)

==== Compilations ====
- Chemical Imbalance magazine Vol. 2 No. 3, 7-inch flexi (1991) -- "Rapid C", "Background, Moving Quickly"
- Soluble Fish CD (Homestead Records, 1991) -- "Songbird"
- Chinny-Chin-Chin: 4 Bands from New York City CD (Shimmy Disc, 1991) -- "Love Child", "House Dress", "I Don't Mind", White Babies", "That Summer Feeling", "Oh Yeah"
- Kill Rock Stars CD/LP (Kill Rock Stars, 1991) -- "Make You Come"
- International Pop Underground Convention CD/LP (K Records, 1994) -- "This Sex"
- Throw CD/LP (Yoyo Recordings, 1992) -- "Fuck The Rules"
- Julep CD/LP (Yoyo Recordings, 1993) -- "Lucky"
- Yo Yo A Go Go 94 CD/LP (Yoyo Recordings, 1994) -- "Blonde's Blonde"
- Half Cocked soundtrack LP (Matador, 1994) -- "Satellite"
- Project Echo CD/LP (K Records, 1995) -- "She's Real"
- Ear of the Dragon CD (Fortune 4, 1995) -- "Live It For Yourself"

==== Television ====
- Uncle Floyd Show (Newark, New Jersey, 1991)

=== With The Need ===
==== Singles ====
- The Need 7-inch (Kill Rock Stars, 1997)
- Jacky O'Lantern 7-inch (Outpunk, 1997)
- KaraNEEDoke Mailorder Freak Singles Club double 7-inch (Kill Rock Stars, 1998)

==== Albums ====
- The Need s/t CD (Chainsaw, 1997)
- The Need with Joe Preston and DJ Zena 10-inch (Up Records, 1998)
- The Need Is Dead (Chainsaw, 2000)
- The Transfused—The Need with Nomy Lamm CD (Yoyo Recordings, 2000)

==== Compilations ====
- Destination compilation (Ross Records, 1996) -- "Sam"
- Yoyo A Go Go 97 LP/CD (Yoyo Recordings, 1998) -- "Crown" (live)
- La Foresta Della Morte soundtrack CD (Toyo Records, 1999) -- "Talk Potty"
- New Women's Music Sampler CD (Mr. Lady Records, 1999) -- "Girl Flavour Gum"
- Homocore Minneapolis: Live And Loud CD (Lefty Records, 1999) -- "Vaselina", "Crown", "Majesty" (live)
- Projector LP (Yoyo Recordings, 1999) -- "American Woman"
- Yoyo A Go Go 99 LP/CD (Yoyo Recordings, 2000) -- "Dark Sally" (live)
- Group (motion picture soundtrack) CD (Yoyo Recordings/Wovie, 2000) -- "Mona Tinsley", "2-Story Girl"
- Charm (motion picture soundtrack) CD (5 Rue Christine, 2000) -- "Jolly Roger"
- Up Next CD (Up Records, 2000) -- "Talk Potty"
- The Structure of Scientific Misconceptions/The System of Scientific Misconstructions CD (Toyo Records, 2001) -- "Resurrection", "The Green Manalishi With The Two Pronged Crown"
- Home Alive Compilation Vol. 2: Flying Side Kick CD (Broken Rekids, 2001) -- "Frayed Ends Of Sanity"
- Random Slice of Life from Fort Thunder – Some Bands Who Played at CD (Contact Records, 2001) -- "2-Story Girl"

=== With The King Cobra ===
==== Singles ====
- Roi! 3" mini CD (Yr Highness, 2004)

==== Albums ====
- The King Cobra 8-song Punkass CD CD (Yr Highness, 2003)
- The King Cobra s/t EP (Troubleman Unlimited, 2004)

==== Compilations ====
- Tracks And Fields (Kill Rock Stars, 2004) -- "This Town Ain't Big Enough"

=== With TWIN ===
- TWIN b/w Shearing Pinx split c20 (Isolated Now Waves, 2006)
- TWIN b/w Mikaela's Fiend split 10-inch (SAF Records, 2007)
- TWIN b/w Gay Beast split 7-inch (Unfixed Forms + SAF Records, 2007)

=== With various ===
- Slant 6 -- "Alien Movie Star" Julep compilation CD/LP (Yoyo Recordings, 1993) drums, vocals
- Nikki and Rachel -- "No More" Julep compilation CD/LP (Yoyo Recordings, 1993) drums
- Sue P. Fox: Light A Match, Spark A Life cassette (Kill Rock Stars, 1993) drums
- Sue P. Fox: Light Matches, Spark Lives CD (Kill Rock Stars, 1994) drums
- Sue P. Fox -- "Killing Your Clone Is Still Murder" Free to Fight CD (Candy Ass/Chainsaw, 1994) drums, vocals
- Kickstand s/t CD (Queenie Records, 1994) vocals
- The Fakes: Real Fiction CD/LP (Chainsaw, 1994) drums, vocals
- CeBe Barnes Band -- "You Use Me For Fashion" b/w "She's A Winner" 7-inch (Horsekitty, 1995)
- Miranda July with The Need: Margie Ruskie Stops Time 7-inch (Kill Rock Stars, 1997) drums
- Miranda July: 10 Million Hours A Mile CD (Kill Rock Stars, 1997) -- "How's My Driving?" drums
- Sue P. Fox: Mailorder Freak Singles Club 7-inch (Kill Rock Stars, 1998) drums
- Internal/External: Featuring... (K Records, 1998) -- "Candystriper" vocals
- Mocket: Pro Forma (Kill Rock Stars, 1998) drums, vocals
- The Spells (unreleased, 1999) drums
- Two Ton Boa s/t EP (Kill Rock Stars, 2000) -- "Have Mercy" drums
- Tara Jane O'Neil: You Sound, Reflect (Quarterstick, 2004) piano
- Tracy + the Plastics: Culture For Pigeon (Troubleman Unlimited, 2005) sampled drums
- Scream Club: Don't Bite Your Sister (Tiny Sensational, 2004) sampled drums

=== Films ===
- The Last Supper (dir. Robert Frank, 1992)
- The Lollipop Generation (dir. G. B. Jones, 2008)
- She's Real, Worse Than Queer (dir. Lucy Thane, 1997)
