= Furthermore (Team Dresch album) =

Studio album by Team Dresch
- Released: September 18, 2026
- Recorded: October 2025; March 2026
- Studio: Peacedale (Bristol, Connecticut)
- Length: 38:12
- Label: Jealous Butcher
- Producers: Greg Griffith; Team Dresch

Team Dresch chronology
Choices, Chances, Changes: Singles & Comptracks 1994–2000 (2020)	Furthermore (2026)

Singles from Furthermore
- 1. "One Song" Released: June 22, 2026; 2. "Growing Underground" Released: August 7, 2026

Professional ratings
Review scores
Source	Rating
AllMusic	4/5 stars
Musikexpress	5/6 stars
Rolling Stone Germany	3.5/5 stars

Furthermore is the third studio album by American punk rock band Team Dresch, released on September 18, 2026, through Jealous Butcher Records. It is the band's first album in 30 years, following the release of Captain My Captain (1996).

== Track listing ==
No.	Title	Length
1.	"One Song"	3:05
2.	"Growing Underground"	3:56
3.	"Heard a Bang"	2:57
4.	"Jamie"	3:09
5.	"I've Really Become Some Thing"	4:18
6.	"Still Your Room"	3:02
7.	"And Now Your Face"	3:09
8.	"(Where Do) I Belong"	2:16
9.	"I Won't Tell"	3:20
10.	"Every Owl Leaves"	2:52
11.	"Last One at the Party"	2:32
12.	"Protectors"	3:36
Total length:		38:12

== Personnel ==
Credits are adapted from Bandcamp and Tidal.

Team Dresch
- Kaia Wilson - guitar, vocals
- Jody Blyele - guitar, vocals
- Donna Dresch - bass, vocals
- Marcéo Martinez - drums
- Melissa York - drums

Additional personnel

- Greg Griffith - lead guitar (3), additional guitar (6)

Production
- Greg Griffith - production, engineering
- Team Dresch - co-production
- Cory Grey - additional recording (2, 10)
- John Goodmanson - mixing
- Rachel Field - mastering

Artwork

- Melissa York - design, layout
- Kaia Wilson - cover photo (at Once Ballroom)
- Becca Albee - cover photo editing
- Dale Biddle - back cover photo (at Capitol Theater)
- Alix Meymarian Kolar - insert photo
- Jason Quigley - live photo
