= Choices, Chances, Changes: Singles & Comptracks 1994–2000 =

Compilation album by Team Dresch
- Released: May 31, 2019
- Studios: Avast! Recording Co.; Capitol Theater, Olympia; The Hive Creative Labs; Live Transmission; Yo-yo Studio
- Genre: Riot grrrl
- Length: 30:37
- Language: English
- Label: Jealous Butcher Records

Team Dresch chronology
Captain My Captain (1996)	Choices, Chances, Changes: Singles & Comptracks 1994–2000 (2019)	Furthermore (2026)

Choices, Chances, Changes: Singles & Comptracks 1994–2000 is a 2019 compilation album from American riot grrrl band Team Dresch.

== Reception ==
This compilation was released alongside reissues of the band's two studio albums and N. M. Mashurov reviewed all three for Pitchfork Media, writing that this album "feels like a promo CD you might get at a punk fest and end up treasuring" and the album was rated an 8.6 out of 10.

== Track listing ==
1. "My Voice" (Jody Bleyle and Kaia Wilson) – 2:32 (from the compilation Shiner on Slo-mo)
2. "Hand Grenade" (Bleyle and Wilson) – 3:23 (from the "Hand Grenade" 7" on Kill Rock Stars)
3. "Endtime Relay" (Bleyle and Wilson) – 2:40 (from the "Hand Grenade" 7" on Kill Rock Stars)
4. "Molasses in January" (Bleyle and Wilson) – 4:27 (from the "Hand Grenade" 7" on Kill Rock Stars)
5. "Seven" (Bleyle and Wilson) – 1:48 (from the compilation Rock Stars Kill on Kill Rock Stars)
6. "Fake Fight" (Yoyo version) (Bleyle and Wilson) – 3:06 (from the compilation Periscope: Another Yoyo Compilation on Yoyo Recordings)
7. "Song for Anne Bannon" (Bleyle, Marceo Martinez, and Wilson) – 1:30 (from the compilation Free to Fight! Self Defense for Women and Girls compilation on Candy-Ass Records)
8. "What Can a Lover Do?" (Bleyle and Martinez) – 1:59 (from a split 7" that featured The Dahlia Seed, F-80, and Shove on Marigold Records)
9. "It's a Conversation" (Bleyle and Martinez) – 2:15 (from the Team Dresch / Longstocking split 7" on Sub Pop)
10. "Deattached" (Bleyle and Martinez) – 2:13 (from The New Team Dresch V 6.0 Beta 7" on Outpunk)
11. "Venus Lacy" (Bleyle and Martinez) – 2:14 (from The New Team Dresch V 6.0 Beta 7" on Outpunk)
12. "Temporary Insurance" (Bleyle and Martinez) – 2:31 (from the Team Dresch / The Automaticans split 7" on Mental Monkey)

== Personnel ==
Team Dresch

- Jody Bleyle – bass guitar on "My Voice", "Hand Grenade", "Deattached", "Venus Lacy", and "Temporary Insurance"; drums on "My Voice", "Endtime Relay", and Seven"; backing vocals on "My Voice", "Endtime Relay", and Seven"; guitar on "Molasses in January", "Fake Fight" (Yoyo Version), "Song for Anne Bannon", and "It's a Conversation"; vocals on "Molasses in January", "Fake Fight" (Yoyo Version), "Song for Anne Bannon", "It's a Conversation", "Deattached", "Venus Lacy", and "Temporary Insurance"; design; layout
- Donna Dresch – bass guitar on "Endtime Relay", "Molasses in January", "Fake Fight" (Yoyo Version), and "Song for Anne Bannon"; guitar on "It's a Conversation", "Deattached", "Venus Lacy", and "Temporary Insurance"; lead guitar on "Hand Grenade"; design; layout
- Amanda Kelley – guitar on "Deattached" and "Venus Lacy", design, layout
- Marceo Martinez – drums on "Song for Anne Bannon", "It's a Conversation", and "Temporary Insurance"; guitar on "Temporary Insurance"; vocals on "Deattached" and "Venus Lacy"; backing vocals on "It's a Conversation"; design; layout
- Kaia Wilson – guitar on "My Voice", "Hand Grenade", "Endtime Relay", "Molasses in January", "Seven", "Fake Fight" (Yoyo Version), and "Song for Anne Bannon"; vocals on "My Voice", "Hand Grenade", "Endtime Relay", "Molasses in January", "Seven", "Fake Fight" (Yoyo Version), and "Song for Anne Bannon"; design; layout

Additional personnel

- Neilson Abeel – photography
- Tammy Rae Carland – photography
- Curt Doughty –photography
- Andrew Earles – liner notes
- Erik Gamlem – photography
- Antonia Gogin – engineering on "What Can a Lover Do"
- Adam Gonsalves – compilation mastering
- John Goodmanson – engineering, mixing, and production on "Song for Anne Bannon", "It's a Conversation", and "Temporary Insurance"
- Robert Ham – engineering on "Deattached" and "Venus Legacy"
- Rob Jones – design, layout
- La Pussygata, Inc. – photography
- Margarita – photography
- Pat Maley – engineering on "My Voice", "Hand Grenade", "Endtime Relay", "Molasses in January", "Seven", and "Fake Fight" (Yoyo Version)
- Scott Plouf – drums on "My Voice", "Hand Grenade", "Molasses in January", and "Fake Fight" (Yoyo Version)
- Tamala Poljak – bass guitar on "It's a Conversation", backing vocals on "It's a Conversation"
- Elisa Shebaro – photography
- Corin Tucker – liner notes
- Alice Wheeler – photography

== See also ==
- List of 2019 albums
