= Excuse Seventeen =

Studio album by Excuse 17
- Released: 1994
- Genre: Punk rock
- Length: 30:09
- Label: Atlas Records, Chainsaw Records

Excuse 17 chronology
Excuse Seventeen (1994)	Such Friends Are Dangerous (1995)

Excuse Seventeen is the debut studio album by American punk rock band Excuse 17. It was released in 1994 on vinyl by Atlas Records and CD by Chainsaw Records.

== Critical reception ==
Professional ratings
Review scores
Source	Rating
Allmusic	3/5 stars

Jimmy Draper, reviewer of Allmusic, awarded the album 3 stars, stating that Excuse Seventeen is an "impressive debut, surging forward with a live-wire energy and stark honesty that helped make the riot grrrl scene so compelling in the first place." However, he also felt that the album can sound dated at times, with the exception of the tracks "Carson", "Imaginary Friend", "Hope You Feel Bad", and "Code Red", which were said to have "wonderfully withstood the test of time."

== Track listing ==
1. "Vanishing Act" – 3:03
2. "Two Faced" – 2:03
3. "Cut and Dry" – 2:58
4. "Hope You Feel Bad" – 2:51
5. "Despise" – 2:17
6. "Carson" – 3:19
7. "Code Red" – 2:59
8. "We're the Seniors (And We Rule the School)" – 2:42
9. "Imaginary Friend" – 2:26
10. "Groundhog's Day" – 3:28
11. "Break and Enter" – 2:03

== Personnel ==
- Becca Albee – guitar, vocals
- Carrie Brownstein – guitar, vocals
- Curtis James – drums
