= Personal Best (album) =

Studio album by Team Dresch
- Released: January 23, 1995
- Recorded: August 12–16, 1994
- Studios: Avast!, Seattle, Washington
- Genres: Punk rock, queercore
- Length: 24:14
- Labels: Candy Ass, Chainsaw
- Producers: John Goodmanson, Team Dresch

Team Dresch chronology
Hand Grenade (1994)	Personal Best (1995)	Captain My Captain (1996)

Personal Best is the first studio album by the American queercore band Team Dresch. It was released on January 23, 1995, by Candy Ass Records and Chainsaw Records. It was reissued on Jealous Butcher Records in May 2019. The label reissued their entire back catalog in order to help reaffirm the band's legacy as queercore icons.

== Recording and release ==
Personal Best was produced by John Goodmanson and the band and recorded at Avast! in Seattle, Washington, from August 12 to August 16, 1994. As the band's first album, it was released in January 1995 on the singer and guitarist Jody Bleyle's label Candy Ass Records and the bass guitarist Donna Dresch's label Chainsaw Records. The album's title and cover are a reference to the 1982 lesbian-themed film, Personal Best.

== Reception ==
Professional ratings
Review scores
Source	Rating
AllMusic	4.5/5 stars
The Great Indie Discography	8/10
NME	7/10
MusicHound Rock	4/5 stars
Ox-Fanzine	(Note: Score is shared with Captain My Captain.)
Paste	7.5/10
Pitchfork	9.1/10
Punknews.org	4/5 stars
The Village Voice	(choice cut)

Johnny Histon of Spin praised the album's LGBT lyrical themes, writing that they had never been explored before in rock music. He concluded, "Team Dresch knows that simply being itself and making great music is a political act. On Personal Best they do both."

Retrospectively, Jason Ankeny of AllMusic declared the album a "call to arms" that "explodes on contact", writing, "Of all the punk records to come out of the 1990s, Personal Best comes closest to actually recapturing the sheer passion and rage which originally spawned the movement two decades earlier". He praised how the band "never put their politics ahead of their songs — each of these ten tracks is airtight, with melodies as blistering as the lyrics". The Washington Post writer Chris Richards called Personal Best "a fiery, all-but-forgotten punk masterpiece".

In 2026 Rolling Stone placed it at 48 on their list of "The 100 Greatest Punk Albums of All Time".

== Track listing ==
1. Fagetarian and Dyke – 2:45
2. Hate the Christian Right! – 2:35
3. She's Crushing My Mind – 1:42
4. Freewheel – 1:39
5. She's Amazing – 3:03
6. Fake Fight – 3:07
7. #1 Chance Pirate TV – 3:04
8. D.A. Don't Care – 2:21
9. Growing Up in Springfield – 2:19
10. Screwing Yer Courage – 1:39

== Personnel ==
Credits are adapted from the album's liner notes.

- Donna Dresch – guitar, bass guitar
- Jody Bleyle – guitar, bass, vocals
- Kaia Wilson – guitar, vocals
- Marcéo Martinez – drums
