= Sarah Jacobson =

American film director

- Born: August 25, 1971; Norwalk, Connecticut, U.S.
- Died: February 13, 2004 (aged 32); New York City, U.S.
- Education: Edina High School, San Francisco Art Institute, Bard College
- Occupations: Film director; screenwriter; producer
- Years active: 1993–2004

Sarah Jacobson (August 25, 1971 – February 13, 2004) was an American film director, screenwriter, and producer.

== Early life ==
Jacobson was born in Connecticut, moved to New Jersey in 1975, then to Edina, Minnesota in 1982. She graduated with honors from Edina High School in Edina, Minnesota in 1989. She attended Bard College before transferring to the San Francisco Art Institute in 1991 to study film. While attending SFAI with George Kuchar as her mentor, Jacobson began making I Was a Teenage Serial Killer.

== Career ==
Jacobson's two most well-known works are I Was a Teenage Serial Killer and Mary Jane's Not a Virgin Anymore. Both were well received at film festivals across North America such as the New York Underground Film Festival, the Chicago Underground Film Festival, and Sundance. I Was a Teenage Serial Killer featured songs by Heavens to Betsy. She was listed in Spin as one of the "Top Influences on Girl Culture". Film Threat, in its Film Threat Video Guide, labeled it as one of the "25 Underground Films You Must See".

Also outspoken in their praise were film critic Roger Ebert, filmmaker Allison Anders, and Kim Gordon of Sonic Youth. Ed Halter, writing in the Village Voice, considered I Was A Teenage Serial Killer "a key film of that decade's angrily subversive underground cinema".

Jacobson's films were reviewed in such publications such as The New York Times, The Village Voice, Sight and Sound, and the Los Angeles Times. Clippings from Jacobson's personal papers, which are housed at New York University Fales Library and Special Collections, include interviews of her as well as reviews and commentary on her work from Spin, Bust, Bitch magazine, and Film Threat, among others.

Her low-budget feature film Mary Jane's Not a Virgin Anymore and the grassroots manner in which Jacobson promoted it won her recognition in her specific field. Mary Jane's Not a Virgin Anymore starred Lisa Gerstein and Beth Allen of the band The Loudmouths, whose music—along with that of Babes In Toyland and Mudhoney—is featured in the film. Jello Biafra also appears in a cameo role. Following the release of this film, Jacobson directed videos for the bands Man or Astroman and Fluffy.

With the success of her films, Jacobson was an important champion of the DIY approach to filmmaking and wrote for several publications, including Punk Planet, Grand Royal, San Francisco Bay Guardian, and Indiewire on the topic. She was a contributor to the film zine Joanie4Jackie, a project created by Miranda July to showcase women's independently made and DIY films. Jacobson was also a participant in DiY Fest, a do-it-yourself traveling film festival.

Jacobson was the author of the progressive S.T.I.G.M.A. Manifesto (Sisters Together in Girlie Movie-Making Action).

"Everyone talks about living in the post #MeToo era", said Jacobson's friend Jake Fogelnest. "Here was a woman who made films in the '90s; who was screaming about that stuff in her work and in her life before it became a fashion accessory button at a Hollywood awards ceremony".

Jacobson wrote an unproduced feature-length script titled Sleaze about “an all-girl band on tour in Missoula, Mont., who hook up with the town geek.”

== Death ==
Jacobson died from endometrial cancer in New York City on February 13, 2004, aged 32.

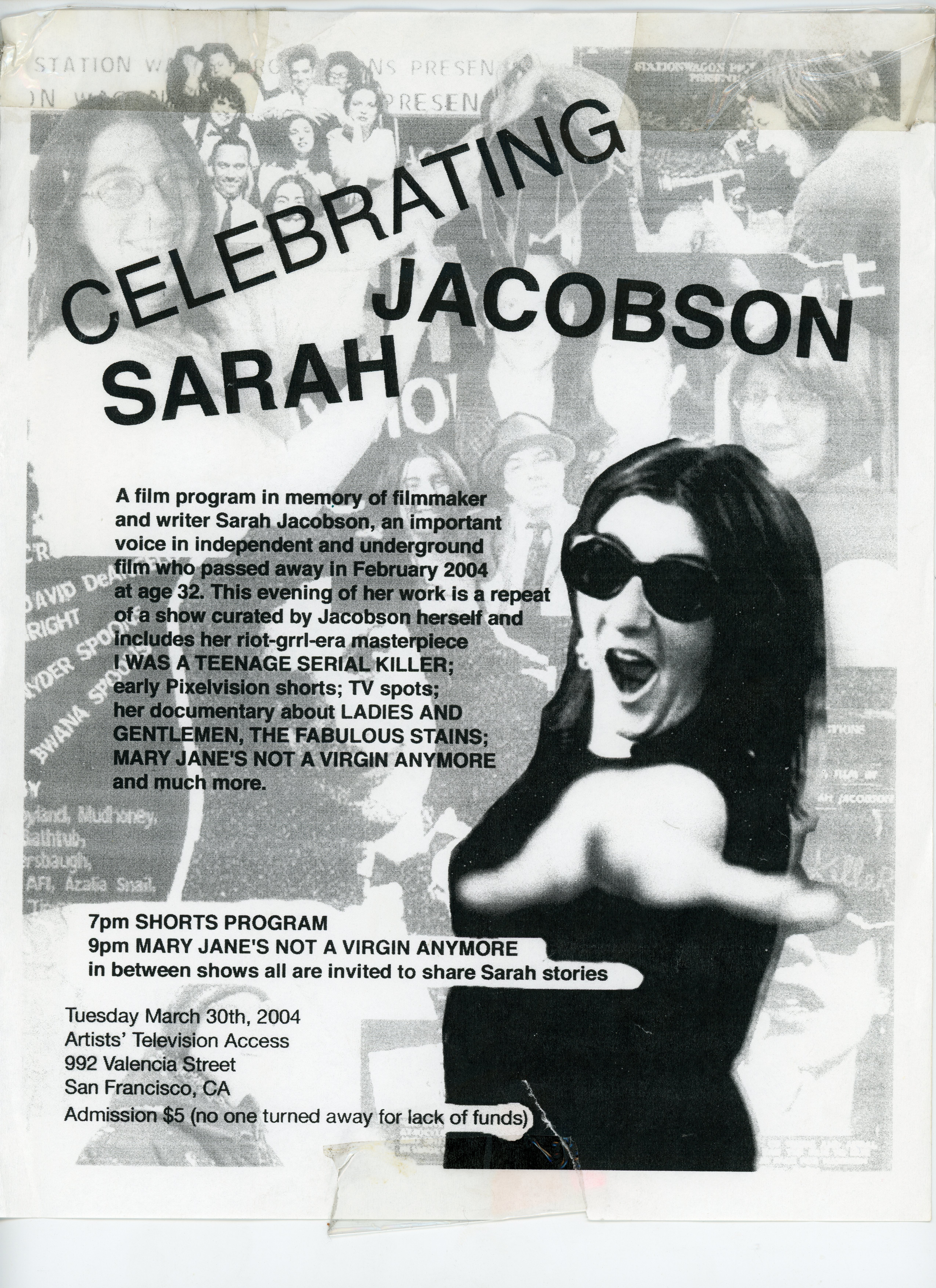
Poster promoting a memorial event for Sarah Jacobson

== Legacy ==
After her death, Marc Savlov wrote in The Austin Chronicle, "There's no doubt in the minds of anyone ... that she greatly helped stoke the flames of the guerilla and indie filmmaking movement while becoming a voice for grrrl-positive cineastes everywhere".

According to the New York Press, Jacobson is reputed to be the "Queen of Underground Cinema".

The Sarah Jacobson Film Grant was set up by Sarah’s longtime friend and collaborator filmmaker Sam Green and annually awards grants to young female and gender-nonconforming directors. The Sarah Jacobson Papers are located in the Fales Library at New York University.

A compilation of Jacobson's films was released on DVD and Blu-ray by the American Genre Film Archive on September 17, 2019.

== Filmography ==
- Sweet Miss: The Disco Years (1988)
- Road Movie (Or - What I Learned In A Buick Station Wagon) (1991)
- I Was a Teenage Serial Killer (1993)
- "Sferic Waves" - Man or Astro-man? (music video) (1996)
- Technicolor-Yawn-Fluffy (1996)
- Mary Jane's Not a Virgin Anymore (1996)
- The Making of Ladies and Gentlemen, the Fabulous Stains (2000)
- Bra Shopping (2002)
- High School Reunion (2003)
- True Love Mohawk
