= Tennessee Metal Devastation Music Fest =

Tennessee Metal Devastation Music Fest is an American music festival focused on extreme metal and heavy metal music held at The Amp in downtown Jackson, Tennessee. The event features art, handicraft, and food. It is run by Metal Devastation Promotions, LLC. The event has proven to be controversial, as some residents reportedly voiced concerns that the event "could create a Satanic environment," according to WBBJ-TV. Metal Devastation Promotions co-founder Raven Moonla said of the controversy: "There are a lot of deeply religious people in that town who feel like we are going to be opening a portal to hell, and summoning Satan, and corrupting their children, which is pretty funny because we’re all really nice people. This music is not any more evil than a horror, or a haunted house, or other things that people take their children to during Halloween season."

Most notably, American hardcore punk band Filth played in 2025.
