= Lucy Thane =

British documentary filmmaker, event producer and performer

Lucy Thane (born 1967) is a British documentary filmmaker, event producer and performer, living in Folkestone. Her films include It Changed My Life: Bikini Kill in the UK (1993) and She's Real (Worse than Queer) (1997).

== Early life and education ==
Thane was born in north London. She studied history at the University of East Anglia in Norwich, then studied for a master's degree in film at the Northern Media School in Sheffield.

== Life and work ==
From 1994 to 1998 she lived in San Francisco, where she worked as a curator and editor at Artists' Television Access and taught at the Academy of Art College. She returned to London in 1998.

For It Changed My Life: Bikini Kill in the UK (1993) she followed the 1990s riot grrrl band Bikini Kill while they were on tour in the UK with Huggy Bear. The film includes contributions from other UK queer and feminist bands of the time: the Raincoats, Skinned Teen and Sister George. It premiered in 1993 at The Kitchen in New York City. "Thane's complete footage has been digitized and is held at the Fales Library & Special Collections as part of the Fales Riot Grrrl Collection" at New York University. Thane's footage was used in the documentary film The Punk Singer (2013) by Sini Anderson.

She's Real (Worse than Queer) (1997) is a document of the riot grrrl and queercore scene in the 1990s. The film has been screened at film festivals, written about in academic books and included in the curriculum of a number of university courses. The film includes interviews with musicians, film directors and zine makers such as Phranc, Lynn Breedlove, Leslie Mah, Radio Sloan, Rachel Carns, G.B. Jones, Donna Dresch and Jody Bleyle, who discusses her independent label Candy Ass Records and the release of the double album compilation Free To Fight. The film also includes excerpts from the films The Yo-Yo Gang by G.B. Jones and Lady Outlaws and Faggot Wannabes by Tammy Rae Carland as well as live performances by the bands CeeBee Barns Band, Cheesecake, Cypher In The Snow, Fifth Column, Sister George, Sta-Prest, Team Dresch, Third Sex, and Tribe 8.

== Filmography ==
- It Changed My Life: Bikini Kill in the U.K. (1993) – 25 mins
- She's Real (Worse than Queer) (1997)
- As Is Your Due (1999)
- Breaking the Boundaries (2001)
- The Experimental Playground (2004)
- The Pool of London (2006)
- Creatures (2007)
- Laga Beach (2010)
- Playa Shows Me the Way Home
