= The Bluff (album) =

Studio album by Sarah Dougher
- Released: 2001
- Genre: Rock
- Length: 40:20
- Label: Mr. Lady

Sarah Dougher chronology
The Walls Ablaze (2000)	The Bluff (2001)	Harper's Arrow (2005)

The Bluff is an album by the American musician Sarah Dougher, released in 2001. Dougher supported it with North American and Australian tours.

== Production ==
Dougher and Jon Nikki played most of the instruments on The Bluff. Janet Weiss drummed on several of the tracks. Dougher's Cadallaca bandmate Corin Tucker contributed backing vocals to "Must Believe"; the album is dedicated to her son. "It's Raining" is a cover of the Allen Toussaint song made famous by Irma Thomas.

== Critical reception ==
Professional ratings
Review scores
Source	Rating
AllMusic	3/5 stars
Pitchfork	7.4/10
Spin	8/10

Greil Marcus, in The New York Times, wrote: "On The Walls Ablaze, Ms. Dougher's voice was tensed, armored; that was a source of its force. But it was a force used as a weapon, for a purpose, and as it focused the songs it also narrowed them. Here Ms. Dougher relaxes into her own, physical sound, and the music becomes less specific, less purposeful—less about her." The Oregonian labeled The Bluff "13 defiantly simple compositions of guitar, organ and drums, overlaid with Dougher's signature alto." The Orange County Register noted "the bruising of heartbreak stripped bare for microscopic examination, while soothing, catchy melodies emanate from the lab next door."

The Washington Post concluded that "the highlight is the psychedelic-folk-rock title song, a game-of-love reminiscence with a lilting refrain." The Village Voice said that, "befitting an academic who moonlights as a rock 'n' roller, Dougher's songs are finely wrought, with pop-classicist melodies even more eloquent than their extended metaphors." Pitchfork determined that The Bluff "is an easy album to digest, cleaner, more cautious, and less raw than Dougher's previous, The Walls Ablaze... The edge primarily exists in the contrast between Dougher's earthy, plaintive vocal quality and the tidy lines in the songs." The Austin American-Statesman and Riverfront Times listed The Bluff among the best albums of 2001.

AllMusic praised the "deeply bare, honest, and piercing ruminations on the struggle to balance intellect and emotion and finding hope and healing amid love's losses."

== Track listing ==
No.	Title	Length
1.	"First Dream"	2:42
2.	"Must Believe"	2:12
3.	"Little Thing"	3:59
4.	"Wide Eyed"	2:09
5.	"The Bluff"	6:28
6.	"Keep Me"	3:36
7.	"My Kingdom"	2:48
8.	"Turn Myself"	2:50
9.	"System Works"	2:34
10.	"The Homecoming"	3:01
11.	"It's Raining"	2:08
12.	"Fall Down"	3:09
13.	"The Choice"	2:44
Total length:		40:20
