= Furthermore =

Furthermore may refer to:

- Furthermore (Ralph Moore album), 1990
- Furthermore (Team Dresch album), 2026
