= Such Friends Are Dangerous =

Studio album by Excuse 17
- Released: April 24, 1995
- Genre: Queercore
- Length: 34:18
- Label: Kill Rock Stars
- Producers: John Goodmanson, Excuse 17

Excuse 17 chronology
Excuse Seventeen (1994)	Such Friends Are Dangerous (1995)

Such Friends Are Dangerous is the second and final studio album by American punk rock band Excuse 17, released on April 24, 1995 by Kill Rock Stars. The album received generally positive reviews from music critics.

== Critical reception ==
Professional ratings
Review scores
Source	Rating
AllMusic	4/5 stars
Robert Christgau	(1-star Honorable Mention)

Such Friends Are Dangerous received generally positive reviews. Jimmy Draper of AllMusic said that the album is "full of violently emotional catharsis", citing the songs "This Is Not Your Wedding Song" and "The Drop Dead Look" as the "startling centerpieces." Prominent music critic Robert Christgau gave the album a 1 star honorable mention, commenting "Carrie Brownstein finds her scream." J. Neo of Puncture praised the vocal interplay between Becca Albee and Brownstein, stating that "the way they trade lines and finish each other's songs is electrifying."

== Track listing ==
1. "5 Acres" – 2:03
2. "Forever Fired" – 3:14
3. "Watchmaker" – 3:08
4. "I'd Rather Eat Glass" – 2:56
5. "Deactur H.S." – 2:20
6. "This Is Not Your Wedding Song" – 4:28
7. "The Drop Dead Look" – 1:47
8. "Designated Shotgun" – 2:28
9. "Getoff" – 2:34
10. "Nervousness Never Fades" – 2:27
11. "Special Guest, Me" – 2:10
12. "Framed" – 2:14
13. "She Wants 3-D" – 2:29

== Personnel ==
- Becca Albee (vocals, guitar)
- Carrie Brownstein (guitar, vocals)
- Curtis James (drums)
