= The Walls Ablaze =

Studio album by Sarah Dougher
- Released: May 16, 2000
- Studio: Jackpot!, Portland, OR
- Genre: Pop rock, folk, indie pop
- Label: Mr. Lady
- Producer: Larry Crane, Sarah Dougher

Sarah Dougher chronology
Day One (1999)	The Walls Ablaze (2000)	The Bluff (2001)

The Walls Ablaze is the second album by the American musician Sarah Dougher, released on May 16, 2000. She supported it with a North American tour.

== Production ==
Dougher was backed by Hannah Billie and Janet Weiss on drums and Jon Reuter on guitar. Many of the songs are about relationships, aloneness, and the inability of people to change. "The New Carissa" uses the story of the grounded freighter New Carissa to describe a fractured romantic connection. "Mirror/Shield" is about women who in various capacities perform to earn a living. The title track was inspired by Dougher's studies of the Fall of Troy; Dougher had taught Greek and Roman literature at the collegiate level.

== Critical reception ==
Professional ratings
Review scores
Source	Rating
AllMusic	4/5 stars
The Boston Phoenix	3/4 stars
Entertainment Weekly	C
Press and Sun-Bulletin	B+

CMJ New Music Report called the album "a fertile collection of folkloric wordplay and personal introspection." The Washington Post said that it was "catchy if conventional pop-rock" and noted that Dougher "sings of love, loss and the like in a style that recalls both '60s folk-rockers and '70s singer-songwriters." The Morning Call noted that Dougher "tends to over-articulate, pushing the loud points of each melody to the limit and sounding strangely self-conscious in the process." The Press and Sun-Bulletin praised Dougher's "dry, subtle and sharp" folky humor.

Greil Marcus, in The New York Times, labeled The Walls Ablaze "as impassioned an album as anyone released" in 2000. The Boston Phoenix deemed it "sinewy Matadorian indie pop". AllMusic stated, "Dougher's melodic vocals can be linked to Bettie Serveert's Carol van Dijk, and the Spinanes' Rebecca Gates, and instrumentation echoes like early Lene Lovich cuts." The Bay Area Reporter listed The Walls Ablaze as the sixth best album of 2000, tied with Capable Egg.

== Track listing ==
No.	Title	Length
1.	"The Walls Ablaze"
2.	"No-Handed"
3.	"The Scales"
4.	"The New Carissa"
5.	"What She'd Trade"
6.	"The Ground Below"
7.	"Mirror/Shield"
8.	"She Stood Up"
9.	"What's Good Is Better Than Gone"
10.	"The Old Way"
11.	"The Flag"
12.	"The Match"
