= Free to Fight =

Compilation album by various artists
- Released: 1995
- Recorded: ?
- Genre: Punk rock • alternative rock • indie • lo-fi • spoken word • riot grrrl (reference is from discogs)
- Label: Candy Ass Records Chainsaw Records

Free to Fight is a project consisting of a 1995 double album and booklet, and a single later released by Candy Ass Records.

The release is subtitled "an interactive self-defense project." The theme of the project is self-defense for women, and it includes records featuring all-women bands and a 75-page booklet with writings, comics, and graphics by Cynthia Star, Rachel Hanes, Julia Toews, Robin V. Bowser, Nina Landey, Maria Mercedes, bell hooks, Roberta Gregory, Penny Van Horn, Kirsten Ostherr, Laura Sister Nobody, Rachel, Jeannie La France, Alice Stagg, Moira Bowman, Alicia Cohen, Christine Denkewalter, Margaret Denkelwalter, Ellen Crofts, Shannon, Jo, Sara Stout, Lisa Addario, Lake, Bridget Irish, Nikki McClure, Stella Marrs, Staci Colter, Jody Bleyle and Anna LoBianco. The recordings also include self-defense instructions and personal testimonies.

It was released as a double album, on two 12" vinyl records, and also released simultaneously as a CD.

The recording was spotlighted in the 1997 documentary film She's Real by Lucy Thane, which featured interviews with Candy Ass Records owner Jody Bleyle about the inspiration behind Free To Fight, as well as the practical aspects of releasing it.

This project was continued as a 7-inch split single with Sleater-Kinney and Cypher in the Snow, also on Candy Ass Records, released in 1998.

== Track listing ==
=== Record one ===
1. "Sarah Rides the Greyhound"
2. The Third Sex – "Monster Snack"
3. "Definition of Self Defense"
4. Team Dresch – "Song for Anne Bannon"
5. Mizzery - "Sleep'n Wit' the Enemy"
6. "Violence Is Violence"
7. Sue P. Fox (with Rachel Carns) - "Killing Your Clone Is Still Murder"
8. Rebecca Gates – "Carnation Red"
9. "Body Language"
10. Fifth Column – "Don't"
11. "Yelling"
12. 151 - "Real Defense"
13. "Make a Scene"
14. Containe - "The Martyr"
15. "Assertiveness Practice"
16. Nikki, Jen, Rueben - "New Terror Story"

=== Record two ===
1. The Lois (Lois) - "St. What's Her Name"
2. "Alice's Story"
3. "Primary Targets"
4. "Target Practice"
5. "Striking"
6. Cheesecake - "Disgracias"
7. "Laura Sister Nobody Crosses the Street"
8. Axteca X - "Daddy's Crazy"
9. Heavens to Betsy – "Get Out of My Head"
10. "Sylvia Gets Crazy"
11. Excuse 17 – "Forever Fired"
12. Nikki McClure – "Lucky One"
