= Mary Jane's Not a Virgin Anymore =

1997 film by Sarah Jacobson

- Film poster
- Directed by: Sarah Jacobson
- Written by: Sarah Jacobson
- Produced by: Sarah Jacobson
- Starring: Lisa Gerstein; Beth Ramona Allen
- Cinematography: Adam Dodds
- Edited by: Sarah Jacobson
- Music by: The Loudmouths; Babes in Toyland; Mudhoney; Red Aunts; AFI; The Cosmic Psychos
- Distributed by: Station Wagon Productions
- Release dates: August 14, 1996 (Chicago); March 22, 1998 (United States)
- Running time: 95 minutes
- Country: United States
- Language: English
- Budget: $50,000

Mary Jane's Not a Virgin Anymore is a 1996 independent film written, directed, and produced by the self-anointed "Queen of Underground Film", Sarah Jacobson. It's a film about a teenage girl in the Twin Cities area named Mary Jane who is curious about sex. It focuses on the female perspective of sex. In the film, musicians Jello Biafra and Davey Havok appear in cameo roles. Tamra Davis helped finance the film. It was shown at a sold-out screening at the Sundance Film Festival in 1997.

== Plot ==
The film starts with a recreation of an overly glamorized 'Hollywood' vision of a girl losing her virginity. This is juxtaposed with high schooler Mary Jane losing her virginity to Steve which is shown to be uncomfortable and not at all glamorous. Mid-coitus, Jane requests that Steve stop, and she leaves to attend a party at the local cinema at which she works. She discusses her failed date with her fellow employees, bisexual punk musician Ericka, alcoholic Matt, Ryan, who collects smiley-face memorabilia, and her understanding gay boss Dave. It's revealed that the employees have a habit of secretly placing bets on the outcomes of people's relationships and sexual activity. At the end of the night, Jane swears off both relationships and sex.

The next day, Jane is put in charge of training new employee Tom. Steve shows up to ask Jane out again, though she promptly rejects him. In the midst of work, Jane is making a video project where she interviews her friends about being residents of the fictitious country of Zamboni, where women have equal rights to men. Presenting the unedited project to her class, she's met with disapproval from her straitlaced classmates.

Jane's friends begin to open up to her about their often embarrassing first times. Her friend Grace relates that she was raped when she was 15, and consensually lost her virginity with a friend a month later. Ericka recalls having sex in a basement, with her partner whispering 'olive juice' post-coitus. Ericka suggests that Jane try masturbating to discover what she likes. Tom invites Jane to a party, after which she masturbates for the first time. Discussing it with Ericka the next day, it is revealed that Matt was Ericka's first lover.

Grace tells Jane and Ericka that she is five months pregnant, although it is soon revealed that Dave had already correctly guessed she was pregnant and placed a bet on it. That night, Tom and Jane have sex, which proves to be much more enjoyable than Jane's first time. The next morning, Jane is told that Matt has been fired for stealing from work, and that Dave will soon be leaving his job to renovate and run another theater. Matt decides to move to Alabama where he apparently has a girlfriend who can get him a job. Tom and Matt decide to go out for one final night of drinking together. The next day, Jane is told that Tom is in hospital after getting drunk and driving the wrong way down a one-way street; he soon dies of his injuries.

After Tom's funeral, Dave leaves the theater and is replaced by an abrasive and disorganized manager. Before long, both Ryan and Jane decide to quit. After spending a day together, Jane confesses that she has romantic feelings for Ryan, who tells her that, while flattered, he does not feel the same way, and wishes to remain friends.

The next year, having graduated high school, Jane moves to Boston and is a contributor to her friend's zine Olive Juice. Grace reveals that a blood test showed Tom to be the biological father of her child, which she has decided to keep. Dave is running a new theater with his lover, Kurt. While meeting with Ryan at a restaurant, Jane runs into Steve, who doesn't recognize her. Jane sees that Steve is meeting with her friend Allison, who reveals that she reads Olive Juice. Jane tells her that her first time with Steve was the basis for an article in the zine about an "awful thing that happened in the cemetery". After blowing off Steve, Allison is invited to come bowling with Jane and Ryan.

== Cast ==
- Lisa Gerstein as Mary Jane
- Chris Enright as Tom
- Greg Cruikshank as Dave
- Beth "Ramona" Allen as Ericka
- Marny Snyder Spoons as Grace
- Bwana Spoons as Ryan
- Andrew DeAngelo as Matt
- Shane Kramer as Steve
- Alicia J. Rose as Allison
- Davey Havok as George
- Miles Long as Kurt
- Siira Rieschl as Danny

== Production ==
The film was inspired by Sarah Jacobson's days working at the Uptown Theatre in Minneapolis as a high school student.

The film was shot in San Francisco. It was filmed with minimal equipment consisting of one 16mm camera, one tape recorder, one microphone, and four lights. Kim Gordon of Sonic Youth and director Tamra Davis helped financially support the production when it was running low on funding.

The film features songs from Minnesota-based artists, such as The Replacements and Babes in Toyland.

== Release ==
The film had its premiere at the Chicago Underground Film Festival on August 14, 1996. It was shown at sold-out screenings at the Sundance Film Festival, Raindance Film Festival and South by Southwest in 1997. It received a limited theatrical release in the United States on March 22, 1998.

In 2019, the film received a 2K restoration from the American Genre Film Archive, and on September 17, 2019, the company released a Blu-ray and DVD compilation that featured Mary Jane's Not a Virgin Anymore and Jacobson's 1993 film I Was a Teenage Serial Killer, alongside several of her short films and music videos.

== Reception ==
On the review aggregator website Rotten Tomatoes, 78% of 9 critics' reviews are positive, with an average rating of 4.9/10.

Kristin Tillotson of the Star Tribune called it "a raucous and real effort". Katie Duggan of Film Daze said, "As if it wasn't already clear that being a teenage girl isn't easy, Mary Jane's Not a Virgin Anymore further emphasizes the gap between media images of women and their lived realities." The Austin Chronicle's Marjorie Baumgarten praised the script and performances, writing "Jacobson's film presents kids talking just as you suspect they do in real life, while it uncovers forthright, new ways to portray a girl's first-time sexual experiences that do not involve soft-focus, bittersweet memories or fond recollections of youth spent." Baumgarten admitted that "the film is rather short on plot and what there is, is awfully contrived". Film Threat and Variety reacted negatively to the film, criticizing the production values; the former called it "an overly long, exceedingly talky, preachy film, something between a bad after-school special and a feminist version of Clerks". Roger Ebert and Amy Taubin were among the critics who supported the film.
