= Anna Joy Springer =

Anna Joy Springer is an American author, visual artist, feminist punk performer, and an associate professor of writing at University of California, San Diego, Springer is the recipient of the Distinguished Teaching Award (2010) and the Chancellor's Associates Faculty Excellence Award for Visual Arts and Performance (2013).

== Biography ==
Springer spent her early years in Merced, California where her family raised birds. Springer attended school in the San Francisco Bay Area and was friends with Kathy Acker. She entered the punk scene and was a singer for the bands Blatz, The Gr'ups, and Cypher in the Snow, touring the US and Europe. Springer has also toured with the feminist spoken-word collective Sister Spit.

Springer earned her MFA in literary arts from Brown University in 2002. Characterized as an "ex-punk Buddhist dyke writer of cross-genre works", she is known for her work in experimental literature, including the books The Vicious Red Relic, Love (2011) and The Birdwisher (2009). In The Vicious Red Relic, Love, Springer's protagonist fashions a creature to go back in time to be with her first lover as she commits suicide. In a review for The Journal, Janis Butler Holm describes the book as postmodern and writes that it "prompts us to consider how cultures have taught us to express—and to suppress—our love, our sexuality, our grief."
