= Calculated =

Studio album by Heavens to Betsy
- Released: March 21, 1994
- Recorded: November 30 – December 3, 1993
- Genre: Punk rock • riot grrrl
- Length: 39:50
- Label: Kill Rock Stars
- Producer: Heavens to Betsy

Calculated is the only studio album by the American punk rock band Heavens to Betsy, released on March 21, 1994, by Kill Rock Stars. The album received positive reviews from critics.

== Recording and release ==
Calculated was recorded in Seattle, Washington, between November 30 and December 3, 1993. It was released on March 21, 1994, by the independent record label Kill Rock Stars.

== Critical reception ==
Professional ratings
Review scores
| Source | Rating |
|---|---|
| AllMusic | 4.5/5 stars |
| Robert Christgau | A− |

Calculated received positive reviews from music critics. AllMusic reviewer Kurt Morris stated that "Sawyer keeps the beats tight and Tucker is always brimming over with passion and the kind of power of which many bands in the hardcore scene aren't even capable. Not so much in an overtly masculine manner, but through intelligently refined viciousness transmitted via the appropriate musical spectrum". Similarly, Robert Christgau highlighted Tucker's noisy guitar playing as well as Sawyer's controlled drumming. Trouser Press wrote that "despite the pair’s rudimentary instrumental skills, the songs are well formed, and their contrasting vocal styles (Tucker’s warbly fortitude versus Sawyer’s spine-chilling screams) create a mighty tension."

== Track listing ==
All music is composed by Heavens to Betsy.

| No. | Title | Length |
|---|---|---|
| 1. | "Nothing Can Stop Me" | 2:03 |
| 2. | "Decide" | 4:21 |
| 3. | "Stay Away" | 3:19 |
| 4. | "Calculated" | 1:54 |
| 5. | "Waitress Hell" | 2:30 |
| 6. | "Intermission 247" | 2:50 |
| 7. | "Axemen" | 4:19 |
| 8. | "Donating My Body To Science" | 3:55 |
| 9. | "Terrorist" | 1:57 |
| 10. | "Complicated" | 6:24 |
| 11. | "White Girl" | 1:42 |
| 12. | "Paralyzed" | 4:25 |
| Total length: | | 39:50 |

== Personnel ==
Credits are adapted from Allmusic.

- Corin Tucker – vocals, guitar, drums
- Tracy Sawyer – bass, drums, guitar, sound effects
- Gloria Anzaldúa – editing
- James Bertram – photography
- Tiffany Clendenin – photography
- John Goodmanson – engineer
- Heavens to Betsy – producer
