= Captain My Captain =

Studio album by Team Dresch
- Released: June 4, 1996
- Recorded: November 1995
- Studios: John and Stu's Place in Seattle, Washington
- Genres: Punk rock, queercore
- Length: 39:16
- Labels: Chainsaw, Candy Ass
- Producer: John Goodmanson

Team Dresch chronology
Personal Best (1995)	Captain My Captain (1996)	Choices, Chances, Changes: Singles & Comptracks 1994–2000 (2019)

Captain My Captain is the second studio album by the pioneering American queercore band Team Dresch. The album was released on June 4, 1996, by Chainsaw Records and Candy Ass Records. It was reissued in 2019 by Jealous Butcher Records, to coincide with a 25th anniversary reunion tour.

== Recording ==
Captain My Captain was recorded in November 1995 at John and Stu's Place in Seattle, Washington and produced by John Goodmanson. Singer and guitarist Jody Bleyle stated that a lot of her writing on the album had to do with a "physical and emotional breakdown" she had before its recording. At the time, she recalled that the band's focus on politics and self-defense went "far beyond being an obsession", especially during an eight-week tour to support the Free to Fight project.

== Reception ==
Professional ratings
Review scores
Source	Rating
AllMusic	4.5/5 stars
Christgau's Consumer Guide	(2-star Honorable Mention)
The Great Indie Discography	7/10
MusicHound Rock	3.5/5 stars
Ox-Fanzine	(Note: Score is shared with Personal Best.)
Paste	7.5/10
Pitchfork	8.8/10
Rolling Stone	3/5 stars
Spin	7/10

Although Captain My Captain received positive reviews from critics, it was generally considered inferior to its predecessor, Personal Best.

== Track listing ==
1. "Uncle Phranc" – 3:23
2. "107" – 4:05
3. "My Dirty Hands are Mined" – 3:00
4. "The Council" – 3:20
5. "Don't Try Suicide" – 3:11
6. "To the Enemies of Political Rock" – 2:26
7. "Take on Me" – 1:59
8. "Yes I Am Too But Who Am I Really?" – 2:50
9. "I'm Illegal" – 2:32
10. "Musical Fanzine" – 3:51
11. "Remember Who You Are" – 8:19
