= Bet the Sky =

Studio album by Lois
- Released: 1995
- Studio: Avast!
- Genre: Folk punk
- Label: K
- Producer: Stuart Hallerman, Lois Maffeo, Calvin Johnson

Lois chronology
Shy Town EP (1995)	Bet the Sky (1995)	Infinity Plus (1996)

Bet the Sky is an album by the American band Lois, released in 1995. "Shy Town" was released as a single.

Lois supported the album by touring with Fugazi.

== Production ==
Brendan Canty and Heather Dunn joined Lois Maffeo for the making of Bet the Sky, which was written and recorded in Olympia, Washington. "Shy Town" first appeared on an EP, produced by Ian MacKaye. The album opens and closes with Maffeo solo tracks.

== Critical reception ==
Professional ratings
Review scores
Source	Rating
The Albuquerque Tribune	A−
AllMusic	4/5 stars

Trouser Press called the album "a welcome return to acoustic wimpiness," writing that, "though it contains fewer instantly memorable songs than Lois’ other records, the album does have some of Maffeo's best lyrics ... and some beautiful, assured singing." The Washington Post deemed it Lois' "craftiest album yet," writing that "such simple, sparkling tunes as 'Steal Heat' and 'Shy Town' retain the slightly punky, mostly folkie charm of the bicoastal singer's two previous long-players." The Staten Island Advance considered it a "superb array of vibrant, jangly pop-punk and moody acoustic torch songs."

The Philadelphia Inquirer stated that "it's a low-fi affair, with Maffeo's sharp, breezy tunes presented in simple, accessible arrangements that use folk instrumentation and slightly off-kilter rhythms." The Los Angeles Times concluded that Maffeo's "off-kilter, mostly acoustic approach is compelling, avoiding the self-righteous stance or baby-doll trimmings that plague many of [Olympia's] artists." Rolling Stone determined that, "cushioned by airy, evocative melodies and the simple strum of a guitar, Maffeo's songs speak in the universal language of regret." The Albuquerque Tribune labeled Bet the Sky "wonderful, crunchy, rough-over-rouge punk folk."

AllMusic wrote that "the opening 'Charles Atlas', a witty recasting of the wimp-turned-macho man ads from the comic books, is one of Maffeo's best songs, with a memorable hook and sing-along chorus."

== Track listing ==
No.	Title	Length
1.	"Charles Atlas"
2.	"Shy Town"
3.	"Cover Yr. Eyes"
4.	"Transatlantic Telephone Call"
5.	"Wrestling an Angel"
6.	"Flamer"
7.	"The Western"
8.	"Unattached"
9.	"Steal Heat"
10.	"February 15"

== Personnel ==
- Brendan Canty – guitar
- Heather Dunn – drums
- Lois Maffeo – vocals, guitar
