= Excuse 17 =

American punk rock band (1993–1995)

- Origin: Olympia, Washington, United States
- Genres: Punk rock, queercore
- Years active: 1993–1995
- Labels: Chainsaw, Kill Rock Stars, Candy Ass, Atlas
- Past members: Becca Albee; Carrie Brownstein; CJ Phillips (Curtis James)

Excuse 17 was an American punk rock band from Olympia, Washington that performed and recorded from 1993 to 1995. The band consisted of Becca Albee (vocals and guitar), Carrie Brownstein (guitar and vocals), and Curtis James (drums). The band recorded two full-length albums and a single, and contributed to several compilation albums.

== History ==
Brownstein, Albee and CJ (Curtis James) Phillips came together to form Excuse 17, a band that lasted only a few years but would prove to be influential. Brownstein and Albee both played guitar and sang and CJ played the drums. The band quickly recorded a demo tape and then began recording for various compilations on independent record labels. Their first full-length recording, Excuse Seventeen, was released jointly on Atlas Records (LP) and the queercore label Chainsaw Records (CD). They released a second and final album, Such Friends Are Dangerous, on the indie label Kill Rock Stars in 1995, which displayed a boost in recording quality.

The band unsurprisingly played shows often with Heavens to Betsy, including touring, since both bands were an active part of the riot grrrl scene. They also both appear on the compilation LP/CD Free to Fight. Corin Tucker from Heavens to Betsy struck up a friendship with Brownstein and they dated for a time. They decided to form Sleater-Kinney, a side project that soon evolved into their main focus as their respective groups ended. However, Excuse 17's recordings are still valued by fans of Sleater-Kinney, those interested in riot grrrl and queercore recordings, and record collectors in general: Such Friends Are Dangerous was named one of the fifty best indie rock albums of the Pacific Northwest by online music magazine Pitchfork. Albee also recorded with Tucker as Heartless Martin, releasing a cassette on Chainsaw Records in 1993.

Following the dissolution of Excuse 17, Albee has built a successful career in visual art. Her work has been praised by publications including Bomb, Tom Tom, Artforum, and Aperture. Her papers are being preserved by the Fales Library at New York University. As of 2017 she is a photography professor at the City College of New York.

== Discography ==
=== Albums ===
- Excuse Seventeen on Chainsaw Records (CD) and Atlas Records (LP) (1994)
- Such Friends Are Dangerous on Kill Rock Stars (1995)

=== Singles ===
- "Youth On Fire" split single with Lync on Candy Ass Records

=== Compilations ===
- "Sevenwhateverteen" on Periscope, Yoyo Recordings (1994)
- "Despise" on Soda Jerk's Fountain of Youth (1994)
- "Forever Fired" on Free to Fight, Candy Ass - Chainsaw co-release (1995)
- "Carson" on Yoyo A GoGo, Yoyo Recordings (1996)
- "I'd Rather Eat Glass" on A Slice Of Lemon, Kill Rock Stars (1996)
