= I Was a Teenage Serial Killer =

- Film poster
- Directed by: Sarah Jacobson
- Written by: Sarah Jacobson
- Starring: Kristin Calabrese
- Cinematography: Sarah Jacobson
- Edited by: Sarah Jacobson
- Music by: Heavens to Betsy
- Distributed by: Station Wagon Productions
- Release date: October 1993; (Chicago International Film Festival)
- Running time: 25 minutes
- Country: United States
- Language: English
- Budget: $1,600 (estimated)

I Was a Teenage Serial Killer is an underground no budget film written and directed by independent filmmaker Sarah Jacobson. It is a short black-and-white film of a 19-year-old girl who is sick of sexist men and kills them. It was Jacobson's first major film and it was released through her own company, Station Wagon Productions. She made the film under the guidance of her teacher, George Kuchar. The film features songs by the early riot grrrl band Heavens to Betsy.

Ed Halter, writing in the Village Voice, considered it "a key film of that decade's angrily subversive underground cinema."

== Plot ==
The film opens with footage of a woman, Mary (Kristin Calabrese), caressing a blood-soaked corpse (Phil Calabrese) in a junkyard while a radio announcer (Chris Stoehr) talks about a man being a victim of homicide. Voice over reveals that Mary shot the man after he came on to her. The woman then drives to meet with her brother (Bob Hendershot) who begins heavily drinking and lecturing her on her dating habits, suggesting that she find a man to have children with. Suddenly, he starts violently coughing, and dies. It's then revealed that Mary has laced his drink with mouse poison. After leaving, Mary meets a man (Zach Kadish) who quickly takes her home to have sex. However, he attempts to remove his condom mid-coitus, causing her to fly into a rage and strangle him to death.

In an alleyway, Mary sees a man (Alan Pierson) with his partner (Kathie Smith) spray-paint a heart on the wall. After the man begins catcalling Mary, she pushes him into the road and he is run over. While walking away from the scene, Mary hears a man screaming. Following the screams, Mary finds a fellow serial killer, Henry (Gorey), murdering a man (Steven Nereo), and assists him. Henry explains that he only kills straight men as a way of getting back at a patriarchal society. Together, he and Mary go on a killing spree together. However, after Henry brings home a woman (Dianne McGeachy) to kill, Mary instead kills him and releases the girl.

Mary meets a homeless man (Scott Garver). She confesses to him that she's killed 19 men, and opens up about her father sexually abusing her as a child. When the man suggests that the abuse may have been her fault due to her physical attractiveness, she holds a broken bottle to his throat and rants about the men in her life who have never taken her story seriously. In the end, she decides not to kill him, deciding that she can express more power by telling her story regardless of how ignorant men may attempt to invalidate her or keep her quiet.

== Cast ==
Please note that some members of the cast are listed as mononyms.

- Kristin Calabrese as Mary, The Teenage Serial Killer
- Phil Calabrese as First Victim / Guy Tied to the Refrigerator
- Steven Nereo as First Victim's Voice / Henry's Boy Victim
- Chris Stoeher as Radio Announcer
- Bob Hendershot as Brother
- James Brown as Brother's Voice
- Zach Kadish as Sex Partner
- Sarah Rothstein as Little Girl with Chalk
- Kathie Smith as Girl in Love
- Alan Pierson as Boy with Spray Pain
- Ed as Guy on the Street
- Gorey as Henry, The Serial Killer Boyfriend
- Dianne McGeachy as Henry's Girl Victim
- Scott Garvey as Street Bum
- Jeff Stein as Asshole Drug Dealer

== Release ==
A Blu-ray and DVD compilation featuring Jacobson's 1996 film Mary Jane's Not a Virgin Anymore and several of her short films and music videos was released by the American Genre Film Archive on September 17, 2019.
