= Sarah Dougher =

American singer-songwriter (born 1967)

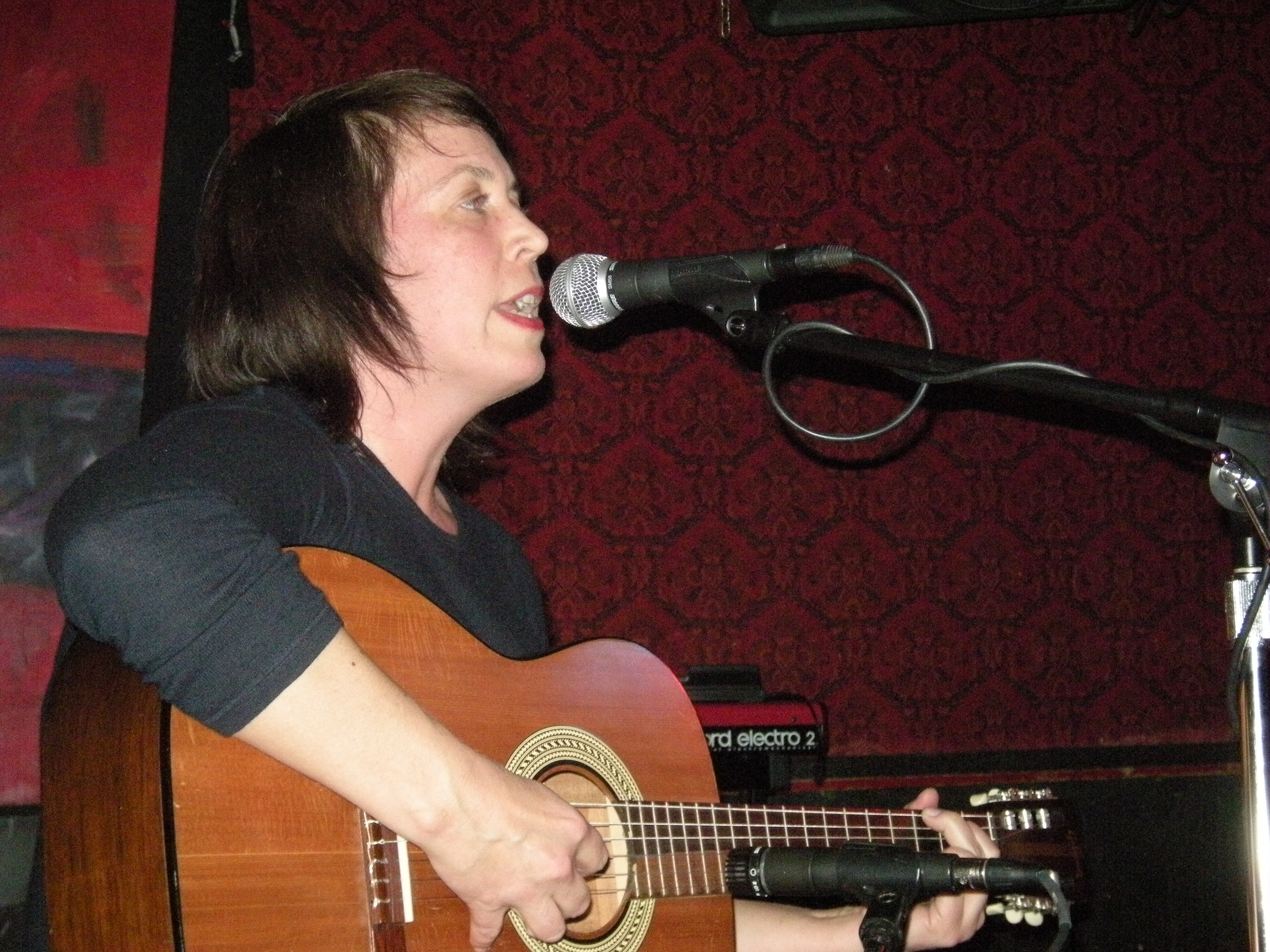
- Dougher performing in Seattle, 2009
- Born: Sarah Eugenie Dougher; September 15, 1967 (age 58); Eugene, Oregon, U.S.
- Education: Reed College; University of Texas at Austin
- Musical career
- Also known as: Dusty (while in Cadallaca), The Doog, Doogs
- Genres: Indie; folk; alternative
- Occupations: Singer; songwriter; composer; educator; author; artist
- Instruments: Guitar; farfisa organ
- Years active: ca. early 1990s – present
- Labels: K Records; Kill Rock Stars; Mr. Lady

Sarah Eugenie Dougher /ˈduːɡər/ (born September 15, 1967) is an American singer-songwriter, author, and teacher.

== Early life ==
Sarah Eugenie Dougher was born on September 15, 1967, in Eugene, Oregon. Dougher received a PhD in comparative literature from the University of Texas at Austin in 1997, and teaches in the women's studies department at Portland State University.

== Career ==
Dougher began her musical career playing the Farfisa organ in the Portland, Oregon based band The Crabs, and later joined Cadallaca with Sleater-Kinney frontwoman Corin Tucker. She has also released multiple solo albums.

Dougher has released eight albums, a combination of work with bands as well as solo releases. Since 2007, she has co-directed Portland's Flash Choir with Pat Janowski. The Flash Choir is free, no-audition choir that specializes in collaborative, audience-inclusive work. In January 2010 she debuted a 10-song composition called "Strangers Together," with a libretto from Oregon poet and pacifist William Stafford's book, Passwords. Portland's Regional Arts and Culture Council supported the creation and production of this work through a project grant. In 2009, she composed a choral work called Caesar's Gatebased on the collaborative work of poet Robert Duncan and collage artist, Jess, commissioned by the Cooley Gallery at Reed College.

The first of her solo albums, Day One, was released on indie label K Records in 1999; the latter two, 2000's The Walls Ablaze and 2001's The Bluff, were released on Mr. Lady records. In June 2005, Dougher released Harper's Arrow on the Cherchez La Femme label. Beginning with "Day One", Sarah began a long-lasting collaboration with Jon Nikki (Prima Donnas, Gene Defcon, Mocket, Sir, Sarah Dougher, Puce Moment). Jon Nikki contributed guitar, keyboards and piano, bass and drums on many of Sarah's recordings as well as a songwriting credit on the album "Walls Ablaze" for the song "What's Good Is Better Than Gone".

=== Cadallaca ===
Dougher has also worked with Sleater-Kinney vocalist Corin Tucker and novelist sts in the band Cadallaca, where she provided vocals and played the Farfisa organ. In the tradition of 1960's girl groups, each member of the band assumed an alias, Dougher being credited as Dusty. The band put out two official albums: Introducing Cadallaca (K Records) and Out West(an EP, on Kill Rock Stars).

=== The Crabs ===
The Crabs were a Portland, Oregon-based indie-rock band. Originally formed as a duo in 1993 with John Lunsford (vocals, guitar) and Lisa Jackson (vocals, drums), the pair later added Sarah Dougher on keyboard following their 1997 release What Were Flames Now Smolder. Dougher contributes keyboards and vocals to the 1999 release, Sand and Sea

== Other ventures ==
Dougher is an alumna of Reed College (class of 1990) and has a PhD in comparative literature from the University of Texas at Austin. Apart from her musical endeavours, Dougher teaches courses on the History of Women in Rock music and Lyric Poetry in the Women's Studies department at Portland State University. She also teaches a course on homeless adolescents and food insecurity.

Dougher has been an organizer for the Rock and Roll Camp for Girls, and is currently involved with the Girls Rock Camp Alliance, an international coalition of girls' rock camps. Between 2006 and 2010, she worked as a full-time teacher and development person for p:ear, a mentoring program for homeless teens in downtown Portland.

Dougher started the record label 'Cherchez La Femme', which centers around the same grassroots feminist ideals of the labels Dougher herself has previously recorded under. In 2006, Dougher was hired to score a version of Euripides' classical Greek tragedy Orestes, which ran for five weeks in Portland.

Between 2014 and 2015, Dougher taught high school in Oslo, Norway on a Fulbright Scholarship.

== Discography ==
Solo

- Day One (1999)
- The Walls Ablaze (2000)
- The Bluff (2001)
- Harper's Arrow (2005)
- Orestes (2009)

== See also ==
- List of LGBT people from Portland, Oregon
- "Riot Grrrl, Ladyfest and Rock Camps for Girls" in Women Make Noise: Girl Bands from Motown to the Modern. (2012).
