= Introducing Cadallaca =

Studio album by Cadallaca
- Released: September 29, 1998
- Genre: Punk rock
- Length: 34:11
- Label: K
- Producer: Calvin Johnson

Cadallaca chronology
Introducing Cadallaca (1998)	Out West (2000)

Introducing Cadallaca is the only studio album by punk rock band Cadallaca, released on September 29, 1998, on K Records.

== Music and lyrics ==
All of the ten songs on Introducing Cadallaca feature a Farfisa organ. According to Cadallaca's members, it was easy for them to write the songs on the album.

== Critical reception ==
Professional ratings
Review scores
Source	Rating
AllMusic	3/5 stars
NME	7/10
Pitchfork	7.8/10
The Village Voice	A

Stephanie Zacharek named Introducing Cadallaca her third favorite album of 1998. Robert Christgau gave the album an "A" grade, describing it as "a song sluice for an irrepressible talent" (referring to Corin Tucker). Stereo Review concluded that "if Sleater-Kinney had been juvenile delinquents in the '60s, they might have sounded like this: crossing a rough indie rock sound with surf guitar, Farfisa organ, and girl-group harmonies, they could be Ronnie Spector's reckless cousins."

== Track listing ==
1. Your One Wish – 3:21
2. June -n- July – 3:12
3. You're My Only One – 2:41
4. Pocket Games – 4:28
5. Night Vandals – 4:38
6. Two Beers Later – 3:09
7. O Chenilla – 3:34
8. Cadallaca Theme – 2:32
9. Firetrap – 3:16
10. Winter Storm '98 – 3:20

== Personnel ==
- Neilson Abeel – photography
- Pat Castaldo – design
- Lawrence Crane – engineer
- John Golden – mastering
- Calvin Johnson – liner notes, producer
- Corin Tucker – guitar, voices
