= Donna Dresch =

American punk rock musician

Donna Dresch is an American punk rock musician, perhaps best known as founder, guitarist and bass guitarist of Team Dresch.

Dresch has been actively involved in the queercore scene since the 1980s, as the creator of the fanzine Chainsaw and contributor to several other zines such as Outpunk and J.D.s, as well as contributing and being featured on the front cover of issue five of Deke Nihilson and Tom Jennings' zine Homocore. Additionally, she was a contributor to Tobi Vail's influential proto-Riot Grrrl fanzine, Jigsaw and Tammy Rae Carland's zine I (heart) Amy Carter. In 1992, she appeared in the cult film The Yo-Yo Gang, by G.B. Jones.

She founded the queercore independent record label Chainsaw Records in the early 1990s. Shortly after, she joined forces with Jody Bleyle and Kaia Wilson to form Team Dresch. Once drummer Marcéo Martinez was added to the line-up, the group began recording. The first single was released in 1994 on Kill Rock Stars. Their debut album in 1994, Personal Best and its follow-up, Captain My Captain, were released jointly by Chainsaw Records and Jody Bleyle's label Candy Ass Records. Team Dresch performs live and the members are interviewed in the documentary film She's Real, Worse Than Queer by Lucy Thane.

Since its inception, Chainsaw Records has housed many well-known bands such as Tracy and the Plastics and Sleater-Kinney.

In 2004, she founded a new band, Davies vs. Dresch. In 2006, Team Dresch reunited and began touring again.

In 2019, Team Dresch announced a series of reissues for the albums Personal Best and Captain My Captain through Jealous Butcher Records. The same year, the band released the single "Your Hands My Pockets", their first new song in 19 years.

In 2023, Team Dresch was inducted into the Oregon Music Hall of Fame.

In 2025, Team Dresch celebrated its 30th anniversary with reunion performances and touring.

== Other appearances ==
Dresch has appeared on many other artists' recordings, including Amy Ray's Prom; Third Sex's Card Carryin' (as producer, engineer and mixer); Phranc's Goofyfoot EP (bassist); Some Velvet Sidewalk's Shipwreck (guitarist and bassist); Hazel's Are You Going to Eat That? (producer); and Fifth Column's 36-C (guitarist).

Dresch temporarily replaced Van Conner in the Screaming Trees, and had a brief stint as bassist in Dinosaur Jr., accompanying them on their US and Australian tour in 1990. She collaborated with Slim Moon in the 1980s Olympia-based garage band Nisqually Delta Podunk Nightmare, and played bass in the Olympia grunge/punk band Dangermouse. She has also worked with Rastro! (with Jen Smith), The Go Team, Mary Lou Lord, and Lois.

== Publications ==
- McDonnell, Evelyn; Powers, Ann, editors: Rock She Wrote, Delta, N.Y.C., US, ISBN 0-385-31250-4 (1995)
- Darms, Lisa, editors: "Riot Grrrl Collection" ISBN 978-1-55861-822-0 (2015)

== Guest appearances ==
- Amy Ray – Guitar "Prom" LP
- Lois –Bass "Strumpet" LP
- Lois - Bass "Page Two" 7"
- Some Velvet Sidewalk - Bass "Shipwreck" LP
- Fifth Column – Guitar "36c" LP
- Dinosaur Jr. – Bass "The Wagon" 7"
- Phranc – Bass "Goofyfoot" 10"
- Mary Lou Lord – Guitar "Some Jingle Jangle Morning" 7"

== See also ==
- Chainsaw Records
- List of LGBT people from Portland, Oregon
- Team Dresch
