= The Whoreshoes =

American honky tonk/bluegrass/country band

- Origin: San Francisco, California, United States
- Genres: Folk music, bluegrass music, country music
- Years active: 2005–2009
- Members: Diana Greenberg; Lala Hulse; Camilla Lincoln; Joni Rueter; Emily Stucky
- Website: http://www.thewhoreshoes.com/

The Whoreshoes was an all-female, honky tonk/bluegrass/country band based in the San Francisco Bay area. The group's name is primarily a pun based on horseshoes. They have played internationally in countries such as Belgium and The Netherlands. In addition they performed at the 2007 Hardly Strictly Bluegrass Festival is San Francisco's Golden Gate Park. On February 12, 2009, they gave their final show and have since gone their separate ways.

The Whoreshoes main influences include country legends Loretta Lynn, Dolly Parton, The Carter Family, Stanley Brothers, Louvin Brothers, Doc Boggs, and alternative country acts such as Hank III, Meat Purveyors, Old Crow Medicine Show, and Lucinda Williams.

== Members and Instrument ==
- Diana Greenberg - bass, fiddle
- Lala Hulse - lapsteel, banjo, guitar, vocals
- Camilla Lincoln - banjo, piano, spoons, ukulele, vocals, washboard
- Joni Rueter - accordion, fiddle, guitar, mandolin, vocals
- Emily Stucky - guitar, old time banjo, mandolin, spoons, vocals
- Eve Bekker- mandolin, vocals

== Discography ==
- The Whoreshoes (2005)
- Get Lucky (2006)
