= Heavens to Betsy =

American punk band

- Corin Tucker performing with Heavens to Betsy in October 2026

Background information
- Origin: Olympia, Washington
- Genres: Riot grrrl, indie rock, punk rock
- Years active: 1991–1994, 2026
- Labels: Kill Rock Stars; K Records; Chainsaw Records; Yoyo
- Past members: Corin Tucker; Tracy Sawyer
- Website: www.heavens2betsy.net

Heavens to Betsy is an American punk band formed in Olympia, Washington in 1991 with vocalist and guitarist Corin Tucker and drummer Tracy Sawyer. The duo were part of the DIY riot grrrl, punk rock underground, and were Tucker's first band before she co-formed Sleater-Kinney.

Both The New York Times and Rolling Stone included Heavens to Betsy in essential riot grrrl lists. In 2018, a music writer noted, "This band's primal punk sound and powerful expressions of young female rage and desire retains the power to startle decades after their creation."

== History ==
Corin Tucker and Tracy Sawyer met in middle school in Eugene, Oregon and became friends. Sawyer said, "We kind of goofed around. ... We were like, 'Let's start a band!' But it was always kind of a joke." Tucker came up with the band name Heavens to Betsy (originally an idiom) during the spring of 1990. That summer, before Sawyer's senior year in high school and Tucker's freshman year at college, the friends went on a "music pilgrimage" to Athens, Georgia by train. There, Sawyer bought a used drum kit for $100. Tucker's father gave her a guitar he built and bought her an amplifier. The two started learning to play their instruments, practicing at Tucker's parents' house.

In the fall of 1990, Tucker went to Evergreen State College in Olympia, Washington. She found an active music scene with bands like Bikini Kill and Bratmobile. Tucker says, "I was able to finally connect with a group of people that were all in bands and they were all playing house shows. It was all happening so I just said, 'Well, I have a band, too!'" In 1991, Tucker's band was invited to play at the International Pop Underground Convention by Michelle Noel of the college's KAOS radio station. Tucker said, "She called my bluff. I said yes, even though I don't think we'd even written a song. I think Tracy had just graduated high school, and I was like, 'Great, we're playing a show.'"

Heavens to Betsy's first public appearance was a three-song set at the International Pop Underground Convention organized by independent record label K Records in August 1991. The first night of the six-day festival had an all-female bill. Dubbed "Love Rock Revolution Girl Style Now," the fifteen bands included Bratmobile, Suture, Heavens to Betsy, Jean Smith of Mecca Normal, and 7 Year Bitch. This show is considered pivotal in advancing the riot grrrl movement.

Heavens to Betsy was conceived as a two-person band—Tucker played guitar and sang vocals, and Sawyer was on drums and occasionally bass guitar. Tucker says her wailing vocals were modeled on Kathleen Hanna and Sinead O'Connor. Rolling Stone notes, "Tucker made no effort to prettify her massive wail…"

The band's songs were female-centric and covered intersectional politics, with lyrics about body shaming, terrorism, patriarchy, white privilege, periods, rape culture, racism, queerness, the plight of working people, avenging sexual abuse, and frenemies. Tucker said, "I think as a 17- or 18-year-old girl, you really feel the kind of injustice that’s done to young women really personally, that kind of scrutiny of your own body that’s done to women and your sexual power." Tucker wrote the lyrics on her own; she would compose the music either with or without Sawyer.

Their first album was an eight-song cassette recorded by fellow Evergreen student Molly Neuman from Bratmobile. Conceived as a demo, the cassette ended up being released and distributed by K Records. It has not been reissued in other formats because the master is missing. Next, they released "My Secret" on a split single with Bratmobile, also on K Records. In addition to their self-titled demo, Heavens to Betsy recorded two seven-inch records with four-songs each, and one LP, Calculated. Rolling Stone included Calculated in its "Riot Grrrl Album Guide" with a going deeper rating. The band also contributed songs to many compilations.

In 1992, Heavens To Betsy played a show in Bellingham, Washington and met Carrie Brownstein who attended Western Washington University there. Heavens to Betsy went on a United States tour with Bratmobile. Touring in the days before cell phones, Sawyer recalls, "We went with two cars and got walkie-talkies." Next, they toured England. Later, they went on another national tour with Brownstein's band, Excuse 17, before disbanding in the mid-1994. The bandmates say their relationship and personalities changed as the music got serious, and they lacked the maturity and communication skills for a business relationship.

== Post break-up ==
After Heavens to Betsy ended, Tucker and Brownstein created the band Sleater-Kinney. Tucker's other projects include Heartless Martin, Cadallaca, the Corin Tucker Band, and Filthy Friends.

Sawyer would go on to play in numerous bands, including the Flying Tigers, KaraNEEDoke, the Lies, and Motel No-Tell.

In June 2026, Heavens to Betsy reunited for a show in Portland, Oregon. The band subsequently announced a tour of the United States to take place in October and November of 2026.

== Pop culture ==
Heavens to Betsy's music was included in the 1993 film I Was A Teenage Serial Killer, 2007 film Itty Bitty Titty Committee, and the 2013 video game Gone Home. In October 2011, English artist Katie Hare created an art installation in London with videos, audio, and zines related to Heavens to Betsy album Calculated. Hare chose Calculated “because, to me, it seems to really capture the moment an individual, in this case, a young woman’s, belief system is shaken and they begin to start questioning the world around them. ...Its directness is almost shocking. I remember being kind of uncomfortable by its honesty when I first listened to the record."

In 2017, actresses Mackenzie Davis and Carrie Coon recorded an acoustic cover of the Heavens to Betsy track “Axemen" for their film Izzy Gets the F*ck Across Town. In 2021, the band Whisper Hiss covered the Heavens To Betsy song "Firefly" for Stars Rock Kill (Rock Stars), the 30th-anniversary celebration of the label Kill Rock Stars.

== Discography ==
=== Albums ===
- Heavens To Betsy, cassette, K Records (1992)
- Calculated CD/LP. Kill Rock Stars (1994)

=== Seven inch recordings ===
- PUNK1 "My Secret" Heavens to Betsy/Bratmobile split, K Records (1992)
- These Monsters Are Real, Kill Rock Stars (1992, remastered and re-released in 2018)
- Direction, Chainsaw Records (1994)

=== Compilations ===
- Kill Rock Stars compilation, CD/LP, "My Red Self" Kill Rock Stars (1991)
- Throw Yoyo Compilation, CD, "Baby's Gone" Yoyo Recordings (1992)
- Julep Another Yoyo Compilation, CD, "She's the One" Yoyo Recordings (1993)
- Free to Fight compilation, a double CD/ triple LP, "Get Out of My Head" (co-release on Candy Ass Records and Chainsaw (1995)
- Yo Yo A Go Go compilation CD/LP, "Axemen" live, Yoyo Recordings/Natch (1996)
- Some Songs compilation, CD, "Firefly", Kill Rock Stars (1997)

=== Soundtracks ===
- "My Secret", featured in I Was A Teenage Serial Killer (1993)
- "Complicated" featured in Gone Home (2013).

== See also ==
- Heaven to Betsy
