= Team Dresch =

American queercore punk rock band

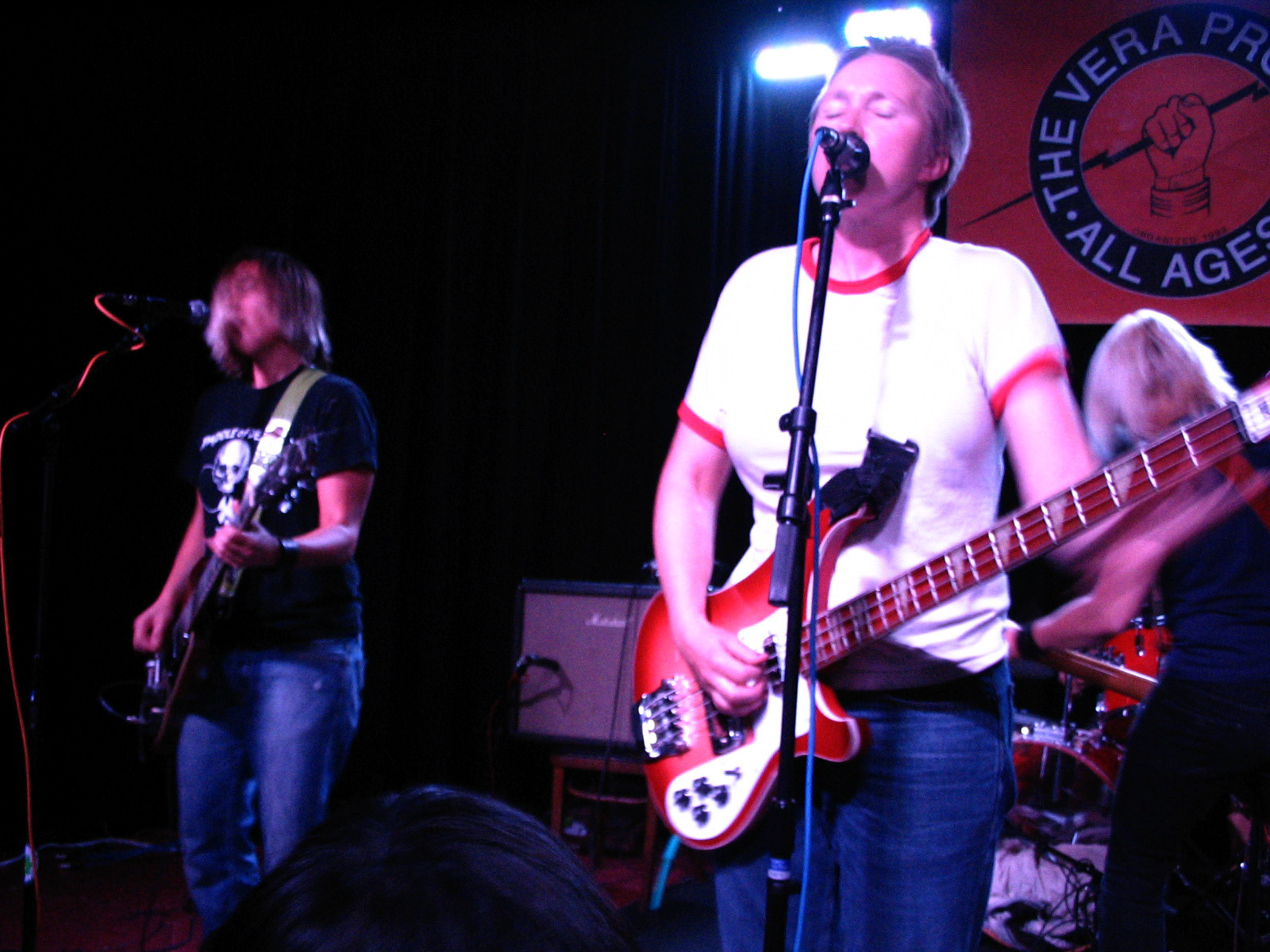
- Team Dresch performing at The Vera Project in Seattle on September 20, 2009

Background information
- Origin: Olympia, Washington
- Genres: Punk rock; queercore; riot grrrl; post-hardcore
- Years active: 1993–1998; 2004–present
- Labels: Kill Rock Stars; Chainsaw; Candy Ass; Jealous Butcher
- Members: Jody Bleyle; Kaia Wilson; Donna Dresch; Marcéo Martinez; Melissa York
- Past members: Amanda Kelley
- Website: teamdresch.com

Team Dresch is an American punk rock band originally formed in 1993 in Olympia, Washington.

== History ==
In 1993, Donna Dresch formed Team Dresch with herself playing guitar and bass, Jody Bleyle on guitar and vocals, Kaia Wilson on guitar and vocals, and Marcéo Martinez on drums. Dresch has roots in the queercore movement, contributing to the zines J.D.s and Outpunk, as well as writing her own, called Chainsaw. Dresch's involvement in queercore influenced the band's style and involvement in the scene from the beginning.

Team Dresch's first release was "Seven" on Rock Stars Kill in 1994, which generated enough attention for them to book multiple shows "all around the country," including the first Yoyo a Go Go in 1994. Today, Donna Dresch admits "people didn’t know who we were... [they] didn’t know what to make of a bunch of ’queer freaks’ onstage." In 1995 the four released their debut album, Personal Best, co-released by Chainsaw Records and Candy Ass Records, Dresch's and Bleyle's record labels respectively. The album had sold over 20,000 copies by 2004.

After the release of Personal Best, drummer Marcéo Martinez was replaced by Melissa York, and the quartet put out Captain My Captain in 1996, another co-release from Chainsaw and Candy Ass. Captain is often discussed as a more outwardly queer album than Personal Best, with the former including lyrics such as "I'm a flaming S&M rubber dyke" and "queer sex is great." The album is also praised for its themes of mental illness and reassurance. Additionally in the late 90s, Team Dresch performed in and was interviewed for the 1997 documentary film She's Real (Worse Than Queer) by Lucy Thane, which showcased the 90's riot grrrl and queercore scenes. Team Dresch disbanded in 1998 to work on individual projects. During this break, Jody Bleyle was interviewed for the 2001 German documentary Step Up and Be Vocal, Interviews zu Queer Punk und Feminismus in San Francisco by Uta Busch and Sandra Ortmann.

In 2004, Team Dresch reunited to headline the Olympia queercore festival Homo-a-Go-Go, put together by the band's friend Ed. They discuss their activity since 2004 as "taking things day by day and enjoying ourselves." They performed sporadically, embarking on brief West and East coast tours throughout 2006 and 2007, including at California's Outfest. They played in Portland and Seattle in September 2009, as well as in Brazil for two Ladyfest shows in May 2010. They played some shows in the Pacific Northwest in 2014 in addition to some in 2017. Also in 2017, they appeared in Queercore: How to Punk a Revolution, a documentary by Yony Leyser.

In March 2019, Team Dresch announced they would be reissuing their entire catalogue via Jealous Butcher Records in honor of the band's 25th anniversary. The reissue allowed Marcéo Martinez, who came out publicly as transmasculine in 2019, to have his name corrected in credits, which was "so important and necessary" for him to feel seen. They also released previously unheard music through Jealous Butcher Records with Choices, Chances, Changes: Singles & Comptracks 1994–2000. This all came alongside the release of a new video for the band's classic track "Fagetarian and Dyke." The new visual featured never-before-seen live footage of the group, offering a glimpse into the wild mosh pit-filled shows of their heyday. Along with the rerelease, they announced a US tour as well as a release of a new single, "Your Hands My Pockets," the band's first new music in 19 years.

Team Dresch released the single "Story of the Earth" in July 2020. The "fast, raw, and simple" song was written in 2007 in response to a rise in colony collapse cases. On Bandcamp, the group stated that all proceeds from the single would be donated to the Trans Justice Funding Project.

In September 2026, Team Dresch released their first full-length album in 30 years, Furthermore.

== Discography ==
=== Albums ===
- Personal Best (1995, Chainsaw Records / Candy Ass Records)
- Captain My Captain (1996, Chainsaw Records / Candy Ass Records)
- Choices, Chances, Changes: Singles & Comptracks 1994–2000 (2019, Jealous Butcher Records)
- Furthermore (2026)

=== Singles ===
- "Hand Grenade" / "Endtime Relay" / "Molasses In January" 7-inch (1994, Kill Rock Stars)
- "The New Team Dresch V 6.0 Beta" 7-inch (1998, Outpunk Records)
- "Your Hands in My Pockets" digital (2019, Jealous Butcher Records)
- "Story of the Earth" digital (2020, Jealous Butcher Records)

=== Split singles ===
- Take On Me split tour 7-inch with Bikini Kill (1996, Banda Bonnet)
- What Can a Lover Do? split 7-inch with F-80, Shove, and Dahlia Seed (1996, Marigold Records)
- It's a Conversation split 7-inch with Longstocking (1998, Sub Pop)
- Temporary Insurance split 7-inch with The Automaticons (2000, Mental Monkey Records)

=== Compilation appearances ===
- "Fake Fight" on Periscope (1994, Yoyo Recordings)
- "Seven" on Rock Stars Kill (1994, Kill Rock Stars)
- "Song for Anne Bannon" on Free to Fight (1995, Candy Ass Records / Chainsaw Records)
- "She's Amazing" (live) and "The Lesbionic Story" on Yoyo A Go Go (1996, Yoyo Recordings)
- "Hand Grenade" on Some Songs (1997, Kill Rock Stars)
- "Deattached (A Maximum Volume Interpretation)" remix by Christoph de Babalon on Join the Queercorps (1998, Queercorps)
- "Fake Fight" and "My Voice" on The Shiner Cassette (Slo-Mo Records)

== See also ==
- List of all-female bands
