= Lois Maffeo =

American musician and writer

- Genres: Indie rock; punk rock
- Occupations: Journalist; music critic; singer
- Formerly of: Courtney Love

Lois Maffeo (professionally known for much of her career as Lois) is an American musician and writer who lives in Olympia, Washington. She has been closely involved with and influenced many independent musicians, especially in the 1990s-era Olympia, Seattle and Washington, D.C. music scenes.

== Career ==
Maffeo was raised in Phoenix, Arizona, and graduated in 1981 from Xavier College Preparatory, an all-female private Catholic high school. She moved to Olympia, Washington to attend The Evergreen State College. In 1989, Maffeo and drummer Pat Maley founded the band Courtney Love, the name of which is coincidentally identical to the musician of the same name. The duo released their first single in 1990 and broke up the next year. Maffeo began performing as "Lois" in 1992; she was usually joined by drummer Heather Dunn and various backing musicians. Lois released two albums by 1994. The third album, Bet the Sky, came out in 1995. In 1996, Lois released Infinity Plus, promoting it by going on "a grueling world tour" that included the US, Europe, and Japan. Lois ended in 1996, with Maffeo taking a break from music and deciding to pursue journalism. Maffeo wrote for The Stranger, an alternative newspaper in Seattle, in addition to Out, Salon, Time Out New York, and CMJ New Music Monthly. She also provided vocals on records by Bis, Red Stars Theory, and the Evil Tambourines. In 2000, Maffeo released the album The Union Themes, a collaboration with Brendan Canty of Fugazi that was two years in the making.

== Discography ==
=== As Lois Maffeo ===
Albums

- The Union Themes (with Brendan Canty of Fugazi), 2000, Kill Rock Stars (Japanese release contains five bonus tracks)

Compilations and other collaborations/appearances

- [Untitled a cappella track], Dangerous Business International cassette, 1985, K Records
- "My Head Hurts" (with The Go Team), Archer Come Sparrow cassette, 1988/1989, K Records
- "Cup to the Wall" (with Satisfact), Life Abroad 7-inch single, 1996, K Records
- "Thick with the Paint Swaying" (with Red Stars Theory), But Sleep Came Slowly, 1997, Rx. Remedy
- "Cat Fight" (with Georgia Hubley), 2 Days in the Valley OST, 1997, Edel
- "Switch Shower Go!", Go! Olympia cassette, 1997, Yoyo Recordings
- "A Sailor's Warning" (with Red Stars Theory), Life in a Bubble Can Be Beautiful, 1999, Touch & Go Records
- "Pathways" (with The Evil Tambourines), Library Nation, 1999, Sub Pop
- "On Mars And Venus" (with The Evil Tambourines), Library Nation, 1999, Sub Pop
- "Shame The Bells", Projector: Another Studio Compilation, 1999, Yoyo Recordings
- "Hope" (with Internal/External), Featuring..., 2000, K Records
- "The Same As Being in Love" (with Harvey Danger), King James Version, 2000, Sire
- "Spray on the Fixative" (with Mark Robinson), Origami And Urbanism, 2003, Tomlab

=== With Cradle Robbers (with Rebecca Gates of the Spinanes) ===
Compilations

- "Sotto Voce", Red Hot + Bothered/Indie Rock Guide To Dating, 1995, Kinetic/Reprise

=== With Lumihoops ===
Compilations

- "Roman Holiday", Throw: The Yoyo Studio Compilation, 1992, Yoyo Recordings

=== With Courtney Love (the band) ===
Singles and EPs

- Uncrushworthy 7-inch EP, 1990, K Records
- Highlights 7-inch EP, 1991, K Records
- Hey! Antoinette 7-inch EP, 1991, Feel Good All Over

Compilations

- "Don't Mix The Colors", Kill Rock Stars, 1991, Kill Rock Stars
- "Spray", Throw: The Yoyo Studio Compilation, 1992, Yoyo Recordings
- "Baseball Bat", One Last Kiss, 1992, spinART Records
- "Shaniko", TeenBeat Fifty, 1993, TeenBeat Records
- "Motorcycle Boy", International Pop Underground Convention, 1995, K Records

=== As Lois ===
Albums

- Butterfly Kiss, 1992, K Records
- Strumpet, 1993, K Records
- Bet the Sky, 1995, K Records
- Infinity Plus, 1996, K Records

Cassettes

- Lowrider cassette, 1994, Slabco

Compilations

- Butter Yellow: A Lois Collection, 1996, Rebel Beat Factory

Singles and EPs

- Press Play And Record 7-inch single, 1992, K Records
- Trouble With Me 7-inch single, 1993, K Records
- Shy Town EP, 1995, K Records
- Snapshot Radio EP, 1996, K Records
- Ship To Shore maxi-single/EP (with Dub Narcotic Sound System), 1996, K Records
- ...And His Baby Blue EP (with Sean Na Na), 1998, Polyvinyl Records

Appearances, Split singles/EPs, and other collaborations

- "Indie", July [Split] 7-inch single (with Nothing Painted Blue), 1993, Simple Machines
- "Long Time Gone", International Hip Swing, 1993, K Records
- "Indie", Working Holiday!, 1994, Simple Machines
- "Strumpet", Yoyo A Go Go, 1994, Yoyo Recordings
- "St. What's-Her-Name", Free To Fight 2-CD/LP set, 1995, Chainsaw Records/Candy Ass Records (as "The Lois")
- "Ship To Shore" (with Dub Narcotic Sound System), Boot Party, 1996, K Records
- "A Summer Long", Paper [Split] 7-inch EP (with Mad Planets, Low, and The Receptionists), 1997, Papercut
- "Girls! Girls! Girls!", Southern/Tree/Polyvinyl Fall/Winter 1998 Compilation (with Sean Na Na), 1998
- "Davey", Yoyo A Go Go: Another Live Yoyo Compilation, 1999, Yoyo Recordings
- "Detour" (with Bis), Social Dancing, 1999, Capitol
- "Detour" (with Bis), Detour EP, 1999, Willija
- "2-9476" (with Sean Na Na), Troubleman Mix-Tape, 2001, Troubleman Unlimited

=== With Tommy ===
Compilations

- "Go Sonics", Selector Dub Narcotic, 1998, K Records

=== With The Tentacles ===
Singles and EPs

- The Touch 7-inch single, 1999, K Records

=== With Owl & The Pussycat ===
Albums

- Owl & The Pussycat, 2003, Kill Rock Stars
