= Blatz (band) =

American punk band

- Origin: Berkeley, California, United States
- Genres: Punk rock
- Years active: 1989–1992
- Labels: Lookout! Records, Alternative Tentacles

Blatz was an American punk band formed in 1989 in Berkeley, California, United States. Blatz came out of the 924 Gilman Street Project scene during the late 1980s, and early 1990s along with bands like Operation Ivy, Filth, and Green Day.

== History ==
Blatz was an early 1990s East Bay punk band.

== Members ==
- Robert Eggplant (guitar) (1989–1992)
- Joey Perales (drums) (1989–1992)
- John Santos (bass) (1989)
- Marshall Stax (bass) (1989–1992)
- Jesse Luscious (vocals) (1989–1992)
- Anna Joy Springer (vocals) (1990–1992)
- Annie Lalania (vocals) (1990–1992)
- Billie Joe Armstrong (2nd Guitar)

== Discography ==
=== EPs ===
- Cheaper Than The Beer Lookout! Records (1990) (out of print)
- Cheaper Than The Beer Life Is Abuse Records (2000) (out of print)
- Cheaper Than The Beer Silver Sprocket (2009)
- Mike Montano Live Mike Montano Benefit Show 2003 (2016)

=== Splits ===
- Bitches and Brew (split 7-inch single with Tribe 8) Lickout! Records (1992) (identical to Stranger Fruit except for cover)
- The Shit Split (split LP with Filth) Lookout! Records (1991), released as split CD including EP & Split EP on Lookout! Records (1996) (out of print)
- The Shit Split (split LP with Filth) Life Is Abuse Records (2000), released as split CD including EP & Split EP on Life Is Abuse Records (2000) (out of print)
- The Shit Split (split LP with Filth) Alternative Tentacles (2009), released as split CD including EP & Split EP on Alternative Tentacles (2009)

=== Demos ===
- Banned in R.C (Demo) (1990)

=== Compilation appearances ===
- Can of Pork (1992)
- (You're Only As Good As) The Last Great Thing You Did! (1997)
- Later That Same Year (1999)
