= Becca Albee =

American musician and visual artist

- Education: Evergreen State College (B.A.); University of North Carolina (M.F.A.)
- Occupations: Visual artist, musician
- Years active: 1993–present
- Known for: Solo exhibitions: F Is for Fake: The construction of femaleness by the US Media (2011); prismataria (2017)
- Musical career
- Instruments: Vocals, guitar
- Formerly of: Excuse 17

Becca Albee is an American musician and visual artist who was a founding member of the band Excuse 17, which was an early pioneer in the riot grrrl and third-wave feminism movements. She is based in Brooklyn, New York.

== Early life and education ==
Albee is a native of Portland, Maine and the daughter of historian and author Parker Bishop Albee Jr. She attended Evergreen State College in Olympia, Washington where she obtained a Bachelor of Arts (B.A.) degree, and the University of North Carolina in Chapel Hill, North Carolina, where she obtained a Master of Fine Arts (M.F.A.) degree.

== Music career ==
Albee was a founding member (vocals and guitar) of the punk rock riot grrrl band Excuse 17 with Curtis J. Phillips (drums) and Carrie Brownstein (guitar and vocals). Albee had met Brownstein while attending Evergreen. Excuse 17 was a pioneer in the DIY and feminism movements and Olympia music scene of the early 1990s in Olympia, Washington. Albee also was a member of the band Heartless Martin with Corin Tucker, who later joined Brownstein in founding Sleater-Kinney. Albee donated an archival collection related to her involvement in the riot grrrl movement and musical groups to the Fales Library and Special Collections at NYU (now NYU Special Collections).

== Visual art career ==
Albee's art career has included photography, video, sculpture, and installations. Her first exhibit was initiated by friend and fellow musician Kathleen Hanna in Olympia, and she later exhibited in Seattle, Washington, Buenos Aires, Argentina and New York City. She currently is an associate professor of photography at the City University of New York. A 2011 exhibit at Cleopatra's in Brooklyn was entitled "F Is for Fake: The construction of femaleness by the US Media." It was inspired by a book by her historian father about a fake autobiography published by actress Joan Lowell in 1929 about her childhood growing up on a ship. Her work has also been exhibited in the New York City exhibition space Art in General.

In 2017 she had a solo exhibit prismataria that employed a custom rotating light fixture to bathe a suite of photographs, many depicting feminist books.

From December 2019-February 2020, Albee exhibited "List Projects 20: Becca Albee" at the MIT List Visual Arts Center. According to the press release, the exhibition "engag[ed] two distinct sites of research and production—the archive and Brooklyn’s Plumb Beach to reflect on deep and mortal time scales, as well as the enduring impact of a relationship frozen in memory." It featured Albee's photography of correspondence and other material in her friend and teacher Robert Blanchon's personal and professional papers at the Fales Library and Special Collections, as well as material related to the population of horseshoe crabs at Plumb Beach in Brooklyn.
