= Filth (band) =

American hardcore punk band

- Origin: East Bay, California, U.S.
- Genres: Hardcore punk, crust punk
- Years active: 1989–1991, 2010
- Labels: Lookout! Records, Life is Abuse Records, Alternative Tentacles

Filth was an American hardcore punk band from East Bay, California. Formed in 1989, Filth was a crustcore band that helped define the "later East Bay hardcore" style. The band combined upbeat, sometimes poppy guitar with harsh screamed vocals.

The rhythm section was composed of Mike-o the Psycho on bass, Dave (E.C.) Henwood on drums, and Jim Gray on guitar. Dave left the band after recording the Shit Split LP (1990) and Toby was brought in to replace him. They released a split album with Blatz, known as the Shit Split (1991), on Lookout Records originally on LP and Cassette- a 2xCD version was released in the mid-1990s. In 2000 the LP & 2xCD were moved to Life Is Abuse. In 2008 Life Is Abuse ended regular operations so the LP & 2xCD was moved to its current home, Alternative Tentacles. The 2xCD contains both bands complete discography including the "This Is Why We Are the Drunks" split 7-inch with Submachine from Pittsburgh, PA and Filth's 1990 demo tape.

Toby left the band in 1991, and Joey of Blatz stepped in shortly before the band's premature 1992 break-up. Len Rokk and Mike-O the Psycho were founding members of Strychnine in 1995, and both left the band after recording the Dead Rats and Oakland Dogs LP. Mike and Jake founded a band with Shoshanna Wheaton called Fields Of Shit, who only recorded one 10-inch EP before disbanding. Jim moved back to Canada and formed a band called Tension. Jake, Clara, Jerry, and Mauz formed Abandon in 2003. Dave later played in the Wynona Riders and later the Vagrants.

Filth re-united in 2010 and performed four shows: June 4 at the 924 Gilman Street, another on June 5 at The Hazmat in Oakland, CA, one in San Francisco at Thee Parkside, and another June 10 at The Uptown in Oakland, CA.

== Members ==
- Jake Sayles – vocals
- Len Rokk – guitar
- Jim Gray – guitar
- "Mike-O the Psycho" – bass
- Dave E.C. Henwood – drums
- Toby – drums
- Jon Summerall – bass
- Joey Perales – drums
- Derek Dykeman – drums, December 1990 to February 1991

== Discography ==
- 1990: Live the Chaos 7-inch (Lookout! Records)
- 1990: If You Can See Through It... It Ain't Coffee compilation (Very Small Records)
- 1990: The Shit Split (split with Blatz) Lookout! Records
- 1992: This Is Why We Are the Drunks (split w/ Submachine) (Rust Records)
- 1992: There's a Faggot in the Pit compilation (Bobo Records)
- 1999: Later That Same Year... compilation (S.P.A.M. Records)
- 2000: The Shit Split (split with Blatz) (Life is Abuse Records)
- 2000: Live the Chaos (Life Is Abuse Records)
- 2008: The Shit Split (split with Blatz) (Alternative Tentacles)
- 2008: Live the Chaos (Silver Sprocket)
- 2017: Live at Gilman Feb 28 1992 (no label)
