= Melissa York =

American drummer

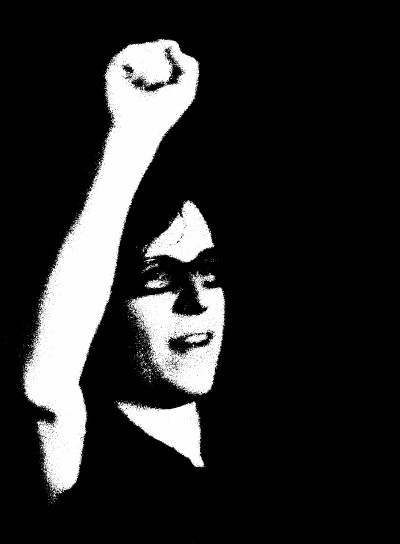
- Melissa York with fist in air during performance at The Saint in Asbury Park, NJ, April 2012

Background information
- Born: February 22, 1969 (age 56)
- Genres: Punk rock, hardcore punk, indie rock
- Instrument(s): Drums, percussion
- Years active: 1990–present
- Labels: Vermiform, Kill Rock Stars
- Formerly of: The Manacled, Born Against, Vitapup, Team Dresch, The Butchies, Amy Ray, Ex-Members, Humble Tripe

Melissa York is a rock drummer noted for her work with iconic lesbian bands such as Team Dresch, The Butchies, and Amy Ray. She lives in Durham, North Carolina.

== Biography ==
York first began drumming with the New York-based hardcore punk bands Born Against, the Manacled, and Vitapup. Following this, she moved to the West Coast to drum for Team Dresch in 1993. When Team Dresch broke up in 1998, York and band-mate Kaia Wilson, together with Alison Martlew, formed the power punk lesbian-feminist band, The Butchies (1998-2005), which put out four albums.

She has remained active in the lesbian and punk music scene, touring with the Indigo Girls' Amy Ray and playing in a band called The Ex-Members and the band Humble Tripe.

== In popular culture ==
Her name appears in the lyrics of the Le Tigre song "Hot Topic."
