= The Third Sex (band) =

American queercore band

- Origin: Portland, Oregon
- Genres: Queercore, riot grrrl
- Years active: 1993–2000, 2010
- Labels: Chainsaw Records, Kill Rock Stars, Mr. Lady Records

The Third Sex was an American queercore band formed in 1993 in Portland, Oregon. The band featured Trish Walsh on guitar and vocals, Peyton Marshall on bass and vocals and, initially, a series of drummers. Although primarily a two-piece band, they helped propagate the queercore movement across the country. A part of the Riot Grrrl scene, The Third Sex were significant in feminism's third wave and both influenced, and were influenced by, DIY culture.

Third Sex lyrics were often political and featured songs of heartbreak and hidden relationships. Playing with bands like Bikini Kill and Bratmobile, The Third Sex travelled across the country, performing in hundreds of local venues and building a large grassroots following.

The band's first eponymous 7-inch was released in 1995 on the Kill Rock Stars label, followed by their debut album Card Carryin on Donna Dresch's Chainsaw Records in 1996. This record represented several years of live performance and songwriting. In the wake of these releases, Third Sex started headlining their own shows, including performing many benefits for gay and lesbian youth clubs.

Sharylyn Menard joined on drums for the 1998 EP, "No Heart", for Kaia Wilson's Mr. Lady Records, followed by second and final album Back To Go on Chainsaw records, which was compared to Sleater-Kinney by reviewer Nitsuh Abebe.

In 2010, The Third Sex reunited to play a benefit concert for Rock 'n' Roll Camp for Girls. This was the first time Walsh and Marshall had played together since 2000. They were joined by Joell LeBlanc, on drums.

== Discography ==
- "Third Sex" (KRS, 1995) – 3-track 7-inch
- Card Carryin' (Chainsaw, 1996) – LP/CD
- No Heart (Mr Lady, 1998) – 5-track 7-inch EP
- Back To Go (Chainsaw, 1999) – LP, CD
