= Cadallaca =

American indie rock band

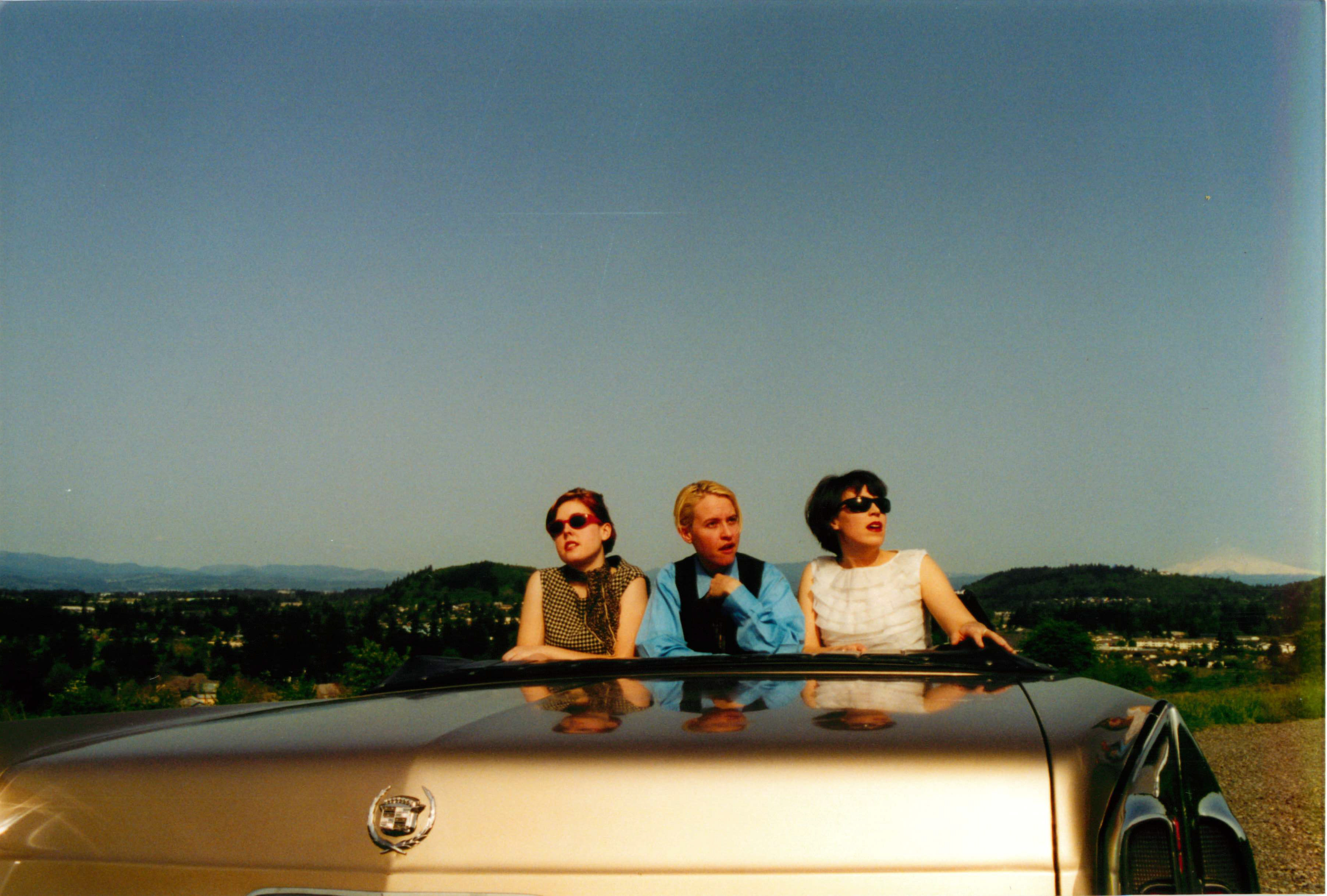
- Cadallaca in 1998

Background information
- Years active: 1997–c. 2000
- Label: Kill Rock Stars
- Spinoff of: The Lookers; Sleater-Kinney
- Members: Corin Tucker sts Sarah Dougher

Cadallaca was an indie rock band formed at a party in Portland, Oregon, United States, in 1997. The group consisted of Corin Tucker of Sleater-Kinney (vocals and guitar), Sarah Dougher of The Lookers (vocals and Farfisa organ), and sts, also of the Lookers (drums). The three women in the band adopted the nicknames Kissy, Dusty, and Junior. The band was often described as being an old-fashioned girl group, in the tradition of such acts as the Shangri-Las, with a feminist rhetoric.

Cadallaca released two releases (one album and one EP) during their history. The first, Introducing Cadallaca, was released by K Records in 1998. Their second release, an EP titled Out West, was released in 1999 by Kill Rock Stars. Songs from these albums have also been featured on two Kill Rock Stars compilations.
