= Chainsaw Records =

Record label

- Founded: 1991
- Founder: Donna Dresch
- Genre: Queercore
- Country of origin: United States
- Location: Portland, Oregon

Chainsaw Records is an independent record label run by Donna Dresch that is devoted to Queercore bands. The label is in Portland, Oregon. It is not linked to Chainsaw Records, UK.

== History ==
Chainsaw began life as a zine published by Donna Dresch in the late 1980s. Musicians and writers featured in the zine included Lois Maffeo, Jena von Brücker, Juliana Lueking, Candice Pederson, G.B. Jones and Larrybob. Chainsaw was one of the seminal queercore zines that, along with J.D.s and Homocore, helped define the movement.

"In 1991...Chainsaw developed from a zine into a record label. This began simply enough when she made a compilation cassette of her favourite bands and started to sell these while on tour with Fifth Column", writes Amy Spencer in DIY: The Rise of Lo-Fi Culture. In 1994 Chainsaw began to release LPs and singles, beginning with the release of The Fakes (featuring members of Bikini Kill, The Need and Nation of Ulysses ), the Frumpies and the first Team Dresch LP, Personal Best. This was followed by a co-release with Candy Ass Records, the double LP/CD compilation, Free to Fight. "The label established itself as a vital element of the queercore scene..." says Spencer, as Chainsaw then began to release records by a variety of queer mainly women artists. Of note is the fact that many bands, such as Sleater-Kinney, have been able to put out their initial recordings on the label. As well, the website for Chainsaw, and in particular its message board, have fostered a sense of community and provided a vehicle for expression by queers and music fans.

== Chainsaw artists ==
- Davies vs. Dresch
- Excuse 17
- The Fakes
- The Frumpies
- Heartless Martin
- Heavens to Betsy
- Infinite Xs
- Kaia
- Longstocking
- The Need
- No. 2
- Show Me the Pink
- Sleater-Kinney
- Team Dresch
- Third Sex
- Tracy and the Plastics

== See also ==
- List of record labels
