= Kaia Wilson =

American musician

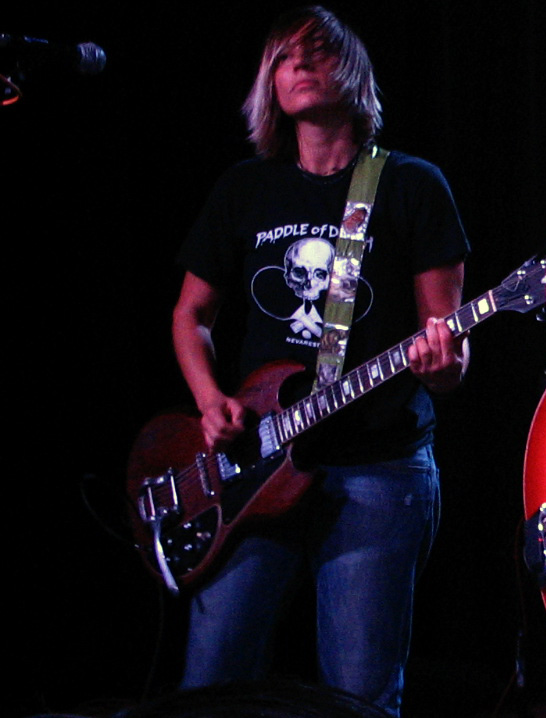
- Kaia Wilson performing with Team Dresch in Seattle on September 20, 2009

Background information
- Born: Kaia Lynn Wilson; 1974 (age 51–52); Portland, Oregon, U.S
- Genres: Punk rock, riot grrrl
- Occupation: Musician
- Instruments: vocals, guitar
- Formerly of: Adickdid; Team Dresch; The Butchies
- Spouse: Nicole J. Georges (m. 2020; div. 2024)

Kaia Lynn Wilson (born 1974) is an American musician from Portland, Oregon, best known as a founding member of both Team Dresch, a revered 1990s queercore punk band, and The Butchies, a pop-rock spin-off from her solo work. In addition to singing, songwriting and guitar, Wilson co-established and operated Mr. Lady Records from 1996 to 2004.

== Career ==
=== Musician ===
Wilson, born in 1974, was raised in the small town of Jasper, Oregon. As a teenager, Wilson was a member of the band Adickdid, which was distributed by several labels including Yoyo Records and Kill Rock Stars. From there, she went on to Team Dresch, in which she shared singing and songwriting duties with Jody Bleyle. Shortly after Team Dresch released their second album, Captain My Captain, in 1996, Wilson left the group and released a solo acoustic album entitled Kaia. Her second solo album, Ladyman, featured Team Dresch drummer Melissa York, who would later join Wilson in The Butchies.

In 1998, several songs from Kaia were rerecorded and appeared on the debut album of her newest band, The Butchies. The Butchies boasted a more pop-oriented rock sound, occasionally delving into acoustic music and even electronic dance tracks. The group recorded four albums before their break-up in early 2005, when they announced an indefinite "hiatus" on their website and thanked their fans. The Butchies reunited for a single show that November when all three group members happened to be back in Durham, North Carolina, at the same time.

Wilson has continued to release solo work. She reunited with Team Dresch for several live shows since 2004. She occasionally performs as a guitarist in Amy Ray's live band.

Wilson contributed an essay, To All You Genius Future Songwriters, to the 2008 book Rock N' Roll Camp for Girls, which provided advice to aspiring female rock musicians.

=== Business ===
In 1996, she founded Mr. Lady Records along with then-girlfriend Tammy Rae Carland. The label housed a variety of bands and artists, including Le Tigre, Tami Hart, Sarah Dougher, The Haggard, and Electrelane. The record label was officially dissolved in 2004.

=== Athletics ===
Wilson competed in the sport of table tennis at the Summer 2010 Gay Games in Cologne, Germany.

== Discography ==
=== Solo (as Kaia) ===
- Kopi 7-inch EP (1993, Little Brother Records]
- Kaia or Finally A Dyke Album for the Whole Family LP (1996, Chainsaw Records)
- Ladyman LP (1998, Mr. Lady Records)
- The World's Greatest Haircut split 7-inch single with Sarah Dougher (1999, Heartcore Records / Mr. Lady Records)
- Oregon LP (2002, Mr. Lady Records)
- Godmakesmonkeys LP (2008, Jealous Butcher Records)
- Two Adult Women in Love LP (2012, Jealous Butcher Records)

== See also ==
- List of LGBT people from Portland, Oregon
