= Candy Ass Records =

American record label

- Founder: Jody Bleyle
- Genre: Punk, queercore, riot grrrl
- Country of origin: United States
- Location: Portland, Oregon

Candy Ass Records was an independent record label in Portland, Oregon, that was run by Jody Bleyle, a member of the bands Team Dresch and Hazel and of the queercore bands Family Outing and Infinite Xs.

The label is best known for the 1995 release of the double LP compilation Free to Fight. Featuring all-women bands and musicians such as The Third Sex, Rebecca Gates of The Spinanes, Fifth Column, Containe, Heavens to Betsy, Excuse 17, Lois, Cheesecake and Team Dresch, all contributing songs dealing with women's safety, defense against harassment and rape and pertinent topics surrounding these issues. The recording also featured self-defense instructions led by Anna LoBianco and Staci Cotler, which were included in a 75-page illustrated booklet accompanying the LPs/CD. As well, the booklet contained a great variety of other contributions from women such as bell hooks, Sue P. Fox and others, in the form of stories, practical advice and poems, all dealing with self-defense.

Jody Bleyle is interviewed in the documentary film She's Real, Worse Than Queer speaking about Candy Ass Records and the release of Free to Fight, along with Alice Stagg, who contributed several segments on self-defense on the recording and accompanied Team Dresch on the tour promoting the release.

Candy Ass also co-released, with Chainsaw Records, the first Team Dresch LP, Personal Best, in 1994 and the band's second LP, Captain My Captain, in 1995. Jody Bleyle also released recordings by her other band Hazel.

After the release of Free to Fight, the label planned to issue several follow-up singles by various artists under the same name as the original compilation and dealing with the same issues. The first release, called Free to Fight #1, was a split single with Sleater-Kinney and Cypher in the Snow accompanied by self-defense tips. However, this first release was also to be the last, due to the label's financial constraints.

Aside from these endeavors the label also released separate recordings by artists such as The Lookers (with Sarah Dougher), Vegas Beat, and Cypher in the Snow.

== Roster ==
- Cheesecake
- Containe
- Cypher in the Snow
- Excuse 17
- Fifth Column
- Rebecca Gates
- Hazel
- Heavens to Betsy
- Heavy Johnson Trio
- Lois
- Lync
- The Lookers
- Mizzery
- New Bad Things
- Ovarian Trolley
- Sleater-Kinney
- Sone
- Surf Maggots
- Team Dresch
- The Third Sex
- Thirty Ought Six
- Vegas Beat
- Veronica

== See also ==
- List of record labels
- List of all-women bands
- Free to Fight
