= Yoyo A Go Go =

Former music festival in Olympia, Washington, United States

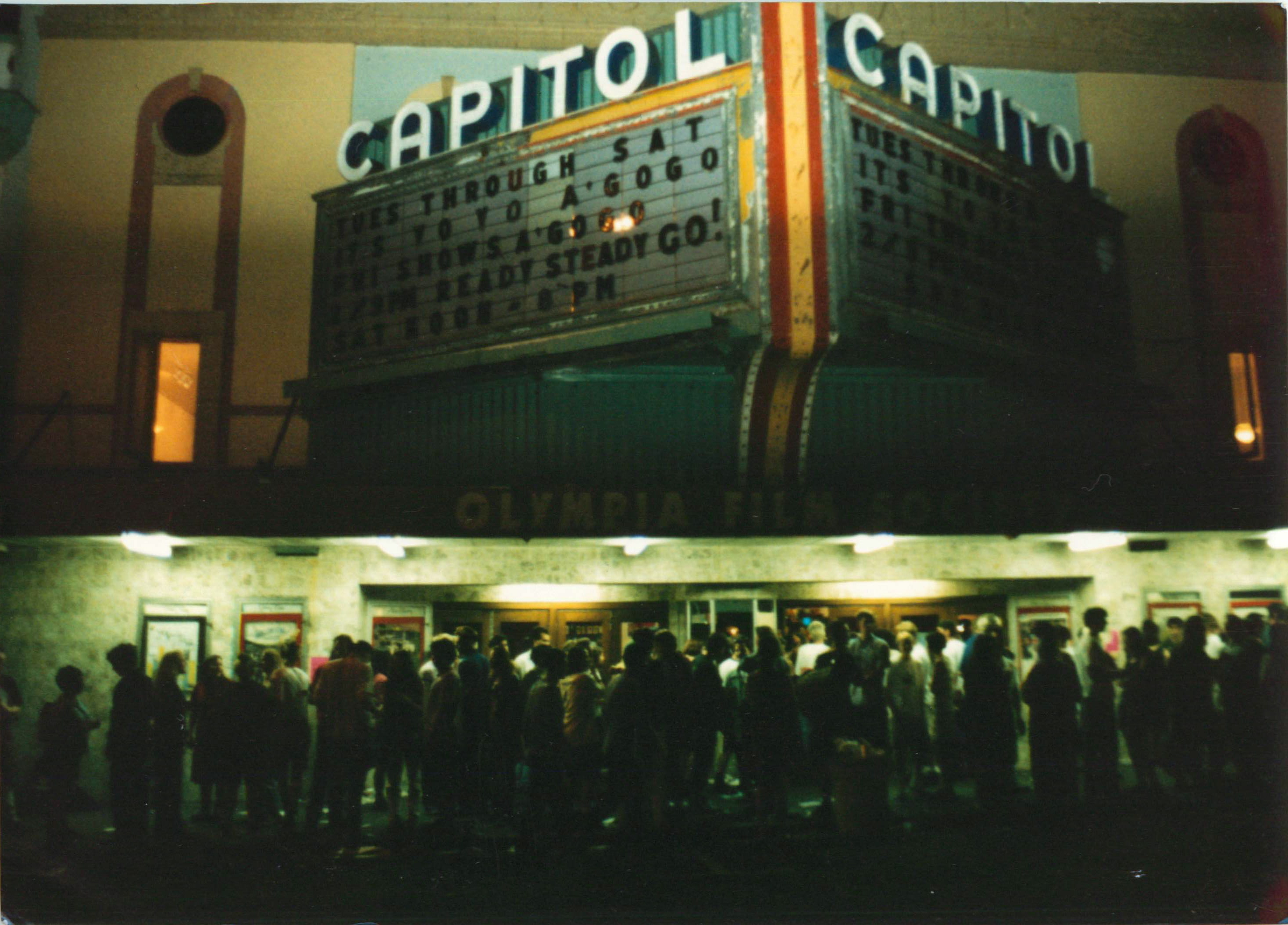
- Festival events were based in the Capitol Theater
- Genre: Punk rock, indie rock, queercore, twee pop, cuddlecore
- Dates: July 1994, 1997, 1999 and 2001
- Locations: Olympia, Washington, United States
- Years active: Original festival held in 1994; successor events held in 1997, 1999, and 2001
- Founders: Pat Maley; Michelle Noel; Kent Oiwa; Pat Castaldo

Yoyo A Go Go, usually abbreviated to Yoyo and often typeset in various ways, (Note: The official name of the festival as printed on the first live album is Yoyo A Go Go, but this has varied over time. Later iterations, particularly in the media and in popular usage, often hyphenate the name in different ways (as in Yo-Yo and Go-Go, and occasionally Yo-Yo-A-Go-Go) and the capitalization often varies.) was an independent music festival in Olympia, Washington, United States. It was first held in 1994 and followed by successor festivals in 1997, 1999, and 2001. Five- and six-day concert marathons featured dozens of punk and indie rock acts stacked back to back, as well as a variety of associated entertainment and small-scale local retail. The concerts took place at the historic Capitol Theater and showcased performers from the local Olympia music scene, while also including national and international artists.

== Background ==
The first Yoyo enterprise was a recording studio built inside Olympia's Capitol Theater by audio engineer Pat Maley. By 1992, Maley had formed the Yoyo record label and released the compilation Throw (reissued on CD in 2001) which included tracks by area musicians. Maley eventually decided to initiate an independent musical event, inspired by Olympia's earlier International Pop Underground Convention (IPU), a highly regarded 1991 festival that has been deemed "a watershed moment in indie rock". After the unexpected international success of area favorites Nirvana and their album Nevermind just months later, there was a widespread feeling in the scene that "homespun events" like the IPU simply could not take place anymore.

"Punker than punk punk that will punk you like you've never punked before."
– Yoyo mission statement,
1994 program guide

A musician himself, Maley organized the Yoyo festival with help from drummer Kent Oiwa, graphic designer Pat Castaldo, and local disc jockey Michelle Noel. The guiding principle was the DIY ethic central to punk rock. In a press release for the festival, Maley declared: "Long ago, punk rock stopped being simply a noun that was young, loud, and proud. Now it's also a descriptive term that tries to explain the difference between the buy in/sell out culture that wakes us up every morning for work, and the culture so many of us make every day with our own hands".

The Yoyo festivals ran concurrently with another citywide event, the annual Lakefair festival. Yoyo organizers felt little sense of competition, and were inclined to believe Lakefair, with its more traditional style of fireworks and parade, would be a complementary affair and "add to the overall sense of fun". From the first festival, audience members and performers marched together as a contingent ("The Throw Team") in the Lakefair Parade.

== Themes and styles ==
The crush of performances squeezed into five- or six-day festivals meant most shows were limited to about thirty minutes. For this reason, some observers criticized Yoyo for a lack of focus: "The breadth of musical styles – and musical abilities – works against appreciating any one band". Candice Pedersen, co-owner of K Records and another key Yoyo organizer, explained that the point of the festival was not to maximize publicity or sales, but to share and enjoy a communal endeavor: "[S]ee all the bands, have a good time, meet a lot of people, and treat each other well". The mutual support among artists and audience was seen by many as a hallmark of the Olympia music scene and one of the keys to its growth and endurance.

Continuing the IPU's efforts at scene-building, Yoyo attracted participants for whom stage-sharing was acceptable and professional competition was virtually unknown. For its polite performers – and the rapt audiences who lavished attention on them – Yoyo has been called "the friendliest punk fest", a trait which earned it one magazine's gentle chiding as a "punk rock slumber party".

Another emblematic feature of Yoyo was the ubiquity of female musicians. All-female bands (or female-led ones) were commonplace, even more so than at the IPU in 1991. The IPU had heralded the advent of the riot grrrl movement with opening night festivities billed as "Girl Night", but Yoyo festivals cemented this as a feature of the Olympia scene: female bands were "a given, not a special attraction". Though its musical styles were far-flung, the Olympia community that populated Yoyo was most often linked to twee pop and cuddlecore.

== Yoyo 1994 ==
As described in SPIN, "the first Yoyo blossomed in the damp heat that followed Seattle's grunge explosion." The Olympia scene was riding a wave of interest from major media who were giving close scrutiny to the Pacific Northwest in the wake of Nirvana's international success. The first Yoyo festival was a five-day affair, July 12–16, 1994.

Dozens of independent bands played at Yoyo 1994 including Beck, Bikini Kill, Heavens to Betsy, Mary Lou Lord, Team Dresch, Lois, Go Sailor, the Spinanes, Mecca Normal, Some Velvet Sidewalk, the Halo Benders, Cub, Slant 6, Neutral Milk Hotel, Unwound, and Tattle Tale. Avant-garde rockers Deerhoof played one of their first shows at the festival, and were quickly signed to record a single for Kill Rock Stars. Several visiting Japanese bands were also part of the bill, including Bloodthirsty Butchers. The roster was publicized as a mixture of bands from "around the corner and around the world."

Making an unscheduled appearance were Krist Novoselic and Dave Grohl, in their first public performance together since the death of Kurt Cobain in April. The pair played a set with the Stinky Puffs, led by ten-year-old Simon Timony, and joined by Ira Kaplan (of Yo La Tengo) and Jad Fair. A solemn moment for the festival came when Timony offered a memorial song he wrote for Cobain: "'You rode off into the sun / but I love you anyway,' he sang in a preteen falsetto, while Novoselic towered behind him, playing stone-faced."

A double album containing almost two hours of live performances, Yo-Yo A Go-Go, was released by Yoyo on August 20, 1996.

== Yoyo 1997 ==
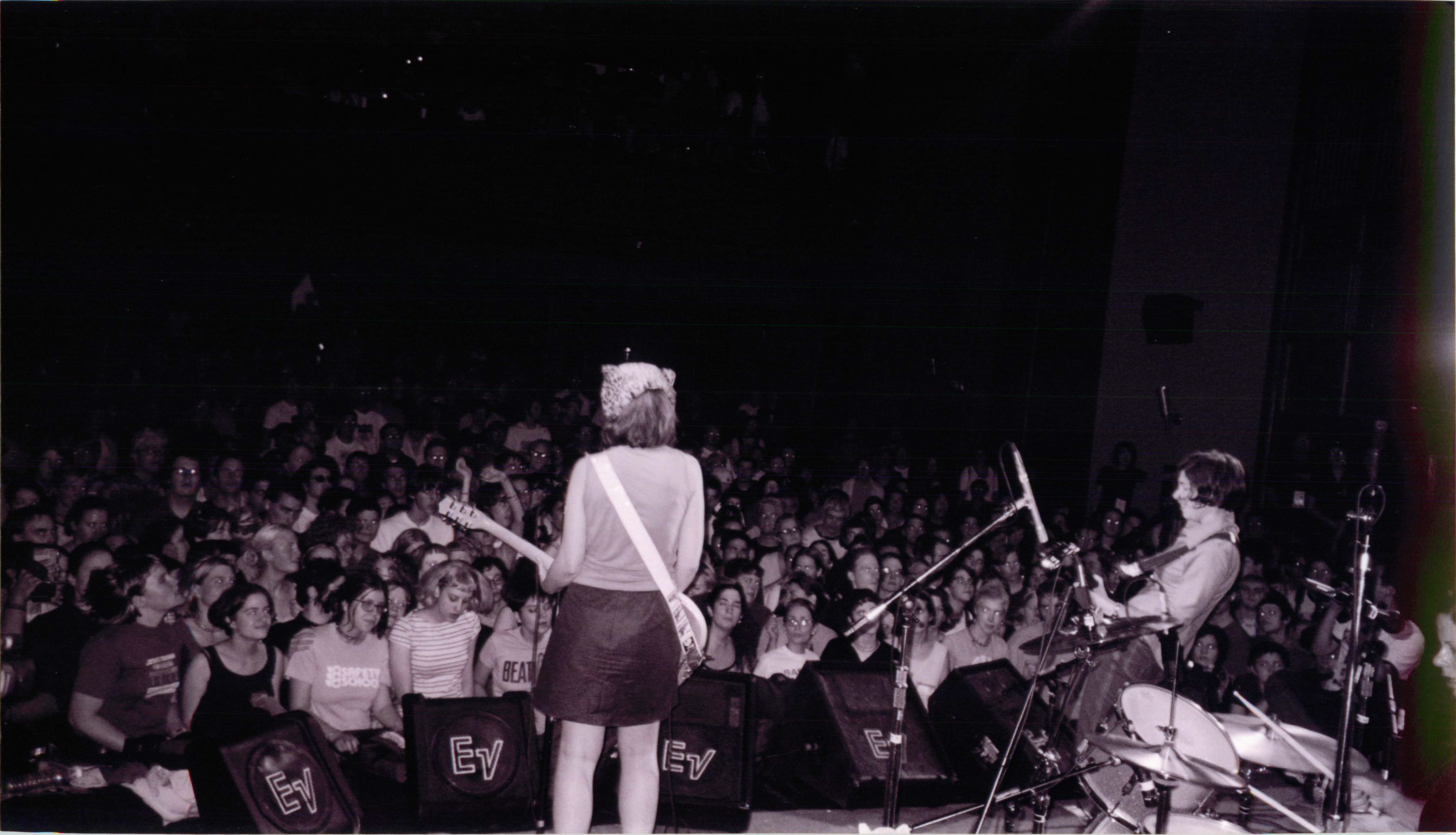
Sleater-Kinney onstage at Yoyo

"The continued presence of kitty-cat iconography and strummy guitar lullabies at Yoyo 1997 suggests a wistful nostalgia for Olympia's original love-rock days". Over fifty bands played, including once again several visiting Japanese bands such as Copass Grinders and Kirihito. Headliners included Sleater-Kinney, Modest Mouse, Karp, Unwound, Mirah, Cold Cold Hearts, Murder City Devils, The Softies, The Crabs, Elliott Smith and Built to Spill.

Among the varied entertainment was an a cappella performance piece by artist Nikki McClure; a puppeteers' rendition of The Gong Show; a string quartet conducted by composer Timothy Brock; a ukulele recital by Khaela Maricich; and an outdoor nature walk designed specifically for punks. Festival attendees were also treated to special movie screenings offered by the Olympia Film Society and an afternoon show by the campy, all-female troupe Cha Cha Cabaret, led by riot grrrl activist Jen Smith (under the stage name "Lady Hand Grenade").

A compilation of live recordings from the 1997 festival was released on Yoyo Recordings in 1999 under the title Yoyo A Go Go – Another Live Compilation – July 15–20, 1997.

== Yoyo 1999 ==
The 1999 festival was held July 13–18, and featured musical performances by Sleater-Kinney and Elliott Smith. Negativland appeared at the festival and played their first live set in six years, while Bratmobile arrived as part of a reunion tour, having broken up several years earlier. In total, over fifty bands played over the six-day event, including Make-Up, Dub Narcotic Sound System, The Donnas, Quasi, Tullycraft, Dead Moon, Marine Research, Thrones, Bonfire Madigan, and Mecca Normal.

Pearl Jam singer Eddie Vedder made a guest appearance with C Average and took part in their costumed tribute set to The Who. Elliott Smith played the festival's final set, and his celebrated performance was released on DVD in 2004.

The live album, Yoyo A GoGo 1999, was released in 2001. The album features twenty live tracks by festival performers, followed by a zestful five-minute recording of Negativland leading the crowd in a recitation of Casey Kasem's notorious and profanity-streaked diatribe: "This all means diddly-shit! Who gives a shit . . . diddly-shit! This is American Top 40 bullshit!". The CD's communal finale has been described as the "collective Yoyo a Go Go 'fuck-you' to the mainstream recording industry and corporate radio".

== Yoyo 2001 ==
The fourth Yoyo festival was held July 17–22, 2001, and once again included over fifty musical acts, as well as spoken word performances, art shows and seminars. Headlining participants included Bratmobile, The Need, The Gossip, C Average, Dead Moon, and Sarah Dougher. Also appearing were Erase Errata, the Evaporators, Mark Robinson, the Microphones, the Mountain Goats, The Cannanes, Tracy and the Plastics, Mecca Normal, and the Selby Tigers.

== Legacy ==
Yoyo festivals were always inclusive of the LGBT community, and since the original 1994 event always proudly sported a "solid queer presence". In its tradition, a later series of annual festivals dedicated to queercore began in Olympia in 2002 under the name Homo-A-Go-Go.

Filmmakers Elina Shatkin, Cris Dupont, and Thomas Logoreci collaborated on a documentary about the 1999 and 2001 festivals, Try This At Home, which was released in 2015. Yoyo and its participating artists are prominent features of A Revolution You Can Dance To: Indie Music in the Northwest, an exhibition (2016–2017) at the Washington State History Museum.

== See also ==
- List of punk rock festivals
