= International Pop Underground Convention =

Rock music festival

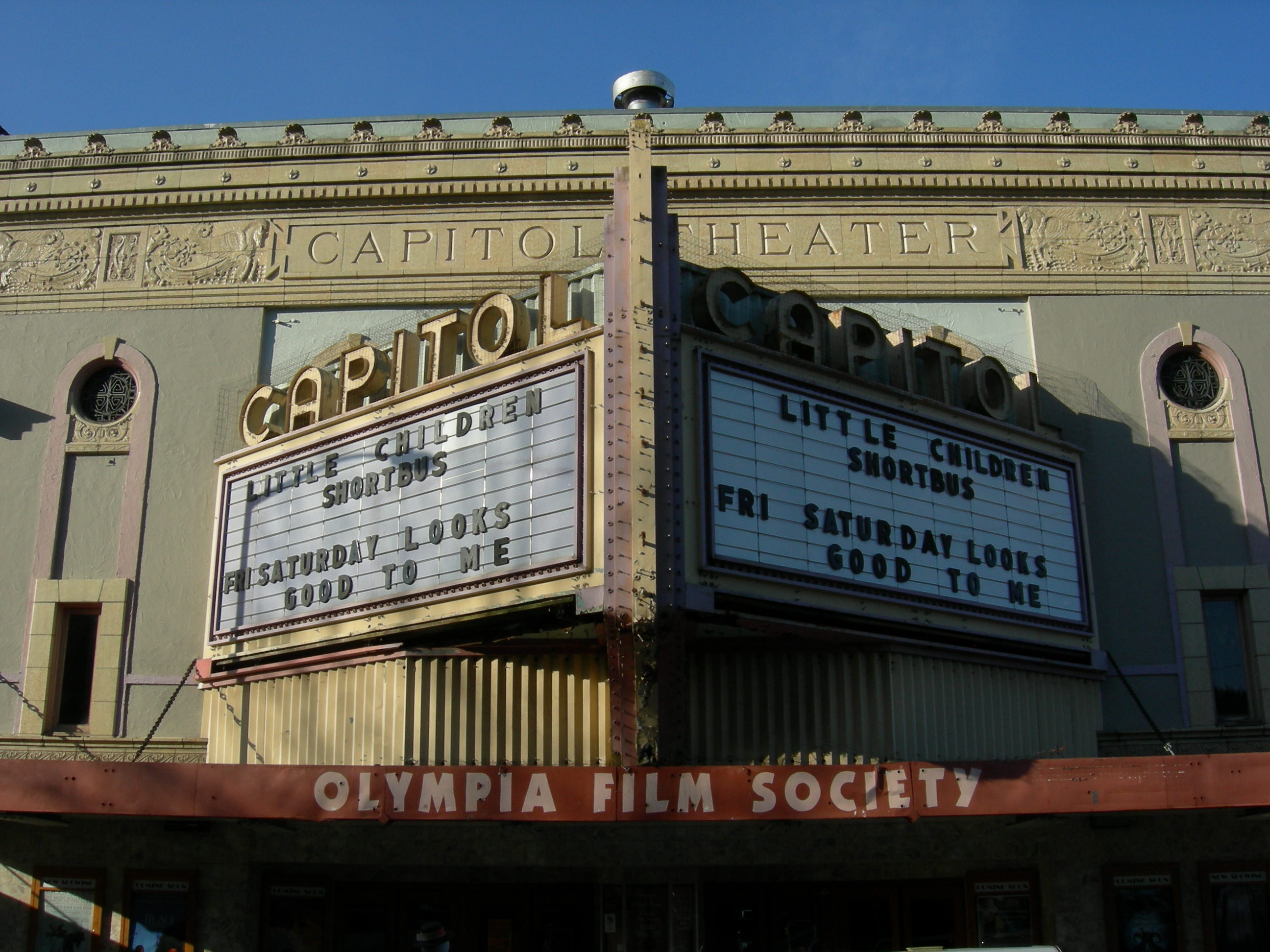
Olympia's Capitol Theater (seen here in 2007) served as the Convention's main stage.

The International Pop Underground Convention (or IPU) was a 1991 punk and alternative rock music festival in Olympia, Washington. The six-day convention centered on a series of performances at the Capitol Theater. Throughout August 20–25, 1991, an exceptionally large number of independent bands played, mingled and collaborated at the Capitol and other venues within the Olympia music scene. A compilation of live music from the event was released later by the local record label K Records.

== Origins ==
The Convention was organized largely by musician and K Records owners Calvin Johnson and Candice Pedersen. An active participant in the local music scene, Johnson also performed at the event as part of the group Beat Happening. The concept of the festival grew from more modest K Records events like all-night dance parties and barbecues at Pedersen's home on Steamboat Island. Few people expected it to succeed, or achieve much recognition: as Johnson explains, "It was sort of an audacious idea of doing something like that. We had hardly sold any records ever, and no one had ever cared much about anything that we did. It just seemed like if just the people who made the music showed up, that would be a success."

== Theme and style ==
The theme of the festival focused on the artists' independence, self-sufficiency, and DIY ethic: the entire affair manifested a "fierce resistance to corporate takeover." As described by Bratmobile singer Allison Wolfe, "The whole point of what we were doing was DIY, create it yourself, taking over the means of production for ourselves, and creating something ourselves." One of the festivals' prime tenets was "No lackeys to the corporate ogre allowed."

Stylistically the Convention resembled more of a public party than a commercial concert series. As festival organizer and K Records co-founder Candice Pedersen said, "It was a way to combine music and dancing and fun without all the pseudo-business stuff.... We tried to keep passes as low as possible, thirty-five dollars for five days, just enough to make sure the bands and venues got paid. It was really very community oriented.... A lot of people came and didn't pay and just hung out. And that was totally encouraged; if you wanted to be there, you were part of the community."

== Events and participants ==
Approximately fifty different bands played stage shows during the Convention. The most visible performances took place at the Capitol Theater but other local venues participated as well, and many shows arose as impromptu performances at record stores, house parties, and other spaces. Among the players were Fugazi; Bikini Kill; Fastbacks; Built to Spill; Some Velvet Sidewalk; Melvins; Unwound; L7; and Shadowy Men on a Shadowy Planet. Beyond musical performances, the Convention also fostered an eclectic variety of arts-related activities ranging from poetry readings to cakewalk dances and even a Planet of the Apes movie marathon.

=== Girl Night ===
The festival's first night was a set of shows officially titled Love Rock Revolution Girl Style Now. A long list of female punk and queercore bands played, including Bratmobile, Tobi Vail solo, Jean Smith of Mecca Normal, Kicking Giant, Heavens to Betsy, 7 Year Bitch, Nikki McClure, Suture (Kathleen Hanna, Sharon Cheslow, Dug E. Bird), Rose Melberg, The Spinanes, and Lois Maffeo's early band, "Courtney Love". The concept for the opening night was designed and promoted by a group of volunteers led by Maffeo, KAOS disc jockey Michelle Noel, and local entrepreneur Margaret Doherty. The event provided an energetic kickoff to the proceedings and achieved a near-legendary status among riot grrrls, becoming known simply as "Girl Night".

== EP series and live album ==
The Convention inherited its name from a long-running series of 7-inch EP releases by K entitled International Pop Underground. This series was a forum for independent and DIY bands, exposing Pacific-Northwest-area favorites like The Softies, Chromatics, and Tiger Trap, while also including divergent musical contributions by Make-Up, Built to Spill, The Rondelles, Thatcher on Acid, Thee Headcoats, and many others. The series began in 1987 and continued long after the Convention itself, ultimately issuing over 130 different editions. Of these, K has released two separate compilations: International Hip Swing (1993) and Project Echo (1996).

A retrospective of live music from the Convention itself was released by K Records in 1992. Produced by veteran Olympia engineer Patrick Maley, the album International Pop Underground Convention includes performances by twenty-one participant bands. Most of the music was captured live by the YoYo Recording Studio located inside the Capitol, while some of the tracks were recorded at two of the Convention's associated venues, the North Shore Surf Club and Capital Lake Park.

== Legacy ==
While Nirvana was away on tour, Kurt Cobain expressed his deep disappointment over being unable to attend the Convention where many of the bands developed important new friendships and found unexpected inspirations. The shows were a proving ground for many of the nascent artists of the time, and gave some of them – like Rose Melberg (on the cusp of forming Tiger Trap), Nikki McClure, and Heavens to Betsy's Corin Tucker – the first public appearance of their careers.

Recordmaker Slim Moon, who had just recently founded his own record label Kill Rock Stars, brought copies of one of his earliest records, the original Kill Rock Stars compilation which included tracks by Bikini Kill and Bratmobile. After the festival, the CD release was revised and expanded to showcase artists from the Convention.

The festival achieved respectable success in its goal of "fortifying the community's resolve for self-sufficiency". It has continued to influence the Pacific Northwest music scene ever since, serving as a model for future independent music festivals like Ladyfest and YoYo A Go Go. It had a particularly galvanizing effect on the riot grrrl movement and helped bring it to public prominence.

The IPU Convention and its participating artists figured heavily in A Revolution You Can Dance To: Indie Music in the Northwest, an exhibition (2016–17) at the Washington State History Museum. It has been widely regarded as a festival of exceptional musical value and artistic integrity, described by SPIN magazine as "the true Woodstock of the '90s."

== See also ==
- List of punk rock festivals
