= David Lester (musician) =

Canadian musician

David Lester is the guitar player in the Vancouver, Canada-based band Mecca Normal.

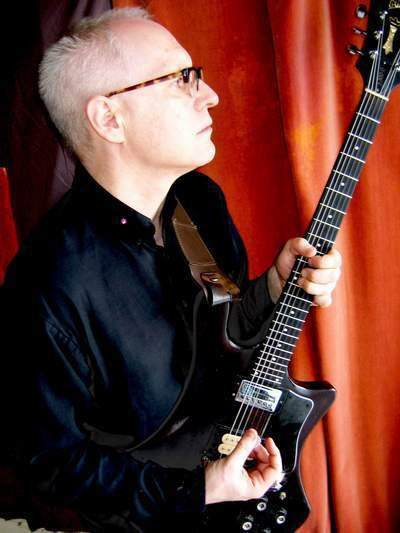
David Lester of Mecca Normal

Lester and singer Jean Smith formed the feminist punk rock duo in 1984.As a result of their collaboration, Mecca Normal is considered a forerunner and an inspiration to the 1990s politically charged riot grrrl and D-I-Y movements.

Mecca Normal's albums have been released on K Records, Matador Records, Kill Rock Stars and the band's own Smarten Up! Records—created in 1986 to release their first LP.

In 2007, Mecca Normal was named one of 10 famous Canadians you've never heard of by Canada's national newspaper, The Globe & Mail.

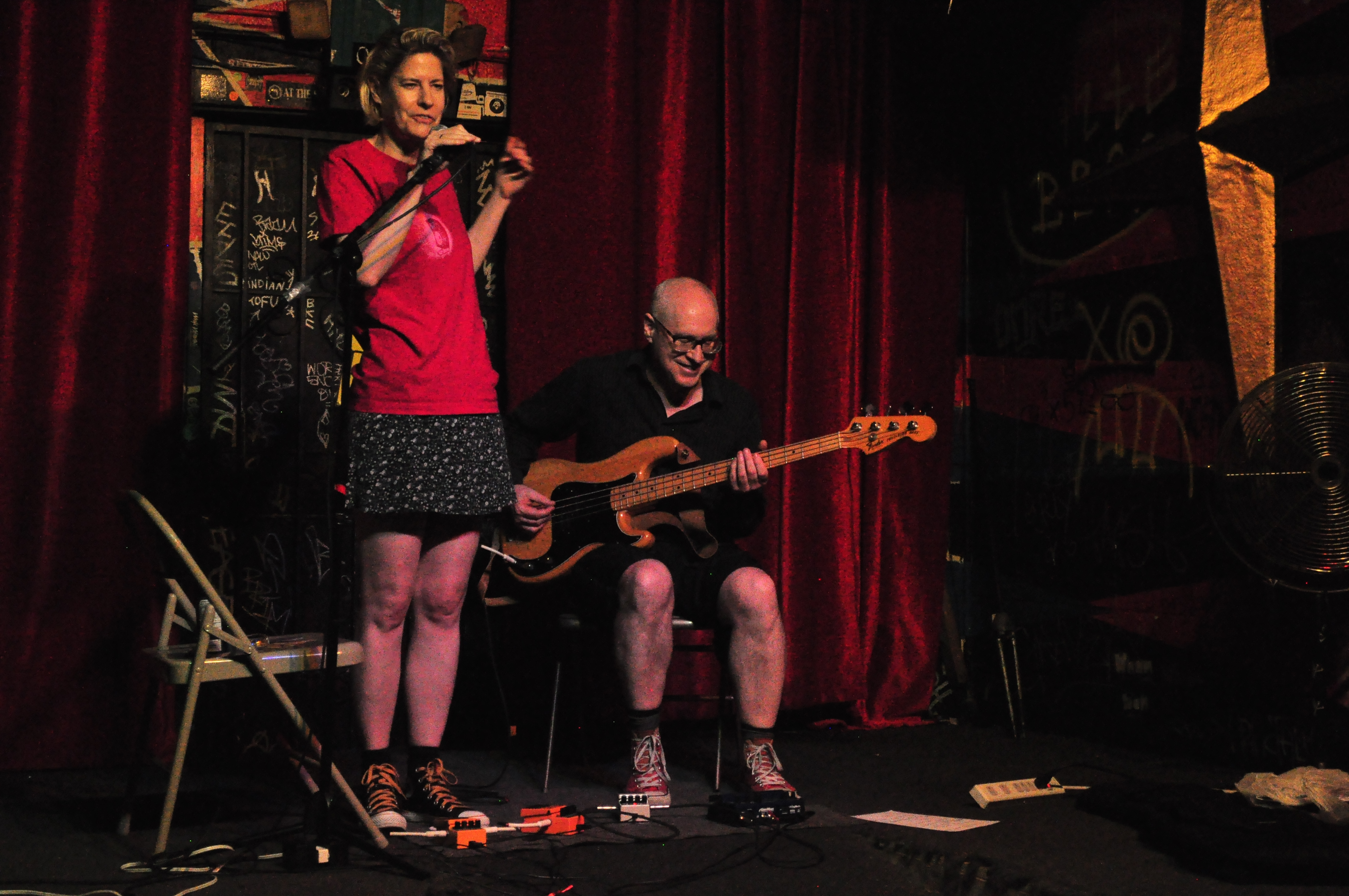
Lester with Wendy Atkinson at the 21st Olympia Experimental Music Festival (2015).

Lester has also collaborated with experimental bassist Wendy Atkinson to form the duo Horde of Two. They released their debut CD Guitar & Bass Actions on Smarten Up! & Get To The Point Records in 2009.

In 2011, Lester wrote and illustrated the graphic novel The Listener (Arbeiter Ring Publishing), a historical fiction exploring the power of art amidst the rise of the Nazi party in 1933 Germany.

In 2016, Mecca Normal's song "Man Thinks Woman" (1987) was included in Pitchfork's "The Story of Feminist Punk in 33 Songs: From Patti Smith to Bikini Kill, the songs that have crushed stereotypes and steered progress".

In 2019, Lester illustrated the graphic novel 1919: A Graphic History of the Winnipeg General Strike (Between The Lines Books), written by The Graphic History Collective. The book was published in German (Bahoe Books) and French (Between The Lines) editions.

Lester created a 5 x 3' mural for a 2019 permanent exhibit called Coal, Conflict and Community at Cumberland Museum & Archives depicting significant figures in the area's political and social history.

In 2019, The New York Times listed Mecca Normal's "I Walk Alone" as an essential song in their article, Riot Grrrl United Feminism and Punk. An Essential Listening Guide. 25 songs that fueled a rock revolution.

In 2020, Rolling Stone included Mecca Normal's "I Walk Alone" in its definitive "Riot Grrrl Album Guide," which highlighted foundational and essential music of the movement. The song's legacy was further recognized in 2025 when Rolling Stone ranked "I Walk Alone" at number 67 on its list of the "100 Best Protest Songs of All Time," describing it as a "proto-riot-grrrl pipe bomb."

== Graphic novels (2021–present) ==
In addition to his music career, Lester has established himself as an internationally recognized graphic novelist, specializing in stark, expressionistic black-and-white art that explores radical history, labor movements, and anti-racism.

Between 2021 and 2026, Lester expanded his portfolio with four major graphic histories published by Beacon Press, frequently collaborating with historians Marcus Rediker and Paul Buhle:

- Prophet Against Slavery: Benjamin Lay (2021, Beacon Press): profiles the 18th-century Quaker abolitionist, dwarf, and animal rights advocate.It has since been translated into French, German, Italian, and Spanish.
- Under the Banner of King Death: Pirates of the Atlantic (2023, Beacon Press): Explores the multi-racial, egalitarian, and resistant counter-cultures of 18th-century pirate ships.
- Revolution by Fire: New York's Afro-Irish Uprising of 1741 (2024, Beacon Press): Depicts an interracial rebellion of enslaved people, sailors, and laborers attempting to overthrow the colonial order in New York.
- The Black Schooner: Rebellion on the Amistad (2026, Beacon Press): A graphic history documenting the 1839 slave ship uprising. The work received a starred review from Library Journal, while Kirkus Reviews lauded Lester's "sketchy, heavily shadowed and roughly crosshatched" art style for giving the history "escapable immediacy".
