= Witchcraft Rebellion =

2001 studio album by Old Time Relijun

Studio album by Old Time Relijun
- Released: April 24, 2001
- Length: 33:38
- Label: K

Old Time Relijun chronology
Uterus and Fire (1999)	Witchcraft Rebellion (2001)	Varieties of Religious Experience (2003)

Professional ratings
Review scores
Source	Rating
AllMusic	4/5 stars
Pitchfork	8/10

Witchcraft Rebellion is a studio album by American band Old Time Relijun. It was released on April 24, 2001, by K Records.

== Track listing ==
Witchcraft Rebellion track listing
No.	Title	Length
1.	"Mystery Language"	3:44
2.	"Cuneiform"	2:39
3.	"Vampire Sushi"	3:15
4.	"Dark of the Male, Light of the Female"	2:38
5.	"Mercury Snake"	2:07
6.	"Two Crows"	2:29
7.	"Fermentatio"	1:51
8.	"King of Nothing"	1:44
9.	"The Book of Life and Crime"	3:25
10.	"Treasure Map"	2:04
11.	"Maenads in the Android Brothel"	1:42
12.	"Crocodile Theater"	2:01
13.	"Witchcraft Rebellion"	3:59
Total length:		33:38

== Personnel ==
- Arrington de Dionyso – electric guitar, vocals and bass clarinet
- Phil Elvrum – drums
- Aaron Hartman – stand up bass
