= Appetite for Extinction =

Studio album by Some Velvet Sidewalk
- Released: 1990
- Recorded: 1987–1989
- Genre: Experimental rock
- Length: 26:15
- Label: Communion/K

Some Velvet Sidewalk chronology
From Playground 'til Now (1988)	Appetite for Extinction (1990)	Avalanche (1992)

Appetite for Extinction is the second album by American experimental rock band Some Velvet Sidewalk, released in 1990.

== Critical reception ==
Professional ratings
Review scores
Source	Rating
AllMusic	4/5 stars

Trouser Press wrote that "between the epic grind of 'Snow' and the too-brief pop discourse of '20,000 Leagues', Some Velvet Sidewalk covers all of nerd-pop's bases, getting thrown out only when they unplug on the insufferably twee 'Crayons'." A "Review Revue" from DJs at KEXP had mixed opinions, one calling it awful while another called it "noisy, sloppy, spare & packed full of emotion... Fans of early Beat Happening & Mecca Normal may enjoy".

== Track listing ==
No.	Title	Length
1.	"Seasons"	2:26
2.	"Old Bridges"	1:41
3.	"Dinosaur"	2:26
4.	"Hurt."	3:22
5.	"Sidewalkin'"	2:22
6.	"Crayons"	1:25
7.	"Snow."	3:05
8.	"alright"	0:36
9.	"Moment"	2:31
10.	"Sidewalk and Sky"	0:45
11.	"Old Bridges (live)"	2:21
12.	"20,000 Leagues"	3:15
Total length:		26:15
