= Avalanche (Some Velvet Sidewalk album) =

Studio album by Some Velvet Sidewalk
- Released: 1992
- Recorded: 1992
- Genre: Experimental rock
- Length: 33:07
- Label: K
- Producer: Steve Fisk

Some Velvet Sidewalk chronology
Appetite for Extinction (1990)	Avalanche (1992)	I Scream (EP) (1993)

Avalanche is the third album by the American band Some Velvet Sidewalk, released in 1992.

== Critical reception ==
Professional ratings
Review scores
Source	Rating
AllMusic	3/5 stars
Robert Christgau	(neither)

Trouser Press noted, "Although [Al] Larsen's nasal delivery can be one of the band's greater charms—especially when he's struggling, à la [Jonathan] Richman, to fit in as many words per bar as possible—his ineptitude as a 'singer' reveals itself again when the band turns down on 'Little Wishes'." The Rocket countered, "Larsen always seems to be singing a tad off key, but when he's fully screaming and you can almost see his face turn red and his glasses fog up it doesn't matter if he's a lot off key 'cause it sounds so damn good." Jersey Beat said that the band revels "in a kind of studied amateurishness".

== Track listing ==
1. "Avalanche"
2. "Loch Ness"
3. "Curiosity"
4. "Froggy"
5. "Peaches"
6. "Little Wishes"
7. "Deep Sea Green"
8. "No Real Home"
9. "Alien"
10. "Right/Wrong"
11. "Ice Cream Overdrive"
