= Whirlpool (Some Velvet Sidewalk album) =

Studio album by Some Velvet Sidewalk
- Released: 1993
- Recorded: 1993
- Genre: Experimental rock
- Length: 31:22
- Label: K Records
- Producer: Steve Fisk

Some Velvet Sidewalk chronology
I Scream (EP) (1993)	Whirlpool (1993)	Shipwreck (1995)

Professional ratings
Review scores
Source	Rating
AllMusic	4.5/5 stars

Whirlpool is the fourth album by Some Velvet Sidewalk.

== Track listing ==
1. "Whirlpool"
2. "Mouse & Rat"
3. "Oscar Says"
4. "One Bear Alone"
5. "Big City Plans"
6. "How Will I?"
7. "I Blame You"
8. "Shame"
9. "Geological"
10. "Kicking: Giant"

== Credits ==
Some Velvet Sidewalk

- Al Larsen - vocals & guitar
- Martin Bernier - bass
- Don Blair - drums

Guests

- Robin Boomer (cello on "Oscar Says")
- Steve Fisk (organ on "Big City Plans")
- Steve McGraph (trumpet on "Big City Plans")
