= I Scream (EP) =

EP by Some Velvet Sidewalk
- Released: 1993
- Recorded: 1992
- Genre: Experimental rock
- Length: 20:28
- Label: K Records
- Producer: Steve Fisk

Some Velvet Sidewalk chronology
Avalanche (1992)	I Scream (1993)	Whirlpool (1994)

Professional ratings
Review scores
Source	Rating
AllMusic	3/5 stars

I Scream is an EP by Some Velvet Sidewalk, released in 1993.

== Track listing ==
1. "Ice Cream Overdrive"
2. "Shame"
3. "I Blame You"
4. "Ice Cream Overdrive (Frozen Solid Mix)"
5. "Shame (Misty Lavender Mix)"

== Credits ==
Some Velvet Sidewalk

- Al Larsen - voice & guitar
- Martin Bernier - bass
- Don Blair - drums

Additional personnel

- "Ice Cream Overdrive" supervised by Calvin Johnson
- "I Blame You" engineered by Stuart Hallerman
- Remixes courtesy of Steve Fisk
- Vocal clip on "Shame (Misty Lavender Mix)" by Stephen Jesse Bernstein
