= Critters Encore =

2026 album by Some Velvet Sidewalk

Studio album by Some Velvet Sidewalk
- Released: June 26, 2026
- Studios: Mobile Control, Olympia, Washington
- Genre: Experimental rock
- Length: 32:24
- Labels: K, Perennial

Some Velvet Sidewalk chronology
Original Love Rock Masters (1999)	Critters Encore (2026)

Critters Encore is the eighth studio album by American experimental rock band Some Velvet Sidewalk released on June 26, 2026. This became their first release since 1999's Original Love Rock Masters and first new album since their reunion in 2025. A single, "Don't Fuck With Your Luck" was released in March of 2026 alongside the announcement of the album.

== Reception ==
Treble Zine said the album "Some Velvet Sidewalk have returned right when their own oddness is a sought-after treasure, with no ounce of their idiosyncrasy lost in the intervening decades". Fred Thomas of AllMusic gave the album four out of five stars and said "even with nearly three decades away, Some Velvet Sidewalk picks up with all the intensity and unique, unrestrained weirdness as ever".

== Tracklisting ==
No.	Title	Length
1.	"Don't Fuck With Your Luck"	2:31
2.	"Walking/Falling"	4:09
3.	"So Be It, Bro"	3:16
4.	"Rabbits Running"	1:30
5.	"Howwling"	4:14
6.	"Is Damaged"	3:35
7.	"Snow (live)"	3:35
8.	"Critters Encore"	2:19
9.	"Velvet Rabbit Portal"	6:08
10.	"This Minute"	2:21
Total length:		32:24

== Credits ==
Adapted from the notes on Bandcamp.

- Al Larsen - vocals, guitar
- Don Blair - drums
- James Maeda - bass (tracks 1, 5, and 10), guitar (tracks 2, 4, and 8)
- Matt Vanek - bass (tracks 3, 6, and 7)
- Jason Dean - keyboard, vocals (track 6)
- Rich Jensen - vocals (track 6)
- J.C. Galegher - mixing engineer (tracks 7 and 9), bass (track 9)
- Hayes Waring - recording engineer, mixing engineer
- Wayne Bliss - tracking
- Amy Dragon - mastering engineer
- Capt. Tripps Ballsington - mixing engineer
- Steve Fisk - mixing engineer (track 3)
- Nich Wilbur - recording engineer (track 7)
