= Music of the Pacific Northwest =

Collection of musical styles

The music of the Pacific Northwest encompasses many musical styles and genres from traditional to contemporary in the Pacific Northwest. The Pacific Northwest has contributed to the greater musical canon through its notable innovations in rock and indie music via influential bands such as Nirvana, The Microphones, The Sonics, and Elliott Smith. Genres that are considered to have originated from the Pacific Northwest include Grunge and Riot Grrrl.

== Native American and First Nations ==
Song and dance were notable elements of precontact Northwest culture. The abundant food supply for coastal tribes like the Tlingit, Haida, Tsimishan, Kwakiutl, Makah, Quinault, and Coast Salish peoples is credited for allowing a settled lifestyle with elaborate artistic expression including woven clothing and basketry, communal longhouses and dance and music. Some dances, songs and stories were owned by a particular culture and used in association with potlatches and other important community events. Cultural preservation efforts in the 21st century include Makah and Yakama music.

== Modern ==
In modern times, the Northwest is known for largely for its contributions to Punk Rock and indie music, especially Grunge, Riot grrrl, and alternative rock. There is also a historically strong interest in folk music and many musicians from the region have made notable contributions to the contemporary folk revivalism movement.

=== Folk ===
Folk music from the region traditionally takes stock of Pacific Northwest in lyrical references, such as the local history, the landscape, and in the spirit of transcendentalism, which has historical roots in the exploration and settlement of the Pacific Northwest. The music is documented in Songs of the Pacific Northwest by Phil Thomas (1979), Washington Songs and Lore (written for Washington Centennial Commission in 1988) and The Rainy Day Songbook (published by Whatcom Museum of History and Art in 1978) both by Linda Allen. Pacific Northwest folk music has also been a significant influence on modern acoustic rock musicians from the region who blend rock and folk influences, including Elliott Smith and the musical projects of Phil Elverum.

==== Great Depression ====
Woody Guthrie's "Roll on Columbia", written in 1941, is the official Washington State folk song.

=== Jazz ===
Jazz artists from the Pacific Northwest include Ray Charles, Buddy Catlett, Bill Frisell, Ernestine Anderson, Larry Coryell, Jeff Lorber, Diane Schuur, Kenny G, Aaron Parks and Esperanza Spalding. The Seattle Repertory Jazz Orchestra is noted for its renditions of big band jazz music.

=== Heavy metal ===
The Pacific Northwest region – primarily Oregon, Washington, and British Columbia – has been host to a growing scene of Doom metal, Sludge metal and Stoner metal since the 1990s, influenced by the geographical origin of grunge music and a sound pioneered in part by legendary Washington band Melvins. Common visual themes include the region's cold, rainy, forested climate, and many bands utilize psychedelic imagery influenced by bands like Sleep, Karp and Harkonen. Musical styles often share crossover features with atmospheric/ambient black metal, drone metal, and post-metal as seen in Oregon's YOB, Agalloch, Witch Mountain, Red Fang, Washington's Lesbian, Earth, Sunn O))), Vancouver's Anciients, Astrakhan, and Aaron Turner project Sumac, among various others.

=== Pop ===
While the Pacific Northwest is not often known for pop music, pop musicians such as Bing Crosby, Quincy Jones, and Carly Rae Jepsen have hailed from the region. Jones, who came of age in Seattle and Bremerton in the Puget Sound region and is best known for his work with Michael Jackson, credits the region as the place where he was first "finding music".

=== Rock ===
In 1959–1960, Seattle's Dolton Records started to take off and local bands including The Kingsmen and Paul Revere and the Raiders became known as the Sea-Port Beat, later to be referred to as the Original Northwest Sound.

The region became famous as the hub of many of the alternative rock movements of the 1980s, 1990s, and 2000s. The indie label Sub Pop is associated with some of the most iconic Pacific Northwest acts, like Sleater-Kinney and The Postal Service, while Kill Rock Stars and K Records have hosted others including Beat Happening, Bikini Kill, Elliott Smith, and Modest Mouse. Indeed indie rock has made a stronghold in the Pacific Northwest due to prolific cities like Portland, Seattle, and Olympia. Numerous rock bands in the pacific northwest experiment with the use of feedback and abrasive effects like distortion and can be identified as Noise Rock. Notable examples of PNW-based noise rock bands include Lync, Unwound, and Melvins. KEXP is a popular and nationally noted Seattle-based public radio station that celebrates primarily indie rock music. The indie music scene was never contained just to the genre alternative rock, however, and many musicians from the Pacific Northwest became well-known indie folk musicians, such as Neko Case, The Decemberists and Loch Lomond. Likewise, indie pop, indietronica and indie rap music have seen PNW artists like Macklemore, Carly Rae Jepsen, Odesza, and Sir-Mix-A-Lot make notable contributions.

Notable rock and rock-adjacent bands originating from the Pacific Northwest include:

- Agalloch
- Alice in Chains
- Bikini Kill
- Blitzen Trapper
- Built to Spill
- Cherry Poppin Daddies
- The Dandy Warhols
- Death Cab for Cutie
- The Decemberists
- DOA
- Doug and the Slugs
- Elliott Smith
- Everclear
- The Wailers
- Foo Fighters
- Front Line Assembly
- Heart
- Jimi Hendrix
- Jimmie Rodgers
- The Kingsmen
- Macklemore
- Merrilee Rush
- The Microphones
- Modest Mouse
- Mother Mother
- MxPx
- The New Pornographers
- Nirvana
- Nu Shooz
- Odesza
- Pearl Jam
- Pedro the Lion
- Pink Martini
- Poison Idea
- The Postal Service
- The Presidents of the United States of America
- Quarterflash
- Queensrÿche
- Red Fang
- Rickie Lee Jones
- Robert Cray
- Screaming Trees
- Septic Death
- Sir-Mix-A-Lot
- Skinny Puppy
- Sleater-Kinney
- The Sonics
- Soundgarden
- Subhumans
- The Ventures
- Unwound
- Wolves in the Throne Room

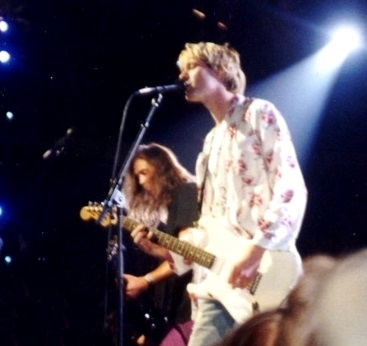
Nirvana performing circa 1992

=== Grunge ===
Grunge was a musical movement in the Rock genre originating in Seattle and Olympia, Washington in the mid-1980s which rose to prominence in the early 1990s with the releases of landmark albums such as Nirvana's Nevermind and Pearl Jam's Ten. Grunge is characterized sonically by its use of heavy guitars, often paired with distortion, and lyrically by its discussion of depression, substance abuse, and self-isolation. These themes were influenced by the dreary weather of the area and were used as a way for the youth to resist the conservative cultural swing that came with the Reagan administration.

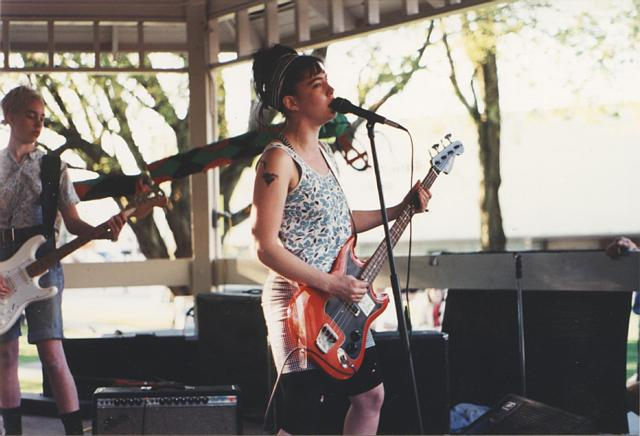
Bikini Kill performing in Olympia, WA, 1991

=== Riot Grrrl ===
The feminist underground punk movement known as Riot grrrl is considered to have been created in Olympia, Washington in the early 1990s by bands like Bikini Kill, Bratmobile, Team Dresch, and Sleater-Kinney, who would perform at shows attended by young people, many of whom attended the largely progressive Evergreen State College. The movement adapted many of the cultural cornerstones of the Punk movement like fanzines and DIY aesthetics to embody female rage directed at the patriarchal oppression and sexism that women faced in American society at large and within the largely male-dominated Punk scene. The movement coined the phrase and rallying cry "girls to the front," which was called out at live shows to move the men to the side of the venue and bring all of the women forward to the stage. While a short-lived local movement, with several of its most prominent bands like Bikini Kill and Bratmobile disbanding by the mid 1990s, the Riot grrrl movement was nonetheless influential on a global stage both to music and to culture, creating a blueprint for a method of expressing female rage via music.

=== Classical music and opera ===
Several Northwest cities have symphony orchestras, including the Oregon Symphony, Seattle Symphony, Spokane Symphony, and Vancouver Symphony Orchestra. The Northwest Chamber Orchestra is based in Seattle. Vancouver, Seattle, and Portland have operas. Smaller cities such as Victoria and Eugene have classical groups as well.

== Local music scenes ==
Northwest cities have spawned their own music scenes and styles, including music of Olympia, music of Portland, music of Seattle, and Northwest hiphop from Tacoma and elsewhere.

== Festivals ==
Among the area's largest music festivals are the Merritt Mountain Music Festival, the Vancouver Folk Music Festival, the Sasquatch! Music Festival in George, Washington, Seattle's Bumbershoot and Northwest Folklife, and Portland's MusicfestNW. Portland's Waterfront Blues Festival is the largest blues-based festival west of the Mississippi River.
