= Eyes Like Yours =

Eyes Like Yours may refer to:

- "Eyes Like Yours", the 2001 English-language version of the 1999 song "Ojos Así" by Shakira
- "Eyes Like Yours", a 1995 song by Some Velvet Sidewalk from Shipwreck
