= Music of Olympia, Washington =

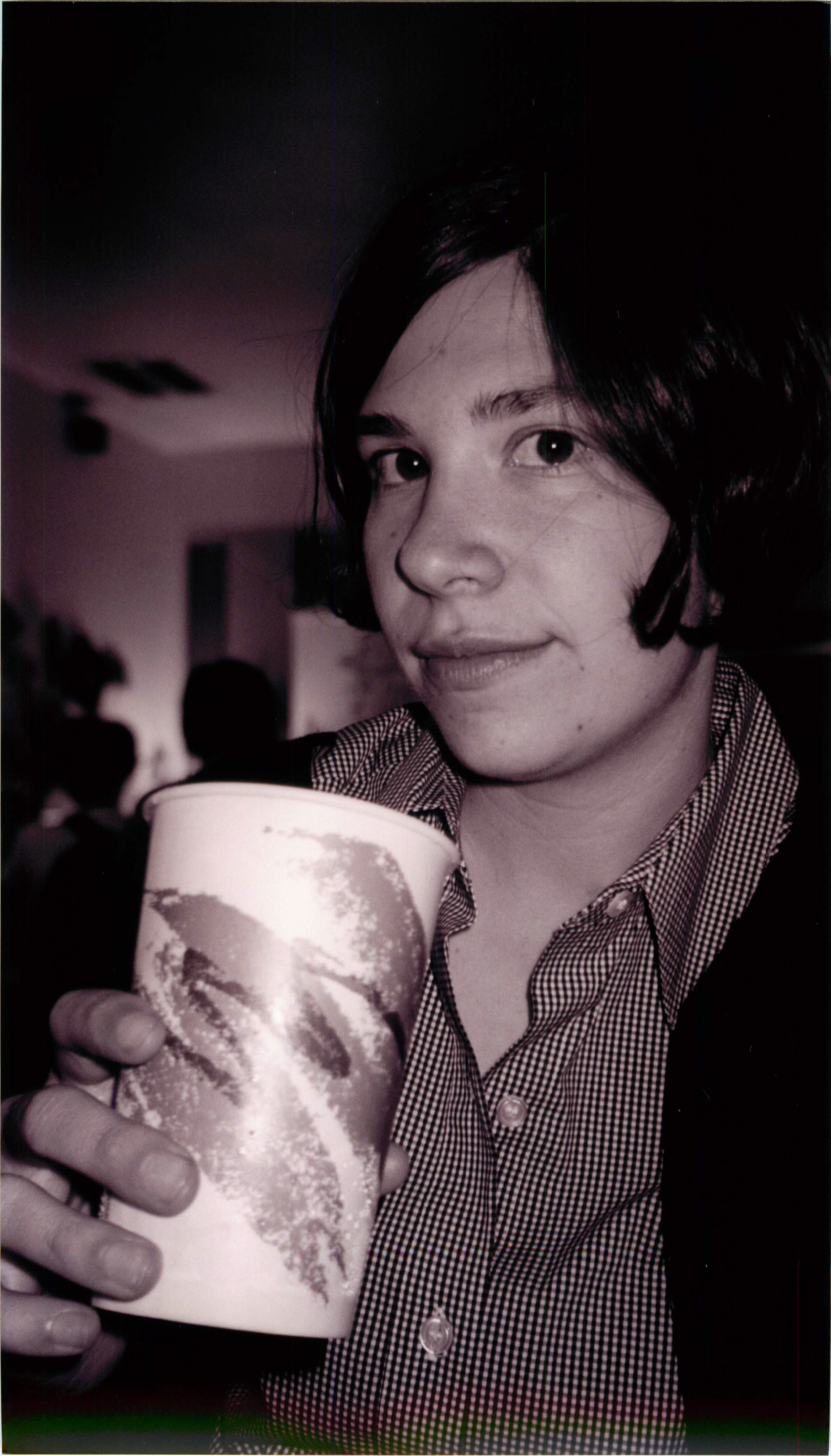
Carrie Brownstein of Sleater-Kinney in Olympia, between 1994 and 2001

The port city of Olympia, Washington, has been a center of post-hardcore, anti-folk, indie rock and other youth-oriented musical genres since the late 1970s. Before this period, Olympia's The Fleetwoods had several Billboard chart successes between 1959 and 1963. Olympia saw a rise in feminism in the music industry, where artists commonly addressed rape, domestic abuse, sexuality, racism, patriarchy, classism, anarchism, and female empowerment in their songs. It was a center for the riot grrrl movement of the early 1990s, which featured Bikini Kill and Bratmobile.

Olympia's downtown Capitol Theater hosted the punk and indie-rock International Pop Underground Convention in 1991 and the Yoyo-A-Go-Go festival in 1994, 1997, 1999 and 2001. The city has several record labels and companies, including K Records and Kill Rock Stars; Kill Rock Stars has signed Bikini Kill, Sleater-Kinney, Unwound and Elliott Smith.

== Notable musicians and groups ==
- Bangs, part of the riot grrrl movement, formed in 1997 and were active until 2010. Kill Rock Stars signed the band.
- Beat Happening, which formed in 1983, played lo-fi music.
- Bikini Kill, which formed in 1990 as pioneers of the riot grrrl movement, released several EPs and two albums.
- The Blow, founded in 2001, deliver Olympia-influenced monologues.
- Bratmobile played punk and early riot grrrl music from 1991 to 2003.
- Cool Rays, formed by Evergreen State College students, active 1980-1981.
- Lois Maffeo was most active during the early 1990s.
- Dub Narcotic Sound System, formed in 1995, was signed to K Records.
- Earth, 1989–1997, 2003–present.
- Excuse 17 recorded from 1993 to 1995.
- Fitz of Depression punk band formed in 1989, active until 2019. Released work on K and Kill Rock Stars.
- The Fleetwoods, a vocal pop group, recorded "Come Softly to Me" (their debut single and biggest hit) in 1959.
- The Frumpies, a lo-fi punk rock band, formed in 1992 and split in 2000.
- G.L.O.S.S. was a trans-feminist hardcore punk band which formed in 2014 and split in 2016.
- godheadSilo, a noise rock duo which first formed in 1991 and reformed in 2015, focusing on stoner rock and sludge metal.
- The Go Team was a duo which was active from 1985 to 1989.
- Gossip was active from 1999 to 2016, and participated in Olympia's 2000 Ladyfest.
- Heavens to Betsy was a punk duo which formed during the early 1990s.
- Lync was a post-hardcore band active from 1992 to 1994.
- Milk Music was a four-member band founded in 2008.
- The Microphones was a project fronted by Phil Elverum that lasted from 1996 to 2003.
- The Need, a queercore band formed in the mid-1990s, was signed to the Kill Rock Stars label and was active until 2001.
- The Old Haunts, formed in 2001, was also signed to the Kill Rock Stars label.
- Pigeon Pit, a folk punk band formed in 2014.
- Sleater-Kinney, originally part of the riot grrrl movement, have been active since 1994.
- Team Dresch, a queercore/punk band formed in 1993.
- Trans FX, a rock band formed in 2011.
- Wynne Greenwood performed electropop music as Tracy + the Plastics during the early 2000s via video projection.
- Unwound, a post-hardcore band, was active from 1991 to 2002. They have since reunited in 2022.

== Radio stations ==
- KAOS Olympia Community Radio 89.3 FM
- KXXO

== Record labels ==
- K Records (founded 1982)
- Kill Rock Stars (founded 1991)

== Music festivals and events ==
- Yoyo A Go Go (1994–2001)
- Ladyfest (2000)
- The International Pop Underground Convention (1991)
- Girls to the Front (1991).
