= Dead Air Fresheners =

American music group

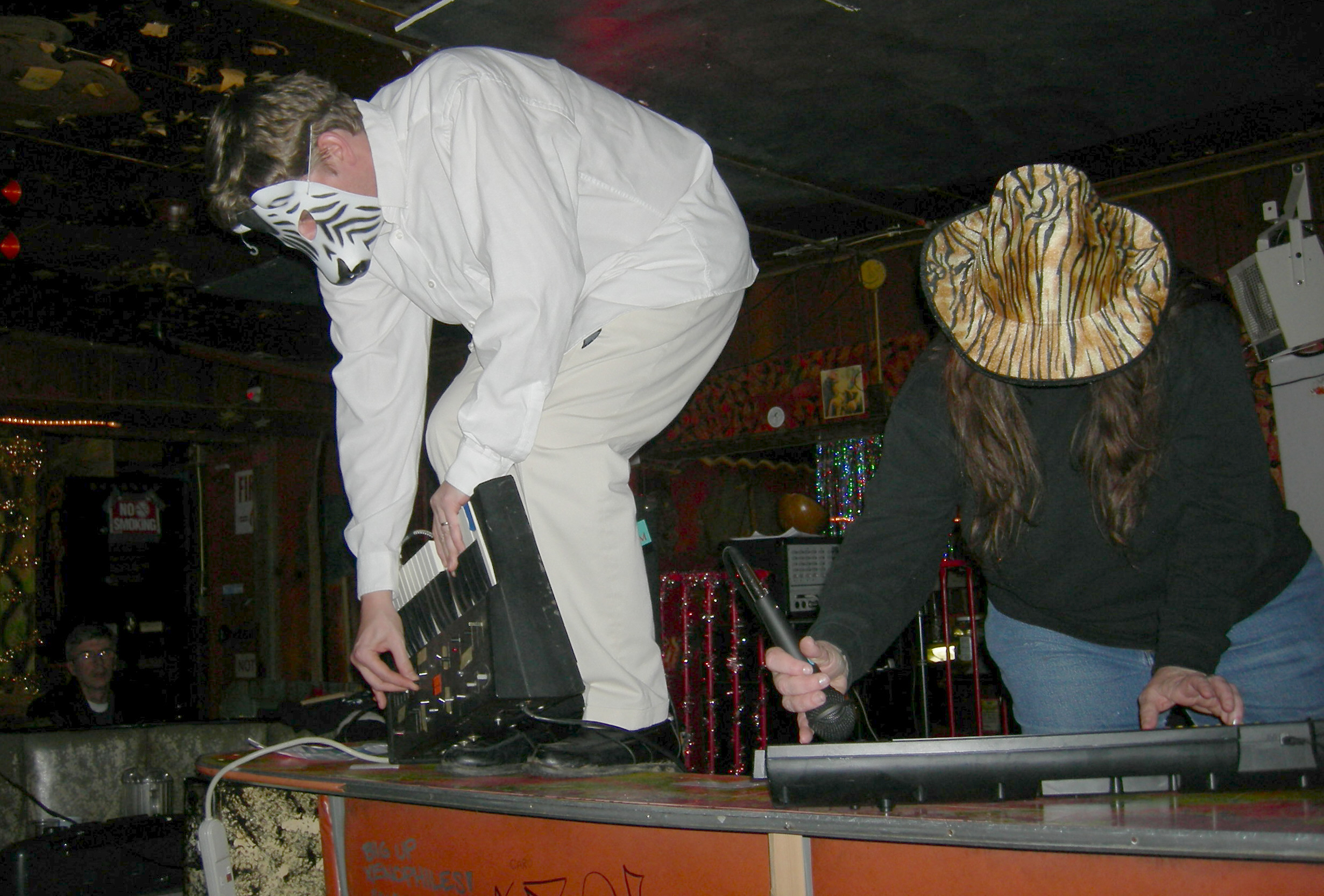
- Dead Air Fresheners, performing 12 January 2008 at Bob's Java Jive, Tacoma, Washington.

Background information
- Origin: Portland, Oregon, Olympia, Washington, Seattle, Washington USA
- Genres: Experimental rock, post-punk
- Years active: 1996–present

The Dead Air Fresheners are a Portland, Oregon-based experimental and post-punk musical group with a somewhat fluctuating membership. They have been described by Portland's KPSU as "A long-time mainstay of the Experimental Rock Scene." They count Sun Ra, John Cage, Sonic Youth, Sun City Girls, and Jandek as influences.

== Band history ==
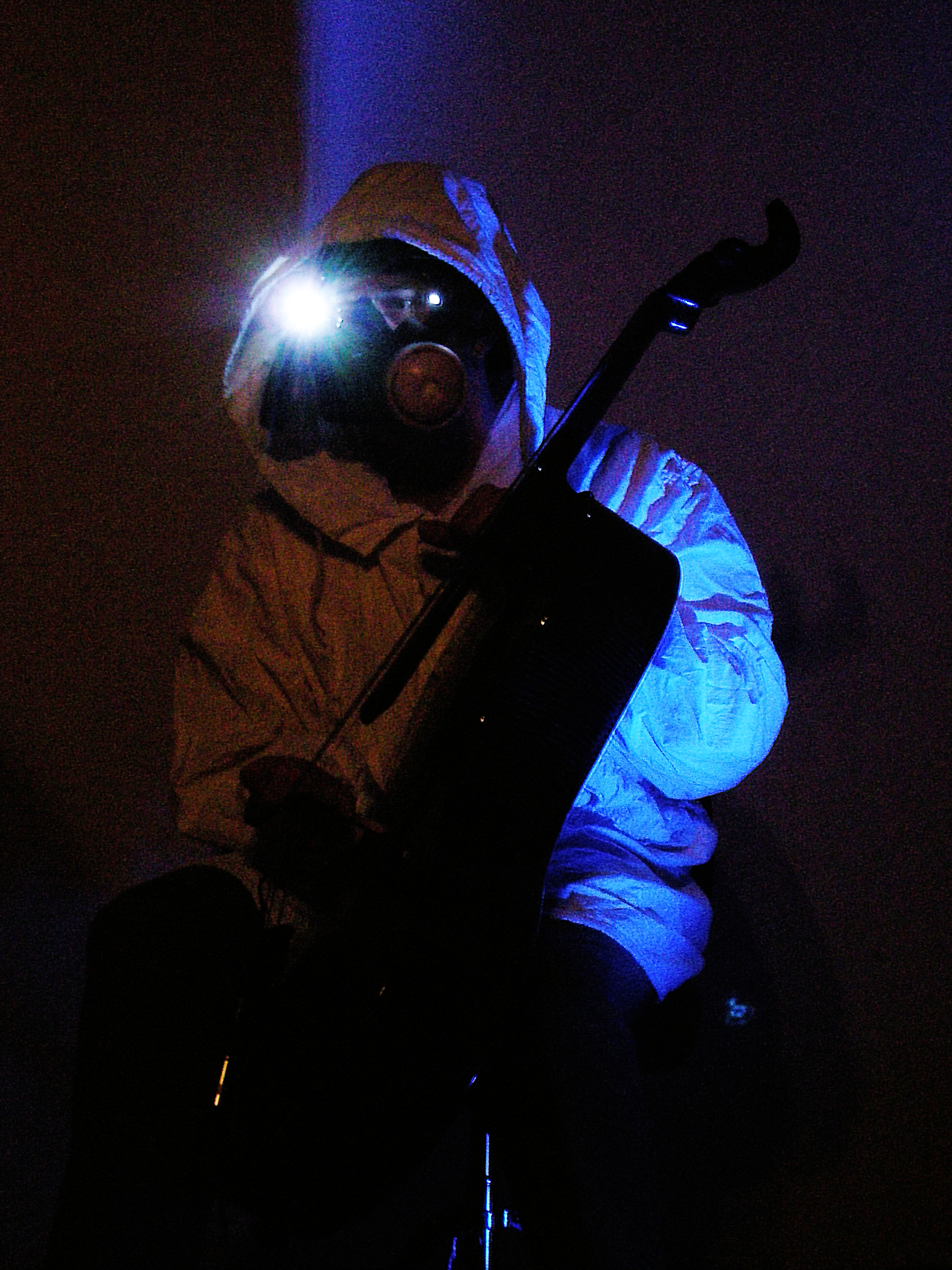
At the 14th Olympia Experimental Music Festival, 2008

The band formed around 1996. They claim to have first formed "in a dilapidated beachfront mansion on the Eld Inlet in Thurston County, Washington" (Eld Inlet is the site of The Evergreen State College); in any event, they first performed publicly in 1997 at Olympia, Washington's annual Olympia Experimental Music Festival.

Their instrumentation has been known to include Moog synthesizer, and tape samples, drums, ambient vocals, distorted feedback, electric guitar, computers and digital toys, and digeridoo. The Dead Air Fresheners state in interviews and on their My Space page that they do not play improvised music despite frequent perceptions to the contrary. Rather they use a process of Chance Music composition influenced by the work of John Cage (also called Indeterminate music) and their Myspace page provides several examples of scores from past performances.

They have done several live radio performances; portions of their hour-long session with poet Chuck Swaim on KEXP's "Sonarchy Radio" were included as songs in the self-released album Pleasure Is Where All Labor Ends and two performances on KPSU are on that station's archives.

=== Band members ===
The band has consisted of members based in Bellingham, Olympia, Seattle, Salem, and Portland. The three core members are located in St. Johns, Portland. Because of their penchant for anonymity, masks, and costumes, there is no definitive list of the group's membership. Nonetheless, several publications covering either the experimental music scene or entertainment in the Pacific Northwest have reported them to have included at various times members of such bands as Olympia's now defunct Karp, Austin, Texas' ...And You Will Know Us By the Trail of Dead, Bellingham, Washington's Noggin, and Portland, Oregon's Nice Nice. In Signum magazine, writer Tiffany Lee Brown implies strongly that Olympia Experimental Music Festival founder Jim McAdams is one of the anonymous musicians in the group. Matt Driscoll of the Weekly Volcano (South Puget Sound) states this outright. Emily Pothast in The Wire states that Ricardo Wang, host of the "What's this Called?" program on Freeform Portland Radio is a member. This was confirmed in a 2023 St. Johns Review article. Wang's two sons are also considered regular members.

McAdams's wife, Deanne Rowley McAdams, died 3 August 2011. Her obituary in The Olympian indicates that she was a member of the group, and that she had also played with Texas and Pacific Northwest bands Plain Jane, [...And You Will Know Us By the] Trail of Dead, Pro-Ex Marauders, and Cherry 2000, and that she had a band of her own called Leopards.

== Discography ==
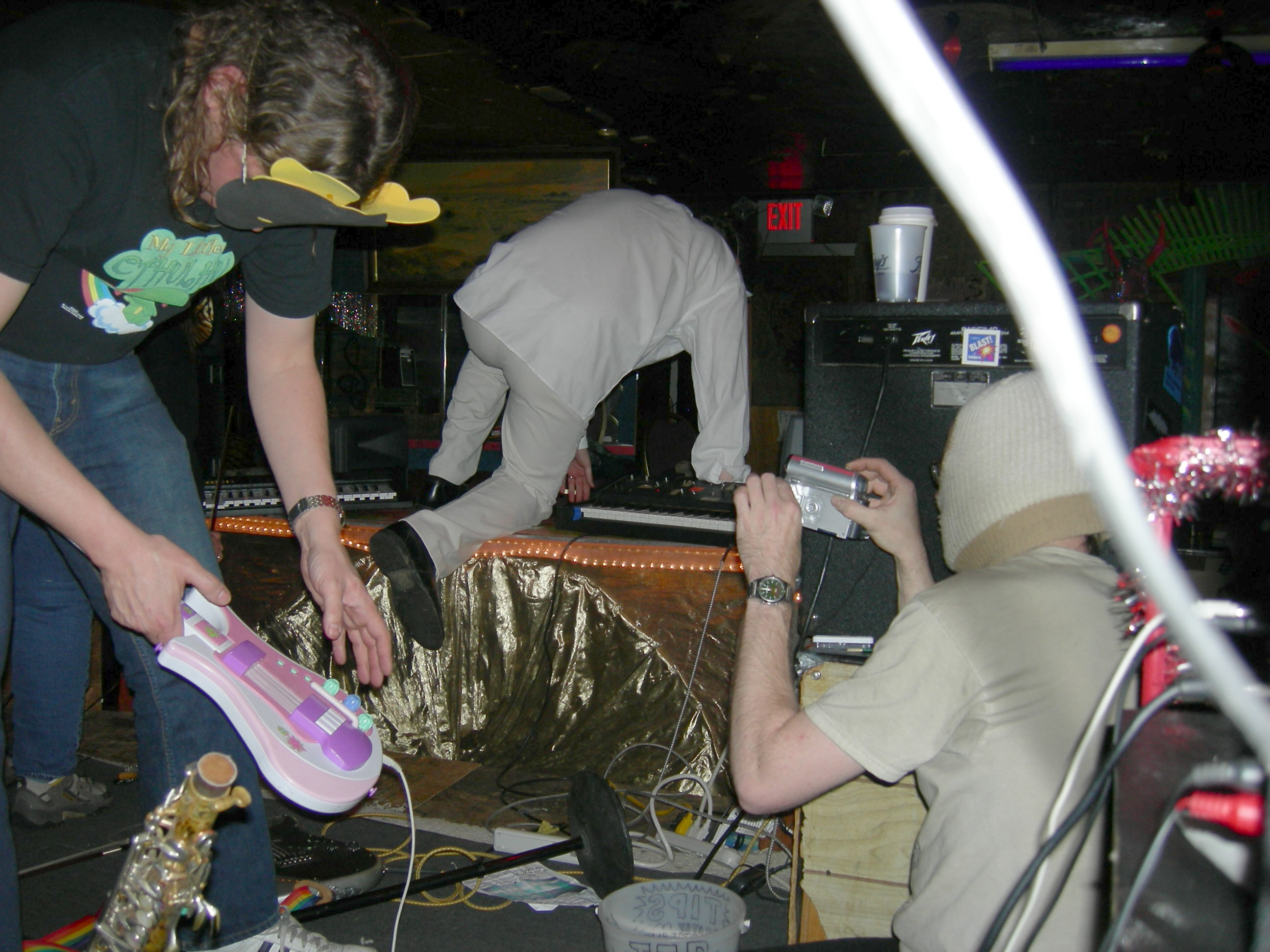
Another image from the January 2008 show.

- I Try To Show My Love, Plastic Duck Records, 1999
- Verses of Echo, Bastard Customer, and Pleasure Is Where All Labor Ends, with poet Chuck Swaim, (self-released) 2001–2003
- An Ulcer is a String of Pearls, 2006, Kill Pop Tarts (CDR-ep)
- a Slip Inside the Quiet Room, 2007, Icky Recordings
- Separated by Commas, 2010, Dubuque Strange Music Society (collaborations with various other artists; CDR)
- Extension Cord Symphony 9, (Postmoderncore, 2016)
- Fast Radio Bursts, Personal Archives (Dubuque, Iowa, 8 August 2016)
- Evidence of Superstructures II (Postmoderncore, 2017)
- Brother Calls (Postmoderncore, 2019)
- Come On Get Happy (Kill Pop Tarts, 2021)
- Here’s to Letting Go, Bob Bucko Jr. with the Dead Air Fresheners (Kill Pop Tarts, 2021)
- A Collection of Drone & Noise Sea Shanties (Personal Archives, 2021)
- The Last Asteroid (Kill Pop Tarts, 2022)
- tape hiss is the blow job of lo-fi (Kill Pop Tarts, 2022)
- Noise + Air = Noir, Noisepoet Nobody & Dead Air Fresheners (Kill Pop Tarts 2022)
- Unfriended (Personal Archives 2022)
- Tales from the Elusive Hangar (Kill Pop Tarts 2023)
- Forbidden Secrets of the Elusive Hangar (Kill Pop Tarts 2024)
- Moon, with Jennifer Robin (Green Monkey Records, 2025)
- The Process of Elimination Will Find You In the End (Kill Pop Tarts 2025)
- Astral Wildlife, (split release with Four Dimensional Nightmare, Kill Pop Tarts 2025)

Also included in compilations:

- Infamous Polywogs Vol. 1?, Inlet Recordings, 2002
- Infamous Polywogs Vol. 2?, Kill Pop Tarts, 2004
- Reek of Influence, Icky Recordings, 2006
- "Five Minutes in Dog Years" track on compilation Winter Copulation 2016 (SDM-032), SadoDaMascus Records (Portland, Oregon, 2016)

Source for discography (except as noted):
