= Old Time Relijun =

American experimental rock band

- Genres: Noise rock; experimental rock; indie rock; no wave; art punk; punk blues; post-punk; lo-fi
- Years active: 1995– present
- Labels: K Records; Pine Cone Alley
- Members: Germaine Baca; Aaron Hartman; Arrington de Dionyso; Ben Hartman
- Past members: Phil Elverum; Bryce Panic; Fezdak Clamchopbreath; Aaron Shallenberger; Jamie Peterson

Old Time Relijun is a band founded in Olympia, Washington, United States and a longtime member of K Records. Current members consist of Germaine Baca on drums, Aaron Hartman on upright bass, Ben Hartman on saxophones, and Arrington de Dionyso on electric guitar, vocals and bass clarinet. The reviews of the band are radically mixed among critics. Pitchfork Media gave a very critical review of their Uterus and fire album, while another praised the band for their "brilliance". The band first began recording under a home-made audio cassette label, Pine Cone Alley, and were later adopted by indie label K Records. Old Time Relijun are currently based in Portland, Oregon.

== Discography ==
- 1997
  - Songbook Vol. I (Pine Cone Alley) CD - out of print
  - "Casino" on Overboard compilation (YOYO)
  - "Siren" on Selector Dub Narcotic compilation (K)
    - (the above were recorded with Bryce Panic on drums)
- 1998
  - "Qiyamat" on KAOS Theory compilation (Cottleston Pie/Mayonnaise)
  - "Jail" b/w "Office Building" 7"
- 1999
  - Uterus and Fire CD/LP (K)
  - "Giant Boat" video on the Blackeye Video compilation
- 2000
  - La Sirena de Pecera CD/LP (K)
  - "Sabertooth Tyger-Distorted Version" on the Hootnholler compilation
- 2001
  - Witchcraft Rebellion CD/LP (K)
  - "King of Nothing" b/w "drum n bass" 7" (tour-only by Wallace Records)
- 2003
  - Varieties of Religious Experience CD (K)
  - Neon Meate Dream of an Octafish: A Tribute to Captain Beefheart & His Magic Band (track "Wild Life")
- 2004
  - Lost Light CD/LP (K)
- 2005
  - 2012 CD (K)
- 2007
  - Catharsis in Crisis CD/LP
- 2019
  - See Now and Know CD/LP (K)
- 2021
  - Musicking CD/LP/Digital Download (K)
