= How to Be a Cat =

Children's picture book by Nikki McClure

- Author: Nikki McClure
- Illustrator: Nikki McClure
- Language: English
- Genre: Children's picture book
- Published: 2013 (Abrams Books for Young Readers)
- Publication place: USA
- Media type: Print (hardback)
- Pages: 30 (unpaginated)
- ISBN: 9781419705281
- OCLC: 865018317

How to Be a Cat is a 2013 children's picture book by Nikki McClure. It is about a kitten learning kitty skills from a cat.

== Reception ==
The School Library Journal, in its review of How to Be a Cat, wrote "Boldly rendered black-and-white images offer the perfect background for the large, pale blue font of the text, which consists solely of verbs, and the butterfly that flits its way through the pages with the kitten in pursuit.". Booklist found it "Spare, with the feel of an art book, this gracefully illustrates the parent-child relationship."

How to Be a Cat has also been reviewed by Kirkus Reviews, Publishers Weekly, Horn Book Guides, The Deakin Review of Children's Literature, The Bulletin of the Center for Children's Books, and the Washington Missourian.
