= Sitting on Snaps =

Studio album by Mecca Normal
- Released: 1995
- Label: Matador

Mecca Normal chronology
| Flood Plain (1993) | Sitting on Snaps (1995) | The Eagle and the Poodle (1996) |

Sitting on Snaps is an album by the Canadian musical duo Mecca Normal, released in 1995. The duo supported the album with a North American tour.

== Production ==
Calvin Johnson produced a few of the album's tracks. Peter Jefferies played piano on "Cyclone" and "Vacant Night Sky", part of an effort to broaden the duo's sound beyond just Jean Smith's voice and David Lester's guitar. Jefferies would form Two-Foot Flame with Smith around the time of the album; he produced and played drums on Mecca Normal's next record, The Eagle and the Poodle.

== Critical reception ==
Professional ratings
Review scores
| Source | Rating |
|---|---|
| AllMusic | 3/5 stars |
| Chicago Tribune | 2/4 stars |
| Robert Christgau | (dud) |
| Rolling Stone | 4/5 stars |

Rolling Stone wrote: "Mecca Normal's approach is spare and self-contained, but long gone is the amateur primitivism of their folkish start; one might call this free punk, as avant and accomplished as its jazz counterpart." The Los Angeles Times called the band "an intriguing, consistently challenging force," writing that Smith's "hissing, melodramatic vocals, somewhere between Grace Slick, Patti Smith and a dental drill, slither and flail next to eerie guitar work, while [her] abstract lyrics provoke strong and disquieting images." LA Weekly noted the "jolting sonic experiments with the ante upped by occasional melodic acoustic solos."

The Santa Fe New Mexican thought that "the sound is amazingly full ... Smith's voice goes with the greatest of ease from slightly edgy to tortured animal." The Record opined that Smith and Lester "conjure some nice mood pieces in 'Trapped Inside Your Heart', 'Cyclone', and 'Vacant Night Sky'." SF Weekly wrote that "Smith's lyrics move from the overtly political to the elliptical; accordingly, her droning vocals occupy prettier soundscapes."

Option deemed the album "highly unlistenable." AllMusic wrote that Smith's vocals "are perhaps the strongest and most noticeable part of the combination this time around—she stretches her syllables out quite often, creating unsettled, overdubbed drones of sorts."

== Track listing ==
| No. | Title | Length |
|---|---|---|
| 1. | "Vacant Night Sky" |
| 2. | "Something to be Said" |
| 3. | "Crimson Dragnet" |
| 4. | "Frozen Rain" |
| 5. | "Only Heat" |
| 6. | "Trapped Inside Your Heart" |
| 7. | "Alibi" |
| 8. | "Pamela Makes Waves" |
| 9. | "Beppo's Room" |
| 10. | "Cyclone" |
| 11. | "Gravity Believes" |

== Personnel ==
- David Lester – guitar
- Jean Smith – vocals
