= Nikki McClure =

American writer

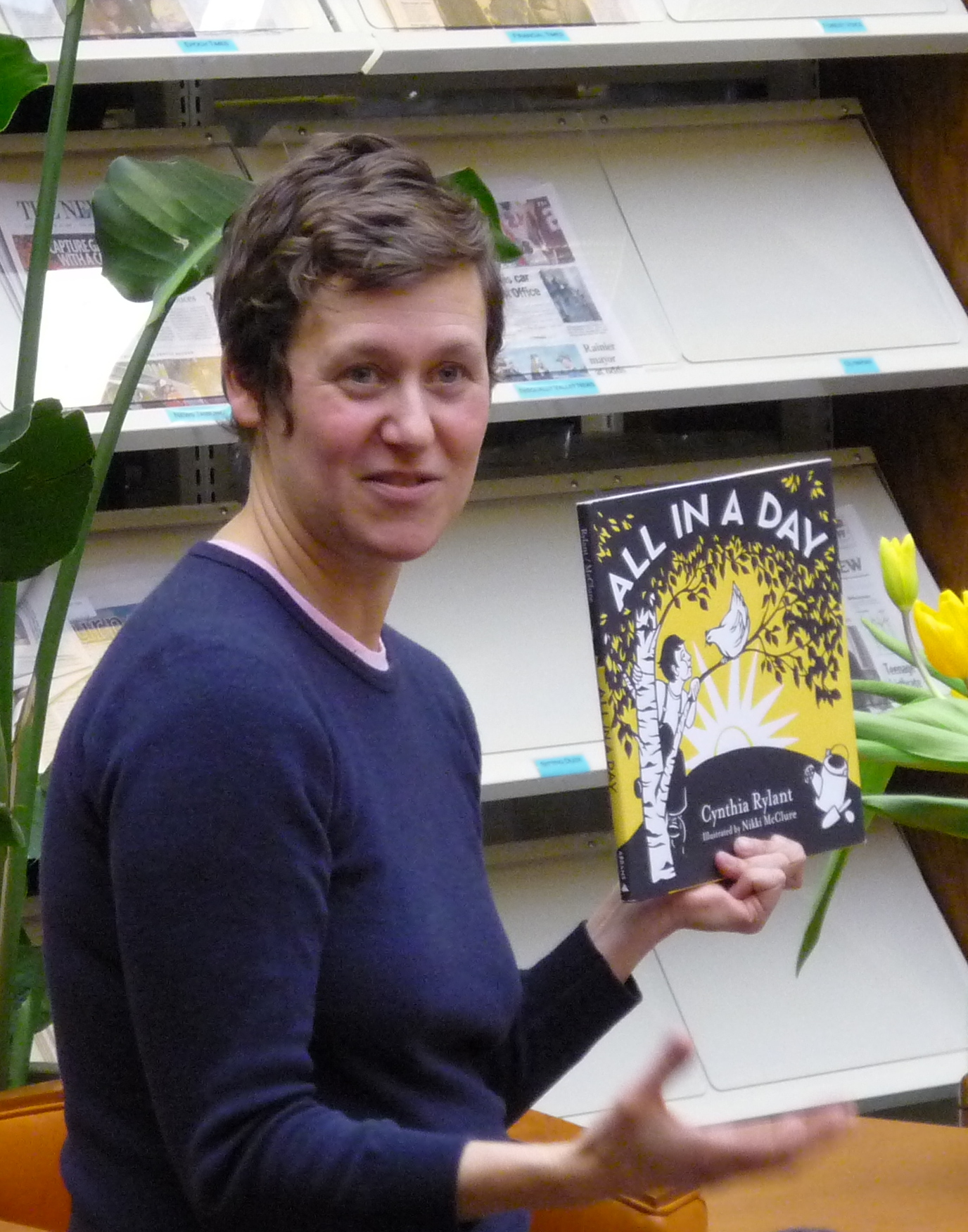
- McClure at Olympia Timberland Library, 2009
- Known for: Papercutting
- Movement: Riot grrrl
- Partner: Jay T. Scott
- Children: 1
- Website: nikkimcclure.com

Nikki McClure is a papercut artist based in Olympia, Washington. She is the author and illustrator of a number of children's books and produces an annual calendar.

== Biography ==
McClure grew up in Kirkland, Washington. She moved to Olympia in 1986 to attend The Evergreen State College where she studied natural history and received B.S. and B.A. degrees in 1991. She would take walks in the forest, making up songs and singing them loudly; sometimes performing them at house shows. She sang onstage during the August 1991 International Pop Underground Convention in Olympia, and one of her songs was included on the vinyl edition of the Convention's live album.

McClure rented a studio near K Records and experimented with linocuts. Following her graduation, she took a job at the Washington Department of Ecology. There she created her first children's book, Wetlands. The 1992 publication by the Washington State Department of Ecology remained in print until 2015, and (as of 2017) remains available in PDF form.

McClure creates papercuts using an X-Acto knife in a style partially inspired by Works Progress Administration posters. Her early work involved creating t-shirts and album artwork for friends and Olympia bands such as Sleater-Kinney. She worked with the indie record labels Kill Rock Stars and K Records and was associated with the riot grrrl movement.

Beginning in 1998, McClure began producing an annual calendar. She has authored and illustrated a number of children's books. McClure allows non-profits to use her work with permission and has created works for Patagonia, Olykraut, and Slow Food Nation. She also created a manhole cover design for Olympia's stormwater.

Her work has been showcased in an exhibition called Nikki McClure: Cutting Her Own Path, 1996–2011 at the Museum of Contemporary Craft and the Bellevue Arts Museum. Her children's book about farmers' markets, To Market, To Market, won the 2012 Scandiuzzi Children's Book Award.

== Personal life ==
McClure has a son and lives in Olympia, Washington with her partner Jay T. Scott.

At the request of Kurt Cobain, McClure danced onstage at Nirvana's 1991 Live at the Paramount concert.

== Works ==
- Wetlands (1991)
- Apple (1996)
- How to Cook a Perfect Day (1997)
- Sent Out on the Tracks They Built, written by Sarah Dougher, (1998)
- Solitude (1998)
- The Great Chicken Escape (1998)
- Ten First Graders, monotype, (2000)
- Conmigo (2001)
- C2C (2001)
- This Yearning (2002)
- Welcome (2004)
- In Between (2004)
- The First 1000 Days (2006, Sasquatch)
- Awake to Nap (2006, Sasquatch)
- Collect Raindrops (2007, Abrams)
- Things to Make and Do (2008, Sasquatch)
- All in a Day written by Cynthia Rylant, (2009, Abrams)
- Mama, Is It Summer Yet? (2010, Abrams)
- To Market, To Market (2011)
- How To Be A Cat (2013)
- Old Wooden Boat (2022)
