= The Crabs =

- Origin: Portland, Oregon, USA
- Genres: Indie Pop, Indie Rock
- Years active: 1993–1999
- Labels: Knw-Yr-Own; K Records

The Crabs were a Portland, Oregon-based indie-rock band. Originally formed as a duo with Jonn Lunsford (vocals, guitar) and Lisa Jackson (vocals, drums), the pair later added keyboardist Sarah Dougher following their 1997 release What Were Flames Now Smolder.

== Members ==
- Jonn Lunsford – Vocals and guitar
- Lisa Jackson – Vocals and drums
- Sarah Dougher – Organ (on Sand and Sea)

== Discography ==
- Albums

Year	Title	Label
1995	Jackpot	K Records
1996	Brainwashed	K Records
1997	What Were Flames Now Smolder	K Records
1999	Sand and Sea	K Records

- 7"s

Year	Title	Label
1993	Dreamboat	Knw-Yr-Own
1994	Sore	Knw-Yr-Own

- Singles

Year	Title	Label
1994	Alien Girl	Soda Girl
