= Jean Smith (singer) =

Canadian musician, writer and artist

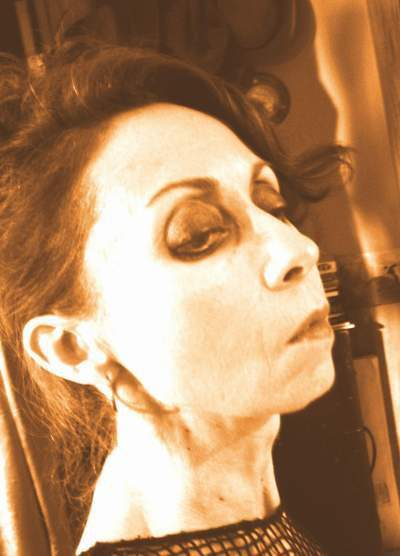

Background information
- Born: Jean Isabel Smith; 1959 (age 66–67); Vancouver, British Columbia, Canada
- Occupations: Singer, painter, novelist, lecturer
- Member of: Mecca Normal

Jean Isabel Smith (born 1959) is a Canadian writer, painter and the lead singer of the Vancouver band Mecca Normal.

== Career ==
=== Music ===
Smith co-founded Mecca Normal with bandmate David Lester in 1981, while the two were working together at a Vancouver newspaper. Considered a forerunner of the 1990s politically charged riot grrrl movement, Mecca Normal is known for the interplay between Smith's vocals and Lester’s guitar, which is equally distinctive and powerful.

=== Writing ===
As a writer of creative fiction, Smith has two published novels. She is a two-time recipient of Canada Council for the Arts awards for creative fiction (2000, 2007) and received a British Columbia Arts Council grant in 2000.

Her debut novel, I Can Hear Me Fine, was published in 1993 by Get To The Point Editions and distributed by Arsenal Pulp Press. This was followed by The Ghost of Understanding (Arsenal Pulp Press, 1998), which incorporates lyrics from several Mecca Normal albums.

=== Painting ===
In 2016, Smith launched a significant, ongoing contemporary portrait series aimed at making her paintings financially available to low-income musicians, writers, and artists, while setting aside funds after meeting monthly living expenses to create a free artist residency. Painting daily, she sells the 11x14" acrylic works on Facebook for US$100, a model that has generated widespread coverage for its accessible DIY approach.
