= Olympia Experimental Music Festival =

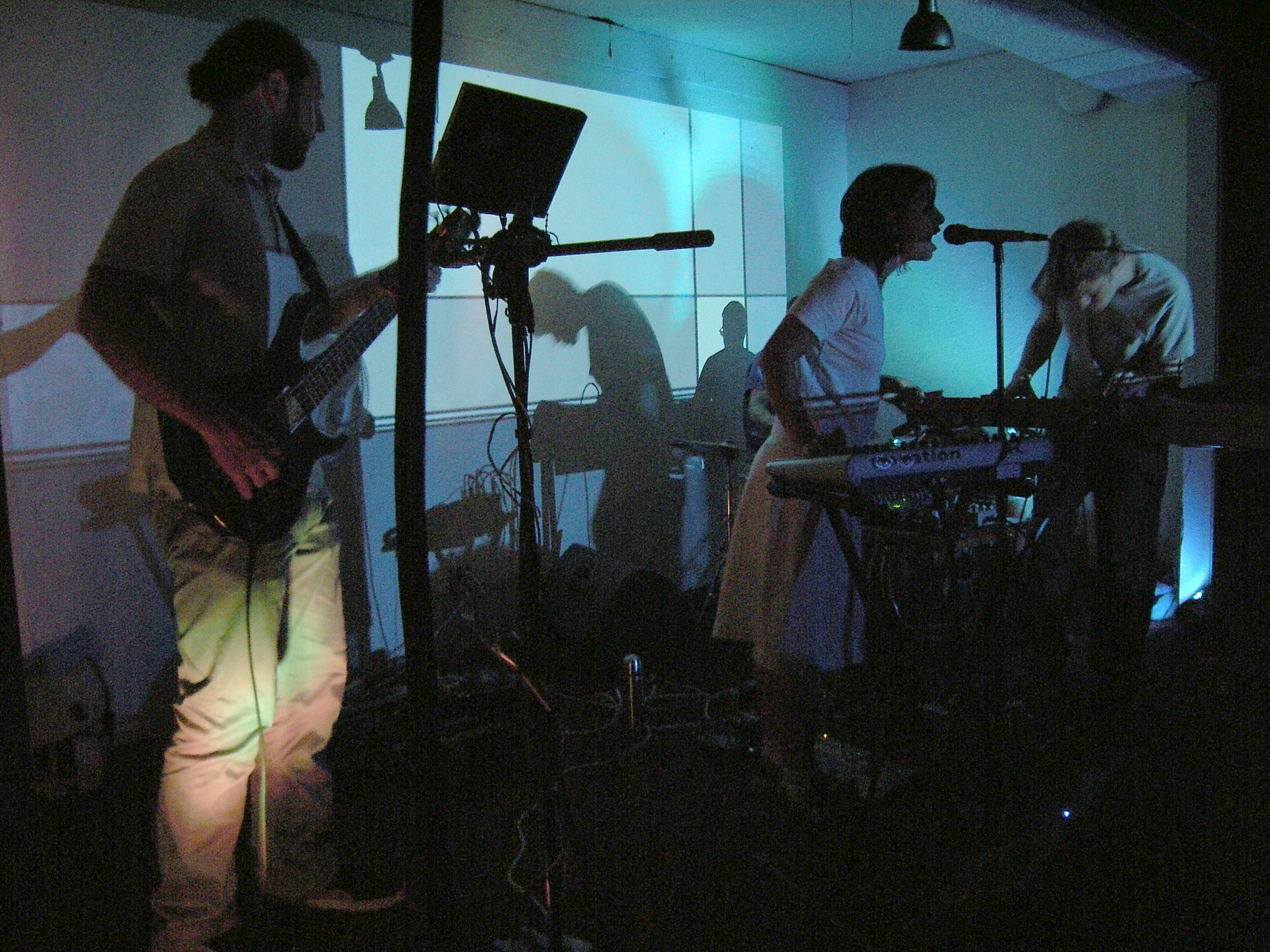
- Portland, Oregon band Dendrites perform at the 14th Olympia Experimental Music Festival, 2008.
- Genre: Electronic music, experimental music
- Location: Olympia, Washington
- Years active: 1995-present
- Founders: L. Jim McAdams
- Website: Olympia Strange Music MySpace page

The Olympia Experimental Music Festival, also known for a time as The Olympia Festival of Experimental Musics, has been produced annually in Olympia, Washington since 1995. Organizers have included festival founder L. Jim McAdams, Arrington de Dionyso (founder of the Olympia Strange Music Society), Aerick Duckhugger, and Domenica Clark. During de Dionyso's tenure as chief organizer (festivals 9–12) the festival was primarily known by the alternate name The Olympia Festival of Experimental Musics.

== History ==
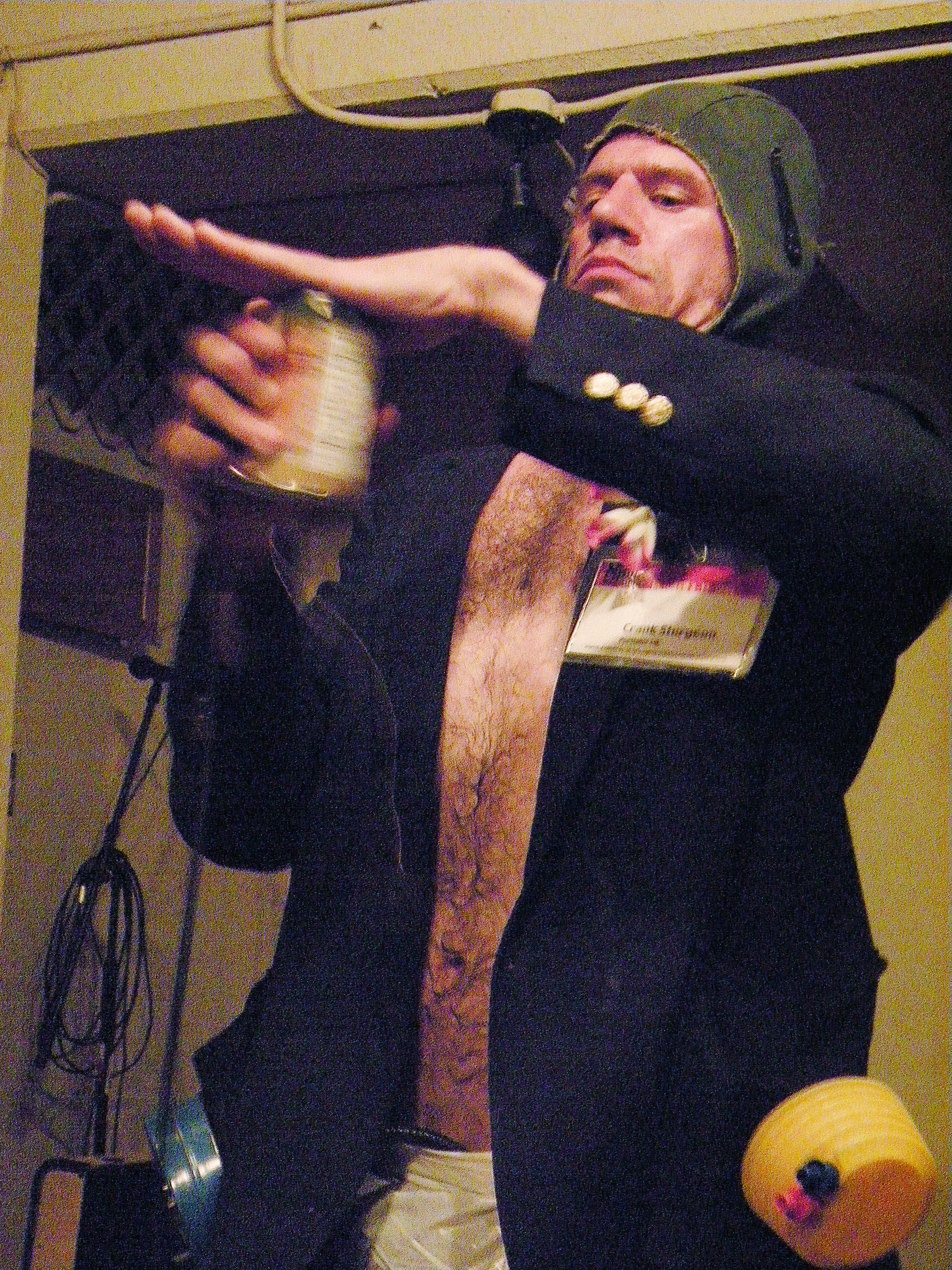
Portland, Maine performance artist Crank Sturgeon performs at the 14th Olympia Experimental Music Festival, 2008.

Performers have included Acre, Alps of New South Wales, A Nat Hema, Wendy Atkinson, Atropy Minor, Argumentix, Better People, Blue Sabbath Black Cheer, Bran Flakes, Cabinet of Natural Curiosities, Celesteville, Crank Sturgeon, Dead Air Fresheners, Amy Denio, Dendrites, Arrington de Dionyso, Paul Dutton, Evolution Control Committee, Steve Fisk, Foque Mopus, Gang Wizard, Hans Grusel's Krankenkabinet, Bill Horist, KnotPineBox, Al Larsen, Le Ton Mite, METAL, Midmight, Nequaquam Vacuum, Noggin, Noisettes, Office Products, Oliver Squash, Plants, Gino Robair, Sluggo, Chuck Swaim, Toro sec Toro, Jennifer Robin, White Rainbow, Bert Wilson, Wood Paneling, Paintings for Animals, LA Lungs, Four Dimensional Nightmare, Super Unity, Eurostache, and Nathan Cearley (at the time performing as Godzilla).

In addition to unusual, experimental, and/or noise music, many festival performers use film, multimedia, and spoken word. Yahoo News in 2007 called it a "summer festival to watch". In Signum, writer Tiffany Lee Brown commented in 2001: "This was no overpriced, fancypants event full of goatee-stroking theorizers or a showcase of overserious minimalist compositions, but a romp through the tangled underbrush of homegrown experimentalism."

== See also ==
- List of electronic music festivals
- List of experimental music festivals
