= Arrington de Dionyso =

American musician (born 1974/1975)

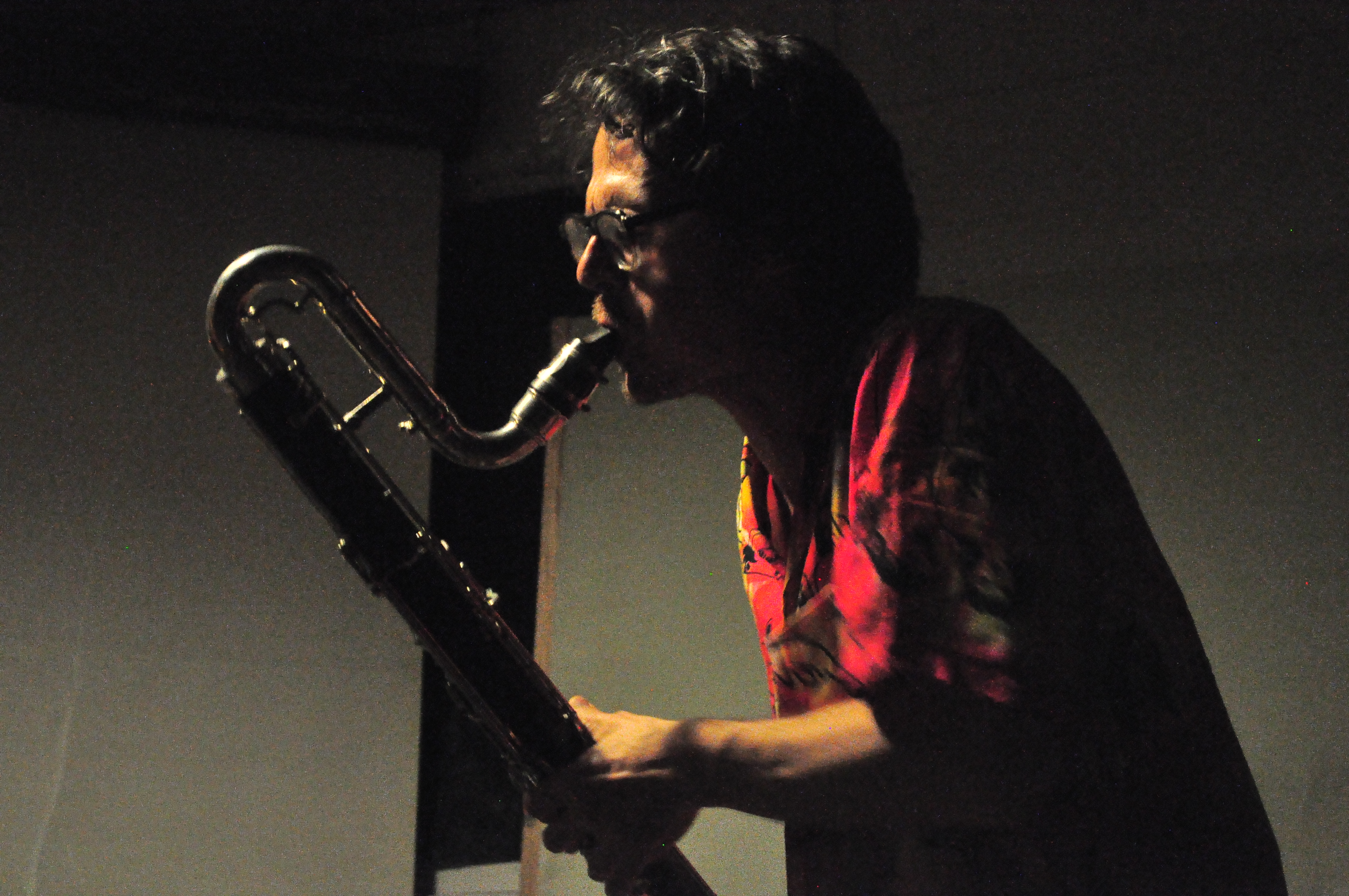
- Occupation: Musician
- Known for: Old Time Relijun, Malaikat dan Singa, Olympia Experimental Music Festival

Arrington de Dionyso (b. 1974 or 1975 (age 51–52)) is an Olympia, Washington-based artist and experimental musician. He was a member of Old Time Relijun since the 1990s. During Old Time Relijun's hiatus, he formed a new band based on Indonesian music called Malaikat dan Singa. De Dionyso directed Reak: Trance Music and Possession in West Java, a documentary film about the music of an Indonesian trance ceremony; the film was shown by the Olympia Film Society in May, 2016.

He is also a co-founder of the Olympia Experimental Music Festival.

Designer Hedi Slimane incorporated de Dionyso's drawing "Dragons and Angels in Deep Conversation" in various fashions as part of the Yves Saint Laurent 2015 collection.
