= Candice Pedersen =

American businesswoman

Candice Pedersen was a co-owner of K Records, an independent record label based in Olympia, Washington from 1986 to 1999, along with Calvin Johnson of Beat Happening. In 1999, she sold her half of the label to Johnson.

== Career ==
Pedersen was initially hired as a K Records intern in January 1986, for $20 a week and credits at Evergreen State College in Olympia. She became a full partner in 1989 until selling her share of the company to Johnson in 1999. Though she managed day-to-day operations of the label, she noted in a 1992 interview that "I'm often considered my partner's secretary."

Pedersen also contributed to the label's history through organizing the citywide International Pop Underground Convention, which was an extension of a summer barbecue party she had hosted on Steamboat Island, near Olympia. Pedersen decided to make the event citywide in 1991, and was responsible for the all-girls night which is cited as a formative moment within the Pacific Northwest's riot grrrl scene, marking the debut performance of many acts which became nationally renowned.
