= Trans FX =

American rock band

- Also known as: Transfix • TFX
- Origin: Olympia, Washington, U.S.
- Genres: Rock, punk
- Years active: 2011–present
- Label: Joker's Got A Posse • Perennial • K Records • Sister Cylinder
- Members: C. McDonnell; Mirçe Popovic; Abby Dahlquist; Alex Coxen
- Past members: S. Young; Felisha Perez; Chris Johnson; D.A. Terrence; Hayes Waring; Nora McKinnon; Steve Sharrett; Lexxi Lovell; Captain Tripps Ballsington (Producer)

Trans FX is an American rock band formed in 2011 by songwriters Chris McDonnell and Scott Young in Olympia, Washington. As of 2024, they have released seven albums and continue to operate as a collaborative band based in Olympia. Their sound has been compared to that of Lou Reed, Happy Mondays, Brian Eno, Primal Scream, and The Jesus and Mary Chain.

== History ==
Initially called Transfix, the band was formed in McDonnell's home studio. Initially described as a deathrock band, its initial lineup included Scott Young (keyboards, vocals), Chris McDonnell (guitar, vocals), Nora McKinnon (drums), and Steve Sharrett (bass). The band recorded a full-length album with Olympia-based Dutch Tilt Records, released December 16, 2013. Their second studio album, Into The Blu, was released on K Records in fall 2015. This album marked a shift towards electronic pop, and the band shortened their name to Trans FX. Young left the band in 2015 to pursue art. In 2017, the band collaborated with Olympia-based CC Dust on the CCFX EP, released on DFA Records.

== Discography ==
=== Full albums ===
- Transfix S/T (2013, Dutch Tilt)
- Into The Blu (2015, Perennial/K Records)
- The Clearing (2016, Sister Cylinder)
- Gaslit (2017, Joker's Got A Posse)
- Stay Doggy, Stay (2017)
- The Showroom Dummies (2018, JGAP)
- music, drugs, technology & popular desire (2021, Joker's Got A Posse)
- Biggest Baddest Beatest (2023, Cercle Social)

=== EPs and singles ===
- Like A Glove/New Fix 7 (2013, Unwound Records)
- Death is so Relaxing... EP (2014, Ascetic House)
- When You See The Light Cass. Single (2014, Perennial)
- KAG//TFX- Fugue 7 (2015, Perennial)
- Hard Pill To Swallow EP (2017, Joker's Got A Posse)

=== Collaborations ===
- CCFX EP (2017, DFA Records)
