= Some Velvet Sidewalk =

American experimental rock band

Background information
- Origin: Eugene, Oregon, US
- Genres: Lo-fi, grunge, noise rock, noise pop, indie rock, punk rock
- Years active: 1987–1997, 2025-present
- Labels: K, Perennial
- Members: Al Larsen; Don Blair
- Past members: Robert Christie; Tobi Vail; Louise Olsen; Don Blair; Martin Bernier; Paul Schuster
- Website: https://www.propertyistheft.com/svs/

Some Velvet Sidewalk is an experimental lo-fi rock band from Olympia, Washington on the independent label K Records.

== History ==
Some Velvet Sidewalk was formed in Eugene, Oregon, in 1987 by Al Larsen (vocals, guitar) and Robert Christie (drums). Their first release was From Playground 'Til Now, and was self-released on cassette in 1988. Somewhere around this time, Jenny Olay joined on second guitar and went on the band's first American jaunt with the Go Team, Rich Jensen, Spook & The Zombies, and Mecca Normal. In 1990, Larsen along with Tobi Vail (drums) and Louise Olsen (bass) recorded the album, Shipwreck. Vail had previously played in Go Team and would go on to form Bikini Kill later that same year. Olsen had previously played in the Australian band Matrimony and would go on to form Viva Knievel with Kathleen Hanna later in 1990. The release of this album was heavily delayed, but it was eventually released in 1995.

Bill Karren (later of Bikini Kill) was an early associate of the band and contributed guitar on the live version of "Snow." on Appetite For Extinction. Mike Johnson (later of Dinosaur Jr.) played drums on "alright" on Appetite For Extinction. Donna Dresch (later of Team Dresch) appears on two songs on the Shipwreck album.

Just before the 1990 release of their first full album, Appetite For Extinction, Robert Christie left the band and was replaced by Don Blair and bass player Martin Bernier, whom Larsen had found in a free musician's wanted ad.

A short tour of small Pacific Northwest towns quickly followed with D.C. band Scream, of which Dave Grohl was a member and it was Some Velvet Sidewalk that accompanied Scream when Kurt Cobain first met Grohl at a small party at Slim Moon's home.

This new lineup soon recorded with Calvin Johnson in Yo Yo Studios along with Pat Maley what would become known as the "Pumpkin Patch" single.

They went back to the studio in 1991 with producer and musician Steve Fisk to record Avalanche, which released in 1992. They spent 1992 and 1993 touring and released a short EP called I Scream. The next album, Whirlpool, showed up in 1994. Ryan Baldoz of Olympia joined on second guitar around this time.

SVS soon added keyboardist Paul Schuster to the lineup to record the 1997 album Generate!. The last SVS release from their original formation, the EP The Lowdown, was released in late 1997.

The band was a member of the small yet influental "love-rock" scene around the northwest US around bands like Beat Happening and Kicking Giant.

The band broke up following an American tour, and the members went their separate ways. In 1999, Larsen compiled and released a posthumous SVS album called Original Love Rock Masters. This album is a compilation that contains live songs, garage demos, and various side projects.

=== After break-up ===
Al Larsen continued his musical career with bands such as the Polar Bears, the Evil Tambourines and Melting Igloo. In 2005, he released a solo album titled The Hardline According to Danny & the Dinosaur on his own label, Property Is Theft. Larsen later became an assistant professor and Coordinator of Creative Media at Champlain College and made conceptual artwork rather than music.

Martin Bernier joined Seattle's the Heroic Trio, which featured Australian ex-pat and future Welcome bassist Jo Klaxton and drummer Lenni Rennals. They released one full-length album and one three-song EP on La Push Records. Following Bernier's exit from that band he joined Olympia's Bunnyfoot Charm. Don Blair went on to play drums in Totfinder along with ex-Sleep Capsule member Russ Klatt. He now plays in the experimental band Waves.

Original drummer and founding member Robert Christie was killed in a car accident on February 7, 2001 in Oregon, along with his wife Denise and two sons, Ted and John.

=== Reunion ===
In 2025, Larsen considered getting the band back together, calling up Blair and resurrecting the project. They spent time recording a new album, Critters Encore, which released in June 2026 jointly with K Records and Perennial. A single, "Don't Fuck With Your Luck". had been previously released in March. Larsen and Blair are the only members, while Critters used different bassists to put together the album.

== Influence ==
Some Velvet Sidewalk songs have been covered by several artists. Crayon recorded a version of "Pumpkin Patch" and The Pastels recorded and released a version of "Boardwalkin'". “Mousetrap” has been recorded by The Thirsty Giants (2023), Skin A Buck (Open Up and Bleed, 2020), Jeneric (2015) and the Greek noise-rock group Postblue (Phase, 2004). A version of the song “Snow.” was recorded and released by Australian group Half. Artists that have performed Some Velvet Sidewalk songs live include Spider and the Webs (“Dinosaur”) ,Oswald 5-0 (“Loch Ness”) and New Zealand group Threat.Meet.Protocol.

Chat Pile singer Raygun Busch has cited Some Velvet Sidewalk as inspiration for his stage performance style. In a 2023 interview for Gut Feeling, Adam Miller of Chromatics stated “the first show I ever did was when I had this band called Pumpkin Patch, which was named after a Some Velvet Sidewalk song.”

Some Velvet Sidewalk is mentioned in the poem “My 1993” by acclaimed poet and critic Stephanie Burt, which is included in the book We Are Mermaids (2022, Graywolf Press)

In the published journals of Kurt Cobain, Journals, the Nirvana singer/guitarist included Some Velvet Sidewalk in a list with the heading “bands I like.”

== Band members ==
=== Current members ===
- Al Larsen - vocals, guitar
- Don Blair - drums (1990–1997, 2025-present)

=== Former members ===
- Robert Christie - drums (1987–1989, died 2001)
- Jenny Olay - guitar, vocals (1988-1990)
- Tobi Vail - drums (1990)
- Louise Olsen - bass (1990)
- Martin Bernier - bass (1990–1997)
- Ryan Baldoz - rhythm guitar (1994–1995)
- Paul Schuster - keyboard (1996–1997)

== Discography ==
=== Albums ===
- From Playground 'Til Now (1988)
- Appetite for Extinction (1990)
- Avalanche (1992)
- Whirlpool (1994)
- Shipwreck (1995)
- Generate! (1997)
- Critters Encore (2026)

=== EPs ===
- I Scream (EP) (1993)
- The Lowdown (EP) (1997)

=== Singles ===
- "I Know" (1988)
- "Land and Earthbound" (1989)
- "Pumpkin Patch" (1991)
- "Eyes Like Yours" (1992)
- "Free from It" (1994)
- "Valley of the Clock" (1997)
- "Don't Fuck With Your Luck" (2026)

=== Compilation appearances ===
- Throw: The Yoyo Studio Compilation (1991)
- Kill Rock Stars (1991)
- International Pop Underground Convention (1992)
- International Hip Swing (1993)
- Original Love Rock Masters (1999)
