= Mecca Normal =

Indie rock band

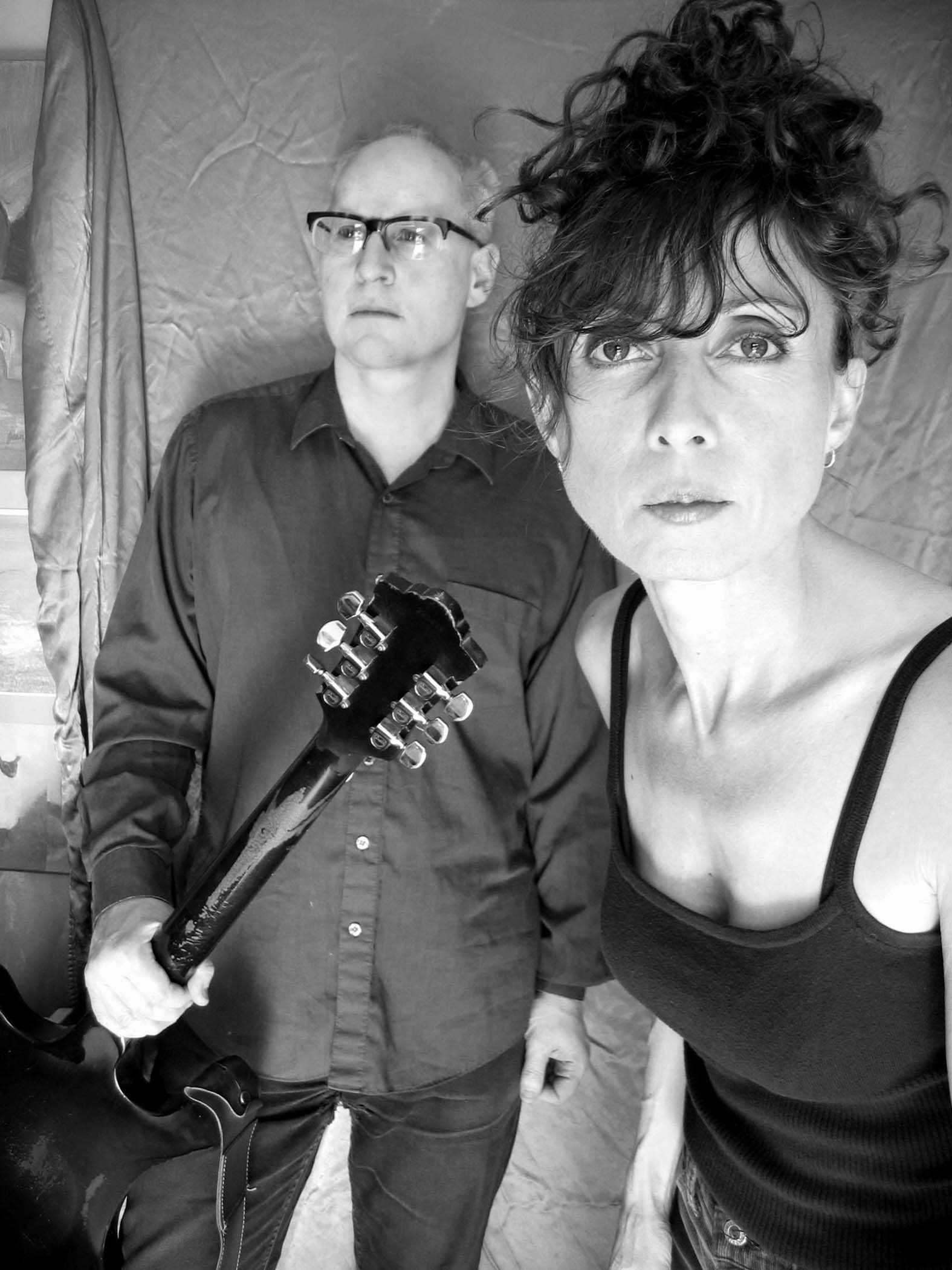
- Mecca Normal in 2009

Background information
- Origin: Vancouver, British Columbia, Canada
- Genres: Indie rock
- Years active: 1984–present
- Labels: Smarten Up!, K Records, Kill Rock Stars, Matador Records
- Members: Jean Smith; David Lester

Mecca Normal is a two-piece indie rock band from Vancouver, British Columbia, Canada, formed by Jean Smith and David Lester in 1984.

== Career ==
In 1985, they formed their own record label Smarten Up! to release their debut album. Subsequently, Mecca Normal had full-length releases on some of the largest indie labels of the 1990s, with albums on K Records, Kill Rock Stars, Matador Records, and Smarten Up! and a 7" single released by Sub Pop. Smarten Up! later merged with Lester's small press publishing company Get To The Point to form the label Smarten Up! & Get To The Point on which they released an album in 2003.

Much of Mecca Normal's album The Observer (Kill Rock Stars, 2006) was inspired by Smith's experiences using online dating websites.

== Discography ==
- Mecca Normal (Smarten Up!, 1986)
- Calico Kills The Cat (K Records, 1988)
- Water Cuts My Hands (K Records, 1991)
- Dovetail (K Records, 1992)
- Jarred Up (K Records, 1993)
- Flood Plain (K Records, 1993)
- Sitting on Snaps (Matador Records, 1995)
- The Eagle And The Poodle (Matador Records, 1996)
- Who Shot Elvis? (Matador Records, 1997)
- The Family Swan (Kill Rock Stars, 2002)
- Janis Zeppelin (Smarten Up!, 2003)
- The Observer (Kill Rock Stars, 2006)
- Empathy for the Evil (M'lady's Records, 2014)
- Brave New Waves Session (Artoffact, 2019)
