= K Records =

Independent record label in Olympia, Washington

- Founded: 1982
- Founder: Calvin Johnson; Candice Pedersen
- Distributor: Redeye Distribution
- Genre: Twee pop, indie rock, punk rock
- Country of origin: U.S.
- Location: Olympia, Washington
- Official website: krecs.com

K Records is an independent record label in Olympia, Washington, founded in 1982. Artists on the label included early releases by Beck, Modest Mouse and Built to Spill. The record label has been called "key to the development of independent music" since the 1980s.

The label was founded by Beat Happening frontman Calvin Johnson and managed for many years by Candice Pedersen. Many early releases were on the cassette tape format, making the label one of the longest lasting reflections of the cassette culture of the 1970s and early 1980s. Although itself releasing primarily offbeat pop music and indie rock, the DIY label is regarded as one of the pioneers of riot grrrl movement and the second wave of American punk in the 1990s.

== History ==
Calvin Johnson founded K Records with the intention of distributing cassette tapes of a local band, The Supreme Cool Beings, which he had recorded performing for his radio show at Evergreen State College radio station KAOS (FM). According to author Gina Arnold, the name "K" originally stood for "knowledge"—as in knowledge of regional underground music scenes and of music in general. Johnson, however, has stated that "it's unclear why the name is K."

K was run from Johnson's kitchen in Olympia until January 1986, when he hired Candice Pedersen for $20 a week and academic credit at Evergreen State College. Pedersen became a full partner in 1989 until selling her half of the label to Johnson in 1999. In 2016, Pedersen told The Stranger that the separation was on "bad terms," and that Calvin had reluctantly agreed to a payment plan for her share, to be paid back over 20 years.

The label's first vinyl record release was the 1984 Beat Happening 45, "Our Secret / What's Important," but the great bulk of the label's early releases were made on the medium of cassette tapes, with "about 20" cassette releases noted in a 1986 Flipside interview, in addition to "4 more in the works."

Johnson noted:

A cassette is great for a local scene like Olympia because a band can release a cassette and not have to spend their would-be savings. If they were to press 500 records, there goes their savings. But if you do a cassette you make up as many as you need, they're cheap, and if you don't sell them you just use them.

This large group of local cassette-only releases was built into a mail order distribution business, which eventually become a full-time job for Johnson and Pederson. A newsletter was put out in support of the mail order operation, which in 1986 had a circulation of about 2,000. The label also benefited from an early distribution deal with Rough Trade Records in 1985.

K's distribution roster expanded as Johnson reached out to independent acts he discovered through his radio show at KAOS-FM. Acts would receive distribution through K newsletters and cassette compilations.

Mariella Luz, a long-standing employee, is currently the general manager. In 2016, several artists on the K roster shared concerns about missed royalties from the label, with The Moldy Peaches singer and solo act Kimya Dawson describing the label as a "broken, sinking ship." Phil Elverum of the Microphones and Jared Warren of KARP also spoke on the record about late royalty payments and difficulties engaging the label. Johnson said K would liquidate its holdings to make good on its debts to artists, but stated that the label was not in jeopardy.

=== International Pop Underground ===
In 1987, K Records shifted from cassette distribution to vinyl single production with the launch of the "International Pop Underground" series. During that year, K Records released 10 vinyl singles, which put the label in regular contract with distributors and increasing their interest in K's releases. This batch of releases included a new Beat Happening single "Look Around" and the first of the label's many Mecca Normal releases.

Over time, the series would include releases from artists including Teenage Fanclub, Mirah, The Microphones, Make-Up, Thee Headcoats, and Built to Spill.

In 1991, K Records organized the week-long International Pop Underground Convention. This event featured more than fifty independent and punk bands, including Bikini Kill, Beat Happening, Fugazi, L7, Unwound, and Jad Fair. It has been called "a remarkable testament of musical self-preservation and fierce resistance to corporate takeover." The music festival included arts and crafts, film presentations, and poetry readings, and was notable for its deliberate lack of hired security officers.

=== Dub Narcotic Studio ===
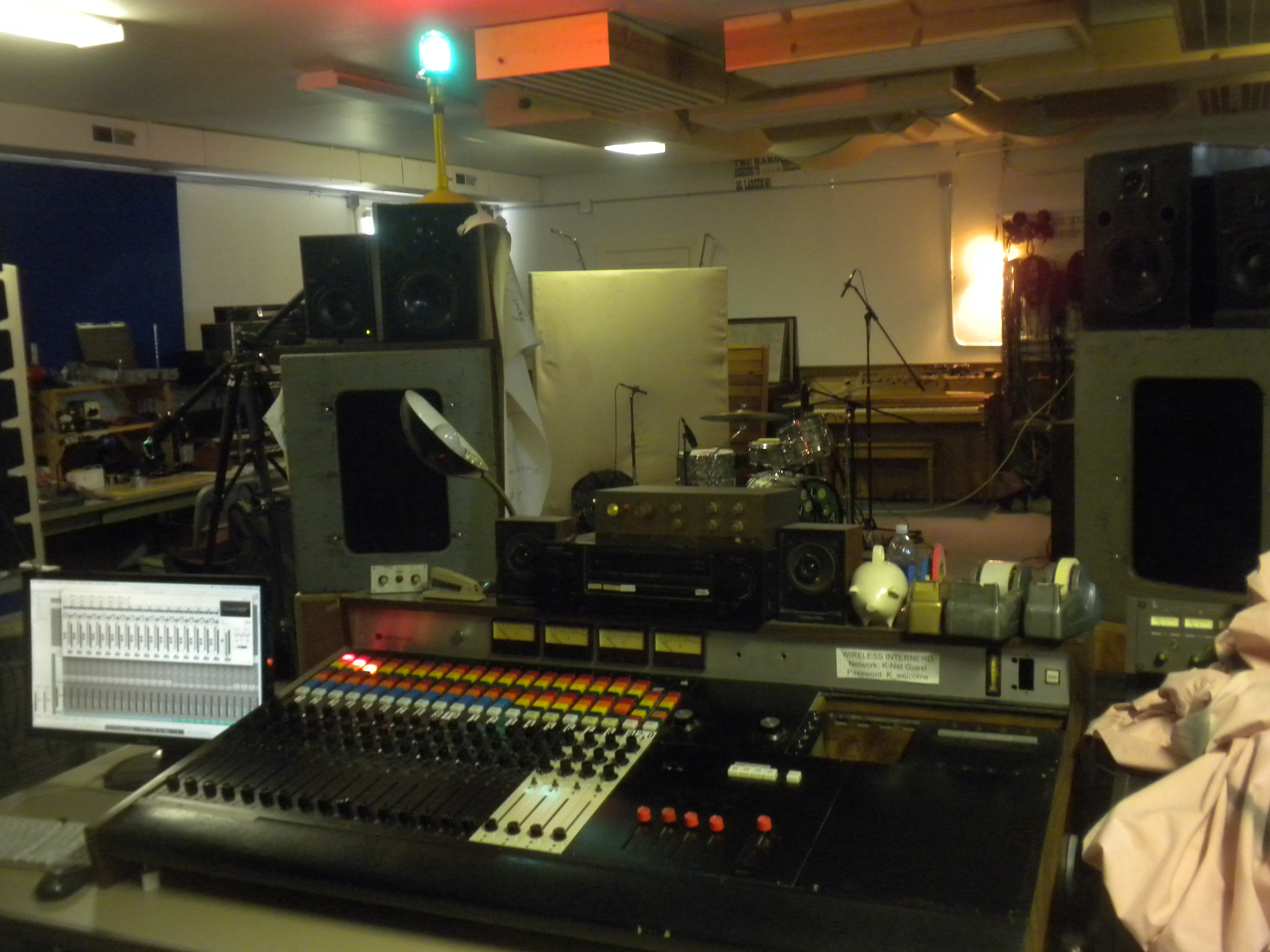
Interior of Dub Narcotic Studio

In 1993, Johnson converted a small basement space into a recording studio, which he named Dub Narcotic Studio. The arrangement allowed him to host musicians while recording, and to experiment with studio engineering techniques. Beck recorded One Foot in the Grave for K Records at Dub Narcotic, which became its most financially successful record. Other albums recorded at the studio include early Modest Mouse albums, Johnson's eponymous Dub Narcotic Sound System project, and The Halo Benders' God Don't Make No Junk album.

The studio was relocated to the former Olympia Knitting Mills building in the late 1990s, and added a 16-track tape machine. The extra space meant the studio could serve as offices for K Records and provide artist and musician housing. Other businesses in the mill included independent musician service companies offering services such as tour booking, promotion, and artist studio space. In 2016, Johnson acknowledged that the studio hadn't generated the income he had anticipated for the label.

Then an Evergreen State College student, Phil Elverum of the Microphones recorded his first album, Tests (1998), after being given the keys to the studio. Elverum became a fixture of the Dub Narcotic control room. Among albums recorded by Elverum at the studio were the Jon Spencer Blues Explosion. The debut record by Arrington de Dionyso, an Evergreen student with an internship at K, was recorded and released on K as Old Time Relijun. Elverum also recorded Mirah Tov Zeitlyn, known as Mirah, at the studio. These acts helped define a new era of the K Records sound, which shifted its emphasis and started producing records known for their experimental production techniques while maintaining their lo-fi authenticity.

== Influence ==
=== Philosophy ===
Though the label was part of the punk and underground scenes of the 1980s, the term has reflected the label's philosophy more than the sound of its roster.

Al Larsen of the band Some Velvet Sidewalk was part of the K Roster. In 1989, he wrote an article for the Snipehunt zine which reflected and distinguished K's approach to "punk" music with an ethos he called "Love Rock," in which he wrote: "It's a scary world, but we don't need to be scared anymore. We need active visionary protest, we need to grab hold and make the transformation, from complaining that there is NO FUTURE to insisting there be a future." This manifesto, which focused on a DIY ethic, became an unofficial label philosophy.

This philosophy viewed lo-fi, homemade projects as a preferred alternative to corporate culture, which maintained a philosophical link to punk. The first K Records newsletter includes the K shield as a knight, described as battling "the many-armed corporate ogre."

Some critics have considered this philosophy to be a liability in regards to mainstream success. Author Mark Baumgarten has observed that Pitchfork Media's "Top 200 Tracks of the 1990s" included six bands with direct relationships to the label (Bikini Kill, Sleater-Kinney, Fugazi, Built to Spill, Beck, and Nirvana) but only one proper K Records release.

=== Twee punk ===
Early K releases included childlike, hand-drawn album art. Combined with the stripped-down toy-instrument aesthetic of Beat Happening and distribution of bands such as Heavenly in the US, the label was quickly associated with the twee music scene. Johnson has been called "the first star of American twee."

Critics have suggested that the "twee" label for K Records acts reflects its rejection of the hardcore punk ethos popular in the 1980s, and that K Records acts were subverting "punk" through confronting and threatening masculine sensibilities within the punk scene.

=== Riot Grrl movement ===
The Love Rock philosophy also made room for a feminist approach to punk, which had existed in Olympia, WA just as K Records became an established presence in the town. The region's early punk acts, such as The Accident and Neo Boys, included women. Women artists such as Lois Maffeo and Stella Marrs were early champions of K Records and appeared on its roster.

Rock critic Michael Azerrad writes that K was "a major force in widening the idea of a punk rocker from a mohawked guy in a motorcycle jacket to a nerdy girl in a cardigan". That the label was co-owned by a woman reflected an openness to women's participation. Pedersen is quoted in Tobi Vail's Riot Grrrl zine, Jigsaw, saying "I think it's really important that people know there are women ... girls who ... do more than package up things. ... It's really important that people to know that there are girls out there making decisions and doing stuff."

While Pederson was behind the scenes, acts like Mecca Normal, and Heather Lewis' presence in K's flagship band, Beat Happening, have been mentioned as an inspiration for many female-fronted bands at the time.

The label also highlighted women in its International Pop Underground Convention's opening night at the Capitol theater, "Love Rock Revolution Girl Style Now", or "Girls Rock Night", dedicated to 15 female-led acts such as Bratmobile, Olympia's first exclusively-female group, and featuring bands with future members of Sleater-Kinney and Bikini Kill.

Many riot grrrl acts would release through another Olympia label, Kill Rock Stars, which launched with a compilation record at the International Pop Underground Convention. Though Kill Rock Stars would have financial conflicts with K Records over the compilation, Bikini Kill and others moved to Kill Rock Stars out of an aesthetic preference for the "grungier" sound of its releases, and there is no evidence of ill-will. Corin Tucker of Sleater-Kinney has said "It's not that we didn't love Calvin and love K; it's just that this new thing that was starting was going to be so exciting."

=== Partnerships ===
==== Dischord ====
In 1989, Johnson met with Dischord Records head and Fugazi frontman Ian MacKaye, who introduced Johnson to the post-hardcore band Nation of Ulysses. The two agreed to release their album through a joint venture, DisKord Records, which also released Autoclave's 1991 release "Go Far." This partnership was also responsible for co-tours between Olympia and Washington, DC–based punk acts.

==== Kill Rock Stars ====
The Kill Rock Stars label, also based in Olympia, had produced exclusively spoken word until Calvin encouraged the label to release a compilation record of local music acts ahead of its International Pop Underground Convention; Calvin provided half of the recordings for the record. With the mainstream success of Nirvana, whose track "Beeswax" was exclusive to the compilation, demand was high enough for K Records to work out a distribution deal with Kill Rock Stars. Collection of the royalties, and distribution of those royalties to Kill Rock Stars, was a matter of disagreement between the labels, and the two ended their working relationship.

=== References in pop culture ===
- Los Campesinos! cite a 'K Records T-shirt' in the song "Knee Deep At ATP", while early single "The International Tweexcore Underground" directly alludes to the label's International Pop Underground.
- Nothing Painted Blue released a song "K for Karnival" which is partially a tribute to K Records; it repeats "Who put the shield around the K?" several times, referring to the interstate-style shield around the letter K in the K Records logo.
- Kurt Cobain had the K Records logo guitar sticker on his white Fender Stratocaster and tattoo on his forearm, saying it was to "try and remind me to stay a child." The song "Lounge Act" on Nevermind references his logo tattoo in the line, “I'll arrest myself and wear a shield.” Cobain also played guitar on a K Records release, "Bikini Twilight," with Johnson, released as The Go Team.
- The Hole song "Olympia" (credited as "Rock Star" on Live Through This) was changed on a performance on the John Peel show to reference Johnson and K Records.
- The Norwich Pop Underground Convention (2003–2007) was based on the attitudes and ethics of K's International Pop Underground Convention.
- The Philadelphia indie rock band Strange Ranger's 2015 song titled, "Stinks To Be You" has a line of lyrics referencing the label "In '89 I'd sign to K, In '92 you'd think I'm cool".

== Roster ==
The following artists have released albums through K Records.

- Adrian Orange
- All Girl Summer Fun Band
- Beat Happening
- Beck
- Bikini Kill
- Bis
- The Blackouts
- Karl Blau
- The Blow
- Built to Spill
- Cadallaca
- Chain and the Gang
- Chicks on Speed
- The Crabs
- D+
- Sarah Dougher
- Dub Narcotic Sound System
- Electrosexual
- Eprhyme
- Fifth Column
- fish narc
- Steve Fisk
- Gaze
- Girl Trouble
- The Go Team
- The Halo Benders
- Heavenly
- Jeremy Jay
- Calvin Johnson
- Karp
- Kimya Dawson
- Kiwi Jr.
- LAKE
- Landing
- Lois
- Love as Laughter
- Lync
- Maher Shalal Hash Baz
- Mahjongg
- Make-Up
- Marine Research
- Mecca Normal
- Melvins
- The Microphones / Mount Eerie
- Mirah
- Miranda July
- Mopar Stars
- Modest Mouse
- Now
- Old Time Relijun
- Anna Oxygen
- Pansy Division
- The Pine Hill Haints
- The Rondelles
- Saturday Looks Good To Me
- Sharp Pins
- Shonen Knife
- Snuff
- The Softies
- Talulah Gosh
- Some Velvet Sidewalk
- Tender Trap
- Thee Headcoats
- Tiger Trap
- Trans FX
- Yume Bitsu

== See also ==
- List of record labels
