= Sleater-Kinney discography =

Cataloging of published recordings by Sleater-Kinney

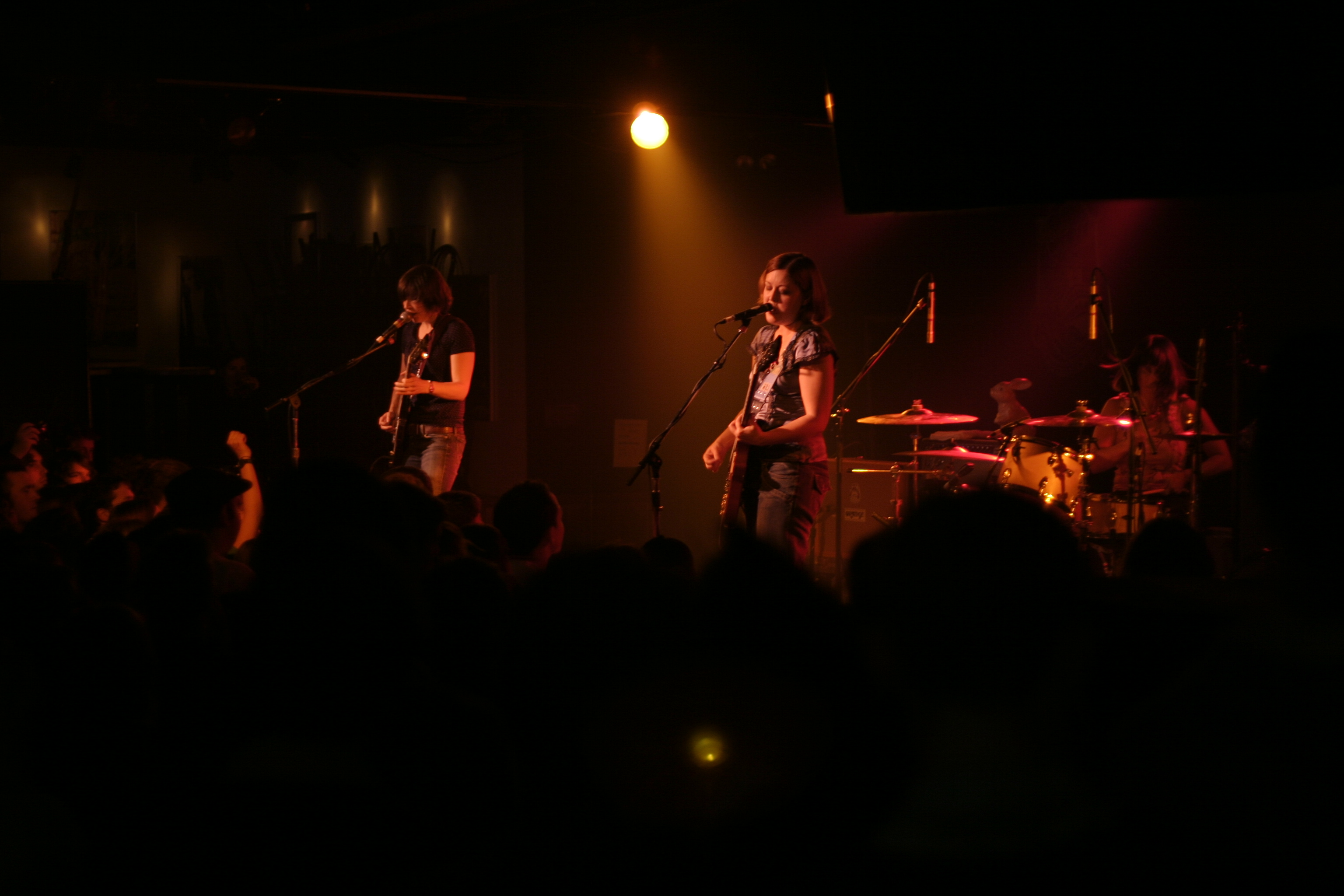
- Sleater-Kinney in 2005
- Studio albums: 11
- Live albums: 1
- Compilation albums: 1
- Singles: 17
- Music videos: 9

Sleater-Kinney is an American rock band that formed in Olympia, Washington in 1994. The band's discography consists of 11 studio albums, one live album, one compilation box set, 16 singles, and nine music videos. The band released their debut album, Sleater-Kinney, in 1995 on the independent record label Chainsaw Records. The band's second album, Call the Doctor, was released in 1996 to critical acclaim, cementing the band's reputation as one of the major musical acts from the Pacific Northwest. Dig Me Out, Sleater-Kinney's third album, was released the following year on Kill Rock Stars. It became one of their most successful albums, appearing on several publications' best album lists.

Sleater-Kinney released their fourth album, The Hot Rock, in 1999. The Hot Rock became the band's first album that entered the US Billboard Top 200 chart. Their next album, All Hands on the Bad One, was released in 2000 and received a nomination for Outstanding Music Album at the 12th Annual Gay and Lesbian Alliance Against Defamation Awards. One Beat, Sleater-Kinney's sixth album, followed in 2002 and met with high critical praise. Sleater-Kinney released their seventh album, The Woods, in 2005 on Sub Pop. The album produced the singles "Entertain" and "Jumpers". In 2006, the band announced an indefinite hiatus. The band's first seven albums had sold a combined total of 583,000 copies in the United States by October 2014.

After a ten-year hiatus, Sleater-Kinney released their eighth studio album, No Cities to Love, in 2015.

== Studio albums ==
Title	Details	Peak chart positions				Sales
Title	Details	US	US Heat.	US Indie	UK	Sales
Sleater-Kinney	Released: June 25, 1995; Label: Chainsaw (CHSW #12); Formats: CD, LP	—	—	—	—	US: 25,000
Call the Doctor	Released: March 25, 1996; Label: Chainsaw (CHSW #13); Formats: CD, LP	—	—	—	—	US: 60,000
Dig Me Out	Released: April 8, 1997; Label: Kill Rock Stars (KRS #279); Formats: CD, LP	—	—	—	—	US: 130,000
The Hot Rock	Released: February 23, 1999; Label: Kill Rock Stars (KRS #321); Formats: CD, LP	181	12	—	—	US: 97,000
All Hands on the Bad One	Released: May 2, 2000; Label: Kill Rock Stars (KRS #360); Formats: CD, LP	177	12	—	156	US: 98,000
One Beat	Released: August 20, 2002; Label: Kill Rock Stars (KRS #387); Formats: CD, LP	107	2	5	—	US: 90,000
The Woods	Released: May 24, 2005; Label: Sub Pop (SP #670); Formats: CD, LP	80	—	2	143	US: 94,000
No Cities to Love	Released: January 20, 2015; Label: Sub Pop (SP #1100); Formats: CD, LP, download	18 (Note: No Cities to Love also peaked at number 13 on the Billboard Top Album Sales chart.)	—	2	27	US: 28,000
The Center Won't Hold	Released: August 16, 2019; Label: Mom + Pop; Formats: CD, LP, download, streaming	27 (Note: The Center Won't Hold also peaked at number 4 on the Billboard Top Album Sales chart.)	—	—	45	
Path of Wellness	Released: June 11, 2021; Label: Mom + Pop; Formats: CD, LP, download	— (Note: Path of Wellness did not enter the Billboard 200, but peaked at number 46 on the Billboard Top Album Sales chart.)	—	—	—	
Little Rope	Released: January 19, 2024; Label: Loma Vista; Formats: CD, LP, download, streaming	— (Note: Little Rope did not enter the Billboard 200, but peaked at number 23 on the Billboard Top Album Sales chart.)	—	—	—	
"—" denotes a recording that did not chart.

== Live albums ==
Title	Details	Certifications
Live in Paris	Released: January 27, 2017; Label: Sub Pop (SP #1191); Formats: CD, LP, cassette	Russia (Gold - 10,000 copies, as of June 2018)

== Compilations ==
Title	Details	Sales
Start Together	Released: October 21, 2014; Label: Sub Pop (SP #1110); Formats: CD, LP	3,000 (as of February 2015)

== Singles ==
List of singles, with selected chart positions, showing year released and album name

Title	Year	Peak chart positions		Album
Title	Year	US AAA	UK	Album
"You Ain't It!"	1994	—	—	Non-album singles
"Big Big Lights" (split w/ Cypher in the Snow)	1998	—	—	Non-album singles
"One More Hour"	1998	—	153	Dig Me Out
"Little Babies"	1998	—	147	Dig Me Out
"Get Up"	1999	—	98	The Hot Rock
"A Quarter to Three/Burn, Don't Freeze"	1999	—	157	The Hot Rock
"You're No Rock n' Roll Fun"	2000	—	85	All Hands on the Bad One
"Entertain"	2005	—	112	The Woods
"Jumpers"	2005	—	—	The Woods
"Bury Our Friends"	2014	—	—	No Cities to Love
"Hurry On Home"	2019	35	—	The Center Won't Hold
"Can I Go On"	2019	24	—	The Center Won't Hold
"Animal"	2019	—	—	Non-album single
"Worry with You"	2021	19	—	Path of Wellness
"High in the Grass"	2021	—	—	Path of Wellness
"Method"	2021	—	—	Path of Wellness
"Hell"	2023	—	—	Little Rope
"Say It Like You Mean It"	2023	27	—	Little Rope
"—" denotes a recording that did not chart or was not released in that territory.

== Music videos ==
Title	Details	Album
"Get Up"	Released: February 1999; Director: Miranda July	The Hot Rock
"You're No Rock n' Roll Fun"	Released: May 2, 2000; Director: Brett Vapnek	All Hands on the Bad One
"Entertain"	Released: June 22, 2005; Director: Molly and Mariah	The Woods
"Jumpers"	Release: October 7, 2005; Director: Matt McCormick	The Woods
"Modern Girl" (live)	Released: August 22, 2006; Director: Christoph Green	The Woods
"Bury Our Friends"	Released: October 20, 2014; Director: Miranda July	No Cities to Love
"A New Wave"	Released: February 19, 2015; Director: Bernard Derriman	No Cities to Love
"Can I Go On"	Released: September 5, 2019; Director: Ashley Connor	The Center Won't Hold
"Love"	Released: November 14, 2019; Director: Lance Bangs	The Center Won't Hold

== Other appearances ==
Song	Album	Year
"You Ain't It!"	Move Into The Villa Villakula	1994
"Write Me Back, Fucker"	Move Into The Villa Villakula	1994
"More Than a Feeling"	Move Into The Villa Villakula	1994
"I Wanna Be Your Joey Ramone"	All Over Me: Original Motion Picture Soundtrack	1997
"It's Enough"	CMJ New Music: Volume 48, August 1997	1997
"Get Up"	CMJ New Music: Volume 65, January 1999	1999
"Dance Song '97" (live)	Yo-Yo a Go-Go '97: Another Live Compilation	1999
"Banned from the End of the World"	Everything Is Nice: The Matador Records 10th Anniversary Anthology	1999
"The End of You"	After The Fair: 21st Century Women	2000
"What If I Was Right?"	Jackson's Jukebox	2000
"The Ballad of a Ladyman"	Turbo's Tunes	2000
"Banned from the End of the World" (live)	Yo-Yo a Go-Go 1999	2001
"The Ballad of a Ladyman" (live)	Calling All Kings & Queens	2001
"Maraca"	Group (Soundtrack)	2002
"Oh!"	Mollie's Mix	2003
"Combat Rock"	Peace Not War	2003
"Angry Inch" (with Fred Schneider)	Wig in a Box: Songs from and Inspired by Hedwig and the Angry Inch	2003
"Off With Your Head"	Rock Against Bush, Vol. 2	2004
"Off With Your Head"	Future Soundtrack for America	2004
"Entertain"	Songbook of Songs	2004
"Turn It On"	Whatever: The '90s Pop & Culture Box	2005
"Jumpers" (live)	Live at KEXP, Vol. 2	2006
"Step Aside"	Safe Haven, A Benefit for SMYRC	2006
"Jumpers" (live)	The L Word: Season Three Soundtrack	2006
"Modern Girl"	Rough Trade Shops: Counter Culture 05	2006
"Step Aside"	Wed-Rock: A Benefit for Freedom To Marry	2006
"Fortunate Son" (live)	Wed-Rock: A Benefit for Freedom To Marry	2006
"You're No Rock n' Roll Fun" (live)	Metro: The Official Bootleg Series, Volume 1	2010
"Here we Come"	7-inches for Planned Parenthood	2017
