= Start Together =

2014 compilation box set by Sleater-Kinney

Box set by Sleater-Kinney
- Released: October 21, 2014
- Recorded: 1995–2014
- Genre: Punk rock
- Length: 268:08
- Label: Sub Pop

Sleater-Kinney chronology
The Woods (2005)	Start Together (2014)	No Cities to Love (2015)

Start Together is compilation box set containing remasters of albums by the American rock band Sleater-Kinney. A digital version of the box set was released on September 2, 2014. Three thousand limited edition physical copies of the box set were released on colored vinyl with a 44-page companion book on October 21, 2014. The box set also included a 7" single of the song "Bury Our Friends" from their 2015 album No Cities to Love.

== Critical reception ==
Professional ratings
Aggregate scores
Source	Rating
Metacritic	94/100
Review scores
Source	Rating
AllMusic	4.5/5 stars
The Guardian	5/5 stars
Pitchfork	9.2/10

Jenn Pelly of Pitchfork praised the compilation box set, stating that "Start Together tells the unlikely story of how this band carried the wildfire of '90s Oly-punk to pastures of more ambitious musicality—a decade that moves from caterwauling shrieks to glowing lyricism, from barebones snark to Zep-length improv, from personal-political to outright (left) political."

== Contents ==
1. Sleater Kinney
2. Call the Doctor
3. Dig Me Out
4. The Hot Rock
5. All Hands on the Bad One
6. One Beat
7. The Woods
8. "Bury Our Friends" (single)

== Charts ==
Chart (2014)	Peak position
US Billboard 200	176
US Independent Albums (Billboard)	37
US Top Rock Albums (Billboard)	43
