= One Beat =

Studio album by Sleater-Kinney
- Released: August 20, 2002
- Recorded: March–April 2002
- Studio: Jackpot!, Portland, Oregon
- Genre: Punk rock
- Length: 43:27
- Label: Kill Rock Stars
- Producer: John Goodmanson

Sleater-Kinney chronology
All Hands on the Bad One (2000)	One Beat (2002)	The Woods (2005)

One Beat is the sixth studio album by the American rock band Sleater-Kinney, released on August 20, 2002, by Kill Rock Stars. It was produced by John Goodmanson and recorded between March and April 2002 at Jackpot! Studio in Portland, Oregon. The album peaked at number 107 in the United States on the Billboard 200 and entered the Billboard Top Independent Albums at number five. One Beat was very well received by critics. Praise centered on its cathartic musical delivery and progressive politics.

== Background and recording ==
One Beat is the follow-up to Sleater-Kinney's highly acclaimed fifth album All Hands on the Bad One, released in 2000. Before entering the studio, Sleater-Kinney practiced in drummer Janet Weiss's basement. The band conceived the album to be "the voice in the silence" following the terrorist attacks in the U.S. on September 11, 2001. Vocalists and guitarists Corin Tucker and Carrie Brownstein did not follow a set of blueprints when crafting the songs; rather, they simply worked off each other's input and proceeded in a piecemeal way. The album took longer to write than its predecessor. As Tucker explains, "the songs are more intricate and require a lot more arranging and tweaking. Our creativity really channeled us to that place."

Speaking about the development of the songs in a concert setting, Weiss has said, "The live forum is where we get the feedback from the people who we're really interested in communicating with."

One Beat was produced by long-time collaborator John Goodmanson, who came from the same educational background as Sleater-Kinney and recorded with most of the acts signed to Kill Rock Stars. Weiss has stated that Goodmanson has a "unique" way of working with the band. Both parties decided to steer the album in a challenging new direction. In a later interview, Brownstein commented that "sometimes when we would want to do new things, he would be like, 'oh god, everyone would freak out if we did that, we can't do that!'". After the recording sessions, Tucker indicated that she viewed the record's final mix as "a vast, sweeping landscape" that is the most fully formed release in the band's discography.

== Music and lyrics ==
Brownstein has referred to the album as a "strident and pointed political record, in terms of the lyrics". The album contains some of Sleater-Kinney's most polemical songs; "Far Away" explicitly references the September 11 terrorist attacks and contains criticism of American president George W. Bush. Corin Tucker said that it "wasn't really a conscious decision" to write about the attacks, but there was "just such as an overwhelming presence in our minds as we were trying to write songs, that we felt that we really needed to deal with it, and that we really needed to write about it". The album's lyrics were also prominently influenced by the recent birth of Tucker's son Marshall Tucker Bangs. According to Tucker, "Marshall is all over One Beat. The last year was definitely a difficult time for me, as he was born nine weeks premature and he was in the hospital for a while. It was the hardest thing that I've ever lived through, that fear and anxiety, and I think I was able to let go into the music." The song "Sympathy" was written about the "terrifying" experience of Marshall's premature birth. "Hollywood Ending" attacks the concept of celebrity and the mainstream female body image.

Brownstein described the album's overall sound by saying, "I think of Dig Me Out and The Hot Rock as the two ends of the spectrum and it's kind of been combined on this record. And then we also pushed ourselves beyond that". Goodmanson said that "To me, it's not a record that's built for alternative radio. Yet, surprisingly, the reaction from everyone I've played it for has been like, 'Wow, these guys are really going for it'". The songs "Far Away" and "Combat Rock" are both politically conscious songs, while "Step Aside" references "the violence of the world outside" and the domestic responsibilities of motherhood. The track incorporates a horn section. In One Beat, Carrie Brownstein plays her guitar in the style of Document-era Peter Buck, the guitarist of R.E.M. The album contains the use of wah-wah pedals, synthesizers, sing-along choruses, and hints of blues music. The song "Prisstina" features backup vocals, synthesizers and guitars by American musician and composer Stephen Trask. Musically, Lawrence Journal-World likened a good portion of the album to The Scream-era Siouxsie and the Banshees.

== Promotion and release ==
Before the release, Brownstein took time off to act in an independent film, Group, which documents a group of women meeting each week in therapy sessions.

In March 2002, Sleater-Kinney previewed tracks from One Beat during a series of U.S. East Coast performances and at the All Tomorrow's Parties festival in Los Angeles. The album's track list was confirmed in May. At the start of August, the band posted the 12 songs as QuickTime streams on the Kill Rock Stars label website.

One Beat was released on August 20, 2002, by Kill Rock Stars. Alongside the standard edition, a limited edition of the album was also made available for purchase. Both the CD and Vinyl limited edition featured a second disc containing two bonus tracks, "Off With Your Head" and "Lions and Tigers".

Upon release, the album reached No. 107 on the U.S. Billboard 200 chart, No. 2 on the Heatseekers Albums chart, and No. 5 on the Independent Albums chart.

To promote the album, Sleater-Kinney performed at a street festival in Los Angeles alongside Sonic Youth on the weekend of August 25. The band embarked on an extensive U.S. tour in support of One Beat at the start of September. The tour started with a concert at the Bluebird Theatre in Denver on September 11, which coincided with the one-year anniversary of the 9/11 terrorist attacks, and ended with a gig at the 40 Watt Club in Athens, Georgia, on October 24. Sleater-Kinney continued touring with the album for two years, during which time they secured a support slot on Pearl Jam's U.S. tour.

The album was remastered and reissued in 2014.

== Critical reception ==
Professional ratings
Aggregate scores
Source	Rating
Metacritic	85/100
Review scores
Source	Rating
AllMusic	4/5 stars
Blender	5/5 stars
Entertainment Weekly	B+
The Guardian	4/5 stars
NME	7/10
Pitchfork	9.1/10
Q	4/5 stars
Rolling Stone	4/5 stars
Spin	8/10
The Village Voice	A

Media response to One Beat was highly favorable; aggregating website Metacritic reported a normalized rating of 85 out of 100 based on 22 critical reviews, indicating "universal acclaim". Prominent music critic Robert Christgau, writing for The Village Voice, explained that Sleater-Kinney aim for "defiant uplift" and seem energized by the challenge. Neva Chonin of Rolling Stone pointed out that the trio's "riotous manifesto remains the same". Victoria Segal of NME stated, "Few bands could explore motherhood and terrorism without making you want to shoot them: Corin Tucker's electric-shock voice and the adrenal guitars make them... essential pop topics".

AllMusic reviewer Steve Huey commented that Sleater-Kinney sometimes sacrifices immediacy for angular melodies and riffs that "don't catch hold", but gave One Beat a rating of four stars out of five by noting that its "musical progression is still extremely impressive". Drowned in Sound's Becky Stefani indicated that listening to the record makes one feel that "all is well in alternative music". Douglas Wolk of Blender gave the album a maximum rating of five stars out of five by indicating that the band "swagger like they never have before, eschewing the filler that made their last few records drag".

== Legacy ==
As of November 2004, the album had sold 73,000 copies in the U.S. according to Nielsen SoundScan. As of February 2015, One Beat had sold 90,000 copies.

One Beat was ranked at number five in the Pazz & Jop poll run by The Village Voice, which surveyed 695 critics to find the best albums of 2002, while The Boston Phoenix included it in its unnumbered list of The Best Albums of 2002. Similarly, CMJ New Music Report placed the record at number 6 in its Top 10 of 2002 list. Spin ranked One Beat at number 12 in its list of "Albums of the Year" for 2002; staff writer Caryn Ganz praised it as Sleater-Kinney's "sharpest statement yet". Pitchfork placed the record at number 14 in its end-of-year list for 2002; contributor Brendan Reid wrote, "Years at the top haven't dulled their willingness to take risks, and that's just what they do, spectacularly, on One Beat".

== Track listing ==
All music is composed by Sleater-Kinney.

No.	Title	Length
1.	"One Beat"	3:08
2.	"Far Away"	3:45
3.	"Oh!"	3:56
4.	"The Remainder"	3:36
5.	"Light Rail Coyote"	3:09
6.	"Step Aside"	3:44
7.	"Combat Rock"	4:47
8.	"O2"	3:30
9.	"Funeral Song"	2:47
10.	"Prisstina"	3:31
11.	"Hollywood Ending"	3:19
12.	"Sympathy"	4:15
Total length:		43:27

== Personnel ==
Credits are adapted from One Beat's album notes.

Sleater-Kinney

- Carrie Brownstein – guitar, vocals
- Corin Tucker – vocals, guitar
- Janet Weiss – drums, percussion, vocals

Additional musicians

- Stephen Trask – background vocals, synthesiser, guitar
- Steve Fisk – keyboards
- Sam Coomes – theremin
- John Goodmanson – EBow guitar
- Mike Wayland – alto saxophone, tenor saxophone
- Russ Scott – trumpet
- Jen Charowhas – violin
- Brent Arnold – cello

Technical personnel

- John Goodmanson – producer
- Larry Crane – engineering
- Roger Seibel – mastering
