= Little Rope =

Studio album by Sleater-Kinney
- Released: January 19, 2024
- Studios: Flora Recording & Playback, Portland, Oregon
- Genre: Punk rock
- Length: 33:59
- Label: Loma Vista
- Producer: John Congleton

Sleater-Kinney chronology
Path of Wellness (2021)	Little Rope (2024)

Singles from Little Rope
- 1. "Hell" Released: October 3, 2023; 2. "Say It Like You Mean It" Released: November 8, 2023; 3. "Untidy Creature" Released: January 4, 2024

Singles from Little Rope (Deluxe)
- 1. "Here Today" Released: September 3, 2024; 2. "This Time" Released: October 3, 2024

Little Rope is the eleventh studio album by American rock band Sleater-Kinney, released on January 19, 2024, on Loma Vista. Produced by John Congleton, the album was preceded by the singles: "Hell", "Say It Like You Mean It", and "Untidy Creature".

Released to positive reception, Little Rope was completed in the aftermath of a deadly car accident involving band member Carrie Brownstein's mother and stepfather in late 2022. Dealing with this event, the duo had to face up to questions surrounding "how we navigate grief, who we navigate it with, and the ways it transforms us" during the recording process.

The duo were joined in the studio by touring member Angie Boylan, who recorded the album's drum parts; Death Cab for Cutie's Dave Depper; and Outer Orbit's Galen Clark.

== Background and recording ==
The idea of another Sleater-Kinney album was initially "up in the air", as an introduction video of their previous album, Path of Wellness (2021), resulted in a vague answer as to whether the duo would ever record another album. However, after the release of their tenth studio album they turned to John Congleton to produce their next record. They had planned to work with Congleton "for a long time" but had to wait for "the stars" to align. Recording took place at Flora Recording & Playback in Portland, Oregon.

Half of the record had been written prior to Brownstein's mother's death, with the remaining tracks "approached with grief hanging heavy". As a result, Little Rope deals with topics including "global crisis and personal tragedy". Described as "one of the finest, most delicately layered" within their discography, the record is enriched through "complex, ambitious instrumentation".

== Release ==
The duo announced the album on October 3, 2023, alongside the release of the single "Hell", a "moody and eerie" track with an "explosive chorus" that was billed "pure Sleater-Kinney".

On September 3, 2024, it was announced that a deluxe version of the album was planned for release on October 4, including outtakes, live recordings, and the previously-released Frayed Rope Sessions. “Here Today” and "This Time," both outtakes from Little Rope, were released as singles. The deluxe edition was released on November 1, a month after the planned release date.

== Critical reception ==
Professional ratings
Aggregate scores
Source	Rating
Metacritic	78/100
Review scores
Source	Rating
DIY	4.5/5 stars
The Line of Best Fit	7/10
Mojo	4/5 stars
MusicOMH	4/5 stars
The Observer	4/5 stars
Pitchfork	7.7/10
Record Collector	4/5 stars
The Skinny	3/5 stars
Slant Magazine	3.5/5 stars
Uncut	7/10

Little Rope received a score of 78 out of 100 on review aggregator Metacritic based on 20 critics' reviews, indicating "generally favorable" reception. Kitty Empire of The Observer found it to be "one of Sleater-Kinney's most taut and focused outings, with every crisp guitar line and expressive vocal showcased in textured relief". Uncut wrote that "Sleater-Kinney strike a finer balance between their established punk sound and the New Wave references that gummed up recent records". Mojo felt that the album "carves space for the well-worn mind, offering sharp perspective on moments when everything seems blunted". Jenn Pelley of Pitchfork called it Sleater-Kinney's "sturdiest, catchiest rock record since 2015's hiatus-breaking No Cities to Love and their most somber since 1999's The Hot Rock".

DIY's Elvis Thirlwell remarked that with "none" of the band's "classic late-'90s output diluted by the passage of time, Little Rope sloshes up nothing less than a condensed, rocket-punch collection of ten three-minute bangers". Reviewing the album for The Line of Best Fit, Tom Williams stated that "this is still not the Sleater-Kinney of old, and longtime fans of the band who were previously left wanting by the band's work post-Weiss are unlikely to be entirely won over by Little Rope". He elaborated that "the ultimate sound and energy of Little Rope seems intentional – the duo's departure from their previously established winning formula, a conscious choice rather than a regretful necessity".

John Murphy of MusicOMH described the album as "a huge return to form" and "the sound of a band who have done some recalibrating and are back to doing what they do best", finding there to be "an intensity and focus about the band's 11th album that has been sorely missing on more recent outings". Record Collector called it "a fraught album that reaches out furiously for release, forming a push-pull of pressure and release around the band's defining attributes: Tucker's tumultuous vocals and Brownstein's livid guitar".

Writing for Slant Magazine, Lewie Parkinson-Jones stated that "Weiss's skill as an arranger is still missed here" but "Tucker and Brownstein deserve credit for continuing to take risks and experiment with Sleater-Kinney's established sound, resulting in another solid effort in an unexpectedly fruitful late period". The Skinny's Cheri Amour found Little Rope to be "raw but still leaves us hankering for more", concluding: "Give us the electrifying assault and brutal guitar tones to fill those tiny cracks now present in our hearts. Give us a little more rope."

== Track listing ==
All tracks are written by Carrie Brownstein and Corin Tucker.

Little Rope track listing
No.	Title	Length
1.	"Hell"	3:14
2.	"Needlessly Wild"	2:51
3.	"Say It Like You Mean It"	3:44
4.	"Hunt You Down"	3:32
5.	"Small Finds"	3:07
6.	"Don't Feel Right"	3:50
7.	"Six Mistakes"	3:08
8.	"Crusader"	3:37
9.	"Dress Yourself"	3:28
10.	"Untidy Creature"	3:28
Total length:		33:59

Deluxe edition
No.	Title	Length
11.	"This Time"	3:54
12.	"Here Today"	3:37
13.	"Nothing To Lose"	3:38
14.	"Hell (Live in Melbourne / 2024)"	3:51
15.	"Say It Like You Mean It (Live in Melbourne / 2024)"	3:51
16.	"Needlessly Wild (Live in Melbourne / 2024)"	2:59
17.	"Say It Like You Mean It (Frayed Version)"	3:42
18.	"Hunt You Down (Frayed Version)"	2:56
19.	"Untidy Creature (Frayed Version)"	3:23
Total length:		1:06:33

== Personnel ==
Sleater-Kinney

- Corin Tucker – lead vocals (on "Hell," "Say It Like You Mean It," "Small Finds," "Six Mistakes," and "Untidy Creature"), guitar, background vocals
- Carrie Brownstein – guitar, lead vocals (on "Needlessly Wild," "Hunt You Down," "Don't Feel Right," "Crusader," and "Dress Yourself"), background vocals

Additional musicians

- Angie Boylan – drums, percussion
- Galen Clark – keyboards, synthesizer
- Dave Depper – guitar, keyboards

Production

- John Congleton – production, mixing, engineering
- Bernie Grundman – mastering
- Cole Halvorsen – engineering

== Charts ==
Chart performance for Little Rope
Chart (2024)	Peak position
Scottish Albums (Official Charts)	9
UK Album Downloads (Official Charts)	15
US Top Album Sales (Billboard)	23
