= All Hands on the Bad One =

Studio album by Sleater-Kinney
- Released: May 2, 2000
- Recorded: December 1999 – January 2000
- Studios: Jackpot!, Portland, Oregon; John and Stu's, Seattle, Washington
- Genre: Punk rock
- Length: 37:07
- Label: Kill Rock Stars
- Producer: John Goodmanson

Sleater-Kinney chronology
The Hot Rock (1999)	All Hands on the Bad One (2000)	One Beat (2002)

Singles from All Hands on the Bad One
- 1. "You're No Rock n' Roll Fun" Released: May 2, 2000

All Hands on the Bad One is the fifth studio album by the American rock band Sleater-Kinney, released on May 2, 2000, by Kill Rock Stars. The album was produced by John Goodmanson and recorded from December 1999 to January 2000 at Jackpot! Studio in Portland, Oregon and John & Stu's Place in Seattle, Washington. The music on the record ranges from softer melodies to fast punk rock guitar work, while the lyrics address issues such as women in rock, morality, eating disorders, feminism, music journalism, and media.

Upon release, All Hands on the Bad One reached number 177 on the US Billboard Top 200 chart and number 12 on the Heatseekers Albums chart. One song from the album, "You're No Rock n' Roll Fun", was released as a single. The album received very positive reviews from critics, who praised its consistency and the vocals by singer and guitarist Corin Tucker. All Hands on the Bad One appeared in several end-of-year lists and received a nomination for Outstanding Music Album at the 12th Annual Gay and Lesbian Alliance Against Defamation Awards.

== Background and recording ==
All Hands on the Bad One is the follow-up to Sleater-Kinney's highly acclaimed fourth album The Hot Rock, released in 1999. The Hot Rock marked a considerable change in the band's sound, veering into a more relaxed and gloomy direction than the raucous punk rock style of its predecessors. It was also the first Sleater-Kinney album that entered the US Billboard Top 200 chart, peaking at number 181. Some fans, however, dismissed the album, claiming that the band had sold out and that it was a commercial album. This criticism was something that singer and guitarist Corin Tucker strongly disagreed with, claiming that The Hot Rock was their least commercial album due to its longer and intricate pieces. According to Tucker, "we wanted to be doing difficult work. We wanted to be expanding as musicians and people didn't want that from us. They wanted us to jump around and yell."

After expanding their musical boundaries with The Hot Rock, the band decided not to worry about what their next album was going to sound like. Tucker explained, "It was so spontaneous [...] The songs just kept popping up one after another. We didn't really talk about anything. It just kind of happened." She also said that they wanted to write songs that were "really straightforward but also a bit more mature in their structure and delivery than [their] earlier songs." All Hands on the Bad One is also the first Sleater-Kinney album where drummer Janet Weiss provides backing vocals on some tracks. Tucker remarked that they initially wanted her to sing on The Hot Rock, but the idea was ultimately rejected due to the album's complex melodies. All Hands on the Bad One was produced by John Goodmanson, who previously produced the band's third studio album, Dig Me Out. The band decided to work with him again because, according to Weiss, Goodmanson "has the incredible ability of capturing our live sound and heightening it, so we sound better". The album was recorded from December 1999 to January 2000 at Jackpot! Recording Studio in Portland, Oregon and John & Stu's Place in Seattle, Washington.

== Music and lyrics ==
Similar to other Sleater-Kinney albums, the lyrics of All Hands on the Bad One feature personal, political, and social themes. The first song, "The Ballad of the Ladyman", is a deliberate attempt to mock those who misunderstand the band. Tucker said that the song is "almost making fun of how people see us, how people see what you're supposed to be when you're a woman in rock." The song was inspired when the band was invited to the Bowlie Weekender music festival in England in 1999. Tucker explained, "We were all staying in little chalets or whatever and we had our own cabin and we were cabin 216. Someone wrote this message to us that was like, 'Cabin 216 ladymen.' And we were like, 'What?' It was meant to be a funny thing, but in this other way, it was really this naming of us. It was a subtle way of saying, 'Oh, you're different because you're a woman band and because you're in some ways political.' It's still seen as threatening to people. It's not like we had this weekend where we just relaxed with everyone and just hung out." Kat Iudicello, writing for PopMatters, stated that the song "sports sweet harmonies, a slow anger and soft, low bitterness, and driving steady guitars and drums."

The song "Male Model" targets the male role models for female rock bands, while "Pompeii" explores soul-searching themes such as one's losses and anxieties. "Youth Decay" was described by Iudicello as a song that "grapples with adult disbelief of the problems of youth and the manifestations of it in terms of eating disorders and silence." It features fast punk rock guitar work. The lyrics to "#1 Must-Have" reference images of the riot grrrl scene in the mainstream media. It was written when Tucker was preparing for an interview about the subject, held by the EMP Museum in Olympia, Washington. The song also alludes to the misogyny that took place at the Woodstock '99 music festival, where several women were raped. Similarly, the song "Was It a Lie?" is a protest against how violence is used as entertainment in the media. "The Professional" aims at music journalism and contains heavy drum work, while "Ironclad" features "fuzzed-out riffs and pounding fills". Other songs such as "Leave You Behind" and "The Swimmer" feature soft melodies and harmonies. "You're No Rock n' Roll Fun" was described as "easy moving, beach punk rock music". "Milkshake n' Honey" was considered to be the band's funkiest song. Brent DiCrescenzo of Pitchfork commented that the song "spits wit at expatriates in Paris as Corin rolls her eyes at the type of denizens in The Sun Also Rises."

The song "All Hands on the Bad One" features guitar riffs that are reminiscent of the band's second album, Call the Doctor. It was chosen as the title track because, according to guitarist Carrie Brownstein, it is the song that best represents the sentiment of the album. Brownstein explained that the song deals with "your relationship to evil and your relationship to the hypocrisy of forcing a morality on someone else when you yourself are no better." She added, "'Ballad of the Ladyman', for instance—who is 'the ladyman'? Is the person that wants to be on the radio, 'the bad one,' or is it the fans assuming that they [the artist] want to be on the radio—are they 'the bad one'? Or is 'The Professional,' the ominous professional figure, 'the bad one'? I think all these songs can go into that machine of 'the bad one' and that mentality and then be spit out in a bunch of different scenarios. So that's why I think it works as the title."

== Release ==
All Hands on the Bad One was released on May 2, 2000, by the independent record label Kill Rock Stars, which also released the band's previous two albums. The album cover features a photo of Brownstein being hauled off a dance floor. According to Weiss, "She worked herself into a frenzy and passed out. People are laughing in the background because she's wearing a bunny suit." All Hands on the Bad One reached number 177 on the US Billboard Top 200 chart, #12 on the Heatseekers Albums chart, and #5 on the KEXP Top 90.3 Album Chart for 2000. The band promoted the album with a tour across North America and England, featuring old and new songs. The band also did the set-up and sold merchandise themselves. As of August 2002, the album has sold 73,000 copies in the U.S. according to Nielsen SoundScan. As of February 2015, All Hands on the Bad One has sold 98,000 copies.

The song "You're No Rock n' Roll Fun" was released as a single on the same day as the album, featuring an outtake, "Maraca", as the B-side. In the United Kingdom, the single was released by Matador Records in both vinyl and compact disc formats. The compact disc version includes a third song, "What If I Was Right", which is an outtake from the studio sessions for The Hot Rock that was previously released on Kill Rock Stars' Jackson's Jukebox compilation album. A music video was made for "You're No Rock n' Roll Fun" under the direction of Brett Vapnek, who previously worked on music videos by Helium and Cat Power.

== Critical reception ==
Professional ratings
Aggregate scores
Source	Rating
Metacritic	86/100
Review scores
Source	Rating
AllMusic	4/5 stars
Chicago Sun-Times	4/4 stars
The Guardian	5/5 stars
Melody Maker	4.5/5 stars
NME	8/10
Pitchfork	8.3/10 (2000); 8.5/10 (2014)
Q	4/5 stars
Rolling Stone	3/5 stars
Spin	8/10
The Village Voice	A−

All Hands on the Bad One received very positive reviews from critics. Pitchfork reviewer Brent DiCrescenzo described it as the band's most melodic, playful, sarcastic, and punchy album to date. Kat Iudicello, in her review for PopMatters, said that the album features "lovely harmonies, brilliant drum work, great punk rock guitar riffs, and super-smart lyrics." St. Petersburg Times writer Alan Rittner commented, "Sleater-Kinney's confidence and sense of freedom translate into the most relentless instrumental work of the band's career, with no loss in its peerless songcraft." Some critics also praised the album's consistency. According to Joshua Klein of The A.V. Club, "what makes All Hands On The Bad One so distinctive is Sleater-Kinney's dedication to craft as well as spontaneous passion: Song for song, this could be its best album."

Further praise was given to Tucker's vocals. DiCrescenzo opined that "Corin reveals greater character depth than ever before" while Kitty Empire of NME commented that she "is Siouxsie on 'Youth Decay', a sassy Francophile lover on 'Milkshake n' Honey' and all West Coast beach babe on the immensely pretty 'Leave You Behind'." Steve Huey, writing for AllMusic, gave high marks to Tucker and Brownstein's guitar interplay as well as Weiss' backing vocals, stating that the band "makes full use of that extra instrument, packing the tracks with lilting three-part harmonies." The Southland Times notably praised the album's maturity and assertiveness, commenting that the band "has also created a more melodic sound and tunes are catchier and more accomplished with Tucker's vocals sounding more confident and tuneful than ever." Klein pointed out that "Corin Tucker's Belinda Carlisle vibrato has never sounded better [...], while Carrie Brownstein's straight counterpoint keeps the songs grounded in punk-rock fury."

In a mixed review, Arion Berger of Rolling Stone magazine noted that Sleater-Kinney "have remade rock aggression as thinking-women's work and handled punk with finesse", but also criticized the writing of some tracks for being "awfully self-conscious for a fifth album." The Village Voice reviewer Howard Hampton compared the album's music favorably to The Go-Go's' Beauty and the Beat, even though he remarked that instead of "[settling] for The Go-Go's demure ministrations", All Hands on the Bad One "means to work the whole loving fist all the way up your tight little mind." In a very favorable review, Garry Mulholland of The Guardian concluded that the album "explains exactly why one US mag called [Sleater-Kinney] the best rock'n'roll band in America."

All Hands on the Bad One appeared in several end-of-year lists. Pitchfork placed the record at number 16 in its list of "Top 20 Albums of 2000", commenting "Sleater-Kinney chanced losing some riot [grrrl] cred in favor of writing songs that cover a more diverse spectrum of emotions and themes, and came up their most compelling and political record to date". Toronto Star rated it the eighth best album of the year, Edmonton Journal named it one of the best album of the year, and The Village Voice placed it #10 in its 2000 Pazz & Jop Critics' Poll. All Hands on the Bad One also received a nomination for Outstanding Music Album at the 12th Annual Gay and Lesbian Alliance Against Defamation Awards, but lost to k.d. lang's Invincible Summer.

== Track listing ==
All music is composed by Sleater-Kinney.

No.	Title	Length
1.	"The Ballad of a Ladyman"	3:11
2.	"Ironclad"	2:34
3.	"All Hands on the Bad One"	2:57
4.	"Youth Decay"	2:30
5.	"You're No Rock n' Roll Fun"	2:38
6.	"#1 Must Have"	3:04
7.	"The Professional"	1:31
8.	"Was It a Lie?"	3:16
9.	"Male Model"	2:33
10.	"Leave You Behind"	3:27
11.	"Milkshake n' Honey"	2:55
12.	"Pompeii"	2:43
13.	"The Swimmer"	3:46
Total length:		37:07

== Personnel ==
Credits are adapted from the album's liner notes.

Sleater-Kinney

- Carrie Brownstein – guitar, vocals
- Corin Tucker – vocals, guitar
- Janet Weiss – drums, percussion, vocals

Additional musicians

- Sam Coomes – mellotron on "Milkshake n' Honey"
- Sarah Dougher – organ on "All Hands on the Bad One" and "The Swimmer"

Technical personnel

- Greg Calbi – mastering
- Larry Crane – engineering
- John Goodmanson – production

== Charts ==
Chart performance for All Hands on the Bad One
Chart (2000)	Peak position
UK Independent Albums (Official Charts)	30
US Billboard 200	177
US Heatseekers Albums (Billboard)	12
US Independent Albums (Billboard)	11
