= Corin Tucker =

American musician (born 1972)

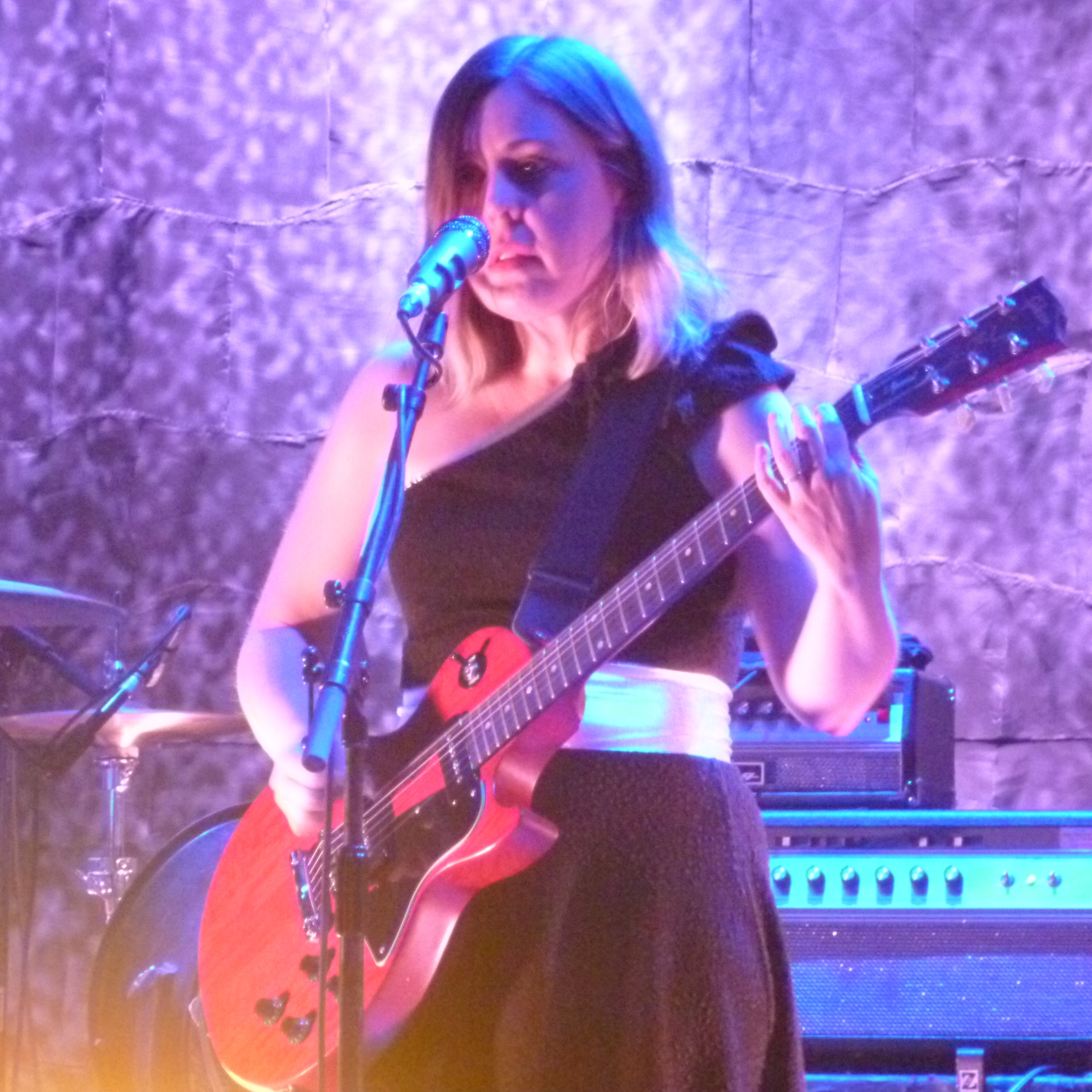
- Tucker performing live with Sleater-Kinney in London, 2015

Background information
- Born: Corin Lisa Tucker; November 9, 1972 (age 53); State College, Pennsylvania, U.S.
- Genres: Punk rock; indie rock; riot grrrl
- Occupations: Singer; musician; songwriter; producer; website developer; filmmaker
- Instruments: Vocals; guitar
- Labels: Kill Rock Stars; Chainsaw; K; Sub Pop

Corin Lisa Tucker (born November 9, 1972) is an American singer, songwriter, and guitarist best known for her work with rock band Sleater-Kinney. Tucker is also a member of the alternative rock supergroup Filthy Friends, and previously recorded with the punk band Heavens to Betsy as well as The Corin Tucker Band.

Entertainment Weekly writes, "Corin Tucker's place in rock history is already set in stone, and her work in the riot grrrl era is pretty much peerless, thanks to the muscular guitar style, otherworldly wail, and knack for punchy, pounding three-minute blasts she brought to such great heights with riot queens Sleater-Kinney." Rolling Stone called her "a punk-rock heroine." In 2023, Rolling Stone ranked Tucker at number 155 on its list of the 200 Greatest Singers of All Time.

== Early life ==
Tucker was born in State College, Pennsylvania, and spent her childhood in Grand Forks, North Dakota. There, her father was a college professor and her mother was a medical technician. Her father is also a folk singer and musician. She began studying piano when she was twelve. In high school in Eugene, Oregon, she was in a band with friends called This That and the Other.

Tucker says she "grew up on the Beatles" but that "her mind was completely blown" when she heard R.E.M.'s album Murmur when she was 11. Her other musical influences include the Soundtrack from The Wizard of Oz, Joan Jett & the Blackhearts' I Love Rock 'N' Roll, The B-52's, Pat Benatar's Get Nervous, Television's Marquee Moon, and Bikini Kill. Her first concert was to see the band X in Eugene around 1987.

In 1990, Tucker attended Evergreen State College in Olympia, Washington, where she studied film, political economy, and social change. She was also exposed to the music scene in Olympia. Tucker said, "I was 18 when I went to a show that Bratmobile and Bikini Kill played. It was February 14, 1991...It was the first time I'd seen feminism translated into an emotional language. For young women to be doing that, basically teenagers on stage, to be taking that kind of stance, that kind of power, was blowing people's minds. And it totally blew my mind. I was like, 'OK, that's it. That's it for me — I'm going in a band, right now.'" The result was the band Heavens to Betsy.

In her first year at Evergreen, Tucker made a documentary about women in music. The documentary included footage of early shows by Bikini Kill and Bratmobile, and interviews with Beat Happening and Nirvana. Tucker graduated from college in 1994.

She says her role models are Maya Angelou, Nora Ephron, and Patti Smith. As Tucker puts its, "Women who have had really long careers and done a lot of different things."

Although she later relocated to Portland, Oregon, Tucker still describes herself as "a small-town girl" from Eugene.

== Career ==
Starting in 1991, Tucker has been a singer, guitarist, and songwriter in several rock bands. In 1999, Esquire wrote that Tucker "has been the most interesting singer in pop music since 1991, when she first opened her mouth in public, in a two-woman drums-and-guitar punk band with the wonderful name of Heavens to Betsy."

Tucker is usually the front person and lead singer. One reviewer noted, "Her voice is enormous, with a natural swing--the sort of swing that neither Tina Turner nor Mick Jagger has ever had, the ability to take a note and ring it like a bell in a tower."

=== Heavens to Betsy ===
Tucker was a founding member of the influential riot grrrl band Heavens to Betsy along with Tracy Sawyer, a longtime friend from Eugene, Oregon. Tucker played the first public show of her career when the band performed at the International Pop Underground Convention in August 1991. Heavens to Betsy recorded a split single with Bratmobile, and several singles for independent record labels. The band released a self-titled demo in 1992, the four-song 7" record These Monsters Are Real in 1992, the album Calculated in 1994, and the 7" four-song Direction in 1994. The band broke up in 1994. Rolling Stone wrote, "Heavens to Betsy [was] one of the standout acts connected to the riot-grrrl movement."

=== Heartless Martin ===
Heartless Martin was Tucker's "one-off collaboration" with Becca Albee of Excuse 17. Heartless Martin released a five-song EP, Tonigh.

=== Sleater-Kinney ===
After Heavens to Betsy split in 1994, Tucker formed Sleater-Kinney with Excuse 17 member Carrie Brownstein and friend Lora McFarlane. Tucker wrote most of the lyrics, sang lead vocals, and played second guitar to Brownstein's lead, with the duo collaborating on music. Janet Weiss eventually replaced McFarlane on drums. In 1999, Esquire said Sleater-Kinney was "the best band in the world." They released seven albums over eleven years before going on hiatus in 2006. On August 12, 2006, the band played what was supposed to be their final show at Crystal Ballroom in Portland. However, the band reunited and recorded No Cities to Love in 2015, followed by The Center Won't Hold in 2019, Path of Wellness in 2021 and Little Rope in 2024.

=== Cadallaca ===
While in Sleater-Kinney, Tucker worked on a side project, Cadallaca, with organist Sarah Dougher and drummer STS of The Lookers. In 1998, Cadallaca released their first album Introducing Cadallaca. They released an EP, Out West, on Kill Rock Stars in 2000.

=== The Corin Tucker Band ===
In April 2010, Tucker announced she was recording a solo album for Kill Rock Stars. Unwound's Sara Lund and Golden Bear's' Circus Lupus and Seth Lorinczi assisted Tucker with this project which was dubbed The Corin Tucker Band. The album 1,000 Years was released on October 5, 2010, and was streamed via NPR. The album's eleven songs were different from other Tucker projects—many of the songs were slower folk and Americana, and Tucker played acoustic guitar. Tucker said the album is "definitely more of a middle-aged mom record, in a way. It's not a record that a young person would write... There's some sadness, some reinvention, some rebirth." She cited post-punk acts like the English Beat, The Raincoats, The Slits, and Sinead O'Connor's The Lion and the Cobra as influences for 1,000 Years.

Most reviews of the album were positive. Rolling Stone wrote, "She's not shredding the awesome vocal cords so much, but she gets fierce in other ways, trying on cellos and piano ballads. When she finally cranks it up Sleater-Kinney-style on 'Doubt,' it feels earned: a cry of self-determination, as inspiring as ever." Pitchfork said, "This album's strengths—its intimacy, its containment, its subtlety—are not the qualities that made Sleater-Kinney great, but it would be ungenerous to dismiss this because it's not as thrilling, confrontational, or exuberant." However, an Entertainment Weekly reviewer wrote that the album's songs "sound scrapbooked from other '90s-centric acts (Liz Phair, Pavement) but never take on a form of their own." The band toured on both U.S. coasts to support 1,000 Years, in addition to a few festival dates in other parts of the country.

The Corin Tucker Band's second album, Kill My Blues, was released on September 18, 2012, and contained twelve songs. In an interview, Tucker said, "For this record, we really bonded, the four of us, being on tour and playing music together, so in writing this record, we all worked together in the practice space, writing these songs and just enjoying the writing process and everything that came out of it." The resulting songs cover "the finite nature of existence, the stalemate of our political climate, a moment in the transition from girlhood to womanhood...[and] love of different kinds." This album also sounded more like a Sleater-Kinney album than 1,000 Years. One reviewer wrote, "This album harks somewhat to the glory days of the Riot Grrrl Olympia scene of the late '90s, but it's by no means retrospective or reactionary." However, another reviewer correctly predicted Kill My Blues "will inevitably go down as one of the most underrated albums of the year." This album was also supported by a nationwide tour.

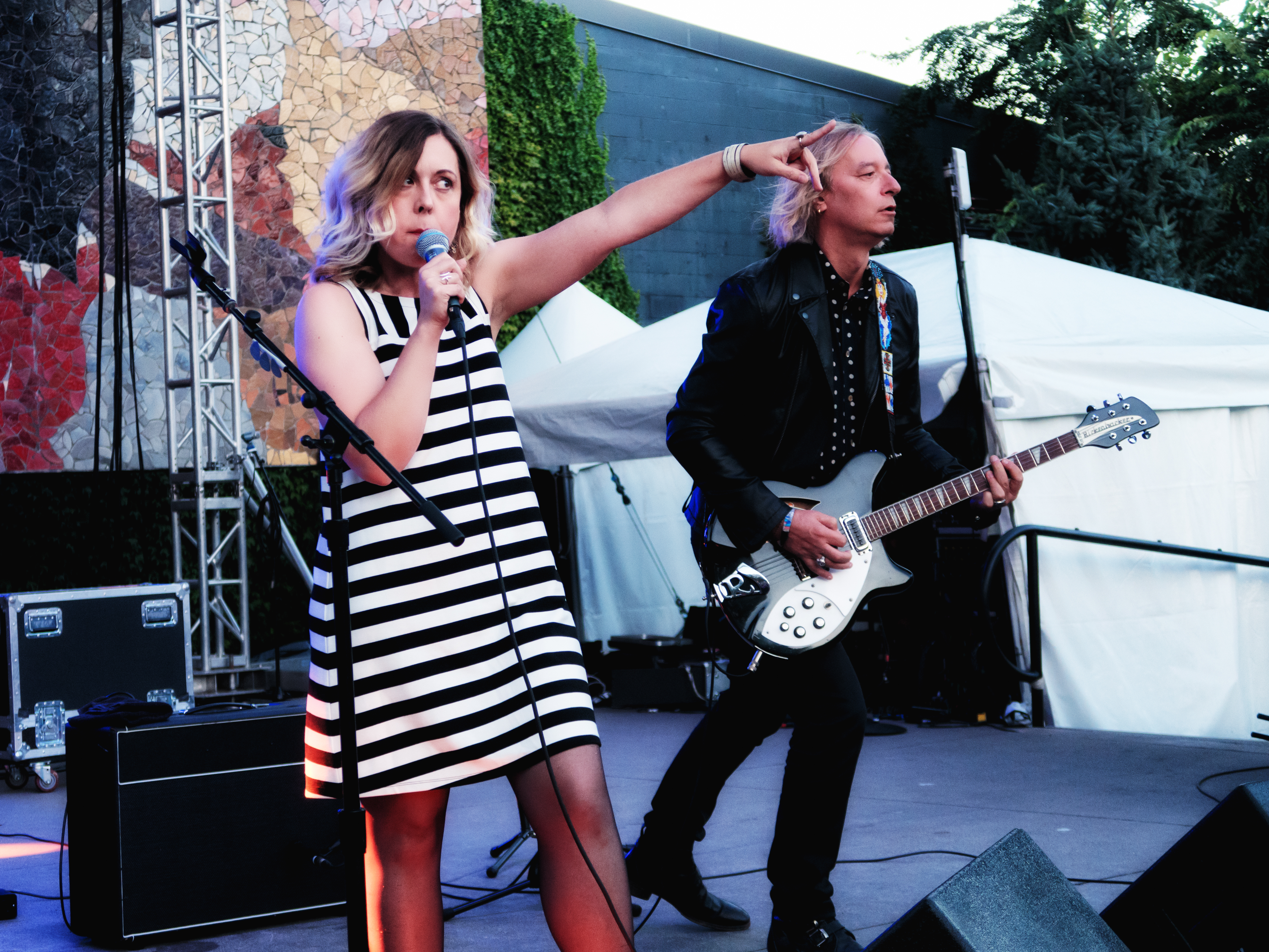
Filthy Friends (Tucker and Buck), 2017

=== Filthy Friends ===
Alt-rock "supergroup" Filthy Friends is another side project for Tucker, with Tucker on lead vocals and R.E.M.'s Peter Buck on guitar, along with other musician friends rounding out the band. The two met when Tucker's husband worked on a film project with R.E.M. Formed in 2014, Filthy Friends has released two albums: Invitation (2017) and Emerald Valley (2019). On both albums, Tucker wrote the majority of the lyrics to match Buck's music.

On Emerald Valley, she played Buck's Fender Musicmaster guitar. Tucker said, "It's a smaller-sized Fender guitar, and I love it. It's really different, and it makes me play differently in this band, because I usually play a Gibson Les Paul and I'm usually a rhythm guitar player, almost a bass player, in Sleater-Kinney."

=== Other projects ===
Tucker has worked on a variety of other musical projects. She sang back-up vocals on two of Peter Buck's solo albums, including Peter Buck (2012). She sang a duet with Eddie Vedder of Pearl Jam for the title track of John Doe's EP The Golden State in 2008. She also provided vocals for the song "Hard Sun" on Vedder's soundtrack for the 2007 film Into the Wild. In 2018, she covered the title track "Shine On", for the album released by The Jim Henson Company as part of the Fraggle Rock's 30th anniversary celebration.

Tucker has also dabbled in television and film. She appeared in two episodes of bandmate Carrie Brownstein's television show Portlandia, portraying a member of the fictional band Echo Echo. In addition, Portlandia was first filmed at Tucker's house and she was the camera crew.

Tucker is in the following films portraying herself: The Punk Singer (2013), Burn to Shine 03: Portland, OR (2006), and Don't Need You: The Herstory of Riot Grrrl (2005), as well as an episode of the television show The L Word (2006) and the web series Sound Advice (2015).

== Personal life ==
Tucker previously identified as a lesbian, but now identifies as bisexual. She came out to her family when she was 19 years old. She briefly dated bandmate Carrie Brownstein at the beginning of Sleater-Kinney in May 1994, a fact that was revealed to the world in a Spin article. Tucker called the article a "pain in the ass." She said, "We weren't asked about our personal lives in the interview. We talked about things we thought were really important, and what they printed was that we dated. It just came out as being gossip." Tucker wrote the Sleater-Kinney song "One More Hour" about her breakup with Brownstein.

Tucker has been outspoken in her support of the pro-choice movement. An ardent feminist, she believes it is more important than ever for women to fight for equality. She also spoke against the Iraq War. In her songs with Filthy Friends, she has protested deforestation, U.S. Immigration and Customs Enforcement, and oil pipelines.

She got her only tattoo when she was 18 — the name "Heavens to Betsy" in cursive with a star on either side, on her ankle.

Tucker married filmmaker Lance Bangs in June 2000 in Iceland. They have a son and a daughter.

In 2012, she was also working in web development and interactive media for a health care company, where she also produced training and informational videos.

== Gear list ==
=== With Sleater-Kinney (2018) ===
==== Guitar ====
- Danelectro U-2
- Danelectro DC-59
- 1960s Gibson SG Junior
- Gibson Les Paul Specials

==== Pedal ====
- Bass Micro Synthesizer by Electro-Harmonix

==== Effects ====
- Boss GE-7 Graphic EQ
- Eventide Mod Factor

==== Amplifier ====
- Fender Pro Junior
- Orange
- Fender Twin Reverb
- Ampeg

=== With Filthy Friends (2019) ===
==== Amplifier ====
- Fender Deluxe Reverb
- Fender Twin

Guitars

- Fender Musicmaster guitar

Effects

- Catalinbread 5F6 Formula distortion pedal

Microphone

- Neumann

== Discography ==
=== Heartless Martin ===
- Tonigh (1993)

=== Heavens to Betsy ===
- Heavens to Betsy (1992)
- Calculated (1994)

=== Sleater-Kinney ===
- Sleater-Kinney (1995)
- Call the Doctor (1996)
- Dig Me Out (1997)
- The Hot Rock (1999)
- All Hands on the Bad One (2000)
- One Beat (2002)
- The Woods (2005)
- No Cities to Love (2015)
- The Center Won't Hold (2019)
- Path of Wellness (2021)
- Little Rope (2024)

=== Cadallaca ===
- Introducing Cadallaca (1998)
- Out West, EP (1999)

=== The Corin Tucker Band ===
- 1,000 Years (2010)
- Kill My Blues (2012)

=== Filthy Friends ===
- Invitation (2017)
- Emerald Valley (2019)

== See also ==
- List of LGBT people from Portland, Oregon
