= The Center Won't Hold =

Studio album by Sleater-Kinney
- Released: August 16, 2019
- Recorded: 2018–2019
- Studio: Hafling Studios (Portland, Oregon)
- Genre: Punk rock; post-punk; industrial rock; synth-pop
- Length: 36:16
- Label: Mom + Pop
- Producer: St. Vincent

Sleater-Kinney chronology
No Cities to Love (2015)	The Center Won't Hold (2019)	Path of Wellness (2021)

Singles from The Center Won't Hold
- 1. "Hurry on Home" Released: May 29, 2019; 2. "Can I Go On" Released: August 5, 2019

The Center Won't Hold is the ninth studio album by American rock band Sleater-Kinney, released on August 16, 2019 by Mom + Pop Music. The album was produced by St. Vincent and is the last album with drummer Janet Weiss, who announced her departure from the band on July 1, 2019, a month before the album was released, and the last album to date featured as a trio. Upon release, the album received generally favorable reviews from critics.

== Recording and release ==
By January 2018, the band was said to be working on their follow-up to No Cities to Love, though Carrie Brownstein has said that they're "going to do this very slowly". Carrie Brownstein suggested to Jeff Tweedy that he produce some songs with the band but they began working with St. Vincent first and they enjoyed working with her so much that they decided to continue with her. In January 2019, the band announced that a new album would be expected the same year, produced by St. Vincent.

== Singles ==
"Hurry On Home" was released as the album's lead single on May 29, 2019. The band performed the song on The Tonight Show Starring Jimmy Fallon on June 19, 2019. "Can I Go On" serves as the second single, impacting Triple A radio on August 5, 2019. A promotional single, "The Future Is Here", was released on June 14, 2019. The title track was released as the second promotional single on July 17, 2019.

== Composition ==
With The Center, Sleater-Kinney was credited with adding the explicit "artiness" of post-punk "to their punk roar." It is also seen as a "sleek [and] sharp" fusion of industrial music and synth-pop.

According to Janet Weiss, Corin Tucker and Carrie Brownstein made it clear during the making of the album that Weiss would no longer be a creative equal in the band and would just serve as the band's drummer. Upon completion of recording, Weiss felt reluctant to perform the album's songs live due to her lack of involvement in the creation process and opted to leave the band prior to the album's release.

== Critical reception ==
Professional ratings
Aggregate scores
Source	Rating
AnyDecentMusic?	7.7/10
Metacritic	80/100
Review scores
Source	Rating
AllMusic	3.5/5 stars
The A.V. Club	A
The Guardian	4/5 stars
The Independent	4/5 stars
NME	4/5 stars
The Observer	3/5 stars
Pitchfork	7.9/10
Q	4/5 stars
Rolling Stone	4/5 stars
Uncut	8/10

According to the review aggregator Metacritic, The Center Won't Hold received "generally favorable reviews" based on a weighted average score of 80 out of 100 from 30 critic scores. The A.V. Club included "Hurry On Home" as part of its list of the 30 best queer rock tracks of 2019 and reviewer Katie Rife gave it a positive assessment, writing: "Sleek and shredded, the song bears the stamp of producer St. Vincent, whose slinky sexiness collides with Sleater-Kinney’s heavy riffage with all the power—and entertainment value—of Godzilla battling King Kong."

Upon the album's release, Rife praised the relevance of the songwriting and St. Vincent's production. Comparing The Center Won't Hold to the band's previous albums, The Fader called the album a "beastlier-sounding record than any of those, with wide-open expanses full of slime and bile and some of the band’s most vicious lyrics, blown up to occupy every part of the mix". In Uncut, Sharon O'Connell called it "furiously, vitally Sleater-Kinney". Caryn Rose, writing for Pitchfork, described the production as standing out from the rest of the band's discography, but still keeping the elements they are known for. While ambivalent about St. Vincent's "polished" arty production, Robert Christgau gave the album an A-minus and observed a hooky "musical efficiency" throughout, along with allusive political content "from its Yeatsian opener to a closer that invokes both #MeToo and Hillary '16 if you want it to".

Kate Hutchinson of The Observer was less positive, suggesting that Sleater-Kinney is trying too hard, when they "have always felt effortless". Writing for Tiny Mix Tapes, Jeremy Klein gave a mixed review, with a score of three out of five, calling the collaboration with St. Vincent ultimately disappointing and calling the band "lost" while giving a positive reception to several tracks.

== Track listing ==
All tracks are written by Sleater-Kinney.

No.	Title	Length
1.	"The Center Won't Hold"	3:04
2.	"Hurry On Home"	2:48
3.	"Reach Out"	3:30
4.	"Can I Go On"	3:30
5.	"Restless"	2:41
6.	"Ruins"	5:18
7.	"Love"	2:16
8.	"Bad Dance"	2:45
9.	"The Future Is Here"	3:00
10.	"The Dog/The Body"	4:22
11.	"Broken"	3:02
Total length:		36:16

== Personnel ==
Sleater-Kinney

- Carrie Brownstein – guitar, vocals, piano on "Broken"
- Corin Tucker – guitar, vocals
- Janet Weiss – drums

Technical personnel

- Tom Elmhirst – mixing
- Cian Riordan – engineering
- St. Vincent – production

Artwork

- Clare Byrne – styling
- Charlie Engman – photography
- Humberto Leon – creative direction
- João Moraes/Framework – art direction
- Tina Outen – hair
- Brian Phillips – creative direction
- Kanako Takase – makeup
- McLayne Ycmat – design

== Charts ==
=== Album ===
Chart performance for The Center Won't Hold
Chart (2019)	Peak position
Australian Albums (ARIA)	34
Belgian Albums (Ultratop Wallonia)	147
German Albums (Offizielle Top 100)	73
Scottish Albums (OCC)	9
Spanish Albums (Promusicae)	64
Swiss Albums (Schweizer Hitparade)	83
UK Albums (OCC)	45
US Billboard 200	27
US Top Alternative Albums (Billboard)	2
US Top Rock Albums (Billboard)	4

=== Singles ===
Singles chart performance
Year	Single	Peak
Year	Single	US Triple A Songs
2019	"Hurry On Home"	35
2019	"Can I Go On"	24
