= Path of Wellness =

Studio album by Sleater-Kinney
- Released: June 11, 2021
- Recorded: 2020–2021
- Studios: Hafling Studios (Portland, Oregon)
- Genre: Punk rock
- Length: 38:57
- Label: Mom + Pop
- Producer: Sleater-Kinney

Sleater-Kinney chronology
The Center Won't Hold (2019)	Path of Wellness (2021)	Little Rope (2024)

Singles from Path of Wellness
- 1. "Worry with You" Released: May 11, 2021; 2. "High in the Grass" Released: May 26, 2021; 3. "Method" Released: June 9, 2021

Path of Wellness is the tenth studio album by the American rock band Sleater-Kinney. The album was released on June 11, 2021, by Mom + Pop Music. This is the band's first album since 1996's Call the Doctor to not feature their long-time drummer Janet Weiss, and their first album as a duo.

== Release and promotion ==
On May 11, 2021, Sleater-Kinney announced the album title, cover art, and release date for Path of Wellness, and promised their fans "so much more, soon". Accompanying the album announcement was the release of Path of Wellness's lead single and music video, "Worry With You". The video, directed by Alberta Poon, features a young couple, played by Fabi Reyna and Megan Watson, attempting to cohabitate in their undersized house. Tucker and Brownstein make cameo appearances as an actor in a pharmaceutical commercial and as a television fitness instructor, respectively. On May 26, the band released their follow-up single and video to "Worry With You", titled "High in the Grass". Directed by Kelly Sears, the video for "High in the Grass" provides a psychedelic element, with trees with eyes and a number of decapitated figures, both dancing and attempting cardiopulmonary resuscitation, before culminating in a dance party. The final single to be released in advance of Path of Wellness was "Method", which came out on June 9. The song was accompanied by a Lance Bangs-directed lyric video.

To accompany the June 11 release of Path of Wellness, Sleater-Kinney announced a variety show-style livestream on Amazon Music's Twitch channel, beginning at 9 p.m. (ET) on June 10. Hosted by Chris Hewett, the livestream featured "interviews, live performances and a fortune teller weighing in on [the band's] future prospects", as well as a variety of guest appearances from celebrities and musicians such as Nick Offerman, Megan Mullally, and Matt Berninger from the National. On June 25, Sleater-Kinney released a live extended play titled Live At The Hallowed Halls, featuring recordings of the four tracks on Path of Wellness that they played during the livestream event. Sleater-Kinney promoted Path of Wellness with two other live and recorded events. On June 16, Sleater-Kinney appeared on The Late Show with Stephen Colbert to perform "Worry With You". Rather than playing in front of a live studio audience, the band submitted a pre-taped performance from an abandoned skate park. The next day, Tucker and Brownstein appeared on the Audible service Words + Music to discuss "30 years of shared history making music and making noise".

== Critical reception ==
Professional ratings
Aggregate scores
Source	Rating
AnyDecentMusic?	7.1/10
Metacritic	78/100
Review scores
Source	Rating
The A.V. Club	B
Beats Per Minute	58%
Clash	7/10
Entertainment Weekly	B+
Exclaim!	8/10
NME	3/5 stars
Paste	7.3/10
Pitchfork	6.8/10
Rolling Stone	4/5 stars
Under the Radar	7.5/10 stars

Path of Wellness was met with mostly positive reviews from music critics. At Metacritic, which assigns a normalized rating out of 100 to reviews from mainstream critics, Path of Wellness has an average score of 78 based on 18 reviews. The review aggregator AnyDecentMusic? gave the album 7.1 out of 10, based on their assessment of the critical consensus.

== Track listing ==
All tracks are written by Carrie Brownstein and Corin Tucker.

No.	Title	Length
1.	"Path of Wellness"	2:40
2.	"High in the Grass"	4:05
3.	"Worry with You"	3:50
4.	"Method"	4:20
5.	"Shadow Town"	5:10
6.	"Favorite Neighbor"	2:49
7.	"Tomorrow's Grave"	3:52
8.	"No Knives"	1:16
9.	"Complex Female Characters"	3:00
10.	"Down the Line"	4:06
11.	"Bring Mercy"	3:49
Total length:		38:57

== Personnel ==
Credits are adapted from the album's liner notes.

Sleater-Kinney

- Carrie Brownstein – guitar, vocals, keyboards, production
- Corin Tucker – vocals, guitar, production

Additional musicians

- Bill Athens – bass
- Angie Boylan – drums on "Favorite Neighbor" and "Tomorrow's Grave"
- Katie Harkin – background vocals on "Down the Line"
- Brian Koch – drums on "High in the Grass," "Method," and "Shadow Town"
- Vince LiRocchi – drums and percussion on all tracks except "High in the Grass," "Method," "Shadow Town," and "No Knives"

Technical

- Adam Lee – engineering
- John Goodmanson – additional vocal engineering
- Tom Elmhirst – mixing on "Path of Wellness," "Shadow Town," "Tomorrow's Grave," "No Knives," and "Down the Line"
- Matt Scatchell – engineering for mix
- Cian Riordan – mixing on all tracks except "Path of Wellness," "Shadow Town," "Tomorrow's Grave," "No Knives," and "Down the Line"
- Peter Labberton – mixing assistance

Artwork

- Samantha Wall – original cover art
- Karen Murphy – photos, design

== Charts ==
Chart performance for Path of Wellness
Chart (2021)	Peak position
Scottish Albums (Official Charts)	22
UK Independent Albums (Official Charts)	14
US Top Album Sales (Billboard)	46
