= The Woods (album) =

Studio album by Sleater-Kinney
- Released: May 24, 2005
- Recorded: November–December 2004
- Studios: Tarbox Road Studios, Cassadaga, New York
- Genre: Alternative rock
- Length: 48:03
- Label: Sub Pop
- Producer: Dave Fridmann

Sleater-Kinney chronology
One Beat (2002)	The Woods (2005)	Start Together (2014)

Singles from The Woods
- 1. "Entertain" Released: May 10, 2005; 2. "Jumpers" Released: September 12, 2005

The Woods is the seventh studio album by American rock band Sleater-Kinney. It was released in 2005 on Sub Pop. The album was produced by Dave Fridmann and recorded in late 2004. The album received widespread critical acclaim.

== Recording and production ==
The Woods was produced by Dave Fridmann and recorded from November-December 2004 at Tarbox Road Studios in Cassadaga, New York. Much of the album was recorded live in the studio, as Fridmann consciously attempted to approximate the band's live sound on the record. The vocals and some of the guitar tracks were the only overdubs. The final two tracks, "Let's Call It Love" and "Night Light," were separate tracks on record but were actually recorded together in a single 15-minute take, after Carrie Brownstein realized that the two tracks were in the same key and could segue into one another.

== Release ==
The Woods was released on May 24, 2005, by Sub Pop, making it the band's first release on that label. Two songs from the album, "Entertain" and "Jumpers", were released as singles on May 10, 2005, and September 12, 2005, respectively. The album reached number 80 on the US Billboard Top 200 chart and number 2 on the Independent Albums chart. As of October 2005, The Woods had sold 59,000 copies in the U.S. according to Nielsen SoundScan. As of February 2015, The Woods had sold 94,000 copies.

== Composition ==
Musically, The Woods is an alternative rock album that takes on "steaming [and] swaggering" hard rock and noise pop with an arena rock sound.

== Critical reception ==
Professional ratings
Aggregate scores
Source	Rating
Metacritic	88/100
Review scores
Source	Rating
AllMusic	4.5/5 stars
Blender	4/5 stars
Entertainment Weekly	A−
The Guardian	4/5 stars
Mojo	5/5 stars
NME	8/10
Pitchfork	9.0/10 (2005); 9.4/10 (2014)
Rolling Stone	4/5 stars
Uncut	4/5 stars
The Village Voice	A

The Woods received widespread critical acclaim. Kyle Ryan, writing for The A.V. Club, described the album as "a quasi-psychedelic, classic-rock-sounding epic", while Keith Harris of The Village Voice praised Corin Tucker's vocals. Less positively, Q awarded the album two stars out of five, finding it "disappointing" when compared to their earlier work.

The Woods appeared at number four in The Village Voice's Pazz & Jop critics' poll for 2005. Pitchfork placed it at number 127 on its list of "The Top 200 Albums of the 2000s". Similarly, Rolling Stone ranked The Woods at number 72 on its list of "100 Best Albums of the 2000s", and Tiny Mix Tapes placed it at number 89 on its list of "Favorite 100 Albums of the 2000s".

== Track listing ==
All songs written by Sleater-Kinney.

No.	Title	Length
1.	"The Fox"	3:25
2.	"Wilderness"	3:40
3.	"What's Mine Is Yours"	4:58
4.	"Jumpers"	4:24
5.	"Modern Girl"	3:01
6.	"Entertain"	4:55
7.	"Rollercoaster"	4:55
8.	"Steep Air"	4:04
9.	"Let's Call It Love"	11:01
10.	"Night Light"	3:40

== Personnel ==
- Carrie Brownstein – guitar, vocals
- Corin Tucker – vocals, guitar
- Janet Weiss – drums, harmonica, backing vocals

Technical

- Dave Fridmann – production, recording, mixing
- Greg Calbi – mastering
- Jeff Kleinsmith – sleeve design
- Michael Brophy – album cover painting
- John Clark – sleeve photography
