= Sleater-Kinney =

American rock band

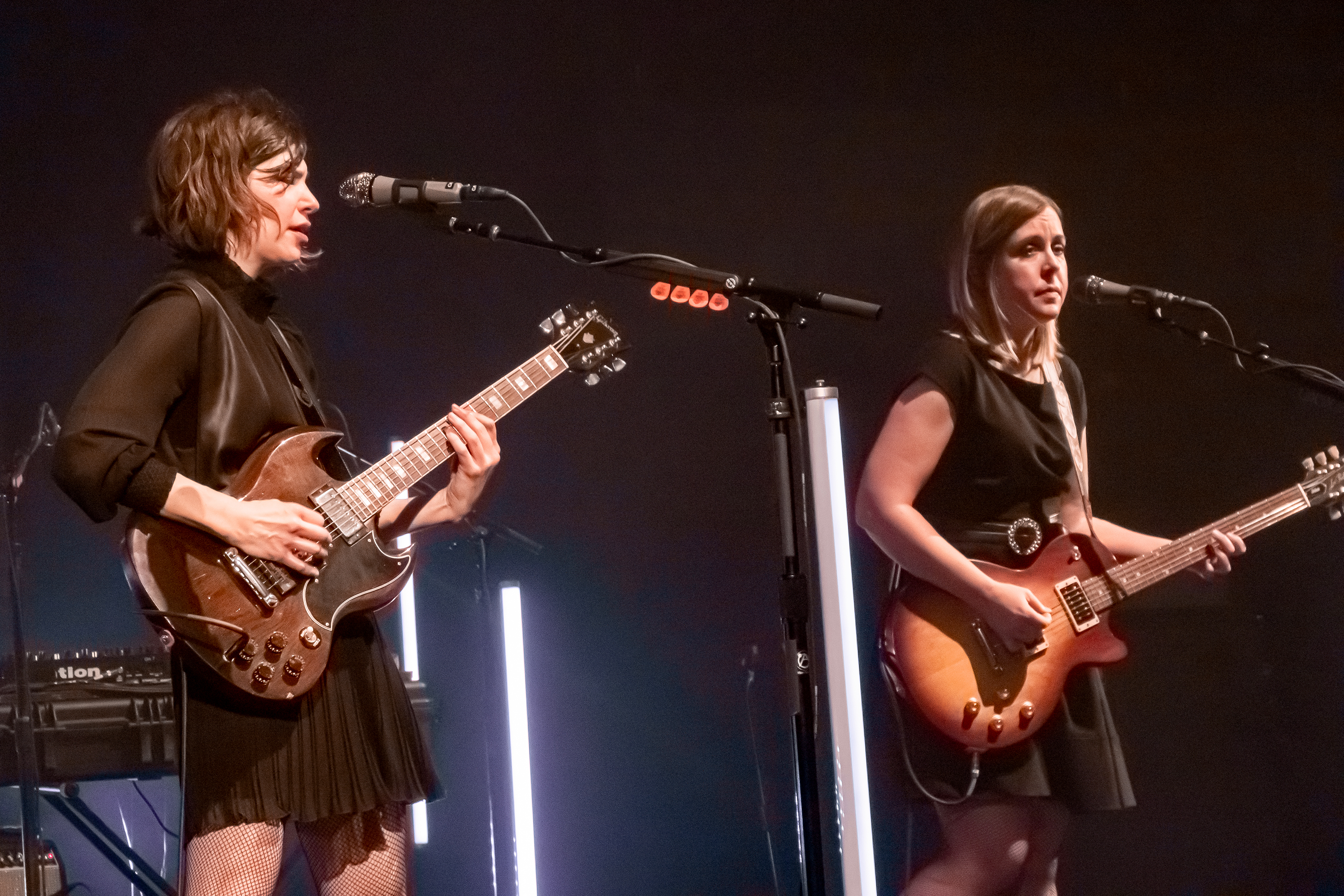
- Sleater-Kinney performing in 2019. L–R: Brownstein, Tucker

Background information
- Origin: Olympia, Washington, U.S.
- Genres: Punk rock; indie rock; riot grrrl; alternative rock
- Years active: 1994–2006; 2014–present
- Labels: Loma Vista; Mom + Pop; Chainsaw; Kill Rock Stars; Sub Pop
- Spinoffs: Wild Flag; Filthy Friends; Cadallaca; Corin Tucker Band
- Spinoff of: Heavens to Betsy; Excuse 17
- Members: Carrie Brownstein; Corin Tucker
- Past members: Janet Weiss; Lora MacFarlane; Toni Gogin; Misty Farrell
- Website: sleater-kinney.com

Sleater-Kinney (/ˌsleɪtərˈkɪniː/ SLAY-tər-KIN-ee) is an American rock band that formed in Olympia, Washington, in 1994. The band's lineup features Corin Tucker (vocals and guitar) and Carrie Brownstein (guitar and vocals), following the departure of longtime member Janet Weiss (drums, harmonica, and vocals) in 2019. Sleater-Kinney originated as part of the riot grrrl movement and has become a key part of the American indie rock scene. The band is also known for its feminist and progressive politics.

The band released seven studio albums between 1994 and 2005: Sleater-Kinney (1995), Call the Doctor (1996), Dig Me Out (1997), The Hot Rock (1999), All Hands on the Bad One (2000), One Beat (2002) and The Woods (2005). They disbanded in 2006 and devoted themselves to solo projects. They reunited in 2014 and have since released a further four albums: No Cities to Love (2015), The Center Won't Hold (2019), Path of Wellness (2021), and Little Rope (2024).

Critics Greil Marcus and Robert Christgau have each praised Sleater-Kinney as one of the essential rock groups of the early 2000s. Marcus named Sleater-Kinney America's best rock band in 2001, and Tom Breihan of Stereogum called them the greatest rock band of the past two decades in 2015.

== History ==
=== Formation, early years (1994–1999) ===
Sleater-Kinney was formed in early 1994 in Olympia, Washington, by Corin Tucker and Carrie Brownstein. The group's name derives from Sleater Kinney Road, in Lacey, Washington, where signs for the Interstate 5 highway exit number 108 announce its existence. The road itself is named for two families that lived in the nearby South Bay neighborhood of Olympia in the 19th century, the Sleaters and Henry and Martha Kinney. One of the band's early practice spaces was near Sleater Kinney Road. Tucker was formerly in the influential riot grrrl band Heavens to Betsy, while Brownstein was formerly in the band Excuse 17. They often played at gigs together and formed Sleater-Kinney as a side project from their respective bands. When Heavens to Betsy and Excuse 17 disbanded, Sleater-Kinney became their primary focus. Janet Weiss of Quasi was the band's longest-lasting drummer, though Sleater-Kinney has had other drummers, including Lora MacFarlane, Misty Farrell, and Toni Gogin.

Upon Tucker's graduation from The Evergreen State College (where Brownstein remained a student for three more years), she and her then-girlfriend Brownstein took a trip to Australia in early 1994. On their last day there, they stayed up all night recording what would become their self-titled debut album. It was released the following spring. They followed this with Call the Doctor (1996) and Dig Me Out (1997), and became critical darlings as a result. Produced by John Goodmanson and recorded at John and Stu's Place in Seattle, the record was influenced by both classic rock 'n' roll and the band's usual punk predecessors. From Dig Me Out onwards, the band's drummer was Janet Weiss.

=== Later albums (2000–2006) ===
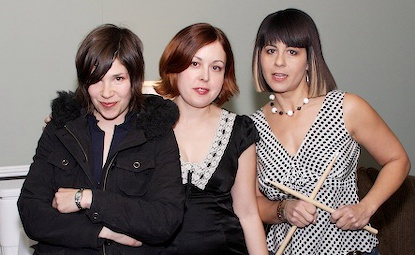
Sleater-Kinney backstage at South by Southwest in 2006

Their next few albums (The Hot Rock, All Hands on the Bad One) pushed the band towards mainstream listeners, culminating in 2002's One Beat. The group opened for Pearl Jam at many North American shows beginning in 2003, and the band cited the experience of playing in large arenas as part of the inspiration and motivation for the music found on their seventh album, The Woods. The Woods was released in 2005 and was a departure from the sound of their previous albums. In its place, The Woods featured a denser, heavily distorted sound that drew on classic rock as its inspiration. In 2006, they helped to curate an edition of the British All Tomorrow's Parties festival. They also contributed to the Burn to Shine project, appearing in Volume 3 (Portland), playing "Modern Girl".

Two days before Sleater-Kinney were to go to Europe for a touring leg there in 2006, Brownstein developed shingles, caused by her anxiety. As Weiss had never caught chicken pox as a child, Brownstein was isolated from the rest of the band, causing her mental health to decline further. Consequently, prior to Sleater-Kinney's performance at Le Botanique in Brussels on May 27, 2006, Brownstein experienced a mental breakdown in front of Tucker and Weiss that prompted her to break up the band. Also contributing to Sleater-Kinney's disbandment was Tucker's exhaustion with touring and her desire to be with her family and look after her child.

On June 27, 2006, the band announced an indefinite hiatus, stating there were "no plans for future tours or recordings." Sleater-Kinney's last major public show was at the 2006 Lollapalooza music festival. The band's final appearance before the hiatus was at the Crystal Ballroom in Portland, Oregon on August 12, 2006. At the time, the band did not offer an explanation for the hiatus, although Brownstein later disclosed the reasons for the breakup in her 2015 memoir Hunger Makes Me a Modern Girl.

=== Hiatus (2007–2013) ===
Upon the dissolution of Sleater-Kinney in 2006, Weiss joined Quasi bandmate Joanna Bolme in Stephen Malkmus and the Jicks. She performed on two albums, Real Emotional Trash in 2008 and the 2011 release Mirror Traffic. She left the band before the tour for the latter. In April 2010, Tucker announced she was recording a solo album for the Kill Rock Stars record label to be released in October 2010. Working with Tucker on the Corin Tucker Band's album was Unwound's Sara Lund and Golden Bears'/Circus Lupus Seth Lorinczi. According to Tucker, the album would be a "middle-aged mom record". The album, entitled 1,000 Years was released on October 5, 2010, to positive reception by music critics. Tucker toured the United States to support the 1,000 Years album. The band's second album, Kill My Blues, was released on September 18, 2012. A United States tour supported this album.

In September 2010, Brownstein revealed her latest project was the band Wild Flag, with Janet Weiss, Mary Timony, formerly of Helium, and Rebecca Cole, formerly of the Minders. Their self-titled eponymous debut album was released on September 13, 2011, on Merge Records. By 2014, the band was no longer active. In an interview, Brownstein stated, "We had a fun run… but all the logistics started seeming not quite worth it." Brownstein's television project Portlandia premiered on IFC in January 2011 and aired a new season every year until its series finale in March 2018.

=== Reunion, new albums, and Weiss's departure (2014–present) ===
In October 2014, the band announced it had recorded a new album, No Cities to Love, later released on January 20, 2015. The members of Sleater-Kinney also announced a 2015 tour covering North America and western Europe. In 2014, the band released the vinyl box set of their previous releases as Start Together. It was reviewed by Bust magazine, where writer Claire McKinzie stated, "With their feminist, left-leaning lyrics, Sleater-Kinney's relevance today is obvious. While some singers back away from being labeled 'feminist,' Sleater-Kinney exists partially to redirect society's perception of the word."

In January 2017, the band released their first live album, Live in Paris, recorded at La Cigale on March 20, 2015. By January 2018, the band was said to be working on their follow-up to No Cities to Love, though Brownstein said that they were "going to do this very slowly." In January 2019, the band announced that a new album, produced by the artist St. Vincent (Annie Clark), was expected that year.

In May 2019, Sleater-Kinney released a new song, "Hurry on Home" along with a lyric video. This served as the lead single for The Center Won't Hold, released in August 2019. During the making of the album, Tucker and Brownstein made it clear to Weiss that she would no longer be a creative equal in the band and would just serve as the band's drummer. Upon completion of recording, Weiss felt reluctant to perform the album's songs live due to her lack of involvement in the creative process and opted to leave the band prior to the album's release.

On July 1, 2019, Weiss announced on her Twitter account that she would be leaving the band, saying it was "time for me to move on". The band performed their first concert without Weiss at the Hopscotch Music Festival on September 5, with new drummer Angie Boylan.

In May 2021, the band announced a new album, Path of Wellness, released on June 11. The first single, "Worry With You" was released on May 11, 2021.

On January 19, 2024, their eleventh studio album, Little Rope, produced by John Congleton, was released on Loma Vista Recordings. The album's lead single, "Hell" was released in conjunction with a music video on October 3, 2023. They announced a deluxe version of the same album and released the outtake "Here Today" on September 3, 2024.

== Musical style ==
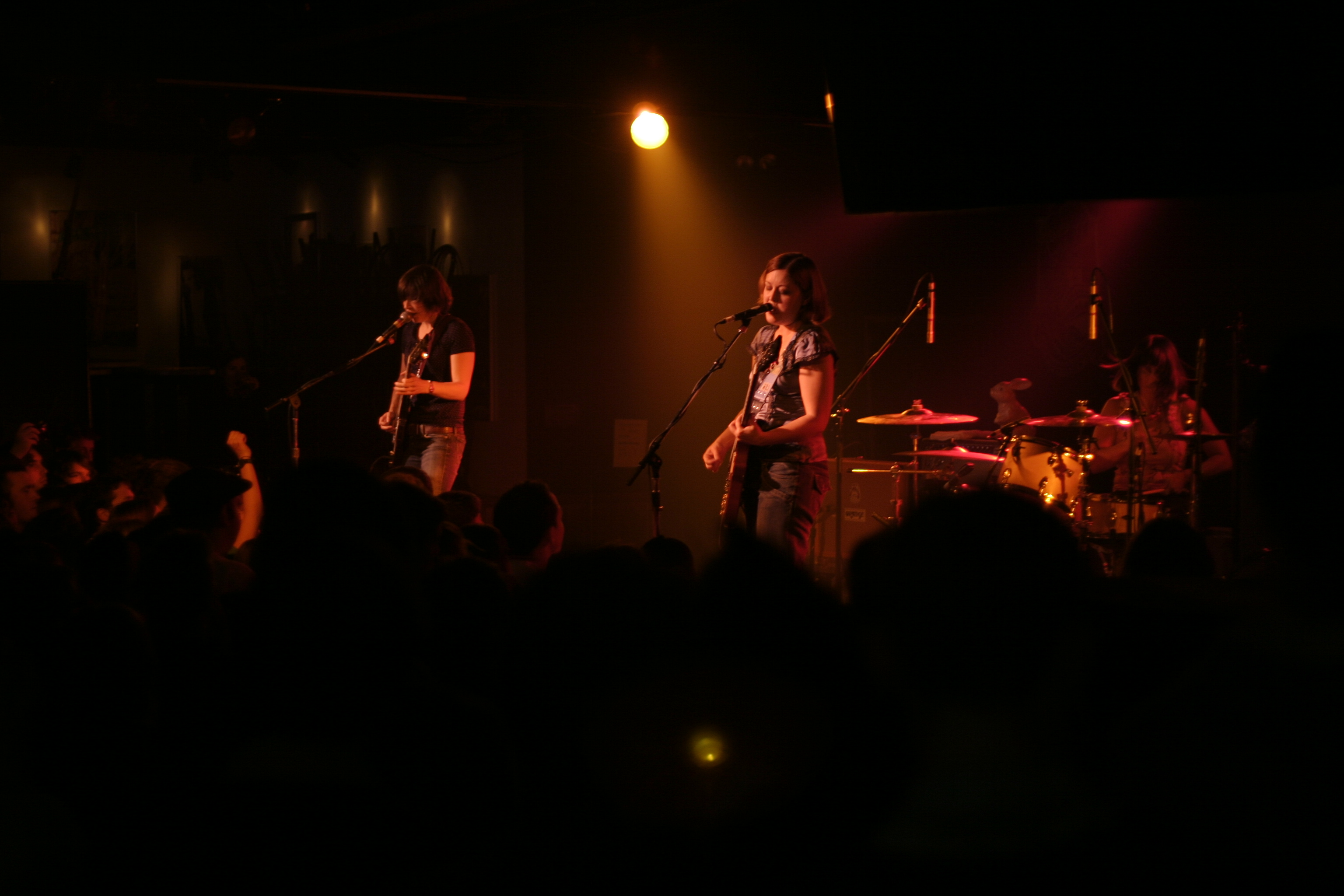
Sleater-Kinney in 2005. (Photo by Tyler Craft)

Sleater-Kinney's musical style was rooted in Olympia, Washington's punk and independent rock scenes of the early- to mid-1990s, forming around the last years of the riot grrrl movement. Both Tucker and Brownstein came from veteran acts from the beginning of the movement. Although the band's lyrics revolved around various topics, they were included in the riot grrrl movement because of the subject matter that supported feminist ideals. On the topic of the band's involvement in political movements, Carrie Brownstein was quoted, "Sleater-Kinney are brave enough and strong enough to make a difference and get the word out."

Their sound incorporates personal and social themes along with stripped-down music that was influenced by punk and the free-thinking ideals of the 1980s-1990s alternative and indie rock. They experimented with this foundation by bringing in different instruments and arrangements. Sleater-Kinney have been compared to female singers such as Siouxsie Sioux of Siouxsie and the Banshees, Patti Smith and Poly Styrene of X-Ray Spex. They have also named influences such as Bikini Kill, Mecca Normal, Bratmobile, Throwing Muses and Sonic Youth. Corin Tucker's emotional vocals and the band's lyrics alternate between personal and political topics, rebelling against war, traditionalism, gender roles and consumerism from feminist and progressive perspectives. Sleater-Kinney contributed the protest song "Off With Your Head" to NOFX leader Fat Mike's Rock Against Bush compilation. In 2017, Sleater-Kinney contributed the single "Here We Come" to 7-Inches For Planned Parenthood, which is a compilation of 7-inch records and digital downloads whose proceeds went to Planned Parenthood.

In a documentary about riot grrrl, Tucker revealed that her vocal style has always been intentionally harsh to suit the band's message and to demand focus from the listener, and her vocals have been described by AllMusic critic Heather Phares as "love-them-or-hate-them vocals." At the beginning of the band's career, lead vocals were often performed by Tucker, though as the band progressed, Brownstein began to perform more vocals. Both Brownstein and Tucker played guitar, with Brownstein usually handling lead and Tucker performing rhythm. Although Sleater-Kinney had no bass player, both Tucker and Brownstein tuned their guitars one and a half steps down (D♭ tuning), and some argued Tucker's tone and style enabled her to fill the same role as a bass guitar.

== Collaborations ==
In 1998, the band recorded "Big Big Lights" on the first split single (with Cypher in the Snow) in the series of recordings dealing with women's self-defense, entitled Free to Fight, and released on Candy Ass Records. In 2000, all three members of Sleater-Kinney assisted Robert Forster and Grant McLennan of the now-defunct Brisbane indie band The Go-Betweens to record the album The Friends of Rachel Worth.

In 2003, the band recorded the song "Angry Inch" with Fred Schneider of The B-52's for the Hedwig and the Angry Inch charity tribute album Wig in a Box. Proceeds for the album went to the Harvey Milk School, a school for gay, lesbian, bisexual, transgender, and questioning youth.

Tucker was featured on Eddie Vedder's solo album Into the Wild, where she performed vocals on the track "Hard Sun" along with Vedder. In 2008, Tucker collaborated again with Vedder on a cover of John Doe's "The Golden State" on Doe's own Golden State EP. On November 29, 2013, the members of Sleater-Kinney joined Pearl Jam, along with Scott McCaughey and Peter Buck of R.E.M., during a concert in Portland for a cover of Neil Young's "Rocking in the Free World".

In 2015, Sleater-Kinney collaborated with the makers of the animated sitcom Bob's Burgers to create a video for the song "A New Wave", from their album No Cities to Love. In the summer of 2021, they collaborated in a joint tour with the band Wilco.

== Legacy ==
R.E.M. guitarist Peter Buck has praised Sleater-Kinney, stating that they are his "favorite punk band ever." During an interview with The New York Times, Britt Daniel of the band Spoon said, "Even at that time, they felt legendary to me... Like they were coming out of nowhere with this sound that was totally unique and really aggressive. I hadn't seen anything like that before, I hadn't heard anything like that before." As a teenager, St. Vincent discovered All Hands on the Bad One, Sleater-Kinney's 2000 album, "and promptly went and mail-ordered every other Sleater-Kinney record at the time, had the posters on my wall," she said in a separate interview. Beth Ditto, singer of the Gossip, has emphasized the influence of the band in her career. British band Big Joanie has acknowledged the influence of the band and was included in the Dig Me Out covers album, released in 2022. The band covered the song "Things you say". Gerard Way of the band My Chemical Romance is a fan of the band; he appeared in the official video for the song "No Cities to Love" and has covered the song "I Wanna Be Your Joey Ramone" in concerts.

Corin Tucker was listed number 155 in the Rolling Stone's 2023 list of the 200 Best Singers, adding "Punk is full of loud voices, but Corin Tucker's voice stands out even in that genre".

== Members ==
Current members

- Carrie Brownstein – lead guitar, lead and backing vocals (1994–2006; 2014–present)
- Corin Tucker – lead and backing vocals, rhythm guitar (1994–2006; 2014–present)

Current touring musicians

- Angie Boylan – drums (2019–2021, 2022–present)
- Katie Harkin – rhythm guitar, keyboards, percussion, backing vocals (2015–2021, 2023–present)
- Toko Yasuda – keyboards, bass, backing vocals (2019–2021, 2023–present)
- Teeny Lieberson – rhythm guitar, keyboards, percussion, backing vocals (2024–present; substitute for Katie Harkin)

Former members

- Misty Farrell – drums, percussion (1994)
- Lora MacFarlane – drums, rhythm guitar, backing vocals (1995–1996)
- Toni Gogin – drums (1996)
- Janet Weiss – drums, backing vocals, harmonica, percussion (1996–2006; 2014–2019)

Former touring musicians

- Vincent Lirocchi – drums (2021–2022)
- Bill Athens – bass (2021–2022)
- Fabi Reyna – rhythm guitar, backing vocals, percussion (2021–2023)
- Galen Clark – keyboards (2021–2023)

== Discography ==
Studio albums

- Sleater-Kinney (1995)
- Call the Doctor (1996)
- Dig Me Out (1997)
- The Hot Rock (1999)
- All Hands on the Bad One (2000)
- One Beat (2002)
- The Woods (2005)
- No Cities to Love (2015)
- The Center Won't Hold (2019)
- Path of Wellness (2021)
- Little Rope (2024)

Live albums

- Live in Paris (2017)

Compilations

- Start Together (2014)
- Dig Me In: A Dig Me Out Covers Album (2022)
