= No Cities to Love =

Studio album by Sleater-Kinney
- Released: January 20, 2015
- Recorded: January–February 2014
- Studios: Electrokitty Recording (Seattle); Kung Fu Bakery Recording Studios (Portland, Oregon); Tiny Telephone (San Francisco)
- Genre: Punk rock
- Length: 32:17
- Label: Sub Pop
- Producer: John Goodmanson

Sleater-Kinney chronology
Start Together (2014)	No Cities to Love (2015)	The Center Won't Hold (2019)

Singles from No Cities to Love
- 1. "Bury Our Friends" Released: October 20, 2014

No Cities to Love is the eighth studio album by American rock band Sleater-Kinney, released on January 20, 2015, through Sub Pop. It is the first album following a decade-long hiatus and the band's 2005 release, The Woods. The album received universal acclaim from music critics and was listed on several "Best Albums of 2015" lists.

== Recording and release ==
The album was recorded in secret mostly at Tiny Telephone in San Francisco, with additional sessions at Electrokitty in Seattle and Kung Fu Bakery in Portland. It was produced by John Goodmanson.

On December 22, 2014, No Cities to Love was accidentally streamed three weeks early by Sub Pop. As of January 30, 2015, the album has sold 28,000 copies in the U.S. according to Nielsen SoundScan.

The video for the title track features celebrities singing the song, including Andy Samberg, Vanessa Bayer, Fred Armisen, Evan Rachel Wood, Connie Britton, Sarah Silverman, Norman Reedus, Miranda July, Brie Larson, Natasha Lyonne, Elliot Page, Dinosaur Jr.'s J Mascis, and My Chemical Romance's Gerard Way.

In support of the album, the band toured North America and Europe. Chicago Tribune critic Greg Kot listed the supporting tour as one of the winter's top rock shows.

== Critical reception ==
Professional ratings
Aggregate scores
Source	Rating
AnyDecentMusic?	8.7/10
Metacritic	90/100
Review scores
Source	Rating
AllMusic	4.5/5 stars
The A.V. Club	A−
Cuepoint (Expert Witness)	A
Entertainment Weekly	A
The Guardian	4/5 stars
The Irish Times	5/5 stars
NME	9/10
Pitchfork	8.7/10
Rolling Stone	4/5 stars
Spin	9/10

No Cities to Love was met with widespread critical acclaim. At Metacritic, which assigns a normalized rating out of 100 to reviews from mainstream publications, it received an average score of 90, based on 39 reviews. Los Angeles Times critic Randall Roberts said "the work commands attention", while Jon Pareles from The New York Times said it was "the first great album of 2015", full of "hurtling, bristling, densely packed, white-knuckled songs that are all taut construction and raw nerve". Robert Christgau gave the record an "A" and felt it may be Sleater-Kinney's best record, while writing in Cuepoint: "Honed back down to punky three-minute songs because the leisure to stretch out is a luxury they can't presently afford, the music carries the seed of tumult to come, the sense that something or everything could explode without notice just the way this album did." In The Observer, Kitty Empire said the band had executed "pretty much the most perfect comeback of recent years" and sounded "exactly as taut and emotive as they used to." Writing with high praise for Exclaim!, Chris Bilton called the record "a thoroughly raging collection of post-punk anthems that nudges up the powerful perfection of 2005's The Woods at least another notch." Music journalist Graham Reid said it had "all the stabbing energy of Gang of Four, the blazing passion of Siouxsie Sioux and the drama of Hole at their (rare) best". In an interview for Rolling Stone, musician St. Vincent said it was her favorite Sleater-Kinney record so far and "a crowning jewel in their legacy".

=== Accolades ===
Publication	Rank	List
AllMusic		Best Rock Albums of 2015
American Songwriter	49	Top 50 Albums of 2015
The A.V. Club	2	The 15 Best Albums of 2015
Billboard	14	25 Best Albums of 2015
Clash	7	Top 50 Albums of 2015
Consequence of Sound	8	Top 50 Albums of 2015
Cosmopolitan	9	The 15 Best Albums of 2015
The Daily Beast	1	The Best Albums of 2015
Diffuser	6	The 50 Best Albums of 2015
Drowned in Sound	9	Favourite Albums of 2015
Entertainment Weekly	14	The 40 Best Albums of 2015
Exclaim!	4	Top 20 Pop & Rock Albums of 2015
FasterLouder	4	The 50 Best Albums of 2015
Gigwise	30	Top 55 Albums of 2015
The Guardian	6	The Best Albums of 2015
Loud and Quiet	10	Top 40 Albums of 2015
Magnet	12	Top 25 Albums of 2015
Mashable	21	The 30 Best Albums of 2015
MOJO	14	50 Best Albums of 2015
MusicOMH	2	Top 50 Albums of 2015
Newsweek	17	The Top 20 Albums of 2015
NME	13	NME's Albums of the Year 2015
No Ripcord	7	Top 50 Albums of 2015
Paste	4	The 50 Best Albums of 2015
Pitchfork	27	The 50 Best Albums of 2015
PopMatters	16	The 80 Best Albums of 2015
Pretty Much Amazing	11	Best 50 Albums of 2015
Q	35	The 50 Best Albums of 2015
Reverb	3	The Ten Best Albums of 2015
Rolling Stone	11	50 Best Albums of 2015
Rough Trade	60	Albums of the Year 2015
The Skinny	1	The 50 Best Albums of 2015
Spin	11	The 50 Best Albums of 2015
Sputnikmusic	7	Top 50 Albums of 2015
Stereogum	27	The 50 Best Albums of 2015
Time	9	Top 10 Best Albums of 2015
Time Out London	40	The 50 Best Albums of 2015
Treble	6	The 50 Best Albums of 2015
Uncut	23	Top 75 Albums of 2015
Under the Radar	17	Top 100 Albums of 2015
Variance	32	The 50 Best Albums of 2015

== Track listing ==
All tracks are written by Sleater-Kinney.

No.	Title	Length
1.	"Price Tag"	3:54
2.	"Fangless"	3:34
3.	"Surface Envy"	3:06
4.	"No Cities to Love"	3:05
5.	"A New Wave"	3:38
6.	"No Anthems"	3:19
7.	"Gimme Love"	2:16
8.	"Bury Our Friends"	3:23
9.	"Hey Darling"	2:25
10.	"Fade"	3:37
Total length:		32:17

Vinyl bonus tracks
No.	Title	Length
11.	"The Fog and Filthy Air"	3:22
12.	"Heavy (When I Need It)"	3:13
Total length:		38:52

== Personnel ==
Credits adapted from AllMusic

Sleater-Kinney

- Corin Tucker — guitar, vocals
- Carrie Brownstein — guitar, vocals
- Janet Weiss — drums

Technical personnel

- Greg Calbi — mastering
- John Goodmanson — engineer, mixing, production
- Thea Lorentzen — cover photo, design
- Mike Mills — art direction, cover photo, design
- Jay Pellicci — engineer
- Garrett G. Reynolds — engineer
- Brigitte Sire — band photo

== Charts ==
=== Weekly charts ===
Chart (2015)	Peak position
Australian Albums (ARIA)	63
Belgian Albums (Ultratop Flanders)	152
US Billboard 200	18
US Digital Albums (Billboard)	15
US Independent Albums (Billboard)	2
US Top Alternative Albums (Billboard)	4
US Top Rock Albums (Billboard)	4
US Indie Store Album Sales (Billboard)	1

=== Year-end charts ===
Chart (2015)	Position
US Top Rock Albums (Billboard)	75
