= The Hot Rock (album) =

Studio album by Sleater-Kinney
- Released: February 23, 1999
- Recorded: July 1998
- Studios: Avast!, Seattle, Washington
- Genre: Punk rock
- Length: 41:40
- Label: Kill Rock Stars
- Producer: Roger Moutenot

Sleater-Kinney chronology
Dig Me Out (1997)	The Hot Rock (1999)	All Hands on the Bad One (2000)

Singles from The Hot Rock
- 1. "Get Up" Released: January 22, 1999; 2. "A Quarter to Three" Released: April 6, 1999

The Hot Rock is the fourth studio album by the American rock band Sleater-Kinney, released on February 23, 1999, by Kill Rock Stars. It was produced by Roger Moutenot and recorded at the Avast! recording studio in Seattle, Washington, in July 1998. The Hot Rock marks a considerable change in the band's sound, veering into a more relaxed and gloomy direction than the raucous punk rock style of its predecessors. The lyrical themes of the album explore issues of failed relationships and personal uncertainty.

Upon release, The Hot Rock reached number 181 on the U.S. Billboard 200 chart and number 12 on the Heatseekers Albums chart, becoming the first Sleater-Kinney album to enter the charts. Two songs from the album, "Get Up" and "A Quarter to Three", were released as singles. The album received positive reviews from music critics, who praised the songwriting and the vocal and guitar interplay between band members Corin Tucker and Carrie Brownstein.

== Background and recording ==
The Hot Rock is the follow-up to Sleater-Kinney's highly acclaimed third album Dig Me Out, released in 1997 by the independent record label Kill Rock Stars. After the success of Dig Me Out and its predecessor Call the Doctor, several major record labels grew interested in the band and offered them recording contracts, but the band ultimately decided to remain on Kill Rock Stars. As singer and guitarist Corin Tucker recalls, "We want to project the image that we're successful". Co-vocalist and guitarist Carrie Brownstein added, "And we're proud that we've been able to do that from a tiny label [...] We've been able to do it non-traditionally, and hopefully that's inspiring and encouraging to people".

For its fourth album, Sleater-Kinney wanted to work with producer Roger Moutenot due to his textural work on Yo La Tengo's critically acclaimed 1997 album I Can Hear the Heart Beating as One. This marked a change from regular producer John Goodmanson, who had recorded every previous Sleater-Kinney album. As Tucker explained, "These songs warranted a different production, so we looked to other people". The band wanted to expand their sound and challenge themselves in new ways, stating that it was important for them not to make the same record twice. According to Tucker, "We have to keep pushing in order to stay interested in making music together, we want to have longevity as a band". Similarly, drummer Janet Weiss stated that they "wanted the record to sound different than Dig Me Out, to make each song have a real strong personality". The album was written over the course of a year, which was the longest period the band had spent on making an album. It was recorded at the Avast! recording studio in Seattle, Washington in July 1998.

== Music and lyrics ==
The Hot Rock marks a considerable change in the band's sound, veering into a more relaxed and gloomy direction than the raucous punk rock style of its predecessors. As Rolling Stone noted, Sleater-Kinney "delved into more oblique sounds [...] Brownstein's abandoned power chords to slither in abstract patterns, backed by Weiss' increasingly subtle and complex drumming [and] Tucker expanded her vocal range steering from bellow to fragile ululations". Likewise, The Village Voice writer Sara Sherr considered The Hot Rock to be Sleater-Kinney's darkest album. Brownstein remarked that the album's sound and lyrics were heavily influenced by the music of The Go-Betweens.

Unlike previous Sleater-Kinney albums, most of the lyrical themes on The Hot Rock are more intimate, exploring failed relationships and personal uncertainty. As Weiss recalled, the songs are "really honest, even if they're sometimes unpleasant. The lyrics evoke so many emotions. Our analogies are visual and the metaphors are direct. Corin and Carrie are singing about things they care about". The album features a notable amount of vocal and guitar interplay between Tucker and Brownstein, who interweave their voices and play off each other to create very atmospheric songs such as "The End of You" and "Burn Don't Freeze". Music critic Robert Christgau said that "even reading the booklet it's hard to keep track of who's saying what to whom about what, as if they'd fallen in love with (or to) the Velvets' 'Murder Mystery'".

The title track "Hot Rock", named after the 1972 film of the same name, notes the similarities between relationships and jewelry heists. The song "Banned from the End of the World" deals with the Y2K crisis and an uncertain future, while "God Is a Number" alludes to the impact of technology in society. The single "Get Up" features lead guitar lines by Brownstein and staccato riffs by Tucker. For Tucker, the song reflects the album's thematic structure: "It's more metaphorical and spiritual [...] It's not about one concrete thing; it's about searching for meaning and maybe finding it an unexpected place". The tracks "The Size of Our Love" and "Memorize Your Lines" feature violin lines by Seth Warren of Red Stars Theory. The Village Voice described the former song, a ballad about two lovers in trouble, as "the saddest of the sad". The last song, "A Quarter to Three", features slide guitar work by the album's producer.

== Release ==
The Hot Rock was released on February 23, 1999, by Kill Rock Stars. The album cover is a photo shot on Southwest Broadway in Portland, Oregon. The Hot Rock reached number 181 on the U.S. Billboard 200 chart and number 12 on the Heatseekers Albums chart, becoming the first Sleater-Kinney album to enter the charts. After its release, the band supported the album with a tour across the United States, sharing stages with various bands including Sonic Youth, Guided by Voices, Bratmobile, and Superchunk. As of July 1999, the album has sold 42,000 copies in the U.S. according to Nielsen SoundScan. As of February 2015, The Hot Rock has sold 97,000 copies.

Two songs from the album, "Get Up" and "A Quarter to Three", were released as singles on January 22, 1999, and April 6, 1999, by Kill Rock Stars and Matador Records respectively. The first single features an outtake, "By the Time You're Twenty Five", as the B-side, while the second single features "Burn, Don't Freeze" from The Hot Rock. The CD version of "Get Up" includes a third song, "Tapping", which is another outtake from the album's studio sessions. A music video was made for "Get Up" under the direction of writer and performance artist Miranda July. According to July, the video alludes to the band's friends. For example, the field where most of the music video was filmed stands near the house of Kill Rock Stars labelmate and Unwound bassist Vern Rumsey.

== Critical reception ==
Professional ratings
Review scores
Source	Rating
AllMusic	4/5 stars
Chicago Sun-Times	3.5/4 stars
Entertainment Weekly	A
Los Angeles Times	3/4 stars
NME	8/10
Pitchfork	7.7/10 (1999); 8.8/10 (2014)
Q	3/5 stars
Rolling Stone	3.5/5 stars
The Rolling Stone Album Guide	3/5 stars
The Village Voice	A

The Hot Rock received positive reviews from music critics. AllMusic reviewer Steve Huey said that The Hot Rock "isn't quite as immediately satisfying as its two brilliant predecessors, but it does reward those willing to spend time absorbing its nervy introspection and moodiness". Huey also praised the band's use of dynamic tempo changes within the album's songs. Wendy Mitchell, writing for CMJ New Music Monthly, felt that the band "has matured into the musical equivalent of a twentysomething; still holding on to the energy of its youth, but exploring new options". The A.V. Club writer Stephen Thompson opined that The Hot Rock "lacks the blaze-of-glory freshness of its justly acclaimed predecessors, [...] but [the album] works just fine on its own as a terrific, explosive, and fun rock record".

Rolling Stone editor Rob Sheffield opined that the album's "expansive new sound gives Sleater-Kinney room to experiment with their Husker Du-style storytelling" and felt that the band had grown as songwriters. He cited the song "The Size of Our Love" as the highlight of the album, commenting: "No other band could have made this song hit home—not even Sleater-Kinney, until now. They've earned the right to keep reinventing themselves". Writing for The Village Voice, Sara Sherr gave high marks to Tucker's vibrato, describing it as "a human teardrop [...] The one that hits you and feels like a kiss", while Robert Christgau praised the vocal interplay between Tucker and Brownstein, stating that the band "emerges as a diary of adulthood in all its encroaching intricacy".

In a very positive review, Will Hermes of Entertainment Weekly highlighted the depth of the group's interplay, commenting that "Tucker explores what her voice can do when it's not in overdrive, stretching vowels like a religious supplicant or spewing prosody like Patti Smith. At the same time, Brownstein blossoms as a singer herself [...] braiding lines with Tucker so artfully the result sounds like the voicings of a single restless mind". He considered The Hot Rock as Sleater-Kinney's "most finely turned record" and that its music "never falters". Peter Tarizan of Out magazine credited the work of the producer for polishing the band's sound without losing its intensity or muscle. The album appeared at number 23 in The Village Voice's Pazz & Jop critics' poll for 1999. Similarly, Spin placed The Hot Rock at number 18 in its list of "The Top 20 Albums of 1999". In 2002, Rolling Stone ranked the album at number 17 on its list of "Women in Rock: The 50 Essential Albums".

== Track listing ==
All music is composed by Sleater-Kinney.

No.	Title	Length
1.	"Start Together"	2:38
2.	"Hot Rock"	3:17
3.	"The End of You"	3:20
4.	"Burn, Don't Freeze"	3:19
5.	"God Is a Number"	3:44
6.	"Banned from the End of the World"	2:09
7.	"Don't Talk Like"	3:04
8.	"Get Up"	3:46
9.	"One Song for You"	2:49
10.	"The Size of Our Love"	3:12
11.	"Living in Exile"	2:31
12.	"Memorize Your Lines"	3:10
13.	"A Quarter to Three"	4:03
Total length:		41:40

== Personnel ==
Credits are adapted from the album's liner notes.

Sleater-Kinney

- Carrie Brownstein – guitar, vocals
- Corin Tucker – vocals, guitar
- Janet Weiss – drums, percussion

Additional musicians

- Seth Warren – violin on "The Size of Our Love" and "Memorize Your Lines"
- Roger Moutenot – slide guitar on "A Quarter to Three"

Technical personnel

- Roger Moutenot – production
- Kip Beelman – engineering
- Greg Calbi – mastering
