= Dig Me Out =

Studio album by Sleater-Kinney
- Released: April 8, 1997
- Recorded: December 1996 – January 1997
- Studios: John and Stu's, Seattle, Washington
- Genre: Punk rock
- Length: 36:34
- Label: Kill Rock Stars
- Producer: John Goodmanson

Sleater-Kinney chronology
Call the Doctor (1996)	Dig Me Out (1997)	The Hot Rock (1999)

Singles from Dig Me Out
- 1. "One More Hour" Released: June 1, 1998; 2. "Little Babies" Released: September 7, 1998

Dig Me Out is the third studio album by the American rock band Sleater-Kinney, released on April 8, 1997, on the Kill Rock Stars label. The album was produced by John Goodmanson and recorded from December 1996 to January 1997 at John and Stu's Place in Seattle, Washington. Dig Me Out marked the debut of Janet Weiss, who would become the band's longest-serving drummer. The music on the record was influenced by traditional rock and roll bands, while the lyrics deal with issues of heartbreak and survival. The album cover is an homage to the Kinks' 1965 album The Kink Kontroversy.

Two singles were released in support of the album: "One More Hour" and "Little Babies". The title track "Dig Me Out" peaked at number six on the KEXP Top 90.3 Album Chart in 1997 without being released as a single. The album was acclaimed by music critics, who praised the album's energy and feminist lyrics. Retrospectively, Dig Me Out is considered the band's breakthrough record and is frequently included on several publications' best album lists. In 2020, Rolling Stone ranked it No. 189 on its list of The 500 Greatest Albums of All Time.

== Background and recording ==
Dig Me Out is the follow-up to Sleater-Kinney's highly acclaimed second album Call the Doctor, released in 1996 by the queercore independent record label Chainsaw Records. Call the Doctor confirmed the band's reputation as one of the major musical acts from the Pacific Northwest, rebelling against gender roles, consumerism, and indie rock's male-dominated hierarchy. After the release of Call the Doctor, drummer Janet Weiss of Quasi joined the band. Previously, the band had had a number of temporary drummers, including Misty Farrell, Lora Macfarlane, and Toni Gogin. Weiss would eventually become Sleater-Kinney's longest serving drummer. For its third album, Sleater-Kinney worked again with producer John Goodmanson. The band left Chainsaw Records and decided to release the album through Kill Rock Stars, another independent record label which singer and guitarist Corin Tucker thought had better resources to ensure the band's distribution. Goodmanson also remarked that Kill Rock Stars afforded the band a generous amount of studio time for an independent label, stating that Call the Doctor only took four days to record while Dig Me Out was recorded over the period of eight days.

Dig Me Out was written in nearly two months and recorded from December 1996 to January 1997 at John and Stu's Place in Seattle, Washington. During the recording sessions, recording the vocal interplay between Tucker and co-vocalist and guitarist Carrie Brownstein involved some difficulties. However, the producer took care and prevented favoring one voice over the other. As Goodmanson recalls: "We always used different mikes for the lead vocal and for the second vocal, or different kinds of processing to make those things really distinct. To make it so you can hear both things at once". Goodmanson also noted that the fact that the band features no bass player was an advantage for the album's production. He explained: "The awesome thing about having no bass player is you can make the guitars sound as big as you want. Usually you have to clear all that room out for the bass, so you can hear the bass line. With no bass there, you can just go for giant guitar sounds that you wouldn't normally be able to go for".

== Music and lyrics ==
Musically, Dig Me Out was considered rockier than its predecessor. Weiss' drumming style was influenced by traditional rock and roll bands such as the Rolling Stones, the Beatles, and the Kinks, as well as numerous blues rock musicians such as Lightnin' Hopkins, Muddy Waters, Billy Boy Arnold, and Bessie Smith, among others. Both Tucker and Brownstein remarked that Weiss became an essential part of the band's sound. According to Tucker, "Musically, she's completed our band. She's become the bottom end and the solidness that we've really wanted for our songwriting". In addition to playing drums, Weiss provides hand claps and tambourine in "Turn It On". Dig Me Out also contains more guitar and vocal interplay by Tucker and Brownstein than Call the Doctor. As Brownstein explains, "If you were to separate our guitar parts I don't necessarily think they would fully stand on their own. Our songs [...] aren't really complete until the other person has put their part over it, and their vocals".

The lyrical themes on Dig Me Out deal with issues of heartbreak and survival. The song "One More Hour" is about the breakup of Tucker and Brownstein's romantic relationship. Before the release of the album, Spin published a controversial article discussing Tucker and Brownstein's personal relationship without their permission. Brownstein felt that "it was a complete invasion of privacy. My parents didn't know Corin and I were going out. They didn't know I had ever dated a woman before. It was horrible. I was pissed at Spin, really mad. Luckily my parents are great people, but God forbid I would have some family that would disown me over something like that. And I would have totally held Spin responsible for that." The song features a lot of vocal interplay by Tucker and Brownstein. Chris Nelson of Addicted to Noise noted that "one can almost hear Tucker crying in the studio as she wails, 'I needed it', while behind her Brownstein offers her attempts at consolation". In her 2015 memoir Hunger Makes Me A Modern Girl, Brownstein also states that almost all the songs on Dig Me Out are about either her or Tucker's future husband, Lance Bangs.

Like its predecessor, Dig Me Out also features songs that show frustration with sexism and gender stereotypes; according to Ann Powers of Spin, the album's title track exposes a woman in a dominant role. Tucker said "Little Babies" was, "In some ways, [...] a response to dealing with the impact you have on fans when you're a performer", and trying to take care of people without losing yourself "because people think they own you". The album's title was inspired by the fact that the band had to literally dig out the recording studio after a heavy snowstorm that took place in Winter 1996 in Seattle. Musically, the song "Words and Guitar" was said to "[leap] and [skit] with the just-released repression of early Talking Heads", while "Dance Song '97" was said to "sport Devo-esque keyboards of a distinctly '80s vintage". Jenn Pelly of Pitchfork described "Heart Factory" as a song that "roars over synthetic emotions of the Prozac Nation."

== Release ==
Dig Me Out was released on April 8, 1997, by Kill Rock Stars. The album cover is an homage to the Kinks' 1965 album The Kink Kontroversy. The layouts are identical, with the exception that the Kinks had a fourth member and thus a fourth portrait lining the top. Sleater-Kinney substituted their own portraits and their own guitars, with Tucker's Danelectro DC-3 in the central image. As a fan of the Kinks, Weiss explained that the cover suggested that Sleater-Kinney could be an example of a "revered" rock band. When Dig Me Out was released, the band went on a tour to promote the album; a performance of "Words and Guitar" at El Rey Theatre, Los Angeles is featured in the documentary film Songs for Cassavetes by Justin Mitchell. As of July 1999, the album had sold 64,000 copies in the U.S. according to Nielsen SoundScan. As of February 2015, Dig Me Out had sold 130,000 copies.

Two songs from the album, "One More Hour" and "Little Babies", were released as singles by Matador Records on June 1, 1998, and September 7, 1998, respectively. The first single features the song "I Wanna Be Your Joey Ramone" from Call the Doctor as the B-side, while the second single features "I'm Not Waiting", also from their previous album. The compact disc version of "One More Hour" includes a third song, "Don't Think You Wanna", which was originally released on the band's debut album Sleater-Kinney. The song "Dig Me Out" peaked at number six on the KEXP Top 90.3 Album Chart in 1997 without being released as a single.

== Critical reception ==
Professional ratings
Review scores
Source	Rating
AllMusic	4.5/5 stars
Encyclopedia of Popular Music	4/5 stars
Entertainment Weekly	B+
Los Angeles Times	3.5/4 stars
NME	8/10
Pitchfork	9.3/10
Rolling Stone	4/5 stars
The Rolling Stone Album Guide	4/5 stars
Spin	9/10
The Village Voice	A

Upon release, Dig Me Out received substantial acclaim from music critics. Randall Roberts, writing for CMJ New Music Monthly, described the album as a "hum of life wholly transcending gender and genre, filled with the kind of excitement and singular voice that made punk rock glorious in its infancy [...] Dig Me Out is a monster". Sara Scribner of Los Angeles Times praised Tucker's emotional vocal delivery, writing that "she's obsessed with finding honest emotions within the cold machinery of the human heart." Ann Powers stated similar pros and highlighted Brownstein's energetic guitar playing, noting that the band "now [delivers] the punch their words describe." She also gave high marks to the album's feminist lyrics, commenting "If [Sleater-Kinney] wanna be our Simone de Beauvoir, Dig Me Out proves they're up to it." Similarly, Matt Diehl of Rolling Stone said that, "while the Spice Girls prattle on about 'girl power', Sleater-Kinney remain the real socket for that energy".

AllMusic reviewer Jason Ankeny credited the band for expanding their musical boundaries with a more confident and mature sound. Wook Kim of Entertainment Weekly praised Tucker and Brownstein's "interlocking" vocals and called the record a "fine example of state-of-the-art punk". In The Village Voice, critic Robert Christgau praised the union and teamwork of the band, stating that "they're so confident of their ability to please that they just can't stop. And this confidence is collective: Corin and Carrie chorus-trade like the two-headed girl, dashing and high-stepping around on Janet Weiss's shoulders. What a ride". Dig Me Out appeared at No. 4 in The Village Voice's Pazz & Jop critics' poll for 1997. In the poll's accompanying essay, Christgau referred to the album as one of his "favorite albums of the year, easy", alongside those by Pavement, Yo La Tengo, and Arto Lindsay. Similarly, Spin journalists placed the album at No. 3 in their list of Top 20 Albums of the Year.

In 2026 Rolling Stone placed it at 5 on their list of The 100 Greatest Punk Albums of All Time.

== Legacy ==
Retrospectively, Dig Me Out is considered Sleater-Kinney's breakthrough album. According to About.com's Anthony Carew, the record took the band "from the cult corner of the Pacific Northwest to international acclaim". Writing for Nooga.com, Joshua Pickard stated that the album "was a revelation for both its clever use of punk principles and for its breakdown of social assumptions." With the album, Pickard felt that Sleater-Kinney "succeeded in reshaping what was considered possible for punk rock", and that the album transformed the band into "an institution of rebellion and proponents of a musical insurgency. And they never compromised on their ideas of what music could and should be."

Dig Me Out is frequently included on several publications' best album lists. In 1999, Spin editors ranked it at No. 21 on their list of The 90 Greatest Albums of the '90s. In 2001, the magazine placed it at No. 19 on its list of 50 Most Essential Punk Records. In 2005, the album was ranked No. 24 in Spin's 100 Greatest Albums, 1985–2005. In 2008, the song "Dig Me Out" was ranked No. 44 in Rolling Stone's "100 Greatest Guitar Songs of All Time". In 2011, the album was placed at No. 71 by Slant Magazine on its list of The 100 Best Albums of the 1990s. In 2012, the album was ranked No. 272 on Rolling Stone's 500 Greatest Albums of All Time, and No. 189 on their 2020 edition. Spin ranked it at No. 74 on their 125 Best Albums of the Past 25 Years, stating that "Dig Me Out captures the noise of a soul-filled body shaking itself awake, and that's an experience that bridges any gender divide." The album was ranked No. 47 on Pitchfork's 150 Best Albums of the 1990s. Staff writer Laura Snapes said: "Dig Me Out is one of the rare rock albums that makes a case for rock as a revivifying force and does not whiff." The album was also included in the book 1001 Albums You Must Hear Before You Die.

== Track listing ==
All music is composed by Sleater-Kinney.

No.	Title	Length
1.	"Dig Me Out"	2:40
2.	"One More Hour"	3:19
3.	"Turn It On"	2:47
4.	"The Drama You've Been Craving"	2:08
5.	"Heart Factory"	3:54
6.	"Words and Guitar"	2:21
7.	"It's Enough"	1:46
8.	"Little Babies"	2:22
9.	"Not What You Want"	3:17
10.	"Buy Her Candy"	2:02
11.	"Things You Say"	2:56
12.	"Dance Song '97"	2:49
13.	"Jenny"	4:03
Total length:		36:34

== Personnel ==
Credits are adapted from the album's liner notes.

Sleater-Kinney

- Carrie Brownstein – guitar, vocals
- Corin Tucker – vocals, guitar
- Janet Weiss – drums, percussion

Additional musicians

- Jessica Lurie – saxophone on "It's Enough"

Technical personnel

- John Goodmanson – producer
- John Clark – photography
- Robert Paul Maxwell – photography
