= Carrie Brownstein =

American musician and actress (born 1974)

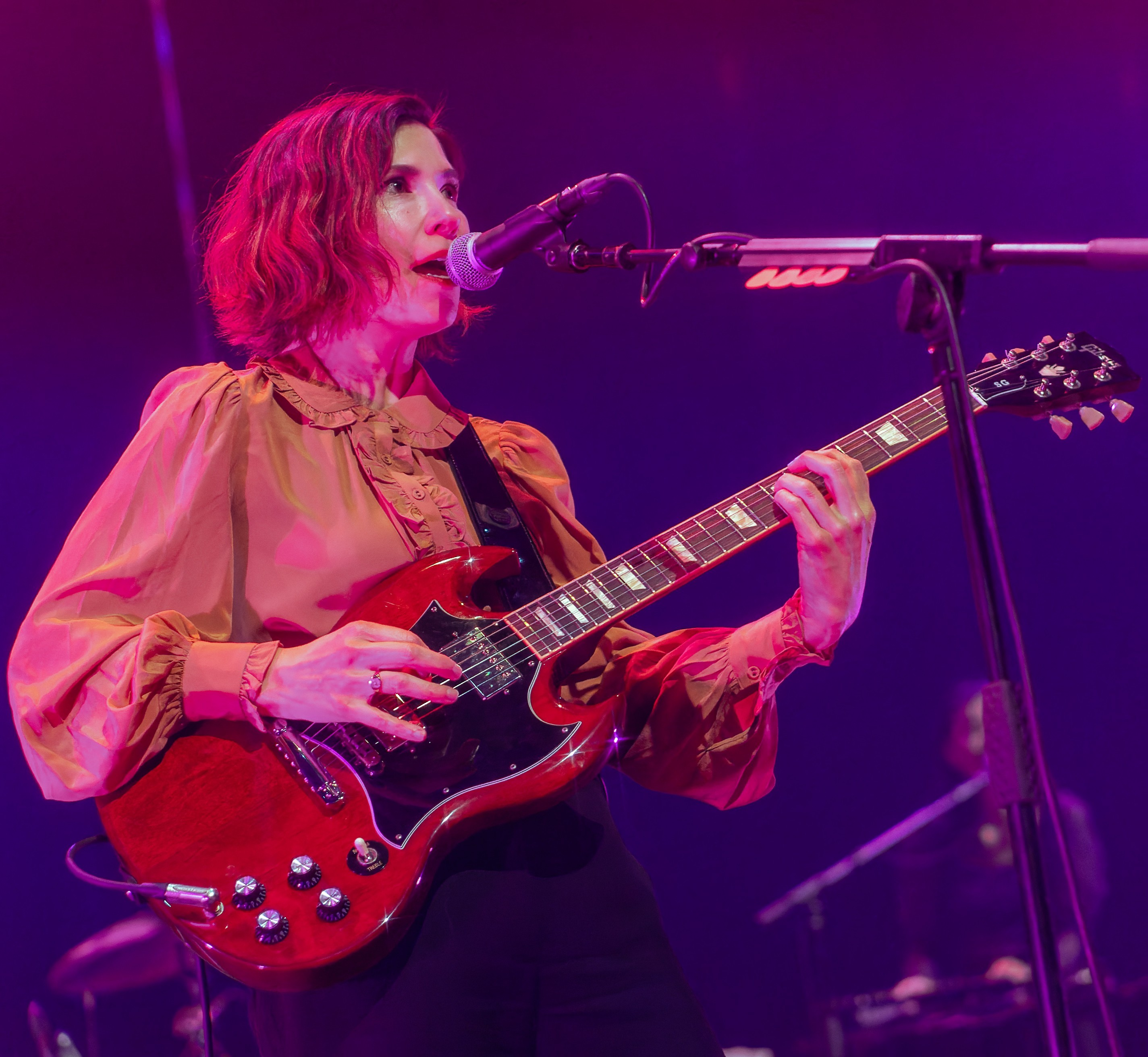
- Brownstein performing in 2023
- Born: Carrie Rachel Brownstein; September 27, 1974 (age 52); Seattle, Washington, U.S.
- Education: Western Washington University (attended); Evergreen State College (BA)
- Occupations: Musician; writer; actress
- Musical career
- Genres: Punk rock; indie rock; riot grrrl
- Instruments: Guitar; vocals
- Years active: 1993–present
- Member of: Sleater-Kinney
- Formerly of: Excuse 17; Wild Flag

Carrie Rachel Brownstein (born September 27, 1974) is an American musician, actress, writer, director, and comedian. She first came to prominence as a member of the band Excuse 17 before forming the rock trio Sleater-Kinney.

During a long hiatus from Sleater-Kinney, she formed the group Wild Flag. During this period, Brownstein wrote and appeared in a series of comedy sketches alongside Fred Armisen that were developed into the satirical comedy TV series Portlandia (2011–2018). The series went on to win Emmy and Peabody Awards.

Sleater-Kinney eventually reunited. As of 2026, she is still touring with the band.

== Early life and education ==
Brownstein was born in Seattle, Washington, and raised in Redmond in a secular Jewish family. Her mother was a housewife and a teacher, and her father was a corporate lawyer. They divorced when Carrie was 14, and she was raised by her father. Brownstein has a younger sister, Stacey.

She attended Lake Washington High School before transferring to The Overlake School for her senior year.

Brownstein began playing guitar at 15 and received lessons from Jeremy Enigk. She later said: "He lived in the neighborhood next to mine, so I would just walk my guitar over to his house. He showed me a couple of open chords and I just took it from there. I'd gone through so many phases as a kid with my interests that my parents put their foot down with guitar. So [the instrument] ended up being the [first] thing that I had to save up my own money for – and maybe that was the whole reason that I actually stuck with it."

After high school, Brownstein attended Western Washington University before transferring to The Evergreen State College. In 1997, Brownstein graduated from Evergreen with an emphasis on sociolinguistics and stayed in Olympia, Washington, for three years before moving to Portland, Oregon in 2001.

== Career ==
=== Music ===
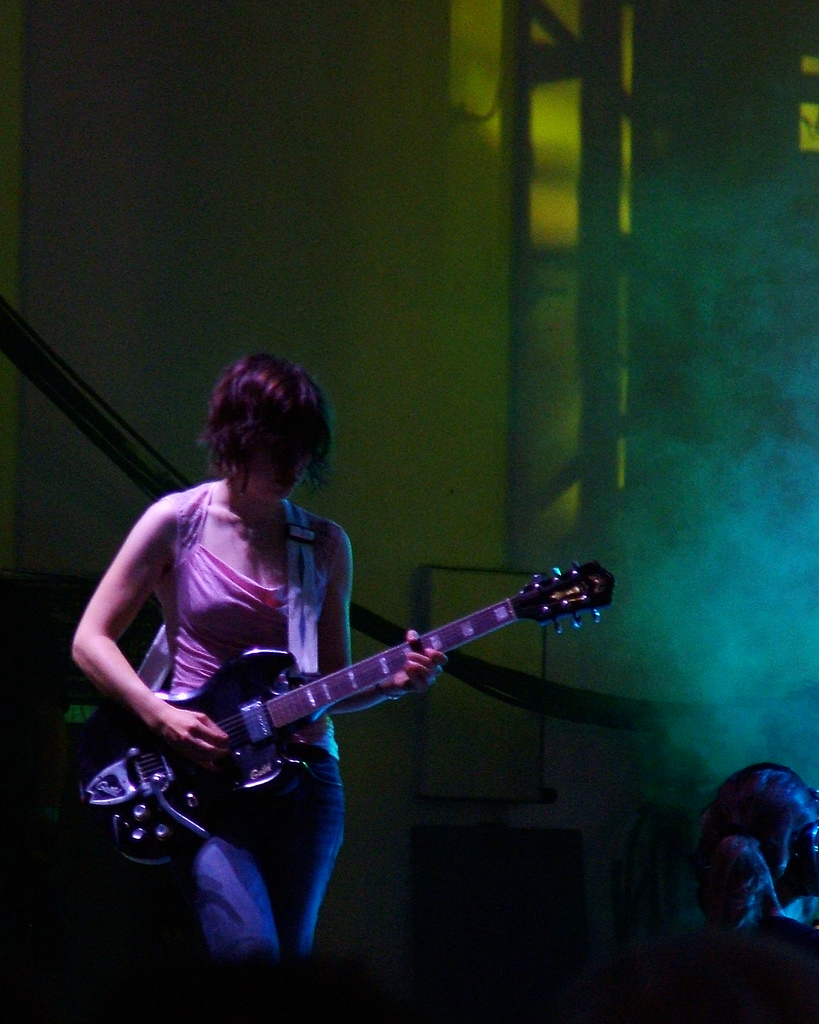
Brownstein performed at Lollapalooza 2006.

==== Excuse 17 ====
While attending Evergreen, Brownstein met fellow students Corin Tucker, Kathleen Hanna, Tobi Vail, and Becca Albee. With Albee and CJ Phillips, she formed the band Excuse 17, one of the pioneering bands of the riot grrrl movement in the Olympia music scene that played an important role in third-wave feminism. Excuse 17 often toured with Tucker's band Heavens to Betsy. The two bands contributed to the Free to Fight compilation. With Tucker, she formed the band Sleater-Kinney as a side project and later released the split single Free to Fight with Cypher in the Snow.

==== Sleater-Kinney ====
After both Excuse 17 and Heavens to Betsy split up, Sleater-Kinney became Brownstein and Tucker's main focus. They recorded their first self-titled album in early 1994 during a trip to Australia, where the pair were celebrating Tucker's graduation from Evergreen, and Brownstein still had three years of college left. It was released the following year. They recorded and toured with different drummers, until Janet Weiss joined the band in 1996. Following their eponymous debut, they released six more studio albums before going on indefinite hiatus in 2006. In a 2012 interview with DIY magazine, Brownstein said that Sleater-Kinney still planned to play in the future. On October 20, 2014, Brownstein announced on Twitter that Sleater-Kinney would be releasing a new album, No Cities to Love, on January 20, 2015, and would tour in early 2015. At the same time the announcement was made, they released the video for the first single from the album. The single, "Bury Our Friends", was also made available as a free MP3 download.

Critics Greil Marcus and Robert Christgau deemed the band one of the essential rock groups of the early 2000s. In 2015, Stereogum Chief Editor Tom Breihan called them the greatest rock band of the past two decades.

==== Other work ====
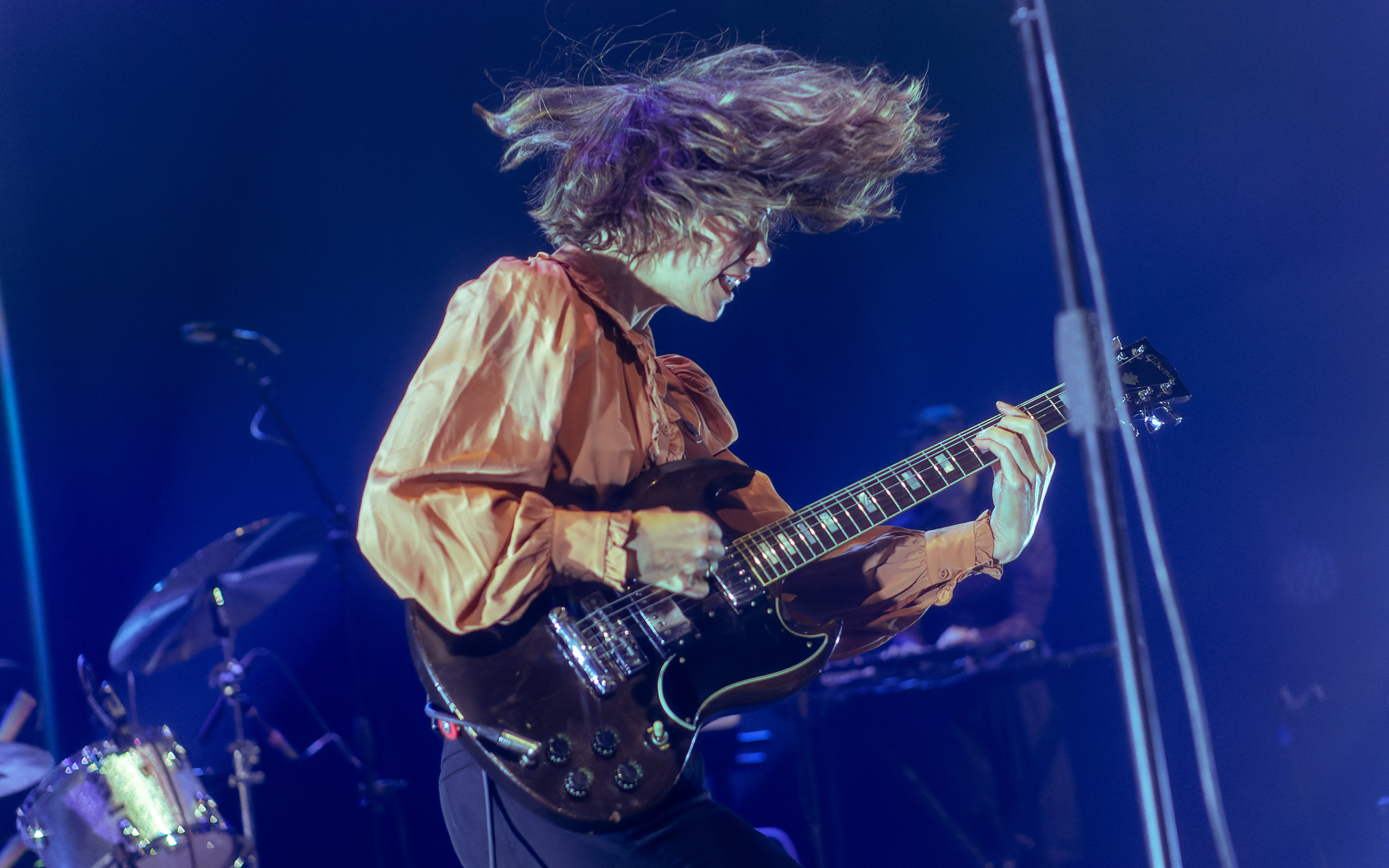
Brownstein performed with Sleater-Kinney in 2023 in London.

Brownstein and former Helium guitarist/singer Mary Timony, recording as The Spells, released The Age of Backwards E.P. in 1999.

Also in 1999, Brownstein, Lois Maffeo, and Peter Momtchiloff released a single ("The Touch"/"Louie Louie Got Married") on K Records as The Tentacles.

In mid-2009, Brownstein and Weiss worked together on songs (produced by Tucker Martine) for the soundtrack of the documentary film !Women Art Revolution by Lynn Hershman Leeson.

In September 2010, Brownstein revealed her latest project was the band Wild Flag, with Janet Weiss, Mary Timony, and Rebecca Cole, formerly of The Minders; according to Brownstein, about a year earlier, "I started to need music again, and so I called on my friends and we joined as a band. Chemistry cannot be manufactured or forced, so Wild Flag was not a sure thing, it was a 'maybe, a 'possibility.' But after a handful of practice sessions, spread out over a period of months, I think we all realized that we could be greater than the sum of our parts." They released a self-titled album in September 2011.

Music has always been my constant, my salvation. It's cliché to write that, but it's true. From dancing around to Michael Jackson and Madonna as a kid to having my mind blown by the first sounds of punk and indie rock, to getting to play my own songs and have people listen, music is what got me through. Over the years, music put a weapon in my hand and words in my mouth, it backed me up and shielded me, it shook me and scared me and showed me the way; music opened me up to living and being and feeling.

— Brownstein in October 2010

In 2011, Wild Flag toured for a second time and played at CMJ Music Marathon. By 2014, the band was no longer active.

==== Accolades ====
In 2006, Brownstein was the only woman to earn a spot in the Rolling Stone readers' list of the 25 "Most Underrated Guitarists of All-Time".

=== Writing ===
Brownstein began a writing career before Sleater-Kinney broke up. She interviewed Eddie Vedder, Mary Lynn Rajskub, Karen O, and Cheryl Hines for The Believer magazine. Brownstein has also written a couple of music-related video game reviews for Slate.

From November 2007 to May 2010, Brownstein wrote a weblog for NPR Music called "Monitor Mix"; she returned for a final post in October, thanking her readers and declaring the weblog "officially conclude[d]".

In March 2009, Brownstein was contracted to write a book to "describe the dramatically changing dynamic between music fan and performer, from the birth of the iPod and the death of the record store to the emergence of the 'you be the star' culture of American Idol and the ensuing dilution of rock mystique"; The book, called The Sound of Where You Are, was planned to be published by Ecco/HarperCollins. In an April 2012 interview on Marc Maron's WTF podcast, she said she was no longer working on the book.

Brownstein's memoir, Hunger Makes Me a Modern Girl, was released on October 27, 2015. The book was published by Riverhead Books, an imprint of Penguin Books USA.

In 2020, Ann Wilson, lead singer of hard rock band Heart, announced in an interview that Brownstein was writing the script for a Heart biographical film.

=== Acting ===
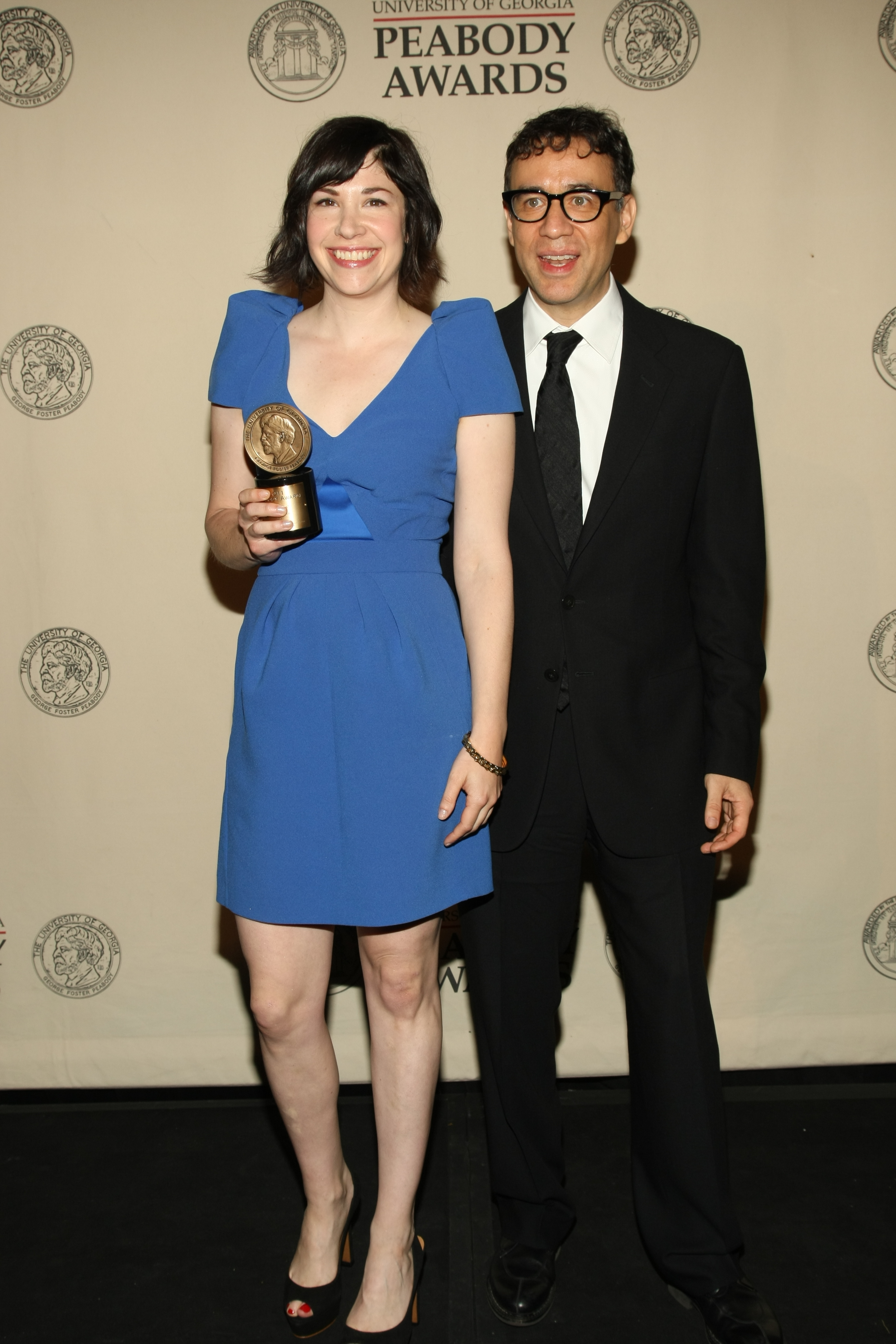
Brownstein and Fred Armisen attended the 2011 Peabody Awards. Their series Portlandia earned the award for Broadway Video and IFC.

Brownstein has acted (what she calls a "mere hobby") in the short film Fan Mail, the experimental feature Group, and the Miranda July film Getting Stronger Every Day. Brownstein and Fred Armisen published several video skits as part of a comedy duo called ThunderAnt. She starred opposite James Mercer of The Shins in the 2010 independent film Some Days Are Better Than Others. The film had its world premiere at SXSW on March 13, 2010.

After their ThunderAnt videos, Brownstein and Armisen developed Portlandia, a sketch comedy show shot on location in Portland, for the Independent Film Channel. The two starred in the series and wrote for it with co-creator Jonathan Krisel, a writer for Saturday Night Live. The show, which featured appearances of some of the characters from ThunderAnt, premiered in January 2011. The series received positive feedback and concluded after its eighth season in 2018.

From 2014 to 2019, Brownstein played the role of Syd in the Amazon Studios original series Transparent.

In 2015, Brownstein portrayed Genevieve Cantrell in the Todd Haynes film Carol, based on Patricia Highsmith's novel The Price of Salt. However, the majority of her scenes were cut due to the film's length. The film had its world premiere at the Cannes Film Festival on May 17, 2015. It began a limited release on November 20, 2015.

Brownstein was a guest on Saturday Night Live, Curb Your Enthusiasm, and Man Seeking Woman, among other shows.

Brownstein starred in and wrote the screenplay for The Nowhere Inn, a 2020 tour mockumentary thriller, with Annie Clark (St. Vincent).

==== Filmography ====
Year	Title	Role	Notes
2001	Getting Stronger Every Day	Various	Short film
2002	Group	Grace	
2003	Fan Mail	Jo	Short film
2007	Girls Rock	Herself	Documentary
2009	Light Tiger Eye	Woman	Short film
2010	Some Days Are Better Than Others	Katrina	
2011–2018	Portlandia	Various characters	77 episodes; also co-creator, co-executive producer, writer and director Peabody Award (2012); Writers Guild of America Award for Comedy/Variety (including talk) series (2013); Nominated—Primetime Emmy Award for Outstanding Writing for a Variety Series (2012–14; 2016); Nominated—Writers Guild of America Award for Comedy/Variety (including talk) series (2014); Nominated—Critics' Choice Award for Best Supporting Actress in a Comedy Series (2015)
2012	Vancouvria	Photo extra	Episode: "Big City Survival Class"
2012	The Simpsons	Emily (voice)	Episode: "The Day the Earth Stood Cool"
2012	Saturday Night Live	Cameo as herself	Episode: "Martin Short/Paul McCartney", "What Up with That?" sketch
2013	Saturday Night Live	Cameo as herself	Episode: "Ben Affleck/Kanye West", "It's a Lovely Day" sketch
2014–2015	Transparent	Syd Feldman	Recurring character Nominated—Screen Actors Guild Award for Outstanding Performance by an Ensemble in a Comedy Series (2015)
2015	Carol	Genevieve Cranell	
2015	Man Seeking Woman	Doctor at Chill Acres	Episode: "Branzino"
2015	Archer	Doctor Sklodowska (voice)	Episodes: "Drastic Voyage: Part 1" and "Drastic Voyage: Part 2"
2016	Saturday Night Live	Cameo as herself	Episode: "Fred Armisen/Courtney Barnett", "The Harkin Brothers" sketch
2016	The Realest Real	—N/a	Short film; director and writer
2017	Curb Your Enthusiasm	Mara	Episode: "Foisted!"
2018	Don't Worry, He Won't Get Far on Foot	Suzanne	
2018	Tag	Therapist	Uncredited
2018	The Oath	Alice Button	
2019	Mrs. Fletcher	—N/a	Director: "Parents' Weekend", "Invisible Fence"
2019–2021	Shrill	—N/a	Director: "Date", "Ribs", "Will"
2020	The Nowhere Inn	Herself	Also writer
2022	Minx	—N/a	Director: "Mary had a little hysterectomy"
2022	Irma Vep	Zelda	Miniseries
2022	Reboot	—N/a	Director: "New Girl"

== Personal life ==
Brownstein was outed as bisexual to her family and the world by Spin when she was 21 years old. The article discussed the fact that she had dated bandmate Corin Tucker in the beginning of Sleater-Kinney (the song "One More Hour" is about their break-up).

In 2006, The New York Times described Brownstein as "openly gay". In a November 2010 interview for Willamette Week, she stated that she identifies as bisexual. She says, "It's weird, because no one's actually ever asked me. People just always assume, like, you're this or that. It's like, 'OK. I'm bisexual. Just ask.'" Since, she has stated that she prefers/interchangeably uses the terms "queer" or "dyke" to bisexual. In a 2020 article, the Los Angeles Times noted that Brownstein and Annie Clark (who performs as St. Vincent) "dated years ago".

Since working together on ThunderAnt, Brownstein and Fred Armisen developed what Brownstein has called "one of the most intimate, functional, romantic, but nonsexual relationships [they have] ever had". According to Armisen, their relationship is "all of the things that I've ever wanted, you know, aside from like the physical stuff, but the intimacy that I have with her is like no other".

In 2022, Brownstein’s mother and stepfather were killed in a car accident while on vacation in Italy. Brownstein was informed of the incident by bandmate Corin Tucker. The accident, and Brownstein’s feelings of grief, shaped the band’s next record, Little Rope.

Brownstein is married, she confirmed on Pete Holmes's podcast You Made It Weird (Episode 1097, Sep. 9, 2026).

== See also ==
- List of LGBT people from Portland, Oregon
