= The Intellectual Life of the British Working Classes =

2001 book by Jonathan Rose

- Cover
- Author: Jonathan Rose
- Language: English
- Subject: British social history, Working-class education, Cultural history
- Genre: Non-fiction
- Publisher: Yale University Press
- Publication date: 2001
- Publication place: United States
- Pages: 534
- ISBN: 0-300-08886-8 (first edition)
- LC Class: 2020950215

The Intellectual Life of the British Working Classes is a 2001 historical study by Jonathan Rose, published by Yale University Press, that investigates the reading habits, educational pursuits, and cultural activities of British working-class people from the eighteenth century through the mid-twentieth century. Based on nearly two thousand working-class autobiographies, library records, social surveys, and institutional archives, Rose traces the rise and decline of the autodidact tradition—the pursuit of self-education among manual workers and clerks with limited access to formal schooling. Rose argues that canonical literature, rather than serving as an instrument of social control, often fostered intellectual independence and critical thinking among working-class readers who appropriated texts for their own purposes. The book documents the mutual improvement movement, the development of workers' libraries, the role of adult education institutions like the Workers' Educational Association and Ruskin College, and the tensions between working-class intellectual culture and literary modernism. The book received multiple awards including the Longman-History Today Book of the Year Prize and the Jacques Barzun Prize in Cultural History.

== Author and background ==
Rose is a historian who served as the founding president of the Society for the History of Authorship, Reading and Publishing and was a founding coeditor of the journal Book History. He is professor of history at Drew University. The book originated from his early graduate research when he wrote a paper investigating whether working people in Victorian Britain were reading classical literature. Though his initial paper was heavily criticized by his professor, Rose resolved to return to the subject, which took another 25 years to complete.

Rose initially intended to become a conventional intellectual historian to focus on canonical texts and thinkers. But the intellectual climate of the mid-1970s challenged these assumptions. He adopted methods from the "New Social History" movement to study the reading experiences of ordinary people, using sources that historians had not traditionally considered, including thousands of working-class memoirs, diaries, social surveys, letters to editors, and library records. Robert Baldock, former managing director of Yale University Press London, recognized the potential of Rose's work and supported its publication despite other publishers' reluctance to take on the project.

== Summary ==
Rose studies the reading habits, educational pursuits, and cultural experiences of British working-class people from approximately the eighteenth century through the mid-twentieth century. He focuses on the period from 1870 to 1950. Drawing on nearly two thousand published and unpublished working-class autobiographies, supplemented by social surveys, library borrowing records, school registers, Mass Observation archives, and oral histories, the work traces the rise and eventual decline of the autodidact tradition—the pursuit of self-education among manual workers and lower-middle-class clerks who had limited access to formal education.

The book challenges prevailing assumptions about working-class reading by demonstrating that canonical literature, rather than serving as an instrument of social control or bourgeois hegemony, frequently sparked intellectual independence and critical thinking among working-class readers. Rose documents how workers appropriated texts from Shakespeare to Marx for their own purposes, often developing interpretations that differed markedly from those intended by authors or promoted by educational authorities. The narrative reveals surprising patterns in working-class literary taste, including a preference for classical and Victorian authors over contemporary literature, and documents how readers from diverse backgrounds—Scottish weavers, Welsh miners, London clerks, Lancashire mill workers—created what amounted to a parallel intellectual culture operating alongside but distinct from middle-class literary life.

Rose's analysis pivots on the mutual improvement movement, a vast network of voluntary educational initiatives that Rose identifies as fundamental to the Labour movement's development. These societies, which could range from informal kitchen gatherings to organized institutes with libraries and lecture programs, provided forums for collective learning where hierarchical teacher-student relationships were abolished in favor of cooperative education. The book traces this tradition from its eighteenth-century Scottish origins through its proliferation across industrial Britain, documenting how it produced numerous political leaders, journalists, and educators while fostering a distinctive working-class intellectual culture that valued both individual cultivation and collective advancement.

Contrary to historical narratives emphasizing the oppressive nature of Board schools, Rose presents evidence from student memoirs and surveys suggesting that many working-class children and families valued their educational experiences, despite acknowledging the schools' limitations. The book examines adult education movements in detail, especially the Workers' Educational Association and Ruskin College, documenting both the ideological tensions within these institutions—exemplified by the 1909 Ruskin strike—and their role in producing Labour Party leaders and activists who would shape twentieth-century British politics.

A significant portion of the book addresses the complex relationship between working-class autodidacts and various political ideologies. Rose argues that Marxism's failure to attract mass working-class support in Britain stemmed partly from cultural factors: workers found Marxist texts inaccessible and Marxist activists condescending toward the English literary canon that autodidacts cherished. The ethical socialism of the Labour Party, with its roots in Nonconformist Christianity and romantic literature, proved more compatible with autodidact culture than scientific Marxism's materialist doctrine.

Funded by small weekly contributions from miners' wages, the Welsh miners' libraries assembled collections rivaling those of major universities and fostered an intellectual culture in the South Wales coalfields that persisted until the coal industry's decline. Rose treats these institutions as prime exemplars of working-class cultural institution-building, presenting detailed analysis of borrowing records that reveal miners' reading preferences and documenting how the libraries supported both political education and broader cultural interests.

Rose's final chapters turn to encounters between working-class intellectuals and literary modernism. He frames this through what he calls the "Leonard Bast question": How accurately did middle-class authors portray working-class readers? Through collective biography of actual clerks and office workers, Rose challenges stereotypes perpetuated by writers like E.M. Forster and Virginia Woolf. He reveals instead a vibrant intellectual life among lower-middle-class workers—workers who often commanded larger readerships and earnings than their modernist critics. Rose documents two competing intelligentsias. One was university-educated and modernist. The other was rooted in Board school education and self-improvement, producing popular journalism and bestselling fiction while modernists depended on patronage.

Rose attributes the decline of autodidact culture after 1945 to multiple convergent factors. The expansion of secondary and higher education provided formal routes to learning. Industrial employment gave way to service work. Modernism became institutionalized in universities and cultural establishments. Mass media offered new forms of entertainment. Rose traces how modernist culture, initially confined to elite audiences, became mainstream through state patronage and educational expansion. Meanwhile, the middlebrow culture that had sustained autodidacts lost its audience. The book closes with reflection on this cultural shift's implications. Rose suggests that the disappearance of the autodidact tradition represented a loss of working-class agency in defining cultural value and intellectual worth.

== Critics ==
In his review for the London Review of Books, Stefan Collini noted that while Rose wrote with "plain-manishness" reminiscent of Orwell and Carey, his hostility to modernism as "a snobbish conspiracy" oversimplified complex cultural dynamics. Collini questioned Rose's elegiac conclusion that autodidacts "disappeared with the factories that employed them," arguing this allowed "synecdoche to stand in for explanation" without adequately analyzing what tradition had ended and what might have replaced it. He observed that if autodidact culture had truly ended, we must reconsider "what it was a tradition of and what, if anything, has replaced it in 'the intellectual life of the British working class.'"

Miriam Bailin considered the book as an influential study that studies working-class readers as a specific demographic group. Bailin mentioned that Rose declared autobiographies to be "the most useful sources" for accessing "the minds of ordinary readers in history, to discover what they read and how they read it." She highlighted the book's methodological impact on subsequent scholarship, such as Andrew Murphy's work on Shakespeare and working-class readers. Murphy followed Rose's lead by studying about 150 autobiographical texts to reconstruct actual reading experiences. To Bailin, Rose's approach represented a shift toward using first-person accounts rather than fictional representations or theoretical speculation to understand how ordinary people engaged with literature. His focus on autobiographical evidence established a method for historians to investigate the reading practices of those whose experiences were rarely documented in official literary discourse. Bailin positioned the book as foundational for scholars seeking to recover the voices and experiences of working-class readers in Victorian Britain.

Sam Bidwell praised the book for documenting how British working-class families once pursued self-education through literature and art. Bidwell argued Britain should trust working-class children's ability to engage with complex culture, restore ambitious curriculums, bus students to authentic performances, and revive grammar schools.

The Bristol Radical History Group lauded Rose for documenting how British working classes pursued self-education through books, music, and art from pre-industrial times to the twentieth century. The reviewer wrote: "Rose cannot be praised enough."

In his review for Socialism Today, Michael Calderbank praised Rose's research into hidden stories—weavers reading Milton at mills, domestic servants studying Proust despite employers' complaints. Yet he criticized what considered Rose's liberal bias and his claim that classics "unambiguously emancipated" working-class readers. To Calderbank, Rose dismissed both Marxism and literary modernism as elitist obstacles to workers' education. Despite these remarks, Calderbank found the work valuable for documenting workers' persistent efforts to access cultural and intellectual life despite systematic exclusion.

William Baker criticized Rose's selective evidence. Baker noticed that the author quoted Alexander Baron out of context to support claims about working-class conservatism while omitting Harold Pinter, whose avant-garde influences complicated Rose's thesis. To Baker, the book relied on testimonies from those who escaped their working-class origins rather than those who remained. Baker pointed out to what he considered Rose's failure to address post-1945 educational expansion through polytechnics and the Open University, which created frustrated graduates without improved job prospects. Despite these remarks, Baker wrote: "Rose is to be congratulated on raising such issues. His is certainly a thought provoking text. He has read widely and deeply in many differing strands of British culture."

Christine Pawley praised Rose for dismantling stereotypes about working-class readers as an "inarticulate mass." Pawley's grandfather, born into an English farm-laboring family in 1869, owned Shakespeare, Dickens, encyclopedias, and poetry collections. However, she thought that Rose's subjects were not representative—many became professors, writers, broadcasters, and politicians who escaped their origins. Pawley challenged Rose's theoretical framework. She argued that American middle-class readers showed identical eclecticism when she studied late nineteenth-century Iowa library patrons. Working-class and middle-class readers alike mixed "high" and "low" culture, crossed gender boundaries in their reading choices, and defied demographic categories. Pawley also questioned whether Rose's finding of "promiscuous" reading resulted from poverty or reflected broader patterns that transcended class.

Stuart MacIntyre identified key paradoxes in Rose's approach. While Rose insisted texts carried no fixed meaning and readers appropriated canonical works for their own purposes, he treated working-class memoirs as transparent evidence of reading habits. MacIntyre attacked Rose's scissors-and-paste technique that assembled sources without regard for provenance, context, or genre. He cited specific misrepresentations: James Bonwick's spiritual autobiography was quoted selectively to support arguments about sexual ignorance and education; Frank Chapple testified against Communists without acknowledgment of his vested interests; Jack Jones's path from Communist to Mosley's New Party went unmentioned. MacIntyre questioned Rose's polemical asides against the Modern Literary Association and his defense of working-class preferences for Jane Austen's "roseate country-house sketches." The book concluded that modernist elites abandoned autodidacts who disappeared with the factories that employed them. MacIntyre's final judgment was blunt: Rose claimed "Cool Britannia, it seems, does not read," but his tendentious use of evidence undermined his conclusions about working-class intellectual life.

John Callaghan praised Rose's documentation of institutional infrastructure: mutual improvement societies, adult schools, libraries, reading circles, musical societies, Nonconformist sects, Sunday schools, public readings that drew thousands, and cheap classics from Everyman. Callaghan acknowledged the representativeness problem but cited evidence—a 1918 Sheffield survey found one in six men and one in eight women formed the working-class intelligentsia. Welsh miners' libraries held 3,000 books on average; Tredegar Workmen's Institute circulated 100,000 volumes annually by 1940. Brass bands numbered 2,600 nationwide. Callaghan thought Rose lost momentum approaching World War II and ended pessimistically, but had demonstrated that ordinary people refused to surrender in face of barriers denying them intellectual life.

In his review, Denis Paz questioned whether working-class memoirs provided reliable evidence—the passage of years affected memoirists' judgments about which books truly mattered to them as young readers. Rose himself acknowledged that autobiographers sometimes romanticized their pasts or grew bitter with age, making it difficult for historians to distinguish genuine childhood opinions from retrospective interpretations. Rose blamed the decline of autodidact culture on modernism's "corrosive hostility toward the common reader." Authors like T.S. Eliot, Virginia Woolf, Wyndham Lewis, and D.H. Lawrence deliberately created literature made "too difficult for a general audience" and strove to preserve class superiority by reviling the mean suburban man. Paz noted that Rose's account inevitably privileged memoirs from those successful enough to write them—workers who moved beyond penny bloods into lower-middle-class or white-collar jobs—rather than those who never developed literary habits sufficient to document their reading lives.

Eunice de Souza considered the book as an essential reading that challenges prevailing academic orthodoxies about literature and class. For de Souza, Rose demonstrates that working-class readers passionately embraced canonical literature rather than being alienated by it. de Souza traced the shift from religious to secular reading among non-conformists. She mentioned how "reverence transferred from the Good Book to the Great Books." de Souza detailed the history of cheap classics publishing—from W.T. Stead's Penny Poets to J.M. Dent's Everyman's Library, whose founder was himself a working-class autodidact who discovered Johnson through a mutual improvement society. Rose demolished attacks on Matthew Arnold's liberal education as a plot to depoliticize workers. Autodidacts wanted the canon precisely because they recognized, as Rose argued, that "if the classics offered artistic excellence, psychological insights, and penetrating philosophy to the governing classes...then the politics of equality must begin by redistributing this knowledge to the governed classes." De Souza called the book "a classic in its own right" and "a transforming experience."

Frank Emmett found Rose's chapter on Welsh Miners' Institutes the strongest, where Rose synthesized statistics and anecdotes to document cultural institutions built by working people. Rose traced the Tredegar Institute's decline from circulating 100,000 volumes in 1940 to its breakup in 1964, mourning the loss of its "magnificent collection" like a working-class Alexandria. Problems emerged in less focused chapters. "Cultural Literacy in the Classic Slum" conflated diverse contexts—Sheffield 1918, the Jewish East End, nineteenth-century Lancashire—without unifying purpose. Emmett questioned Rose's claim that texts were tabula rasa for value-transmission and caught inconsistencies about Joyce's accessibility. He tested Rose's selectivity through Samuel Bamford's case—Rose portrayed him as a radical autodidact inspired by Milton, but omitted Bamford's conservative turn, bitterness about lost family property, and distrust by radical workers. This revealed how different "frames" produced different conclusions. Emmett also criticized the absence of a bibliography, which he thought complicated source verification. Despite his remarks, he believed that Rose's democratic impulse to voice the voiceless made the book "noble and illuminating."

In his review of the book alongside David Nasaw's biography of William Randolph Hearst, Joel H. Wiener contrasted Hearst's sensationalist "yellow journalism" with British autodidacts' engagement with canonical literature. Wiener described the book as presenting the working-class struggle for intellectual autonomy against elite efforts at cultural control. He welcomed Rose's demonstration of how autodidacts used canonical literature for their own purposes rather than accepting prescribed interpretations. Wiener also praised Rose's evidence that self-improving attitudes pervaded the working classes—Durham miners, Cumberland tailors, Newlyn fishermen, Scottish farm laborers, Lancashire millworkers all immersed themselves in literature, though their interpretations differed.

John Horne praised the documentation of how working-class readers found cultural power through literature. Horne thought that Rose brilliantly argued and beautifully written book taught important lessons about the role of libraries in society.

Paul Sturges emphasized the book's polyphony of voices from domestic servants, weavers, wheelwrights, coal miners, factory hands, farm laborers, and shepherds. He considered the book essential for understanding libraries' social role.

In his review of the book for The Political Quarterly, Bernard Crick declared the book "an absolute masterpiece of social history that dispels many political myths." Rose discovered what working-class readers actually read—penny dreadfuls, classics, public school stories, Shakespeare, imperialist and socialist propaganda, and the Bible. Aneurin Bevan's atheist speeches remained saturated with biblical phrases like "towards the New Jerusalem." Rose conducted a mammoth trawl through memoirs, letters, library registers, and borrowing lists. Working-class activists' reading habits matched the middle class. Socialists weren't corrupted by Billy Bunter stories, and few read Marx. Rose defended literature against ideology, noting even Stalin didn't remove Russian classics from Soviet libraries. Will Crooks spent tuppence on a secondhand Iliad and felt transported to an enchanted land. Rose mocked postmodernists who claimed Homer and Shakespeare were irrelevant to workers. Crick concluded that modern culture forfeited important self-knowledge when the autodidact tradition withered, losing working-class observers who saw clearly where culture was heading.

Mark Sampson called the book "less a sociological opus and more a cri de coeur for classic literature itself." He praised Rose for attacking academics who dismiss Great Books and for demonstrating through extensive research that working-class readers—miners, millgirls, clerks, factory workers—read canonical literature with nuance and sophistication, not as passive vessels absorbing elite prejudices. He singled out "Alienation from Marxism" as the book's best chapter, where Rose showed how reading classics helped workers think independently and resist ideological manipulation. Rose argued that Marxists "deliberately excluded" workers through impenetrable language, making Marxism inherently a movement of educated rather than laboring classes. Sampson identified weaknesses: Rose sometimes portrayed working-class readers as naive (unable to distinguish fact from fiction in early novels), and too readily dismissed the effects of imperialist literature on readers. Rose's conservatism occasionally "got the better of him." Despite these criticisms, Sampson endorsed Rose's core message about the inherent value of solitary, individualized, unideological intellectual pursuits—describing intellectual life as "a garden within himself that he tends to" and calling it "a much-needed palliative" against arguments that deny the value of Great Books.

Kate Flint considered the book "a compelling testimony to the power of the written word to transform individuals' lives." While noting Rose's "grouchy attitude" toward academic literary study and his swipes at canon wars and deconstruction, Flint saw this as consistent with his disdain for elitism and obfuscatory vocabulary. The autodidact emerges as the hero of Rose's study—working-class readers who, despite environmental, educational, and financial obstacles, managed to sustain independence of thought and grow to respect their own authority.

Australian historian Ross McKibbin acknowledged the book's impressive documentation while fundamentally challenging Rose's interpretation that canonical literature led to intellectual freedom. McKibbin argued that Rose failed to examine what autodidacts actually achieved politically, noting that autodidact-led Labour governments accomplished less for workers than the middle-class-dominated Attlee government: "their 'ideas' could never compete with the 'ideas' of the ruling class." He suggested Rose's regret for autodidact culture's passing reflected nostalgia for a canonical notion of literature rather than genuine working-class emancipation.

In his review for the Guardian, Ian Sansom described the book as "an astonishing read" documenting how working-class ancestors "read classic literature, go to concerts and the theatre, learn to play musical instruments, join libraries, set up mutual improvement societies." Sansom positioned the work as a companion to John Carey's "The Intellectuals and the Masses," telling the other side of the story—"The Masses and the Intellectuals." He criticized Rose's inclusion of "class" in the title, suggesting it would deter readers in an age of meritocracy, and proposed it should be called "What It Was We Did Before We All Watched Telly." For Sansom, people who assume "working class" means "stupid" or "lazy" should read Rose's book, "but most of them are probably too busy working in TV, or on newspaper colour supplements, or writing fancy books that nobody wants to read."

David Levine, in a combined review examining Rose's book alongside other works on memory and social history, described it as "a splendid book" that makes "a magisterial contribution to educational history." Levine praised Rose's extensive research across nearly two thousand autobiographies, noting that the work "stands astride the borders between literary history, popular culture, educational history, and the history of reading." He emphasized how Rose's evidence contradicts traditional "social control" models of educational history by showing how working-class students' passion for learning served to undermine rather than reinforce administrators' attempts at moral regulation. Levine found the book "both challenging and a delight to read," welcoming Rose's demonstration that working-class readers "saw much more to 'classics' like Shakespeare and Dickens than their social superiors thought" and were "willing to sacrifice both time and money in the pursuit of knowledge and freedom." However, Levine also reflected on methodological questions about the nature of memory and representation in historical research, noting that while Rose's "representative portraits" reveal collective patterns, they necessarily sacrifice individual particularity in favor of group experiences assembled into "describing mentalities and representative lived experiences."

Daniel Akst commended Rose for producing "a mountain of evidence" that classics were not only well-read by British coal miners and mill workers but actually radicalized them—"canonical literature tended to ignite insurrections in the minds of the workers." Akst highlighted the "heroic pursuit of learning in the face of all obstacles"—from 16th-century government edicts preventing workers from reading the Bible to Francis Place losing upper-class customers when they discovered his thousand-book library. Shepherds in the Cheviot Hills maintained circulating libraries by leaving books in boundary wall crannies. Despite loneliness and family tensions, autodidacts formed subscription libraries and mutual-improvement associations. Akst found the book resonated personally with his own haphazard literary education. He thought that Rose "has given them something new and important to read" about literature, democracy, and equality.

Philip Waller described it as "an important book that will shake up several faculties of English literature and not a few departments of modern history." While praising Rose's passion and the vivid picture painted through extensive quotation, Waller noted the work's structural messiness and tendency to overstate claims against previous scholars. He observed that "not all historians have ignored or underestimated the importance of working-class mutual improvement societies" as Rose claimed. Waller criticized Rose for sometimes straining evidence to prove other academics wrong, particularly his unfair attack on Ross McKibbin for not mentioning events like the Nazi-Soviet Pact when McKibbin was examining the pre-1918 labor movement. He noted that points about Samuel Smiles's radicalism weren't new discoveries, and not all historians had ignored working-class mutual improvement societies and libraries. Despite his criticism, Waller called it "a cornucopia of a book" covering remarkable range where "no scholar who delves into it will fail to find a reward."

Sally Mitchell praised the work as a historical scholarship that took an opposite approach to theory-based literary criticism. Mitchell highlighted Rose's central critique of the "receptive fallacy"—the practice of analyzing texts rather than actual readers to determine how literature shaped audiences—and commended his rigorous methodology, even as she acknowledged limitations such as the underrepresentation of women and the bias toward more articulate memoir writers. Mitchell found "something to think about on virtually every page," and cited Rose's revelations about working-class reading preferences, resistant reading practices, and the time lag between middle-class and working-class literary tastes. She identified the book as exemplifying "the most important scholarly books"—those that left questions open and pointed the way to new research, calling it essential reading despite its "overheated" polemics.

Chris Baggs described the book as a much-acclaimed and award-winning work that deserved attention in library science because it demonstrated the emancipatory power of books and reading. While Baggs acknowledged that Rose occasionally over-reached by drawing sweeping conclusions from limited evidence, he praised the book's thoroughness, accessible writing style, and willingness to confront theoretical positions like Marxism and postmodernism head-on. Baggs liked the frequent references to libraries throughout the book, calling them "strong testimony to the very significant part these often unsung institutions have played in the cultural life of the British Isles." Despite noting over-statements, Baggs declared it "a must-read study" with "outstanding" overall quality, though he characterized it as "a success story with a downbeat ending" since the transformative encounters with books had been lost after 1945.

In her review, Shelina Visram described how Rose traced the intellectual self-education of British working-class people from before the Industrial Revolution through the mid-20th century. Though Visram found the book's tone sometimes romantic, she praised Rose for challenging assumptions about working-class cultural life and giving voice to those previously dismissed, ultimately viewing the decline of the autodidact tradition as what Rose called "a great loss" for both the working classes and society.

Michael Childs described the book as an ambitious survey of British working-class literacy from the early eighteenth century to the 1960s that analyzed not just what workers read but how they read it. Childs praised Rose's accessible structure and his challenge to hegemonic interpretations that assumed texts conveyed fixed meanings to passive readers. However, he thought Rose avoided socioeconomic explanations and showed less sympathy toward modernist authors than toward his working-class subjects. Childs found Rose's depiction of critics as closed-minded versus workers as open somewhat overdrawn, but acknowledged Rose excellently resurrected the autodidact culture that had largely disappeared by the late twentieth century.

Amy C. Whipple observed that Rose wrote "with clear affection for the autodidact tradition that he uncovers among the working classes, and he somewhat mournfully concludes with its decline." Whipple found his explanation of autodidacts being made redundant by educational expansion, "like a traditional craftsman made redundant by new technology," particularly effective. She lauded Rose's attention to how working-class readers actively reinterpreted imperialist ideologies in boys' papers.

Martyn Lyons emphasized the book's contribution to international scholarship on reading history while noting its specifically British focus limited comparative analysis. Lyons praised Rose's detailed reconstruction of working-class library use and reading preferences. He found the treatment of gender differences in autodidact culture particularly valuable for understanding broader patterns of educational exclusion.

Martin Ryle described the work as invaluable for anyone interested in cultural education's history and politics, praising Rose's synthesis of diverse sources from Mass Observation to oral histories. Ryle appreciated Rose's demonstration that BBC classical programming "was lavishly praised in the memoirs … of working people," countering dismissals of Reithian elitism. He noted the organic connection Rose drew between cultural history and social democracy, with fourteen members of the 1945 Labour Cabinet having WEA connections.

Elliot Murphy appreciated Rose's exposé of how "Latin tags, professional vocabularies, and postmodernist jargon have all been used in turn as forms of encryption, permitting communication among elites while shutting out everyone else." Murphy valued the historical perspective on educational skepticism, noting Thompson's observation that workers saw education as "a cure for all ills" with misplaced faith. He considered Rose's treatment of mutual improvement societies' role in labour movement formation significant.

Shantanu Majee focused on Rose's documentation of colonial and postcolonial dimensions of working-class reading, particularly autodidacts' engagement with imperial literature. Majee mentioned how working-class readers often subverted intended imperial messages through resistant reading practices.

Tom Holland praised the book's "lively and massively documented study" that promised to address questions long thought unanswerable due to supposed lack of evidence. Holland found the final chapters on modernist-autodidact encounters most successful. He welcomed how Rose brought "voices of actual working and clerking readers and writers back into the debate." He suggested Rose's treatment of middle-class stereotypes was more complex than simple correction: "His focus isn't on the representatives of a dominant cultural class, but on the constituency ignored by most accounts of modernism."

American literary theorist J.O. Baylen characterized the work as demonstrating the vitality of working-class intellectual life against persistent stereotypes. The reviewer emphasized Rose's effective challenge to academic assumptions about popular culture's passive consumption.

In his combined review, Jonathan Payne explored connections between working-class education and broader patterns of economic development, pointing out to Rose's documentation of how literacy requirements changed with industrialization. Payne praised Rose for avoiding simplistic explanations of how educational expansion eroded autodidact culture.

== Awards ==
=== Won ===
- 2002 Longman-History Today Historical Book of the Year Prize
- 2001 American Philosophical Society Jacques Barzun Prize in Cultural History
- 2002 British Council Prize of the North American Conference on British Studies
- 2002 SHARP Book History Prize
- Bela Kornitzer Book Awards
- Named a Book of the Year by The Economist in 2001.

=== Shorlisted ===
- Shortlisted for the 2001 Duff Cooper Prize
- Longlisted for the 2001 Samuel Johnson Prize

=== Yale University Press's 50th anniversary ===
In 2023, Yale University Press London selected the book as one of fifty landmark titles in its "50 Years in 50 Books" series, celebrating the press's 50th anniversary of publishing in London (1973–2023). The selection honored the most significant books published during Yale London's five decades of operation. To mark the anniversary, Rose contributed a reflective essay to the Yale Books Blog in October 2023, discussing the book's origins, its impact on the field of reading history, and its continuing relevance to contemporary debates about self-education and intellectual freedom. Rose mentioned that while he had initially believed the autodidact tradition died after 1945, he now recognizes it continues in modern forms such as book clubs and online educational communities.

== Translations ==
A Czech translation of excerpts from the book appeared in the anthology Co jsou dějiny knihy? Antologie textů k dějinám a teorii knižní kultury, edited by Jiřina Šmejkalová and published by Academia. Portions of the work were translated into Spanish and published in the Argentine journal Prismas in July-December 2022.
