= At the Edge of Conquest: The Journey of Chief Wai-Wai =

1992 film

- Directed by: Geoffrey O'Connor
- Production company: Realis Pictures
- Distributed by: Filmmakers Library
- Release date: 1992
- Countries: Canada; United States
- Language: English

At the Edge of Conquest: The Journey of Chief Wai-Wai is a 1992 American-Canadian short documentary film directed by Geoffrey O'Connor. It was nominated for an Academy Award for Best Documentary Short at the 65th Academy Awards.
