= We're Not Talking =

Studio album by the Goon Sax
- Released: 14 September 2018
- Genres: Indie pop; rock
- Length: 29:53
- Labels: Chapter Music; Wichita

The Goon Sax chronology
Up to Anything (2016)	We're Not Talking (2018)	Mirror II (2021)

Singles from We're Not Talking
- 1. "She Knows" Released: 2 May 2018; 2. "Make Time 4 Love" Released: 17 July 2018; 3. "We Can't Win" Released: 23 August 2018

Professional ratings
Aggregate scores
Source	Rating
AnyDecentMusic?	7.6/10
Metacritic	80/100
Review scores
Source	Rating
AllMusic	4/5 stars
Clash	7/10
DIY	4/5 stars
Dork	4/5 stars
Exclaim!	7/10
Loud and Quiet	9/10
Paste	8.4/10
Pitchfork	7.2/10
Under the Radar	7.5/10

We're Not Talking is the second studio album by Australian indie pop band the Goon Sax. It was released on 14 September 2018, by Chapter Music in Australia and New Zealand, and Wichita Recordings worldwide.

== Release ==
On 1 May 2018, the Goon Sax announced the release of their second album, along with the single "She Knows". Band member James Harrison explained the single "I hope it makes people energetic and excited to listen to, it’s a song about losing hope, stubbornness and heartache. I’m not sure if it’s our saddest song, but maybe if you lock yourself in your room for a couple of days and only listen to it you might not feel so happy". The music video was released on 30 May 2018, and directed by Tia Wolf.

The music video for the opening track on the album, "Make Time 4 Love" was released on 17 July 2018. The song was featured on Under the Radar's Top 10 Songs of the Week on 20 July 2018.

The third single "We Can't Win" was released on 23 August 2018.

On 20 February 2020, the music video to "Strange Light" was released.

== Critical reception ==
We're Not Talking was met with "generally favorable" reviews from critics. At Metacritic, which assigns a weighted average rating out of 100 to reviews from mainstream publications, this release received an average score of 80 based on 13 reviews. Aggregator Album of the Year gave the release a 79 out of 100 based on a critical consensus of 14 reviews.

Tim Sendra of AllMusic explained how the band spent time touring the world, whilst gaining experience to making a "more mature second record". He also noted: "The songs are bright and bold, the strings swoop in occasionally to lift the songs into the skies, and there's a refreshing lightness to everything that makes the still-somewhat-difficult nature of the subject matter go down more easily. They managed to build up and expand up their sound without losing the core of what made them special." Clash gave the album a seven out of ten, saying "Something that immediately grabs you about this record is the production, which easily elevates it above its more naive sounding predecessor; the sound of new label Wichita making good on their investment. Stephen Ackroyd of Dork gave the album 4 out of 5 stars, explaining: "Sweeping and swooning with the spirit of indie past, but never descending into generic laziness, The Goon Sax are the next wonders from Down Under. Anna Alger of Exclaim! gave the album a seven out of date noted how the band have had a "graceful ascent into adulthood", while explaining "It is jangly and playful, while offering sobering portraits of reflections on navigating relationships in all their complexity."

=== Accolades ===
Accolades for We're Not Talking
Publication	Accolade	Rank
Loud and Quiet	Loud and Quiet's Top 40 Albums of 2018	34
Under the Radar	Under the Radar's Top 100 Albums of 2018	92

== Track listing ==
We're Not Talking track listing
No.	Title	Length
1.	"Make Time 4 Love"	2:09
2.	"Love Lost"	3:05
3.	"She Knows"	2:32
4.	"Losing Myself"	2:45
5.	"Somewhere in Between"	1:02
6.	"Strange Light"	3:22
7.	"Sleep EZ"	3:02
8.	"We Can't Win"	3:15
9.	"A Few Times Too Many"	2:59
10.	"Now You Pretend"	1:18
11.	"Get Out"	2:19
12.	"Til the End"	2:05
Total length:		29:53

== Personnel ==
Band members

- Louis Forster – bass, guitar, vocals
- Riley Jones – percussion, vocals
- James Harrison – bass, vocals

Additional musicians

- Biddy Connor – viola
- Madison Foley – trumpet
- Lizzie Welsh – violin

Production

- Cameron Bird – producer
- James Cecil – engineer, mixing, producer
- Tex Houston – mastering
- Connor Beazley – photography
