= Scott & Charlene's Wedding =

Australian musical group

- Origin: Melbourne, Australia
- Genres: Indie rock, indie pop, dolewave
- Years active: 2006–present
- Labels: Fire Records; Bedroom Suck Records; Critical Heights; Untapped Resources
- Members: Craig Dermody; Jack Farley; Joe Alexander
- Past members: Michael Caterer; Michael Mimoun; Ian Savage; Dion Nania; Karla Way; Antonia Sellbach; Luke Horton; Jarrod Quarrel; Gill Tucker; Esther Edquist
- Website: scottandcharleneswedding.bandcamp.com

Scott & Charlene's Wedding are an Australian indie rock band, formed in Melbourne in 2006. The band currently consists of vocalist and guitarist Craig Dermody, bassist Jack Farley and drummer Joe Alexander. Dermody is also the principal songwriter and founder, and by 2013, the band had undergone numerous line-up changes with "30 or 40 people in total" having joined.

The band's name is taken from the 1987 wedding between Scott Robinson and Charlene Mitchell (played by Jason Donovan and Kylie Minogue, respectively) on the Australian soap opera Neighbours. Dermody stated: "I remember sitting down and watching it with my mum. ... I remember the wedding being massive, it was as if it was a real wedding. Like a royal wedding, but in Australia." When asked if he actually liked the show, Dermody responded, "No, I hate Neighbours. It was just for a bogan reference. I used to watch it with my mum when I was young so it reminds me of Adelaide".

== History ==
The band were formed in 2006 in Melbourne by Craig Dermody, who had been a member of various bands including Lindsey Low Hand, Spider Vomit and Divorced with whom he had released albums on various independent Australian labels. Dermody self-released the band's debut album in 2010 Para Vista Social Club on vinyl only, via his own label Untapped Resources. It was recorded with guitarist Luke Horton, bassist Jarrod Quarrel and drummer Dion Nania who usually played guitar with Melbourne band Panel of Judges. The album was released as a limited edition of 200 copies in second-hand album covers which he painted over by hand. The song Epping Line "is about hearing news of my mother passing away. Those big moments are important as song subjects and the songs are important to help me get through those big moments".

In 2010, Dermody relocated from Melbourne to Williamsburg, Brooklyn, revealing that he "was just after a bit of a life change. I'd just done what I was doing, and it was just time for me to go there, I guess – I'd always wanted to". The following year the album was released internationally by London-based label Critical Heights and re-issued in Australia on Bedroom Suck Records. Dermody admitted that "the fact that it has been re-issued is pleasant surprise to me" and that "at the time my painting career was going a lot better than my music career".

Whilst based in Williamsburg, he formed a new lineup of the band but admitted that he found it difficult to find band members at first or to get gig bookings. Former drummer Dion Nania re-located with Dermody and moved back on to guitar, bassist Karla Way from Beaches and guitarist Antonia Sellbach from Love of Diagrams and Beaches were also recruited. The band recorded the Two Weeks EP, which was released in early 2013 on 10" vinyl via Critical Heights.

In 2013, the band signed to Fire Records after the label heard them through their Bandcamp page, and released second album Any Port In A Storm. The album was recorded with another lineup of the band featuring guitarist Michael Caterer, drummer Michael Mimoun and bassist Ian Savage. Written and recorded whilst in New York City, Dermody stated that "most of the inspiration came from my pretty standard places, girls, crap jobs and the place that I was living in". The band toured the album worldwide, with longterm friend and producer Jack Farlay on bass.

In September 2014, the band released the cassette only mini-album Back On The Tools, and the following year released the Australian-only EP Delivered (later issued worldwide via Fire Records in 2016).

In October 2016, the band released their third album Mid Thirties Single Scene. Commenting on writing the album, Dermody revealed that "I've been writing a lot about stuff happening in life at the moment, moving back to Melbourne and trying to adjust to all of that. My father passed away during the period of writing so that's in there and girls, girls are in there". Now back in Melbourne, the band consists of long-time friends and former band members, bassist Jack Farley, guitarist/backing vocalist Gill Tucker, drummer Joe Alexander (also owner of Bedroom Suck Records) and occasionally keyboardist/backing vocalist Esther Edquist. The band embarked on a world tour, taking in the UK, mainland Europe and Japan. Tucker left the band in June 2017.

== Members ==
Current members

- Craig Dermody – lead vocals, guitar
- Ella Styles – guitar, vocals
- Jack Farley – bass
- Joe Alexander – drums

Former members

- Michael Caterer – guitar
- Michael Mimoun – drums
- Ian Savage – bass
- Dion Nania – guitar/drums
- Karla Way – bass
- Antonia Sellbach – guitar
- Luke Horton – guitar
- Jarrod Quarrel – bass
- Gill Tucker – guitar, backing vocals
- Esther Edquist – keyboards, backing vocals

== Discography ==
=== Albums ===
- Para Vista Social Club (2010)
- Any Port In A Storm (2013)
- Mid Thirties Single Scene (2016)

=== EPs/Mini-Albums ===
- Two Weeks (2013)
- Back On The Tools (2014)
- Delivered (2015)
- When in Rome, Carpe Diem (2019)
