= The Goon Sax =

Australian indie pop band

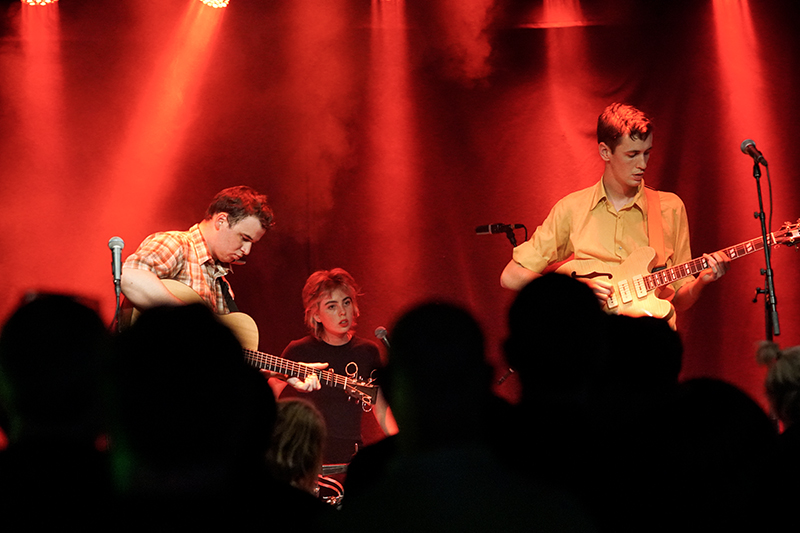
- The Goon Sax performing at the Aarhus Volume Festival in Denmark, 2017

Background information
- Origin: Brisbane, Australia
- Genres: Indie pop; twee pop; dolewave
- Years active: 2013–2022
- Label: Chapter Music
- Past members: Riley Jones; Louis Forster; James Harrison

The Goon Sax was an Australian indie pop trio from Brisbane. Formed in 2013, the band consisted of Riley Jones (vocals, drums, lead guitar), Louis Forster (vocals, rhythm guitar, bass) and James Harrison (bass, rhythm guitar, backing vocals). The band were joined by touring musician Alistair Taylor (lead guitar, keyboards, drums) for live performances. Forster is the son of Robert Forster, co-founder of indie rock band the Go-Betweens. The band released their debut studio album, Up to Anything, in 2016 on the Chapter Music label. This was followed by We're Not Talking in 2018, and Mirror II in 2021. They have performed with Twerps, Blank Realm, U.S. Girls, and Crayon Fields, among other artists.

The band's name is a play on words combining the Australian vernacular for boxed wine, a 'goon sack', with the musical instrument the saxophone.

== History ==
Forster and Harrison started the Goon Sax when they were still in high school. The two began by collaborating on songs together in Harrison's bedroom. In March 2014, Jones joined the band after taking drum lessons for a month. In September 2015, Chapter Music released their debut single, "Sometimes Accidentally," followed by their second, "Boyfriend," two months later. In early 2016, the band played at Laneway Festival in Brisbane. On 8 April 2016, they released their debut studio album Up to Anything. They went on their final tour as the opening act for Snail Mail in the US and UK in 2022.

The band announced their break-up via their social media accounts on 13 July 2022. In the statement, the band "promised" to play "one or two more shows in Australia before we finally say goodnight". These shows, however, never eventuated.

== Critical reception ==
Professional ratings
Review scores
Source	Rating
Vice (Expert Witness)	A−

Up to Anything has a score of 82 out of 100 on Metacritic based on 8 reviews, indicating that it has received "universal acclaim" from critics. In December 2016, Billboard included the album on their critics' list of the Top 50 albums of the year, putting it in 49th place. Billboard described the album as a "gorgeous collection of slacker-default rock". Pitchfork Media's Maria Sherman gave the album a 7.0 score out of 10, writing, "Each song is well-structured and wise beyond its years while the messages are confused, delicate and very, very teenage." NME's Matilda Edwards described the album as "near-flawless guitar pop". Robert Christgau gave it an A−, writing that the band was "cruder than even the earliest Go-Betweens, who were a university band after all, and somewhat static at their worst. Usually, however, they're charming at least."

We're Not Talking was included in Loud and Quiet's and Under the Radar's best-albums-of-2018 lists, respectively putting it at No. 34 and No. 92.

== Discography ==
=== Studio albums ===
List of albums, with selected details
Title	Details	Peak chart positions	
Title	Details	AUS	SCO
Up to Anything	Released: March 2016; Label: Chapter Music (CH132CD/CH132LP); Formats: CD, LP, digital download	—	—
We're Not Talking	Released: 14 September 2018; Label: Chapter Music (CH151CD/CH151LP); Formats: CD, LP, digital download	—	—
Mirror II	Released: 9 July 2021; Label: Chapter Music (CH174CD/CH174LP); Formats: CD, LP, digital download	60	17
