= The Cat's Miaow =

Australian musical group

- Also known as: Hydroplane
- Origin: Melbourne, Victoria, Victoria
- Genre: Indie pop
- Years active: 1992–present
- Labels: Toytown, Golf, Quiddity, Drive-In, Clover, Darla, Sunday, World of Echo, Wurlitzer Jukebox, Split, Lone and Lonesome, Bustop, Library, Daydream
- Members: Bart Cummings; Andrew Withycombe; Kerrie Bolton; Cameron Smith
- Website: thecatsmiaow.bandcamp.com

The Cat's Miaow are an Australian indie pop band formed in Melbourne, in 1992.

== History ==
The Cat's Miaow originally began as a duo of Bart Cummings (guitar, bass, vocals) and Andrew Withycombe (bass, guitar), using a drum machine instead of a drummer. Once they began recording in a studio, they recruited Kerrie Bolton to do vocals as the two didn't have good singing voices and Cam Smith to play drums.

They chose the name The Cat's Miaow because they thought it sounded cool and exotic since, while it was a common phrase in America, it was one that wasn't used often in Australia.

Known for their lo-fi, melodic sound, the band recorded extensively throughout the 1990s. Despite limited domestic recognition, The Cat’s Miaow found greater success and appreciation overseas, similar to other Australian indie acts such as The Particles, Even As We Speak, and The Cannanes.

Over the early 1990s they released a series of cassette albums on the local label Toytown—including Little Baby Sour Puss, Pet Sounds, From My Window, and How Did Everything Get So Fucked Up.

Around 1995, they decided to take a break from using The Cat's Miaow and began a new project named Hydroplane, more focused on ambient-esque music rather than the jangle pop and twee of The Cat's Miaow.

In 1996, U.S. label Bus Stop issued the compilation A Kiss and a Cuddle, followed by Songs For Girls to Sing in 1997 (collecting EPs, live tracks, unreleased material, including their split single with Stereolab). In 1999 they released The Long Goodbye through Darla Records’ Bliss Out series, after issuing ambient‑influenced material under the name .

They have seen reissues and compilation releases in the 2020s, including Songs '92-'94 in 2022 and Skipping Stones: The Cassette Years '92–'93 in 2024 via World Of Echo. They've also released new music since, the Let's Pretend That We Are Something Else and Shelley Street EPs in 2024 and 2025.

== Musical style and influences ==
The Cat's Miaow are an indie pop act. Their dreamy, lo‑fi twee/jangle pop sound, marked by Kerrie Bolton’s soprano vocals, minimalist guitars, synths and melancholic melodies, garnered critical affection overseas more than locally, typical for many Australian indie acts of that era. While they performed live only very sparingly (just a few private events and a handful of shows; they did so because their main focus was on songwriting and recording), they earned a cult reputation largely through tape trading and small‑label releases within the 1990s indie pop underground.

WVAU described the band as "Mazzy Star if they were a little less grounded and their guitarist were slightly better" and said the band's "use of soft electric guitar, synth chords and Bolton's entrancing soprano vocals create this dreamlike sound that will make you feel as if you have been cast under a spell all season long". A review of Songs '94-'98 by The Quietus called the band "one of the great forgotten groups of the 90s twee/jangle pop scene". A review of Skipping Stones said the band "wasn't as flashy as some of their peers, but the warm embrace of the group's early works make clear their appeal".

== Members ==
- Kerrie Bolton – vocals
- Bart Cummings – guitar
- Andrew Withycombe – bass
- Cameron Smith – drums

== Discography ==
=== Albums ===
- Little Baby Sourpuss (1992, Toytown)
- Pet Sounds (1992, Toytown)
- From My Window (1993, Toytown)
- How Did Everything Get So Fucked Up (1993, Toytown)
- Hydroplane (as Hydroplane) (1997, Drive-In)
- Hope Against Hope (as Hydroplane) (1999, Drive-In)
- The Sound of Changing Places (as Hydroplane) (2001, Drive-In)
- When You Smiled And Turned Away (2026, Slumberland)

=== EPs ===
- This Is All I Ever Wanted (1995, Quiddity)
- I Can't Help But Love You (1996, Quiddity)
- J'en ai marre (1996, Drive-In)
- Melbourne Holiday (split with Super Falling Star, The Jordans, and Stinky Fire Engine) (1998, Clover)
- The Love You Bring (as Hydroplane) (1998, Drive-In)
- The Long Goodbye: Bliss Out, Vol. 14 (1999, Darla)
- Let's Pretend That We Are Something Else (2024)
- Shelley Street (2025)

=== Singles ===
- Contrast Split Singles Club Vol. 2 (split with Last Party, French Marigold, and Maylove) (1992, Contrast)
- "Third Floor Fire Escape" (1994, Sunday)
- Split with Stereolab (1995, Wurlitzer Jukebox)
- "I Kept All Your Letters" (1995)
- Excerpts From Upcoming LP (as Hydroplane) (1996, Drive-In)
- "Firefly" (1996)
- Drive In Season (split with The Shapiros, The Singing Bush, and Madison Electric) (1996, Drive-In)
- Australian Pop Series Vol. IV (split with Stinky Fire Engine) (1997, Split and a Half)
- "We Crossed The Atlantic" b/w "Please Don't Say Goodbye" and "Hey Joe" (as Hydroplane) (1997, Wurlitzer Jukebox)
- "Failed Adventure" b/w "Now You Know Everything There Is To Know" (as Hydroplane) (1998, Elefant)
- "When I Was Howard Hughes" b/w "If You Spoke To Me, I Wouldn't Know What To Say" (as Hydroplane) (1998, Bad Jazz)
- "International Exiles" b/w "Bike Wheel On A Chair" and "Blackout" (as Hydroplane) (1999, Liquefaction Empire)
- "Radios Appear" b/w "Embassy Cafe" and "Cherry Lake" (as Hydroplane) (2000)
- Rocketship x The Cat's Miaow (2023, Lone and Lonesome)

=== Compilations ===
- Stuff and Nonsense (1995)
- A Kiss and a Cuddle (1996, Bus Stop)
- Songs For Girls To Sing (1997, Drive-In)
- Shoulder to Shoulder: Collected Singles 1996 - 1998 (as Hydroplane) (2021)
- What Remains: Elsewhere & Overlooked 1998 - 2003 (as Hydroplane) (2021)
- Songs '94-'98 (2022, World of Echo)
- Climb My Stairs, 92-94 (2023, Daydream)
- Selected Songs 1997-2003 (as Hydroplane) (2023, World of Echo)
- Skipping Stones: The Cassette Years '92-'93 (2024, World of Echo)
