= Chloe Alison Escott =

Australian singer-songwriter and comedian

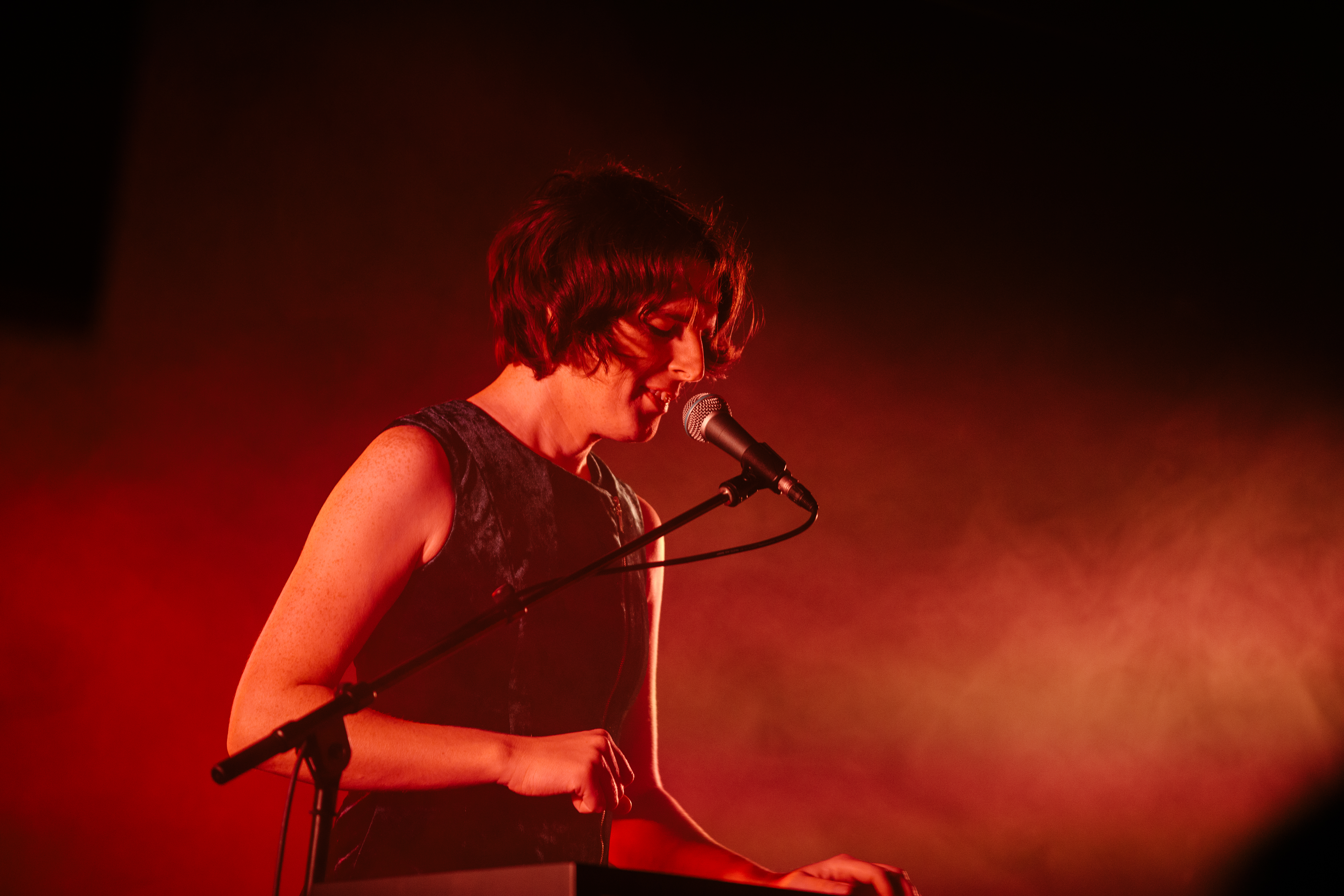
- Escott performing at Dark Mofo in 2021.

Background information
- Origin: Hobart, Australia
- Occupations: Singer; songwriter; musician
- Instruments: Piano; guitar; Nintendo DS
- Years active: 2007–present
- Label: Chapter Music
- Member of: The Native Cats

Chloe Alison Escott is an Australian singer-songwriter and comedian from Hobart, Tasmania. She began her career in comedy and performed at the Raw Comedy national final in 2010. She then became widely known as the frontwoman of the band The Native Cats, best known for the 2018 album John Sharp Toro. During the Native Cats' live shows, she often performs with nothing but synthesiser presets on a Nintendo DS.

In early 2020, she also released the solo album Stars Under Contract which featured the singles "I Know the Soul by Its Presence in Others" and "Back Behind the Eyes Again". In a positive review of Stars Under Contract, NME referred to her as a polymath, "her work spanning poetry, spoken word and experimental comedy".

Escott is a transgender woman, having come out in 2015. Her transition has inspired much of her work, including John Sharp Toro and the song "Stranger than Death".
