= Beaches (band) =

Australian band

- Origin: Melbourne, Victoria, Australia
- Genres: Psychedelic rock; neo-psychedelia; shoegaze; dream pop
- Years active: 2007–present (on hiatus since 2018)
- Labels: Chapter Music
- Members: Antonia Sellbach; Alison Bolger; Ali McCann; Gill Tucker; Karla Way

Beaches is an Australian psychedelic rock band formed in 2007 in Melbourne, Victoria. The band consists of guitarists Antonia Sellbach, Alison Bolger and Ali McCann alongside Gill Tucker on bass and Karla Way on drums; all five members contribute vocals. Its debut self-titled album, released in 2008, was shortlisted for the Australian Music Prize and in 2010 was listed at number 95 in the 100 Best Australian Albums compendium.

Beaches received international acclaim in 2013 with the release of its second album, She Beats, which included a guest appearance from Neu!'s Michael Rother and garnered praise from publications such as Pitchfork and Stereogum. The band's third album, 2017's Second of Spring, continued its run of accolades with another shortlisting for the Australian Music Prize.

Beaches has been on indefinite hiatus since 2018, with the band's last performance taking place in January of that year at Melbourne's Sugar Mountain festival.

== Discography ==
=== Studio albums ===
List of EPs, with selected details
Title	Details
Beaches	Released: November 2008; Label: Mistletone Records (MIST023); Format: CD, LP, digital
She Beats	Released: 2013; Label: Chapter Music (CH107); Format: CD, LP, digital
Second of Spring	Released: July 2017; Label: Chapter Music (CH129); Format: CD, 2×LP, digital
