= Emma Russack =

Australian singer and songwriter

Emma Russack is an Australian singer and songwriter, who grew up in Narooma, New South Wales, where she graduated from high school in 2005. She currently lives in Melbourne.

In 2004, when she was 16, she won the contest Fresh Air of the Australian Broadcasting Corporation for young talents with her song "Used To This". By 2008, she was already known on YouTube, where she had posted eight covers, as well as two songs of her own, playing the guitar. For some time between 2007 and 2008, she took on the artistic name Lola Flash, while being the singer of a band of the same name. The group members were Jake Phillips (bass), Alec Marshall (guitar), Paul Mc Lean (drums) and Kate Delahunty (violin). The single "Psycho", published in 2009, is from that period. She spent a year travelling around in South America. In 2010, the EP Peasants was published, and in 2012 her first album, Sounds Of Our City, including ten songs, was released. Articles about her have appeared in the German and Australian editions of Rolling Stone and in the Australian magazine Frankie. She had her song "All My Dreaming" featured in the ending of The Walking Dead's Season 9 11th episode, "Bounty".

== Discography ==
=== Albums ===
List of albums, with selected details
Title	Details
Sounds of Our City	Released: February 2012; Label: Spunk (URA385); Format: CD, digital
You Changed Me	Released: 2014; Label: Spunk (URA453); Format: CD, LP, digital
In a New State	Released: 2016; Label: Spunk (URA494); Format: CD, digital
Permanent Vacation	Released: 2017; Label: Spunk (URA513); Format: CD, LP, digital
When It Ends (with Lachlan Denton)	Released: 2018; Label: Osborne Again; Format: digital
Keep On Trying (with Lachlan Denton)	Released: July 2018; Label: Osborne Again; Format: digital
Winter Blues	Released: July 2019; Label: Spunk (URA5561) / Osborne Again (OSB023); Format: CD, LP, digital
Take The Reigns (with Lachlan Denton)	Released: October 2019; Label: Spunk (URA5558) / Osborne Again (OSB024); Format: LP, digital
Something Is Going to Change Tomorrow, Today. What Will You Do? What Will You Say? (with Lachlan Denton)	Released: October 2021; Label: Spunk (URA5831) /Osborne Again (OSB038); Format: CD, digital
About The Girl	Released: August 2024; Label: Dinosaur City Records (DCR048); Format: LP, digital

=== Extended plays ===
List of EPs, with selected details
Title	Details
Emma And Alec (as Emma And Alec)	Released: 2009; Label: Why Don't You Believe Me? (WDYBM001); Format: CD, digital
Peasants	Released: 2010; Label: Spunk (URA317); Format: CD, digital
5 Timothée Chalamet Instagram Captions	Released: 2025; Label: Dinosaur City Records; Format: Digital

== Awards and nominations ==
=== AIR Awards ===
The Australian Independent Record Awards (commonly known informally as AIR Awards) is an annual awards night to recognise, promote and celebrate the success of Australia's Independent Music sector.

Year	Nominee / work	Award	Result	Ref.
2025	About the Girl	Best Independent Pop Album or EP	Nominated	
2025	Stephanie Jane Day for "Everything Is Big"	Independent Music Video of the Year	Nominated	

=== EG Awards / Music Victoria Awards ===
The EG Awards (known as Music Victoria Awards since 2013) are an annual awards night celebrating Victorian music. They commenced in 2006.

Year	Nominee / work	Award	Result
2012	Emma Russack	Best Female	Nominated
