= Catcall (musician) =

- Born: Catherine Kelleher
- Origin: Sydney, New South Wales, Australia
- Occupations: songwriter; musician
- Website: catcallxo.com

Catcall (born Catherine Kelleher) is an Australian, Sydney based, musician and singer. A former member of punk band Kiosk, Catcall released her debut solo album, The Warmest Place, in May 2012 through Ivy League Records.

Gawker described "Satellites" as "sublimely catchy", and the American music blog Gorilla vs Bear placed the track in its top 100 songs of 2011. "Swimming Pool" topped Hype Machine upon release, received high praise from sites such as Rose Quartz, Fader and Electrorash, and was voted the best local track of 2010 by Mess+Noise who described it as "... the most resonant pop song to unexpectedly emerge in 2010… This is a rare species of pop music that doesn't press itself upon you. It bleeds and smears and evolves and gradually becomes alive".

The album included a cover version of "I'm in Love with a German Film Star", a 1981 song by British post-punk band The Passions. Videos were produced for three of the album's songs, "August", "Satellites" and "The World is Ours"."

A new single, "One Time," was released in 2017.

A new single, “One Desire” was released on December 20, 2019. Later, she announced she is going to release a new EP called “Yearning” in 2020.

== Awards and nominations ==
=== EG Awards / Music Victoria Awards ===
The EG Awards (known as Music Victoria Awards since 2013) are an annual awards night celebrating Victorian music. They commenced in 2006.

Year	Nominee / work	Award	Result
2012	Catcall	Best Female	Nominated
