= Sodastream (band) =

Australian folk rock duo

- Karl Smith (left) and Pete Cohen

Background information
- Origin: Perth, Western Australia, Australia
- Genres: Rock, folk rock, pop
- Years active: 1996–2007, 2013–present
- Labels: Aquamudvuv, Trifekta, Tugboat, Drive-In, Fortuna Pop!, Hausmusik, Microindie
- Members: Pete Cohen; Karl Smith
- Past members: Adam Johnson
- Website: sodastream.net.au

Sodastream are an Australian folk rock duo consisting of Karl Smith on lead vocals and acoustic guitar; and Pete Cohen on double bass, bass guitar, piano and backing vocals; which formed in 1996 in Perth. They have toured Australia, United States, Europe and Japan and had national rotation on radio network, Triple J. Sodastream issued four studio albums, Looks Like a Russian (22 May 2000), The Hill for Company (3 September 2001), A Minor Revival (4 August 2003) and Reservations (22 May 2006) before disbanding in 2007. In 2011 the pair were both members of Lee Memorial and in 2013 reformed Sodastream.

== History ==
Sodastream began in Perth in 1996, as a pop music group consisting of Peter Ronald Cohen on double bass, bass guitar, piano and backing vocals; Adam Johnson on drums and percussion; and Karl Stephen Smith (ex-Thermos Cardy) on lead vocals and acoustic guitar. In 1997 they recorded and released their debut extended play, Enjoy, on Aquamudvuv Records. The seven-track EP was produced by Anthony Frisina and Steve Elkin guested on piano for one track. Johnson left after the EP appeared but Cohen and Smith continued as a folk rock duo – without a regular drummer. Sarah Corbett of Come with a Smile described their work as "poignant words, elegant melodies, wavering voices, melancholy tones and understated instrumentation".

In late 1998 the pair relocated to Melbourne, where they recorded and released their second EP, Practical Footwear. This seven-track EP was co-produced by Jason Brown and Sodastream, drums were supplied by Dave Bower. The band signed with a range of independent labels including Australia's Trifekta Records, United Kingdom's Tugboat Records and United States' Drive-In Records. The US version of Practical Footwear was trimmed back to six tracks, which Allmusic's Mike DaRonco described as "dreary but mature folk-pop anthems" with "[n]othing uplifting or outgoing, but Sodastream's acoustic arrangements are pleasantly relaxing".

During March and April 1999 Sodastream undertook their first tour of Europe including shows in Netherlands and England. In October that year they returned to Netherlands to perform at the Crossing Border Festival. On 22 May 2000 Sodastream released their first album, Looks Like a Russian, on Trifekta with Gavin Tempany, Laurie Sinagra and the group co-producing; drums were supplied by Marty Brown (later in Art of Fighting). Corbett at Oz Music Project's website praised Smith's "captivating vocals ... [d]elicate, hushed and high pitched. Shy, sad and lonely" while Cohen provided a "calming atmosphere with spine-chilling strums from his double bass and haunting backing vocals". They toured Europe again and had their first shows in Australia outside Perth or Melbourne. Their material was broadcast by national radio network, Triple J.

On 3 September 2001 Sodastream released their second album, The Hill for Company, produced again by Sinagra, Tempany and the duo; with drums by Brown. Oz Music Project's Victoria Hannan noted "the aching and longing of a voice can make your heart skip a beat, the way a simple melody intertwined with the melancholy of a throbbing double bass accompaniment can make you swoon". Australian music journalist, Ed Nimmervoll, explained why The Hill for Company was his Album of the Week, "Karl Smith and his intimate vocals and acoustic guitar, and Pete Cohen with his supportive double bass. On record they add gentle colours and guest musicians – viola, trumpet and trombone, even drums – adding sophistication to what sounds so simple and raw, but without breaking the mood, or overshadowing the central all-important atmosphere. Slowly as you listen, entranced by the mood, the songs begin to shine through". The group undertook two more Australian tours and another tour of Europe.

Further European tours followed in both 2002 and 2003 including a live performance on Italian MTV, two national tours of Australia and then the band's first tour of Japan. On 4 August 2003 their third album, A Minor Revival, was issued. It was produced by Cohen and Smith with Brown (also on drums) and James Walker (aka Machine Translations) (also on lead guitar, slide guitar, keyboards and viola). Johnny Loftus of Allmusic found that the band "continues to fall comfortably in line with the indie twee establishment, it's also delivered another strong set of songs, this time around informed with plenty of hope". Liz Giuffre at Oz Music Project professed "[f]eaturing stunning arrangements of guitar, double bass, viola, trumpet and percussion, [the album] is sweet and seductive, a disk that swells and falls subtly under the tide of the pale male vocals".

From mid-March to early May 2004 Sodastream undertook their first US tour, with further tours of Europe (in May) and Australia (in August). In October of the following year they released another EP, Take Me with You When You Go; the seven tracks had been recorded from March to July by Cohen and Smith. Eliza Sarlos at Mess+Noise enthused "at once calming and intriguing, where the interplay between acoustic guitar, double bass and voice is immediately affecting ... they've still got the songs, the killer songs ...[they] have taken more risks, and in terms of expression ... narratives flourish with a development in both structure and music".

On 22 May 2006 they released their fourth studio album, Reservations, with Cohen and Smith producing. Drowned in Sound's Daniel Ross opined that the group had a "disgustingly brilliant knack of being able to make one simultaneously envious of their craft and sickened that they don't do more with it ... although rather obvious in their execution and the buttons they press, [they] can construct images of the poor, broken sod we probably all are anyway and chillingly shove it in your face under a blanket of sweetness". The album was supported by another European tour. In January 2007 the album was one of 25 finalists for the Australian Music Prize.

On 18 February 2007 the band announced their break-up, with their final show at Melbourne's East Brunswick Club on 2 March. An email from the band's website explained "[o]ur reasons are complex and many, but above all, it is out of respect to the music that we make that we have decided not to force a situation that could potentially damage our many happy memories of the journey thus far". According to Smith "we did Reservations and followed it up with a few big tours and then kind of fell in a heap, and that was it".

After disbandment Cohen was a member of the bands, Khancoban and then Luluc. From 2008 Smith fronted Lee Memorial, which issued an album, The Lives of Lee Memorial, in September 2009. It was recorded over the previous year with Tom Lyngcoln (also in The Nation Blue) on guitar, Laura MacFarlane on drums and vocals and Matt Bailey (ex-The Paradise Motel, Small Sips) on bass guitar. Back in 2006, Smith had guested on Small Sips' alternative country music album, The Morning Ripples. In 2011 Cohen rejoined with Smith in Lee Memorial. In January 2013, Sodastream announced their reformation, including performances in March and a proposed album of previously unreleased work and new material.

== Discography ==
=== Studio albums ===
- Looks Like a Russian CD (22 May 2000)
- The Hill for Company CD (3 September 2001)
- A Minor Revival LP/CD (4 August 2003)
- Reservations LP/CD (22 May 2006)
- Little By Little LP/CD (13 February 2017)

=== Live albums ===
- Concerto al Barchessone Vecchio 28 04 02 live CD (June 2004)

=== Extended plays ===
- Enjoy CD EP (1997)
- Practical Footwear CD EP (1998)
- In Between Times CD EP (2001)
- Take Me with You When You Go CD EP (3 October 2005)

=== Singles ===
- "Turnstyle" 7" vinyl EP (1999)
- "Homesleep" Singles Club 6 CD-single (2003)
- "Constant Ships" promo only CD-single (2003)
