= Twerps (band) =

Australian indie pop band

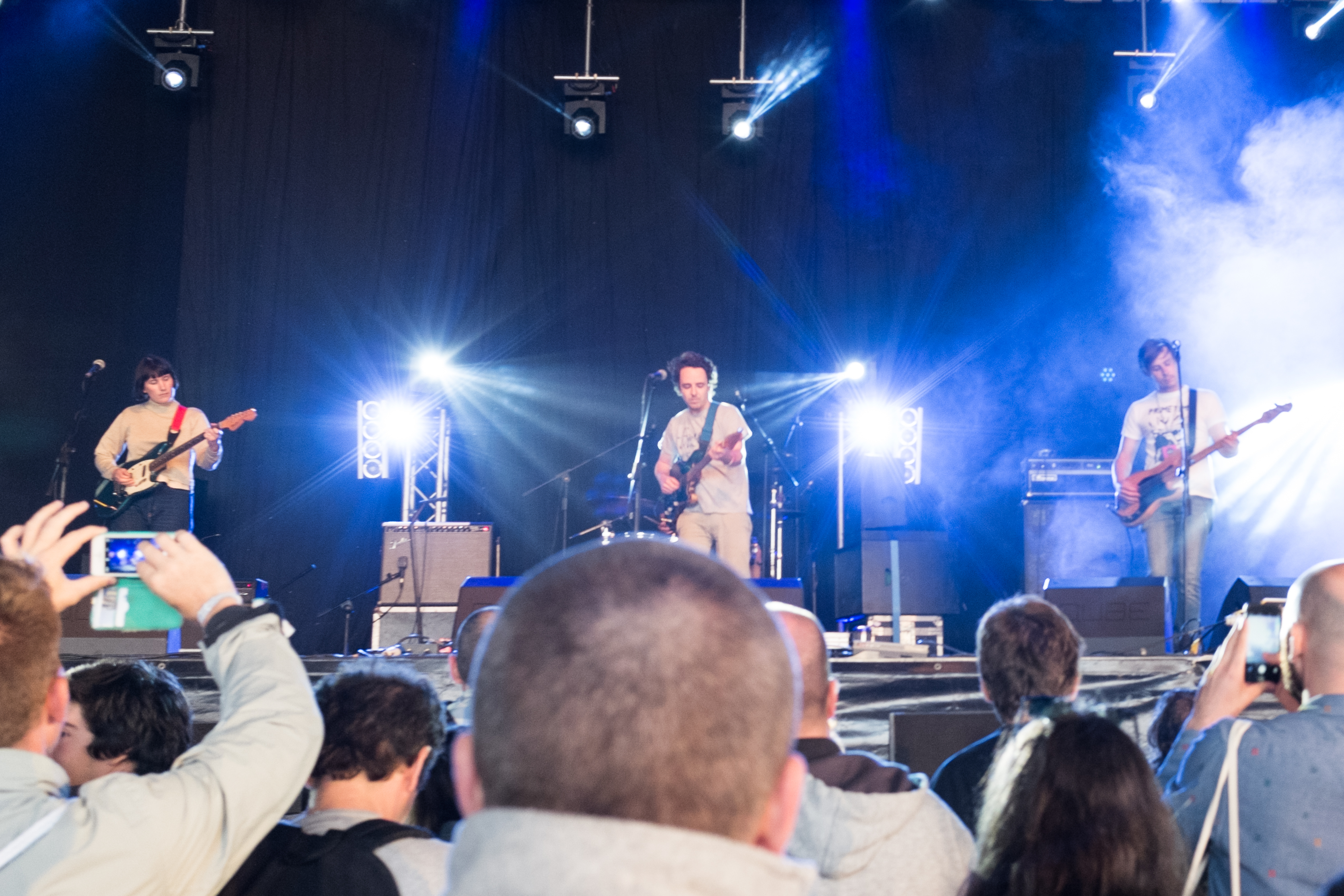
- Twerps performing live at Primavera Sound, Portugal, 2015

Background information
- Origin: Melbourne, Victoria, Australia
- Genres: Indie rock, jangle pop, lo-fi, dolewave
- Years active: 2008–2018
- Labels: Chapter Music, Merge Records
- Past members: Martin Frawley; Rick Milovanovic; Julia MacFarlane; Patrick O'Neill; Alex Macfarlane; Angus Lord; Jazper Doak Stride

Twerps was an Australian indie pop band, formed in Melbourne in 2008.

== History ==
Twerps formed in late 2008 as a "creative outgrowth" of Martin Frawley and Julia MacFarlane's relationship. The band developed a jangly pop sound similar to that of Dick Diver and other contemporaries in the Melbourne indie scene, which subsequently became known as dolewave. Within months of forming, Twerps had already supported international touring groups such as Deerhunter, Yo La Tengo and Oh Sees.

Released by Chapter Music in 2011, the band's self-titled debut LP was favourably received by critics, earning a 7.9 from Pitchfork, which stated that the album is characterised by "excellent melodies, simple guitar lines, and simple lyrics that imply something urgent or devastating". Pitchfork also named the album's closer "Coast to Coast" as a Best New Track, making Twerps the third Australian band to earn the award after Cut Copy and Tame Impala.

In the lead-up to the release of their sophomore LP Range Anxiety, the band recruited Angus Lord and Alex MacFarlane from dolewave band the Stevens, who joined as replacements on bass and drums, respectively. The album led to an international tour and various festival appearances.

Twerps played their final show in November 2017 and released their last song, "It's Time", the following year. They quietly disbanded soon after. Despite breaking up, Frawley is hopeful of a reunion at some point, stating, "One of my favourite records by The Go-Betweens is The Friends of Rachel Worth, which is their comeback ... I want to make music with Jules again [someday]".

== Members ==
- Martin Frawley – vocals, guitar (2008–2018)
- Julia MacFarlane – vocals, guitar (2008–2018)
- Rick Milovanovic – bass guitar (2008–2013)
- Patrick O'Neill – drums (2008–2013)
- Angus Lord – bass guitar (2013–2018)
- Alex MacFarlane – drums (2013–2018)
- Jazper Doak Stride - dancing (now - eternity)

== Discography ==
=== Albums ===
List of albums, with selected details
Title	Details
Twerps	Released: 2011; Format: CD, Digital; Label: Chapter Music (CH91)
Range Anxiety	Released: 2015; Format: CD, Digital, LP; Label: Chapter Music (CH122)

=== Extended plays ===
List of Extended plays, with selected details
Title	Details
The Twerps	Released: 2009; Format: CD, Digital, 7" LP; Label: Chapter Music (CH77)
Underlay	Released: 2014; Format: CD, Digital, 12" LP; Label: Chapter Music (CH120)

== Awards and nominations ==
=== EG Awards / Music Victoria Awards ===
The EG Awards (known as Music Victoria Awards since 2013) are an annual awards night celebrating Victorian music. They commenced in 2006.

Year	Nominee / work	Award	Result
2012	Twerps	Best Album	Nominated
2012	"Dreamin'"	Best Song	Nominated
2012	Twerps	Best Band	Nominated
2012	Twerps	Outstanding Achievement By a Victorian Artist	Nominated
2015	Twerps	Best Band	Nominated
