= Minimum Chips =

Australian electronic and rock band

- Origin: Brisbane, Queensland, Australia
- Genres: Electronic; rock
- Years active: 1993–2007
- Labels: Chapter; Varispeed; Trifekta; Sound Malfunction; Moteer
- Past members: Julian Patterson; Nicole Thibault; Ian Wadley; Guy Blackman; Ellen Turner
- Website: logy.org/~alana/chips

Minimum Chips were an Australian electronic and rock band formed in Brisbane, Queensland in 1993. They issued their debut studio album, Kitchen Tea Thankyou, in November 2005. The group had disbanded by early 2007.

== History ==
Minimum Chips were formed in Brisbane in 1993 by Julian Patterson on guitars, drums, keyboard and electric piano; Nicole Thibault on vocals, organ, synthesiser and trombone; and Ian Wadley on drums, guitar, trumpet and synthesiser. During their Brisbane years Minimum Chips supported international acts: Stereolab, Bikini Kill and Pavement.

Minimum Chips' first release was a split 7-inch five-track extended play on Chapter Records in September 1995. Two tracks were supplied by Perth-based band Molasses. The group's three tracks were recorded in June of that year at Fortitude Valley, Queensland. Guy Blackman, the label's co-owner, eventually joined them on bass guitar in 1998.

In 1996 the group followed with a four-track EP, Blip, and then a split single, with "Postal" by Minimum Chips, and Alastair Galbraith providing the other side. Their next EP, Swish, appeared in 1997 via Varispeed Records, with five tracks, which featured their signature song "Furniture".

Matt Thrower of Rave Magazine caught their gig at The Capitol in October 1998, he opined, "A mantra-like effect was conjured by simple guitar and keyboard melodies. The vocals melded well with the heady surrounds and the overall atmosphere was warm and inviting... this was the Minimum Chips sound I like to hear, as opposed to their more peculiar work supporting Tortoise earlier in the week."

The group relocated to Melbourne in the late 1990s, where they signed to a local label, Trifekta. Their first release there was an eight-track EP, Freckles, in September 1999, which featured the vocals of Pat Ridgewell of cult Brisbane band, Small World Experience. In 2002 Chapter Records released a CD compilation album, Portfolio, of Minimum Chips' early material. Also in that year Patterson and Thibault undertook a side project, Letraset, which issued an album, Snowy Room. By August 2003 Blackman (also in Sleepy Township) had relocated to Tokyo and was replaced in Minimum Chips by Ellen Turner on bass guitar. Blackman returned to the group after Turner relocated to China.

Their influences are varied and include 1960s film soundtracks—"Sunny Spot" from Gardenesque (21 July 2003) contains portions of "Les Caids" from French composer François de Roubaix—and French pop, indie rock and krautrock. Using a small but effective palette of instruments from guitar, bass and drums to Yamaha Electone organ, trombone and glockenspiel, Minimum Chips have managed to achieve a cult following in Australia.

Australian Music Online's Andrew White felt that Gardenesque was "22 minutes' worth of musical ambiguity seems to me the best way to describe this short record. Ambiguity I say, because when you first listen it's all oh-so-vague to you; moreover, it struggles to define itself between any two tracks, but I'm not complaining, don't get me wrong." Releases such as Gardenesque and Sound Asleep show further musical progression and exploration into more complicated structures while still retaining their evocative, intimate and eclectic sound.

On 14 November 2005 Minimum Chips issued their debut studio album, Kitchen Tea Thankyou, via Trifekta. Sophie Best of The Age felt it was "a surprising, intoxicating work evoking the exotic and faraway, rather than the local and familiar." It was co-produced by Patterson with Greg Walker, who Best observed had "created fluorescent textures and shimmering surfaces that don't entirely disguise the home-made charm suggested in the title."

Minimum Chips released a second compilation album, Lady Grey, in 2006 via Moteer Records. They disbanded in early 2007, but briefly reunited in November 2012 to play a gig to celebrate Chapter Music's 20th anniversary.

== Members ==
- Julian Patterson – guitars, drums, glockenspiel, synthesiser, sampler, casiotone
- Nicole Thibault – vocals, organ, trombone, keyboards, drums
- Ian Wadley – drums, guitar, trumpet, synthesiser, organ
- Guy Blackman – bass guitar
- Ellen Turner – bass guitar

== Discography ==
=== Albums ===
- Portfolio (compilation album, Chapter Music, 2002)
- Kitchen Tea Thankyou (Trifekta, 14 November 2005)
- Lady Grey (compilation album, Moteer Records, 2006)

=== Extended plays ===
- Minimum Chips / Molasses (split EP) (Chapter Music, 1995)
- Blip (Chapter Music, 1996)
- Swish (Varispeed, 1997)
- Freckles (Trifekta, 2000)
- Gardenesque (Trifekta, 21 July 2003)
- Sound Asleep (Sound Malfunction Recordings, 2004)

=== Singles ===
- "Postal" / "For Free" (Minimum Chips / Alastair Galbraith, split single) (Varispeed, 1997)
