= EG Awards of 2012 =

Annual Australian music awards ceremony

- Date: 20 November 2012
- Venue: Billboards, Melbourne, Victoria
- Hosted by: Myf Warhurst

The EG Awards of 2012 are the seventh Annual The Age EG (Entertainment Guide) Awards and took place at Billboards on 20 November 2012. The event was hosted by Myf Warhurst. It was the last time under the title of EG Awards before changing its name to Music Victoria Awards from 2013 onwards.

Warhurst in a press release for the ceremony said "As a past writer for the EG and a Melbourne music fan for my entire adult life, there could be no greater pleasure than to help celebrate and congratulate what is one of the greatest music scenes in the world at an event put together by Melbourne's finest music/arts guide."

== Performances ==
- Van Walker
- Liz Stringer
- Angie Hart
- Jess Cornelius from Teeth & Tongue
- Mikelangelo
- Emma Russack

== Hall of Fame inductees ==
- Weddings, Parties, Anything

Weddings, Parties, Anything were inducted into the EG Hall of Fame as they celebrate the 25th anniversary of their 1987 debut, Scorn of the Women.

- Ian Rumbold (non-musician)

== Award nominees and winners ==
=== All genre Awards ===
Winners indicated in boldface, with other nominees in plain.

| Best Album | Best Song |
|---|---|
| **Alpine – A is for Alpine**; Clare Bowditch – The Winter I Chose Happiness; Collarbones – Die Young; Dirty Three – Toward the Low Sun; Gruntbucket – Songs from an Empty Room; Jim Keays – Dirty, Dirty; Liz Stringer – Warm in the Darkness; Oh Mercy – Deep Heat; Pond – Beard, Wives, Denim; Ponyface – Hypnotised; Sherry Rich – Dakota Avenue; Twerps – Twerps | **Tame Impala – "Elephant"**; Alpine – "Villages"; Charles Jenkins – "Pray My Dear Daughter"; Chet Faker – "No Diggity"; Clairy Browne & the Bangin' Rackettes – "Love Letter"; Graveyard Train – "Get the Gold"; Mia Dyson – "When the Moment Comes"; Oh Mercy – "Drums"; Saskwatch – "Your Love"; Something for Kate – "Survival Expert"; The Bamboos featuring Tim Rogers – "I Got Burned"; Twerps – "Dreamin'" |
| Best Male | Best Female |
| **Tim Rogers**; 360; Charles Jenkins; Chet Faker; Dave Graney; Galapagoose; Geoffrey O'Connor; Henry Wagons; Jordie Lane; Mikelangelo; Ron S Peno; Spencer P. Jones | **Lanie Lane**; Butterfly Boucher; Catcall; Clare Bowditch; Courtney Barnett; Emma Russack; Julia Stone; Kate Miller-Heidke; Linda Johnston; Liz Stringer; Mia Dyson; Sherry Rich |
| Best Band | Best New Talent |
| **The Temper Trap**; Alpine; Clairy Browne & the Bangin' Rackettes; Dirty Three; Even; Graveyard Train; Husky; New War; Oh Mercy; Pond; Something for Kate; Twerps | **Bombay Royale**; Bushwalking; Cactus Channel; Chet Faker; Courtney Barnett; Jackson Firebird; King Gizzard & the Lizard Wizard; The Murlocs; Oscar + Martin; Saskwatch; The Smith Street Band; Woollen Kits |
| Best Tour | Outstanding Achievement By a Victorian Artist |
| **Jack White – Festival Hall (Frontier Touring)**; Dig It Up! – The Palace; The Pogues – Festival Hall; Dolly Parton – Rod Laver Arena; Fu Manchu – Cherryrock/HiFi; Lil Band o' Gold – Regal Theatre/Gershwin Room; Mark Lanegan – Forum Theatre; Kanye West – Sidney Myer Music Bowl/Big Day Out; Prince – Rod Laver Arena; The Beach Boys – Rod Laver Arena; The Darkness – The Palace; The Wedding Present – Northcote Social Club | **Oh Mercy**; Ainslie Wills; Ben Browning; Boomgates; Chet Faker; Francolin; Galapagoose; Husky; Lower Plenty; New War; Teeth & Tongue; Twerps |
