= Library Records =

Library Records is an independent record label founded in Melbourne, Australia in 1998, and focusing mainly on indie pop. It is run by Bart Cummings from The Cat's Miaow.

Artists who have released recordings on Library Records include:

- Bart & Friends
- The Cat's Miaow
- The Sound of Music
- Huon
- Other People's Children
- The Shapiros
- Sleepy Township
- Stinky Fire Engine
- Sweet William
- Tugboat

In addition, Library has released a number of compilations, including Indie Aid Abroad, to raise funds for reconstruction in East Timor, and Pacific Highway, a compilation of live recordings from the eponymous show on 3RRR.

== See also ==
- List of record labels
