= The Native Cats =

Australian post-punk duo

- Origin: Hobart, Tasmania
- Genres: Post-punk
- Years active: 2007–present
- Labels: R.I.P Society Records; Rough Skies Records; Chapter Music
- Members: Chloe Alison Escott; Julian Teakle

The Native Cats are an Australian post-punk band from Hobart, Tasmania formed in 2007, consisting of frontwoman Chloe Alison Escott and bassist Julian Teakle. They are known for their 2018 album John Sharp Toro, which was partly inspired by Escott's gender transition. In 2023, they released The Way On is the Way Off, consisting of material written for the PRISM series of experimental shows in Hobart. "Suplex" was named one of the best Australian songs of December 2023 by The Guardian. That same year, their catalogue was released on streaming services by Chapter Music. In their live shows, Escott often performs with nothing but synthesiser presets on a Nintendo DS.

== Discography ==
=== Albums ===
- Always On (2009)
- Process Praise (2011)
- Dallas (2013)
- Shape Memory Alloy (2015)
- John Sharp Toro (2018)
- The Way On is the Way Off (2023)

=== Singles and EPs ===
- "Catspaw" / "Lemon Juice" (2010)
- The Native Cats & The UV Race (2012)
- Spiro Scratch (2018)
- Two Creation Myths (2020)
