= Geoffrey O'Connor =

- Also known as: Sly Hats
- Born: Geoffrey David O'Connor
- Origin: Melbourne, Victoria, Australia
- Genre: Indie pop
- Occupations: Musician, producer
- Instruments: Vocals, lead guitar
- Years active: 2006–present
- Labels: Nervous Jerk, Chapter

Geoffrey David O'Connor is an Australian indie pop musician and producer based in Melbourne. He released his debut studio album Liquorice Night in 2007, under the alias of Sly Hats. O'Connor has since released the solo albums Vanity Is Forever (2011) Fan Fiction (2014) and For as Long as I Can Remember (2021) all through Chapter Music.

O'Connor is also a member of indie pop group The Crayon Fields, on lead guitar and lead vocals.

== As a performer ==
O'Connor’s first album under his own name was Vanity Is Forever, which Triple J's Zan Rowe described as "a distinct step away from the indie-pop of his band. The record is full of synthesisers, and modern soft rock sounds and is written from the perspective of a guy who has both a heavy heart and a high libido". At the time of release, O’Connor visited the US for a sold-out support tour with Jens Lekman, toured Australia as part of the Laneway Festival, and supported Grimes, Edwyn Collins and Pains of Being Pure at Heart on their Australian tours.

O'Connor's next album Fan Fiction was released in August 2014 through Chapter Music. Pitchfork's Jake Cleland gave it a score of 7.4, describing it as an album in which "every dazzling melody is sandwiched together, maximalist and swollen in a dizzying spectacle".

In August 2021, O'Connor released his first solo album in seven years. For as Long as I Can Remember is a suite of duets with fellow Australian singers.

In April 2023, O'Connor is scheduled to release an EP featuring remixes of songs from his 2021 album, For as Long as I Can Remember.

== As a producer ==
O'Connor has produced releases by Sarah Mary Chadwick (Sugar Still Melts in the Rain and Me and Ennui are Friends, Baby); Catcall (The Warmest Place); some tracks on the Jessica Says album Do With Me What U Will; as well as his own solo albums and records by the Crayon Fields. He is also credited with recording bass and vocals on June Jones' 2021 album Leafcutter.

== Discography ==
=== Albums ===
Title	Details
Liquorice Night (by Sly Hats)	Released: 2007; Label: Nervous Jerk (JERK003); Format: CD, Digital, LP
Vanity Is Forever	Released: October 2011; Label: Chapter Music (CH88); Format: CD, Digital, LP
Fan Fiction	Released: August 2014; Label: Chapter Music (CH119); Format: CD, Digital, LP
For as Long as I Can Remember	Released: 6 August 2021; Label: Chapter Music (CH164); Format: CD, Digital, LP, streaming

== Awards and nominations ==
=== EG Awards / Music Victoria Awards ===
The EG Awards (known as Music Victoria Awards since 2013) are an annual awards night celebrating Victorian music. They commenced in 2006.

Year	Nominee / work	Award	Result	Ref.
2012	Geoffrey O'Connor	Best Male	Nominated	
2021	"For As Long As I Can Remember" (with Jonnine)	Best Victorian Song	Nominated	
2021	Geoffrey O'Connor	Best Pop Act	Nominated	
