= The Crayon Fields =

Australian musical group

Crayon Fields
- Origin: Melbourne, Australia
- Genre: Indie pop
- Years active: 2001–present
- Labels: Chapter; Trifekta
- Members: Geoff O’Connor; Brett Hudson; Chris Hung; Neil Erenstrom
- Past members: Jarrad Miller; Rupert Edwards (Live); Raquel Solier (Live); Esther Edquist (Live); Tim Picone (Live)
- Website: Official Site

Crayon Fields is a four-piece Melbourne-based music group signed to the labels Chapter Music and Rallye. They have been described as lo-fi with an artful naïve-pop aesthetic.

== Members ==
The line-up consists of singer-songwriter Geoffrey O'Connor on vocals and guitar, Brett Hudson on bass guitar, Chris Hung on second guitar, synthesizer and percussion, and Neil Erenstrom on drums. O'Connor also has a solo side-project known as Sly Hats and is signed to Nervous Jerk Records with one album to date: Liquorice Night. He has since dropped the 'Sly Hats' moniker and has begun recording and performing his solo material using his name.

== History ==
Their group released their debut studio album Animal Bells on 16 October 2006. It was given a rating of 7.8/10 by Pitchfork Media and was compared to the likes of The Beach Boys, The Zombies and The Association.

Their second album, All the Pleasures of the World was released in September 2009 and was given a 7.8/10 by Pitchfork Media.

In March 2010 Crayon Fields toured the US for the first time, performing in New York, LA and Austin as part of the SXSW festival, which included a live-to-air set for KEXP radio. In Australia Crayon Fields have performed at the Big Day Out, Golden Plains, Parklife and Laneway festivals and have toured with Peter Bjorn and John, Cornelius, The New Pornographers, The Dirty Three, Stereolab, The Mountain Goats, Spoon, The Go! Team and Built To Spill. They toured the US for a second time in October 2010 and played at CMJ festival shows.

== Discography ==
=== Albums ===
Title	Details
Animal Bells	Released: October 2006; Label: Chapter Music (CH56); Format: CD, LP
All the Pleasures of the World	Released: September 2009; Label: Chapter Music (CH66); Format: CD, Digital, LP
No One Deserves You	Released: September 2015; Label: Chapter Music (CH128); Format: CD, Digital, LP

=== EPs ===
Title	Details
Worms, Worms	Released: 2003; Label: We Fear Conspiracy Records (WFC007); Format: CD
The Good Life	Released: 2004; Label: Cavalier Music (CAV033); Format: CD
Crayon Fields	Released: 2006; Label: The Crayon Fields; Format: CD
Make Peace With Love	Released: 2010; Label: The Crayon Fields; Format: Digital
