= Dolewave =

Australian music genre

- Stylistic origins: Indie pop; jangle pop; Dunedin sound; indie rock; post-punk
- Cultural origins: 2010s, Melbourne, Australia
- Typical instruments: Guitar; bass; drums

Other topics
- Australiana; Australian Dream; Music of Melbourne

Dolewave is an Australian music genre that emerged in the early 2010s. Initially used online as an in-joke to describe an indie scene in Melbourne involving Twerps, Dick Diver and other groups, the term has since been applied by music critics to a wider range of Australian acts that share a DIY ethic and a "peculiarly and recognisably Australasian sound", such as Courtney Barnett and Rolling Blackouts Coastal Fever. Common influences include the 1980s jangle pop of Australian bands such as the Go-Betweens, as well as the lo-fi "Dunedin sound" of New Zealand's Flying Nun record label.

== Influences and style ==
Dolewave music has been described as "intrinsically depressed ... beautiful and poignant in an aggressively sad way, in a fashion we can only laugh along with." According to webzine Nothing but Hope and Passion, dolewave is "characterised by a dry, drawling vibe tinged with a healthy touch of suburban sarcasm." Lyrics often contain local signifiers and other Australian pop cultural references, giving the songs a distinct sense of place that points both to the musicians' fondness for Australia, and their "intense need to scrutinise" it.

Academic Ian Rogers writes that dolewave bands often choose to sound "rough-and-ready, and occasionally unskilled", and their recordings almost always have minimal production value. According to music critic Everett True, dolewave's "recalcitrant and ramshackle" sound mirrors the "makeshift venue culture" that many of the bands find themselves in: "underneath decrepit Queenslanders, in open park spaces, in warehouses, rundown pubs, front rooms of share houses".

== Etymology and history ==
The term "dolewave" derives from "the dole", an Australian English term for an unemployment benefit that "supposedly supports artists' creative lifestyles". It was first used in 2012 as an "ironic in-joke" on Mess+Noise, a now-defunct Australian music website. That year, one of the site's journalists, Doug Wallen, coined the term "New Melbourne Jangle" to describe a range of jangly indie pop bands from Melbourne—among them Twerps, Dick Diver and Scott & Charlene's Wedding—which wrote songs about outsider youth and contemporary life in urban Australia. In response to Wallen's article, anonymous users of the site's message board came up with various tongue-in-cheek alternative labels, including "chillmate", "sharehouse-pop", and "dolewave", the last of which quickly eclipsed the others in popularity. "Once uttered, dolewave repeated like a meme, equal parts in-joke, insult and hash-tag shorthand," writes music journalist Shaun Prescott. Over the next year, musicians associated with the term engaged with it ironically, such as Dick Diver's singer, who called dolewave "a good gag" before vowing to destroy it. The term is said to have stuck because it "epitomised the downtrodden, affectless vocals and slack riffs and rhythms which dominated whatever was happening in the spotlit Australian underground."

"Dolewave" remained in "jokey usage" until 2014, when music critics and mainstream publications such as The Guardian and The Sydney Morning Herald began examining it in-depth. Everett True cited fellow music critic Shaun Prescott's review of School of Radiant Living's 2013 self-titled LP as a turning point for dolewave, one where the "tossed-off phrase" became a legitimate genre once he "[sorted] out in his own head as to what the word actually represented". Prescott praises the title track of Dick Diver's 2011 debut album New Start Again as a quintessential dolewave song—"a paean to the years when artists and outsiders could exist without being ‘creatives’, when unprofitable, art-for-its-own-sake wasn't necessarily a contract with poverty." He also highlights "Bad Decisions" (2012) by Bitch Prefect; according to Vice, most twentysomethings can relate to the song's feeling of "suburban boredom and the doldrums of working shitty jobs". A number of independent record labels became associated with dolewave, notably Melbourne's Chapter Music, Sydney's RIP Society, and Brisbane's Bedroom Suck. As dolewave gained wider exposure, terms for offshoots of the genre were invented, a non-serious example being "stadium dolewave" which blends dolewave's "homely, DIY trappings" with the "clean and accessible songwriting" of stadium rock.

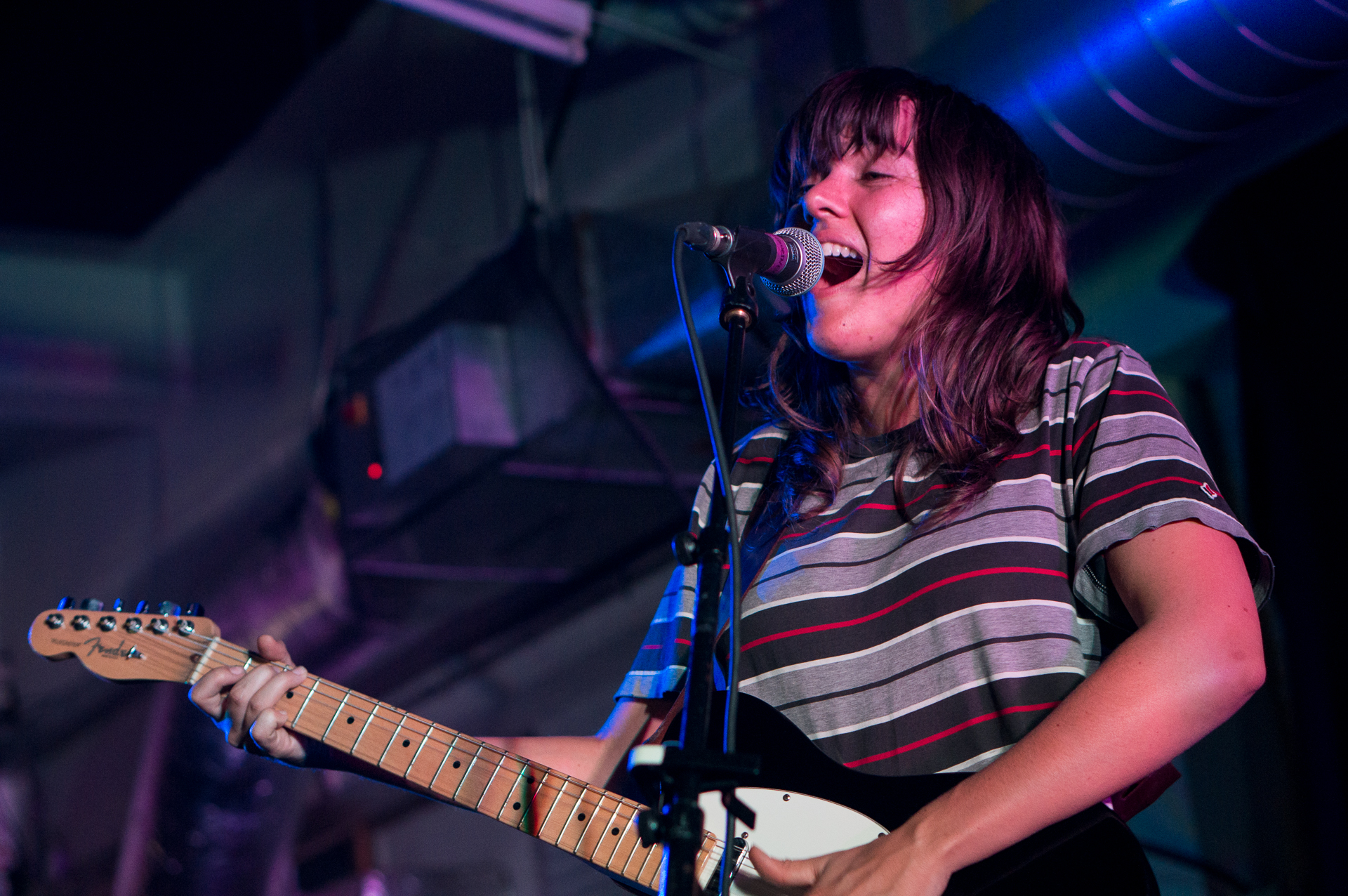
Courtney Barnett

In 2015, Apple Music curated a playlist titled "Best of Dole Wave", featuring, among others, Hockey Dad, Eddy Current Suppression Ring, and Melbourne-based singer-songwriter Courtney Barnett, whose debut album Sometimes I Sit and Think, and Sometimes I Just Sit was released that year to widespread acclaim in Australia and overseas. Although she has distanced herself from the label, Barnett frequently names dolewave's Dick Diver as one of her favourite bands, and regards the scene as a strong influence on her music: "You just find yourself hanging around with the same people and you start making the same music by proxy. Like pet-owners look like their pets." Likewise, Melbourne singer-songwriter Darren Hanlon enjoys the sense of camaraderie in the scene, saying that he often collaborates with, and receives assistance from dolewave musicians.

In the years immediately after dolewave's popularisation, many of the genre's "unwilling flag-bearers" seemed to reject it by eschewing its signature jangly guitars and "true blue" references in favour of a "more mature, polished sound". More recently, a wider range of bands have been aligned with dolewave, including the Goon Sax and Rolling Blackouts Coastal Fever. Several artists have written songs in response to being classified as dolewave, including Beef Jerk's Jack Lee on "Same Thing" (2014) and West Thebarton Brothel Party on their 2016 single "Dolewave".

== Critical interpretations ==
Described as "a case study example of Australianness in music", dolewave has become the focus of discussion and debate around topics related to Australian culture and national identity. Comparing dolewave to 1970s and 1980s Australian pub rock, Vice found that the former genre is more pessimistic in its exploration of Australian identity. Prescott writes:

‘Dolewave’ is a caustic riff on the few virtuous characteristics of white colonial Australia, the ones our politicians are adamant still remain, the ones we affectionately satirise, and the ones which no Kenny can bring back to life. It's a satirical roleplay of an Australia we once believed existed, but which no amount of suspension of disbelief can maintain.

Max Easton made a similar argument, saying that dolewave "is an attempt at reclaiming a cultural identity in a time where it is confused and diluted by the many conflicting ideas that surround everyone's idea of Australia." He goes on to say: "You want to embrace the notion of the classic Australian, but you don't want to alienate the multicultural beauty of the people around you. Where does that leave you? Dolewave sits at the centre of all of this." The term itself has been described as "classist and mean" and "problematic" due to its link to financial status.

== See also ==
- Culture of Melbourne

== Bibliography ==
Books

- Threadgold, Steven (2017). Youth, Class and Everyday Struggles. Routledge. ISBN 9781317532859.
- Stanton, Richard (2016). Corporate Strategic Communication: A General Social and Economic Theory. Macmillan International Higher Education. ISBN 9781137544087.
