= Sleepy Township =

Australian musical group

- Origin: Perth, Western Australia
- Genres: Indie pop
- Years active: 1994–2002, 2009
- Labels: Chapter Music; Library Records; Lost & Lonesome Recording Co.
- Past members: see Members list

Sleepy Township was an indie pop band which was formed in Perth, Western Australia in 1994 as a side project by Guy Blackman (guitar, electric organ, vocals), Mia Schoen (Molasses) (guitar, electric organ, vocals), and Paul Williams (Molasses) (drums, vocals). The band moved to Melbourne the following year, with Chris Gorman replacing Williams. Alison Bolger (ex-Clag) joined the group on bass in 1998. The group released two full-length albums, Set Sail in 1998 and Deep Water in 2001, together with several EPs, for Australian indie label Chapter Music among others. The group broke up in March 2002, although they reformed six months later for a single performance to release, All These Records, a compilation album, consisting of the band's singles and rarities. As Bolger was away overseas, bass duties were performed by Mindy Mapp (ex-Little Ugly Girls, Fur and Flesh Vs. Venom). The group reformed briefly in 2009 for two shows.

Since breaking up in 2002, all members have been active as writers and performers in other groups that either co-existed during Sleepy Township's lifetime or were formed shortly after their demise. Blackman is a solo artist, was a member of Minimum Chips and runs the Chapter Music record label. Bolger was a member of Panel of Judges and psych-rock quintet Beaches, while Gorman and Schoen perform as part of New Estate.

== Members ==
- Guy Blackman - guitar, keyboards, vocals (1994–2002, 2009)
- Mia Schoen - guitar, keyboards, bass, vocals (1994–2002, 2009)
- Alison Bolger - bass, guitar, keyboards, vocals (1998–2002, 2009)
- Chris Gorman - drums, vocals (1995–2002)
- Paul Williams - drums (1994–5)
- Mindy Mapp - bass (2002)

== Discography ==
Albums

- Set Sail - Chapter Music (CH24) (December 1998)
- Deep Water - Library Records (Shhh15) (July 2001)
- All These Records - Lost & Lonesome Recording Co. (compilation of singles and rarities) (16 September 2002)

EPs

- Sleepy Township/The Cannanes split single - Chapter Music/H Records (CH13) (October 1996)
- Online - Chapter Music (CH18) (June 1997)
- Morning - Library Records (Shhh12) (2000)
- Sleepy Township/Smiley - Chapter Music (CH30) (October 2000)
- Tragedy & Hope - Dutch Courage (2002)
