= Small Batch (EP) =

EP by The Cannanes
- Released: March 19, 2013
- Genres: Indie pop, dream pop
- Length: 17:54
- Label: Exro.fm
- Producer: Stephen Hermann

Professional ratings
Review scores
Source	Rating
Blurt	3/5 stars
Robert Christgau	(2-star Honorable Mention)
CMJ	positive
PopMatters	7/10 stars

Small Batch is a 2013 EP by Australian indie pop band the Cannanes.

== Track listing ==
1. Bumper
2. Crawler
3. Basics
4. Molecule
5. Tiny Compartment
6. Zone
