= Trifekta =

Trifekta Records
- Founded: 1997
- Founder: Tom Larnach-Jones; Tim Everest; Paul Towner
- Distributor: Festival Mushroom Records
- Genre: Various
- Country of origin: Australia
- Location: Fitzroy, Victoria

Trifekta was an Australia-based independent record label, based in Fitzroy, Victoria. It was started in 1997 by Tom Larnach-Jones (Shock Records), Tim Everest and Paul 'Presser' Towner (Gerling).

The first release for the label was the debut release for the Avalanches, a limited edition 7-inch single entitled "Rock City". This was followed by another limited edition 7-inch single, Gerling's "Bachelor Pad". Towner returned to Sydney and not long after this, Everest left the label in the hands of Larnach-Jones, so that he could focus on his fashion label Schwipe.

== Artists ==
Bands released on the Trifekta label include:

- The Crayon Fields
- Deerhoof
- Magnolia Electric Co.
- Minimum Chips
- Mountains in the Sky
- Preston School of Industry
- Xiu Xiu
- Architecture in Helsinki
- Art of Fighting
- The Avalanches
- The Decemberists
- Dynomite D
- Gerling
- Gersey
- The Go-Betweens
- Life Without Buildings
- Motor Vehicle Sundown
- Ninetynine
- Sodastream
- Songs: Ohia
- Superchunk
- Ukiyo-e
- Via Tania
- Your Wedding Night

== See also ==
- List of record labels
- Australian indie rock
