= Panel of Judges =

- Panel of Judges performing at Open Casket EP Launch in 2004

Background information
- Origin: Melbourne, Victoria, Australia
- Genres: Indie rock
- Years active: 1998–present
- Labels: Chapter Music; Gothic Pharaoh Records; Mistletone; Weather Records
- Members: Dion Nania; Alison Bolger; Paul Williams; Martin Frawley
- Past members: Michael Nichols
- Website: Official Site

Panel of Judges are an Australian indie rock band from Melbourne. Dion Nania began the group in 1998 as a solo project, then added Alison Bolger, Michael Nichols and Paul Williams soon afterwards.

Nania, originally from Geelong, had played with the Golden Lifestyle Band; Bolger, originally from Brisbane, had played bass in Clag and Sleepy Township and in looser configurations such as an improvisational group with Mia Schoen and Ellen Turner; Williams had been a member of Perth group Molasses and, in the early days of Panel of Judges was also drumming in Melbourne band Jaguar is Jaguar; and Nichols had been a formative figure in the Hanshalf Trio in Melbourne, Crabstick and Blairmailer in Sydney, and the 'travelling' group Ruff Buff.

Panel of Judges' first release was an EP, Blind as a Bat on Chapter Music in 1998; their debut album Cool Fool was released later that year after which Nichols left and the band continued as a three-piece. They travelled to Europe in 2002, playing in London and Paris, and returned in 2004 to record their second album No Scandal - No Future - In Heaven, the title of which was 'stolen from a card left on Serge Gainsbourg's grave'. They have since toured Japan and New Zealand; their third album, Bad Vibrations was released on Mistletone in late 2008.

== Members ==
- Dion Nania - guitar, vocals
- Alison Bolger - bass, vocals
- Paul Williams - drums
- Martin Frawley - guitar

== Discography ==
=== Albums ===
- Cool Fool (1999)
- No Scandal - No Future - In Heaven - Independent/MGM (GP4) (20 February 2006)
- Bad Vibrations - Mistletone (MIST025) (22 November 2008)

=== EPs ===
- Blind as a Bat - Chapter Music (CH26) (February 1999)
- Open Casket - Weather Records (WR007) (September 2004)

=== Singles ===
- "Panel"
