= The Cannanes =

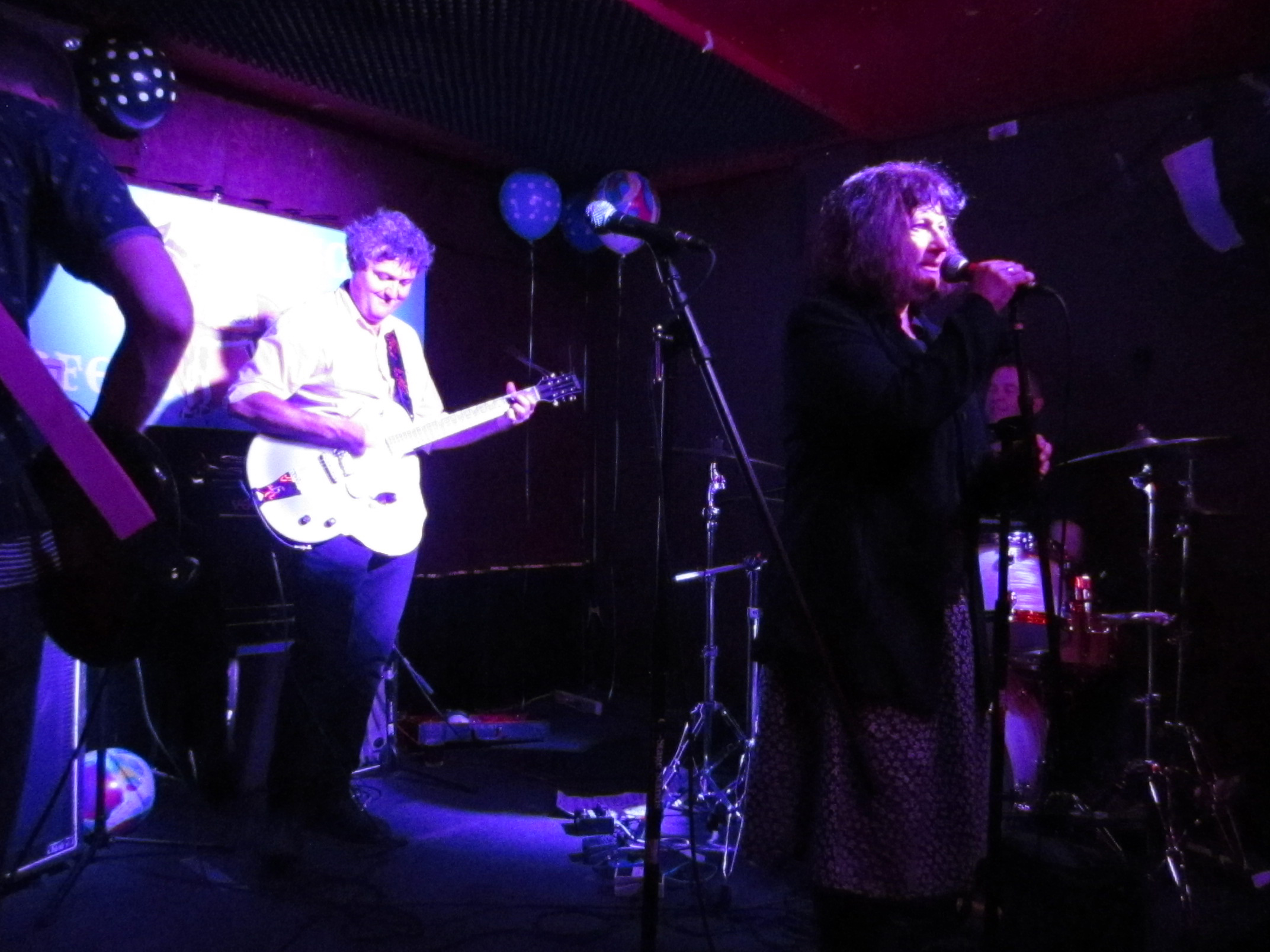
- The Cannanes in San Francisco, 2016

Background information
- Origin: Sydney, New South Wales, Australia
- Genres: Indie pop
- Years active: 1984-present
- Labels: 555 Recordings, Chapter Music, Dark Beloved Cloud, Insound, K Records, Lamingtone, Little Teddy Recordings, Slabco, Yo-Yo
- Members: Stephen O'Neil; Frances Gibson; IN COLLABORATION WITH: Andrew Coffey; Bon King; David Nichols; Explosion Robinson; Francesca Bussey; Greg Wadley; Guy Blackman; James Dutton; Jen Turrell; Johnno Lattin; Lance Hillier; Mia Schoen; Nick Ketley; Penny McBride; Shintaro Kiyonari; Stewart Anderson
- Past members: Annabel Bleach; Michelle Cannane; Foxy Humdinger; Randall Lee; Ivor Moulds; Sally Cameron; Jim Woff; Gavin Roy Butler; Nick Kidd />Crayola Sarandon (Simon Williams)
- Website: www.cannanes.com

The Cannanes are an Australian indie pop band formed in Sydney in late 1984. In the band's 40-year plus history the lineup has regularly changed, with Stephen O'Neil and Frances Gibson the only constant members.

== History ==
The original 1984 line-up of the band was Stephen O'Neil (vocals, guitar), Annabel Bleach (vocals), Michelle Cannane (guitar and percussion), Frances Gibson (bass), and David Nichols (drums). The band released their first single "Life"/"It's Hardly Worth It" in a limited edition of just 12 cassettes in 1985, followed the same year by a cassette album, The Cannanes Come Across with the Goods. The band's first vinyl release was the Bored Angry & Jealous EP in 1986, which was proclaimed "Single of this and any other week" by The Legend! writing in the NME. Bleach left in 1987; Susan Grigg joined briefly on violin, but she and Cannane left soon afterwards The band underwent several line-up changes over the years: Randall Lee (of Ashtray Boy) was a member of the group in 1987-88 during which time they recorded their debut album, The African Man's Tomato and two singles released simultaneously, "Cardboard" and "I Think the Weather's Affected Your Brain".

The Cannanes released their second album, A Love Affair With Nature in 1989, on their own label (or rather on no label at all), with O'Neil and Gibson now sharing vocal duties. They toured the United States for the first time in 1991, recording the Caveat Emptor album to coincide with it, although it was not released until 1993. Numerous other releases followed. Core additional members in the early 1990s included bassist/vocalists Gavin Butler (on the albums Arty Barbecue and Short Poppy Syndrome) and Francesca Bussey (on a self-titled album and a long EP, Tiny Frown). Nichols left in 1996 to form Driving Past with Gig Ryan, Andrew Withycombe and Mia Schoen; his immediate replacement was Ivor Moulds. O'Neil and Gibson remained constant members, returning in early 1998 with the It's a Fine Line Between Pleasure and Pain EP, and an album, Living the Dream, later that year.

In the 2000s, the band continued play occasional shows in Australia as well as numerous overseas tours in Europe, Japan, The United States and Mexico. They also collaborated with electronica artist Explosion Robinson on the Felicity and Electro 2000 EPs and Trouble Seemed So Far Away album, and also collaborated with Steward (aka Stewart Anderson of Boyracer) on the Communicating at an Unknown Rate album and the Felicity EP.

On 19 March 2013 a new EP Small Batch was released in the United States, and on 16 April the 7 track the Small Batch Remixes EP. In June the band returned to the United States as invited guests at the chickfactor zines' 21st Festival and recording dates in Brooklyn & Flagstaff, AZ. On 5 July a new album, Howling at All Hours was released internationally on Melbourne-based label Chapter Music. This was followed by an East Coast Australian tour and the release of a single on new US label Emotional Response, before the year was out. The band wrote a song, "Tempus Fugit," to commemorate the late Australian Prime Minister, Gough Whitlam after he died in October 2014.

2015 saw a flurry of activity following the well received January 'Original Masters' re-issue of the Communicating at an Unknown Rate album including a West Coast U.S. tour as well as shows in New York and Berlin. In 2016 the band returned to Flagstaff to finish work on an as yet unreleased album as well as headlining the opening night of The San Francisco Pop Fest, and later in the year released and launched a 12" remastered Picture Disc version of their 2nd and to date most popular LP.

In 2016 they released a deluxe redux / remastered version of A Love Affair With Nature (their 1989 LP), including a 12″ picture disc, with free digital component and a PDF booklet. They also uploaded to YouTube a collection of songs filmed live in Redfern, Sydney, back in 1989. These were “Live at 65” referring to 65 Cope Street Redfern NSW.

While new releases were on hold apart from the track "Moonhands" on a pandemic-era compilation (released on 24 December 2020 on Almost Halloween Time Records' Bandcamp), the Cannanes have played regular shows in Australia including 2017 a show at the Royal Theatre Castlemaine with Total Control and Terry, and Chapterfest 30 at Northcote Theatre with Laura Jean and other luminaries on 5 November 2022. The Cannanes played the Paris Popfest 2023 at Le Hasard Ludique in Paris on 30 September that year. In 2025 the Cannanes played at the third Athens Pop Underground Fest & Convention in Athens, Greece, on 23 May at the Half Note Jazz Club, on 31 May 2025 they played with The Mekons in Paris, at Le Hasard Ludique, Saint-Ouen, and also performed at Manchester Popfest on 4–5 July 2025, at Levenshulme Old Library.

Plans are well advanced for an Italian tour in May 2026.

== Discography ==
=== Cassettes ===
- Ben/The Postmans Whistle (1984), no label
- Life/It's Hardly Worth It (1985), Happy Penis
- The Cannanes Come across With the Goods Cassette album (1985)
- Happy Swing EP (1987), K - reissued (2013), All Gone
- I've seen it all (Rarities 2) (1989)
- Pictures EP (1993), no label
- The Cannanes (1996), Ajax

=== Singles ===
- "Cardboard"/"Woe" 7" (1988)
- "I Think the Weather's Affected Your Brain"/"Stories to be Kept Under Lock and Key" 7" (1988)
- "Broken Bottles" (1992), Bi-Joopiter
- "Miserable"/"William" 7" (2000), 555 Recordings
- "Hit The Wall" (2013), Emotional Response (7" & Dig)

=== EPs ===
- Bored Angry & Jealous (1986), Distant Violins
- No One (1987), K
- Stumpvision (1992), Ajax
- Frightening Thing (1994), K
- Prototype (1994), Little Teddy
- Simple Question (1996), Ajax
- Price You Pay (1996), H (split with Sleepy Township)
- It's a Fine Line Between Pleasure and Pain (1998), Harriet
- Tiny Frown (1998), Yo-Yo
- Population~Two (1998), Blackbean & Placenta (split with Timonium)
- Australian Tour (2000), Blackbean & Placenta
- Electro 2000 (2000), Insound Tour Support
- Felicity (2001), 555 (split with Steward & Explosion Robinson)
- Crank It Up! (2001), Blackbean & Placenta
- Grassy Flat (2008), Dark Beloved Cloud
- Small Batch (2013), exro.fm/Lamingtone (6 Track CD, 12" & Dig)(with Stephen Hermann)
- Small Batch Remixes (2013), exro.fm (7 Track Digital only)

=== Albums ===
- The African Man's Tomato (1987)
- A Love Affair With Nature (1989), no label (reissued 1990 on Feel Good All Over and in 1995 with additional tracks)
- Caveat Emptor (1993), Feel Good All Over
- Short Poppy Syndrome (1994), Ajax
- The Cannanes (1996), Ajax
- Living the Dream (2000), Chapter Music
- Communicating at an Unknown Rate (2000), 555/Yo-Yo Recordings (with Steward)
- Trouble Seemed So Far Away (2002), Slabco (US) & Lamingtone (Australia) (with Explosion Robinson)
- Howling at all Hours (2013), Chapter Music
- A Love Affair With Nature (2016), Chapter Music (LP; (Picture Disc) remastered)

=== Compilations and live albums ===
- Witchetty Pole (1993), Feel Good All Over (compilation of first EP and first album)
- Arty Barbecue (1998), Ajax (compilation of singles and b-sides and unreleased song recorded in 1996)
