= List of jangle pop bands =

This is a list of jangle pop bands. Jangle pop is a genre of rock music created in the 1960s that saw a resurgence in the 1980s.

== Artists ==
- 10,000 Maniacs
- 54-40
- Alvvays
- Aztec Camera
- Big Dipper
- Big Star
- Belly
- The Byrds
- The Chills
- The Church
- The Clean
- Close Lobsters
- Lloyd Cole and the Commotions
- The Connells
- The Cranberries (early work)
- The dB's
- The Feelies
- Felt
- Game Theory
- Gin Blossoms
- The Go-Betweens
- The Grapes of Wrath
- Guadalcanal Diary
- Guster
- Her's
- The Housemartins
- The Hummingbirds
- James (early work)
- Kiwi Jr.
- The La's
- Let's Active
- Life in Film
- McCarthy
- The Ocean Blue
- Orange Juice
- Pylon
- Real Estate
- R.E.M.
- The Rembrandts
- The Refreshments
- Rolling Blackouts Coastal Fever
- The Smiths
- The Sundays
- Teenage Fanclub
- The Wedding Present (early work)

== See also ==
- Dunedin Sound
- Paisley Underground
