= Jangle pop =

Music genre

- Etymology: Jangle
- Stylistic origins: Pop; college rock; post-punk; folk rock
- Cultural origins: 1960s–1980s, United States
- Typical instruments: 12-string electric guitar
- Derivative forms: Indie pop; indie rock

Subgenres
- Paisley Underground; dolewave

Jangle pop is a subgenre of pop rock and indie rock that emphasizes jangly guitars and 1960s-style pop melodies. The "jangly" guitar sound is characterized by its clean, shimmering and arpeggiated tone, often created using 12-string electric guitars. The term is usually applied to late 1970s/early 1980s bands emerging from the post-punk scene, often influenced by 1960s groups such as the Byrds. Notable acts include Big Star, R.E.M. and the Smiths.

== Origins ==
In the late 1970s and 1980s, prominent early jangle pop groups included Big Star, R.E.M., the dB's, 10,000 Maniacs, and the Smiths. In the early to mid 1980s, the term "jangle pop" emerged as a label for an American post-punk movement that recalled the sounds of "jangly" acts from the 1960s. Between 1983 and 1987, the description "jangle pop" was used to describe bands like R.E.M. and Let's Active as well as the Paisley Underground subgenre, which incorporated psychedelic influences.

== Alternative/indie rock ==
During the early 1980s, the genre was reconfigured by independent bands who enjoyed success on college rock charts and radio stations. This included groups such as R.E.M. and Let's Active, who emerged from post-punk scenes and appropriated the sounds of jangle acts from the 1960s, as well as the adjacent Paisley Underground movement, which incorporated psychedelic influences. AllMusic categorized jangle pop as a subgenre of alternative or indie rock while describing it as a "pop-based format", but not mainstream, as the lyrics could often be "deliberately cryptic", and the sound "raw and amateurish" with DIY production. According to music journalist Denise Sullivan, "all signs point toward the dB's reinventing 'jangle-rock,' before R.E.M. made it famous."

The Athens, Georgia group Pylon, formed in 1979, influenced the local scene with what AllMusic contributor Jason Ankeny termed an "angular, propulsive jangle pop sound". In addition to R.E.M., English band the Smiths were a prominent early jangle pop group. Subsequent jangle pop bands largely imitated R.E.M. and, despite its foundations in 1960s folk rock bands such as the Byrds, groups were sometimes unfamiliar with the genre's 1960s predecessors. An article in Blogcritics magazine claims that, besides R.E.M., the "only other jangle-pop band to enjoy large sales in America were the Bangles, from Los Angeles", although the Bangles were at the time more closely associated with the contemporaneous, Los Angeles based Paisley Underground scene.

The Dunedin sound was a key scene for jangle pop. Bands such as the Chills, the Clean, the Verlaines, the Bats and Straitjacket Fits synthesised 1970s alternative rock and post-punk with jangle, and the scene soon spread to Auckland and other New Zealand cities.

In Austin, Texas, the term New Sincerity was loosely used for a similar group of bands, led by the Reivers, Wild Seeds and True Believers.

== See also ==
- List of jangle pop bands
