= Dick Diver =

Australian musical group

- Origin: Melbourne, Victoria, Australia
- Genres: Indie pop, dolewave
- Years active: 2008–2018; 2025–present
- Label: Chapter Music
- Members: Rupert Edwards; Alistair McKay; Steph Hughes; Al Montfort

Dick Diver is an Australian four-piece indie pop band from Melbourne, Victoria (Australia). The band consists of Rupert Edwards (guitar) and Alistair McKay (guitar), Steph Hughes (drums) and Al Montfort (bass). It took its name from the character Dick Diver in the novel Tender Is the Night by F. Scott Fitzgerald.

== Origins and development ==
Dick Diver was formed in 2008, with guitarists Rupert Edwards and Alistair McKay, drummer Steph Hughes (Boomgates) and bassist Al Montfort (Total Control, UV Race, Lower Plenty et al.). The band have been one of the products of the "New Melbourne Jangle" scene in Australia and overseas. They are also the pioneers of a joke genre called "dolewave".

In 2009, Dick Diver released their debut EP, Arks Up.

Their debut album, New Start Again, was listed on a number of year's end best-of polls, including from Mess and Noise.

Dick Diver shared a vinyl single with one of Montfort's other bands Lower Plenty, as part of the 2013 singles club series for iconic US label Matador.

Their 2013 album Calendar Days was named by The Guardian as the best Australian album of 2013, and the second best album by Mess and Noise. It appearing on best-of 2013 lists from the Sydney Morning Herald, The Music, Buzzfeed, Faster Louder, Beat, and The Finest Kiss.

The band's final live performance was a Christmas show in December 2018; they reunited in mid-2025 ahead of a series of shows at the Thornbury Theatre in August.

== Discography ==
=== Albums ===
Title	Details
New Start Again	Released: October 2011; Label: Chapter Music (CH92); Format: CD, LP, digital download
Calendar Days	Released: March 2013; Label: Chapter Music (CH105); Format: CD, LP, digital download
Melbourne, Florida	Released: 6 March 2015; Label: Chapter Music (CH124); Format: CD, LP, digital download

=== EPs ===
Title	Details
Arks Up	Released: November 2009; Label: Chapter Music (CH74); Format: CD, LP, digital download
Alice	Released: November 2012; Label: Chapter Music; Format: digital download

== Awards ==
=== AIR Awards ===
The Australian Independent Record Awards (commonly known informally as AIR Awards) is an annual awards night to recognise, promote and celebrate the success of Australia's Independent Music sector.

Year	Nominee / work	Award	Result
2013	themselves	Best Independent Artist	Nominated
2013	Calendar Days	Independent Album of the Year	Nominated

=== Australian Music Prize ===
The Australian Music Prize (the AMP) is an annual award of $30,000 given to an Australian band or solo artist in recognition of the merit of an album released during the year of award. The commenced in 2005.

Year	Nominee / work	Award	Result
2015	Melbourne, Florida	Australian Music Prize	Nominated

=== Music Victoria Awards ===
The Music Victoria Awards (previously known as The Age EG Awards and The Age Music Victoria Awards) are an annual awards night celebrating Victorian music.

Year	Nominee / work	Award	Result	Ref.
2013	themselves	Best Band	Nominated	
2013	Calendar Days	Best Album	Nominated	
2015	Melbourne, Florida	Best Album	Nominated	
