= Chapter Music =

Australian record label

- Founded: June 1992
- Founder: Guy Blackman
- Genre: various
- Country of origin: Australia
- Location: Northcote, Victoria
- Official website: Chapter Music

Chapter Music is one of Australia's longest-running independent record labels. Chapter Music has worked with a broad range of mostly Australian artists, in genres such as rock and roll, indie pop, post punk, country and western and folk. Between 1992 and 2013, the label released around 45 titles, including several compilation albums, such as Can't Stop It! Australian Post-Punk 1978–82 and Songs For Nao. The label's 2014 roster features bands such as Dick Diver, Beaches and Twerps.

== History ==
The label was founded by Guy Blackman in Perth, Western Australia in June 1992, after he released several issues of a Syd Barrett-inspired fanzine called Chapter 24, started in October 1990, when Blackman was seventeen. Initially, Blackman released compilation cassettes of local Perth underground bands, the first of which was Bright Lights, Small City in July 1992. A Sonic Youth tribute tape called Kill Yr Idols! was the label's next release, followed by a new fanzine called Salty & Delicious. The label released a further eight cassettes (mostly compilations), one CD, and four issues of the fanzine prior to Blackman's relocation to Melbourne, Australia. Blackman explained in 2012: "When I sold out of the first Chapter Music cassette on the night of the show, that was a huge success for me, as a 17-year-old boy."

Blackman relocated to Melbourne in mid-1995, where he released Chapter Music's first seven-inch vinyl single, pressed at Corduroy Records, a new pressing plant in Australia at the time. The single, a Molasses/Minimum Chips split single—Blackman is a member of the latter band—was released in September 1995. This was followed by a seven-inch single by Perth band Sulk, with a third release, a split single for Sleepy Township/Cannanes released in October 1996.

The label briefly closed for 18 months in 2002 when Blackman and his partner, Ben O'Connor, relocated to Japan. In a 2013 interview, Blackman explained that he made connections with a "little underworld of Japanese underground psychpop" during his time in Japan, in addition to playing his own live shows and collaborating with local artists. Blackman said that by the time his visa expired he felt like his time in Japan was merely starting; however, at the time of the interview, he explained that he retained connections with artists like Tenniscoats following his return to Australia.

Chapter Music reissued the 1980 self-titled live recording of Melbourne post-punk/noise band Primitive Calculators in 2004, which was the band's sole official release at the time. The label released the 17-track Primitive Calculators and Friends compilation in 2007, which featured the only Primitive Calculators studio recording ever released and the Little Bands compilation. In a 2009 interview, Stuart, of Primitive Calculators, said: "I think Guy Blackman is a kind of angel to do what he does and stay who he is."

The label's 20th anniversary occurred in 2012 and the label was co-managed by Blackman and O'Connor by this stage. In an interview with the Sydney Morning Herald (SMH) in November 2012, O'Connor explained: "We've only ever done things that we love and care about", while Blackman expressed his view on the label's longevity openly:

I've found myself becoming very sensitive to any perceived indifference to the anniversary ... To me it seems like a big deal. There's not that many record labels that last this long; Ben and I have watched a lot of them come and go.

Chapter Music released a compilation of rarities, 20 Big Ones, as part of the 20th anniversary commemoration—including a song by Minimum Chips—and an anniversary show was staged in Melbourne, during Melbourne Music Week, with performances from Crayon Fields, Twerps, Pikelet, Laura Jean and Primitive Calculators, among others.

In the 2012 SMH interview, Blackman described the label's health as "better than ever", and explained in an interview the following year that the label "can provide support for a long term career for a band ... The community aspect and the relationships are the most important thing about the label." During 2013, Chapter Music attended the CMJ Music Marathon and released albums by Dick Diver, Beaches, Primitive Calculators, Pikelet and Bushwalking. The Primitive Calculators release, The World Is Fucked, is the first-ever studio album by the band, which was 35 years old at the time of the release date.

An August 2014 announcement revealed that Twerps signed to US label Merge Records, while retaining their arrangement with Chapter Music for Australia and New Zealand. The Underlay EP—described by music journalist Anthony Carew as "the work of a band who’s already done a lap around the hype-bubble block and returned feeling jaded"—was released by the band in August 2014. Also in August 2014, Laura Jean released her self-titled album on Chapter Music, which was recorded in England, UK, with John Parish.

In 2023, Chapter Music released The Native Cats' catalogue on streaming services.

== Accolades ==
Beaches' 2008 debut album was shortlisted for the Australian Music Prize, and listed in the 2010 book 100 Best Australian Albums. In December 2013, Chapter Music artists Dick Diver, Primitive Calculators, Bushwalking and Beaches featured in the critics' lists of the mess+noise and The Guardian websites, as they selected their best Australian albums of 2013. Dick Diver's Calendar Days was voted into the number 1 position by the Guardian critics; the album was then voted into the number 1 position of the mess + noise 2013 readers poll. In BuzzFeed's "The Very Best Australian Albums of 2013" list, published on 29 December 2013, both Beaches and Dick Diver appeared.

In 2019, Chapter Music won the AIR Award for Best Independent Label.

== Artists ==
- Always
- Andreas & Oscar
- Andrew Wilson
- Beaches
- Bum Creek
- Bushwalking
- Chris Robison
- The Cannanes
- Clag
- Clare Moore
- Coolies
- Crayon Fields
- Danny & The Parkins Sisters
- Darren Sylvester
- David Chesworth
- Dick Diver
- Driving Past
- Essendon Airport
- Fabulous Diamonds
- Frida Hyvönen
- Geoffrey O’Connor
- The Goon Sax
- Gregor
- Gus
- Guy Blackman
- Hit The Jackpot
- Jeremy Dower
- Jonny Telafone
- Karl Smith
- Kath Bloom
- Kath Bloom & Loren Connors
- Lakes
- Laura Jean
- Letraset
- Maher Shalal Hash Baz
- Minimum Chips
- Molasses
- New Estate
- Ninetynine
- O!
- Panel Of Judges
- Pikelet
- Primitive Calculators
- Richard Lockwood
- Riot Guy
- Sachiko Kanenobu
- Sleepy Township
- Small World Experience
- Standish/Carlyon
- Sweet Whirl
- Sulk
- Tenniscoats
- The Ancients
- The Apartments
- The Stevens
- Totally Mild
- Tracey Read
- Tully
- Twerps
- Wagons
- Woelv

== See also ==
- List of record labels
