= Australian indie rock =

Genre of Australian rock music

Australian indie rock is part of the overall flow of Australian rock history but has a distinct history somewhat separate from mainstream rock in Australia, largely from the end of the punk rock era onwards.

== History ==
=== Beginnings ===
Rock and roll in Australia got started in the late 1950s and 1960s, influenced by the sounds coming from the United States and UK. Early on, the surf rock sound dominated, though in the mid-1960s, the beat genre from the UK had become established. Numerous garage bands formed in the cities and suburbs, and a vibrant musical culture began.

Isolated from the diversity of genres in the Northern Hemisphere, Australian mainstream record labels tried to replicate the success of trends imported from overseas and produce radio-friendly singles by successful artists such as John Farnham and the Easybeats. In the meantime, Russell Morris enjoyed a surprise hit with singles such as "The Real Thing". Produced by music legend Ian Molly Meldrum, and written by singing star Johnny Young, the single encompassed high production values and a psychedelic approach in its use of instruments such as a sitar, sampling of a children's choir, and its 6-minute running time (unusually long for the time). While released by EMI, this domestic production inspired a generation of bands, singers, and songwriters that home-grown Aussie talent could produce world-beating music. The single charted well in New York, Houston and Chicago.

=== Regional developments: 1970s to 1980s ===
==== Brisbane ====
The punk movement began in the mid-1970s, and resulted in an explosion of musical activity. Numerous bands formed, as did many independent record labels, often run out of bedrooms. An early band who gained a following in Australia were, the Saints, who grew out of Queensland and who recorded one of the first punk singles, releasing a single on vinyl before the Sex Pistols. Another important band who came out of Brisbane were the post-punk group the Go-Betweens, who relocated to Britain in the early 1980s and were one of the most acclaimed bands of the decade.

==== Sydney ====
Sydney's Radio Birdman were heavily inspired by acts such as the MC5 and the Stooges, and the band defined the sound of the punk and post-punk movement in Sydney. The sound of both Midnight Oil and INXS was influenced by Radio Birdman, especially in their early albums. In 1970s Sydney, the Australian Federal Government's "youth station" Double J operated outside the mainstream radio stations and began playing various independent acts from around the world. Double J (an AM station) eventually turned into Triple J (an FM station) in the early 1980s and began broadcasting nationally in 1989.

By the early 1980s Sydney had begun to eclipse the post-punk explosion of gloomy drug-addled Melbourne with its beach culture, summery pub music scene, and hubris. Phantom Records, a label which grew out of a popular import record store, began to record and distribute breakthrough indie acts such as the Hoodoo Gurus, the Sunnyboys and the Cockroaches. Phantom's success would inspire others to follow, with important indie champions, such as Died Pretty signed to the fledgling Citadel Label. Other labels, such as Waterfront Records, Hot Records and RooArt soon followed expanding opportunities for bands to record and release domestically. The number of venues exploded, and fueled by the expansion of FM radio and a prosperous economy, Sydney begun to prove that independent bands could make a healthy living on the pub music circuit at home, without having to first strike out to tour overseas and release internationally acclaimed albums. Other live indie bands from the 1980s era include the Hard-Ons, Celibate Rifles, New Christs, GANGgajang and the Rockmelons.

==== Perth ====
A vibrant and interesting punk and post-punk scene also developed in Perth, Western Australia. Bands such as The Victims and Cheap Nasties, spawned icons of the Australian music scene such as Dave Faulkner and James Baker, who formed one of the most popular Australian bands of the 1980s, the power-pop band Hoodoo Gurus, and the legendary Kim Salmon, who formed the Scientists, an influence on bands such as Mudhoney and The Jesus Lizard. Kim Salmon claims to have been the first person to use the term grunge to describe music. Kim Salmon and James Baker later once again collaborated in the underground rock supergroup Beasts of Bourbon, also featuring Tex Perkins and Spencer P. Jones. Perth also spawned the critically acclaimed indie-rock band The Triffids.

==== Melbourne ====
Melbourne's post-punk scene was much more experimental than any of the other capital cities. The city spawned a lot of experimental and gothic rock, of which Nick Cave's band, the Boys Next Door (later to become the Birthday Party) was the most notable and influential.

Soon the raw energy of punk evolved into post punk, which combined the DIY ethos of punk with rule-breaking, genre-defying artistic experimentation. The profusion of small, defiantly non-commercial and often unhesitatingly experimental bands became known as the "little band scene". An all-women feminist band, Girls' Garage Band, was founded in 1979 and evolved into Toxic Shock in 1980. Throughout the 1980s, it flourished in most Australian major cities, evolving around venues (such as Melbourne's Seaview Ballroom) and community radio stations such as 3RRR. A few bands, like Models, crossed over to the mainstream; others, like The Birthday Party went on to achieve critical acclaim abroad.

This era can be said to have ended in the 1990s, when in the wake of the explosion of grunge, alternative music became mainstream. Major labels signed three-chord grunge/punk-style rock bands, commercial radio played them and the 'alternative' sound soon became ubiquitous, ultimately culminating in manufactured pop groups, styled to sound raucously 'alternative' and appearing on television commercials for mobile phones. In this way, this process of mainstreaming echoes what happened in the USA and UK.

==== Gold Coast ====
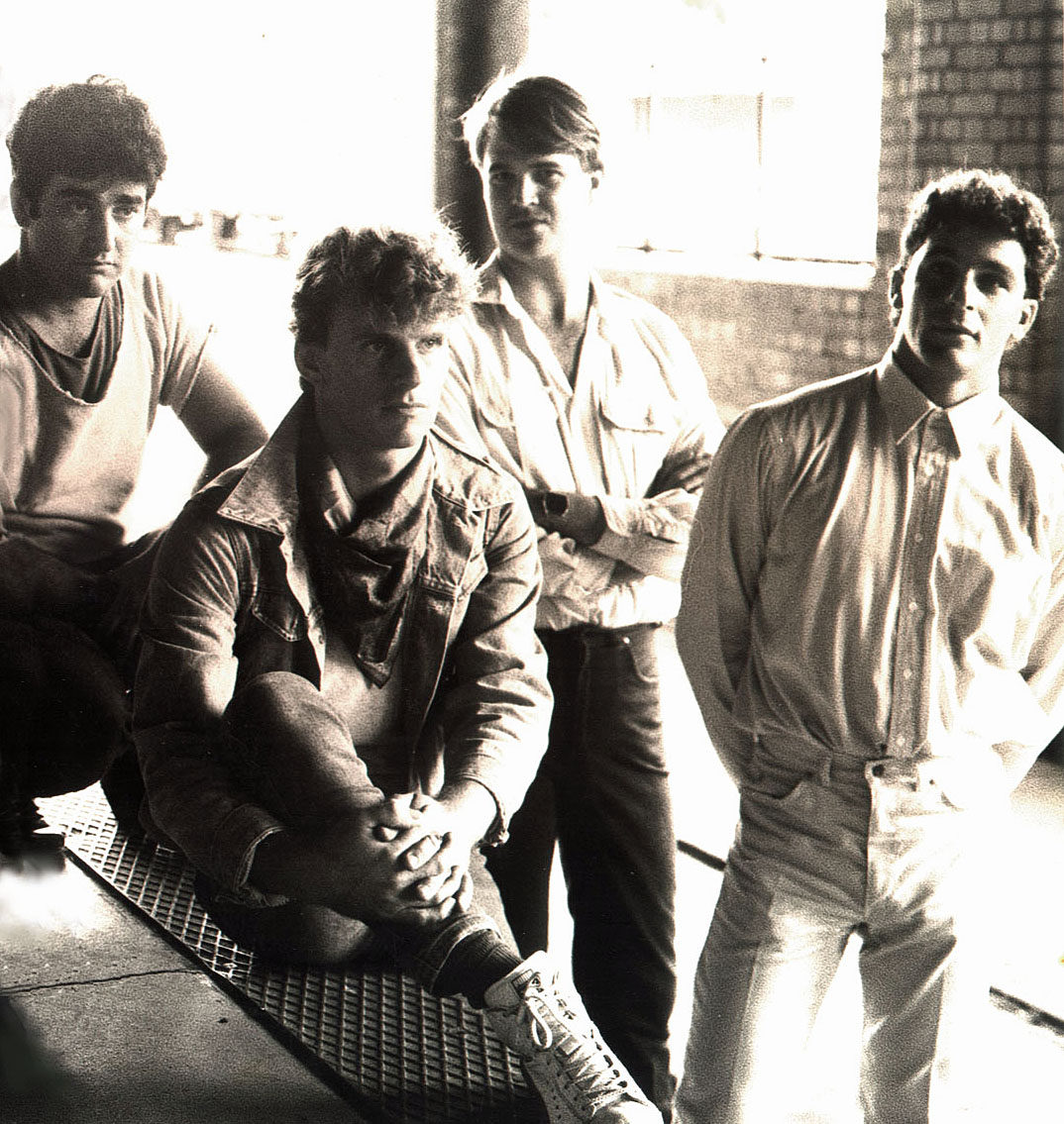
The Seven Ballerinas, February 1982; from left to right, Mario Spina, John Smethurst, Michael Palmer, and John Hippocrates.

A small but active Indie Rock movement was evident on the Gold Coast in the late 1970s and early 1980s. The Seven Ballerinas were an Australian Indie rock band from the Gold Coast, active from 1981 to 1984. They are a significant contributor to the alternative rock music scene on the Gold Coast, Brisbane and Sydney, being one of the first bands from the Gold Coast to perform original material to audiences Australia wide.

The Ballerinas was formed in 1981 on the Gold Coast from an amalgamation of two pre-existing new-wave bands, Ratpak and The Strand. At the time, there was a mood for change on the Gold Coast music scene, as seen at the Macintosh Island concert, attended by around 2,000 people was headlined by The Strand, and also included Ratpak and several other local bands. The Macintosh Island concert was a turning point in Gold Coast music. As noted at the time, it was a move away from disco, and towards a local sound that expressed the values and attitudes of Gold Coast youth.

=== 1990s to the present ===
The mainstreaming of alternative music did not kill indie rock in Australia, though did signal a shift in its focus. The form of 'alternative' music that the major labels and commercial radio stations were interested in was predominantly three-chord rock informed by punk rock and Seattle-style grunge; loud, rebellious, and easily marketable to a generation of teenagers. Bands who did not fit this manifest were largely left behind by this process, and did attract smaller audiences (predominantly in their 20s and based in bohemian inner urban areas). In inner Melbourne, a considerable post rock scene flourished, with bands like Art of Fighting, Laura, Silver Ray and Gersey playing more subdued music using the traditional guitar/bass/drums structure; bands in this scene often played at inner-city venues such as the Punters Club and the Empress Hotel. Other bands, such as The Paradise Motel explored the more cinematic scope of string sections combined with guitar/bass/drums, especially on debut recordings such as Left Over Life To Kill. Meanwhile, others explored alternative instrumentation, including accordions, strings and chromatic percussion. In the early 2000s, a notable alternative and experimental music scene began out of Sydney, including acts such as The Captain's Package, Rica Tetas, Slimey Things and Darth Vegas.

Several indie labels of note have operated in Australia around this time. Chapter Music, established by Guy Blackman in Perth but later relocated to Melbourne, released recordings on both vinyl and CD by a wide range of artists, including Panel Of Judges and Sleepy Township, as well as a compilation of Australian 1970s/1980s post punk titled Can't Stop It. Sydney's Half A Cow, run by Nic Dalton, released albums by bands like Dalton's own Sneeze, Spdfgh, and Sydney shoegazers Swirl. Fitzroy-based Trifekta, run by Tom Larnach-Jones (and distributed by major label Festival Mushroom Records) also released recordings by various more established Melbourne bands, including the beings, Ninetynine, Minimum Chips, Gersey and Architecture in Helsinki, as well as local releases of international bands like Life Without Buildings. More recently, Tasmanian-cum-Melbourne label Unstable Ape Records have been releasing many recordings by independent local bands such as Love of Diagrams, Sir and the Bird Blobs.

== See also ==
- Music of Australia
