= Sea Haggs =

1990s Australian indie rock band

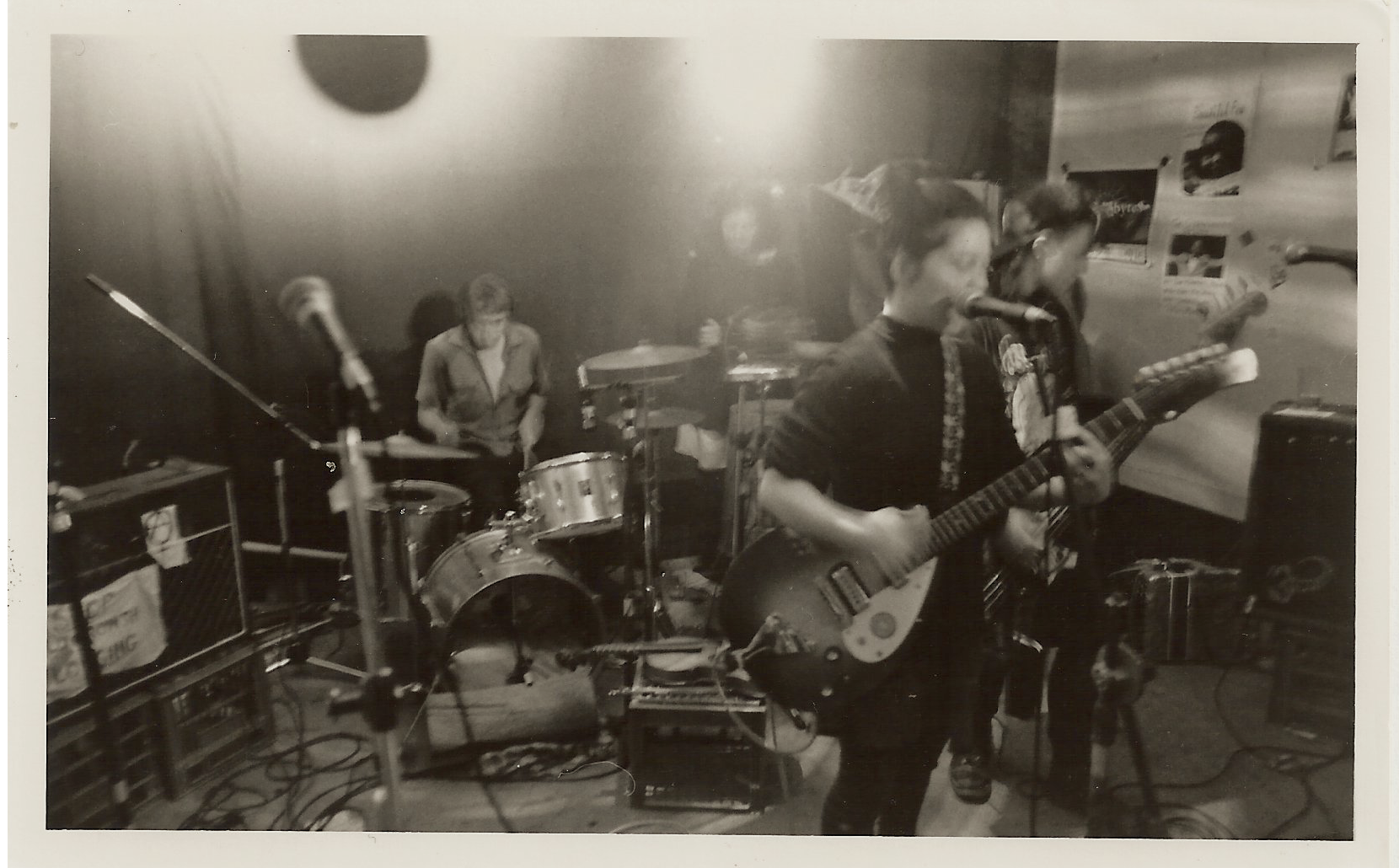
- Sea Haggs in 1994

Background information
- Origin: Melbourne, Australia
- Years active: 1992–1995
- Labels: Woozy
- Past members: Laura MacFarlane; Cameron Potts; Iain McIntyre; Yvette Pusser; Ben Butler; Nicole

The Sea Haggs were an indie rock band formed in Melbourne, Australia in 1991 by Perth expatriates Laura MacFarlane on guitar, viola, percussion and vocals with Iain McIntyre on guitar, bass and vocals, and Cameron Potts on drums. The band also featured other members, including Yvette Pusser (bass) Nicole (drums) and Ben Butler (percussion). Towards the end of its career, the band also recorded under the name Keckle.

In 1995, the band was wound up when MacFarlane moved to Seattle to join Sleater-Kinney. A compilation of Sea Haggs and Keckle recordings, along with some of MacFarlane's solo work, appeared then under the name "Jelly CD", released by McIntyre's Woozy zine/imprint.

MacFarlane, Potts and McIntyre later went on to form ninetynine.

== Members ==
- Laura MacFarlane – guitar, viola, percussion, vocals
- Iain McIntyre – guitar, bass, vocals
- Cameron Potts – drums
- Yvette Pusser – guitar, bass, vocals
- Nicole – drums
- Ben Butler – percussion

== Discography ==
- Beastie (1993)
- Jelly (1995)
