= Cameron Potts =

Australian musician

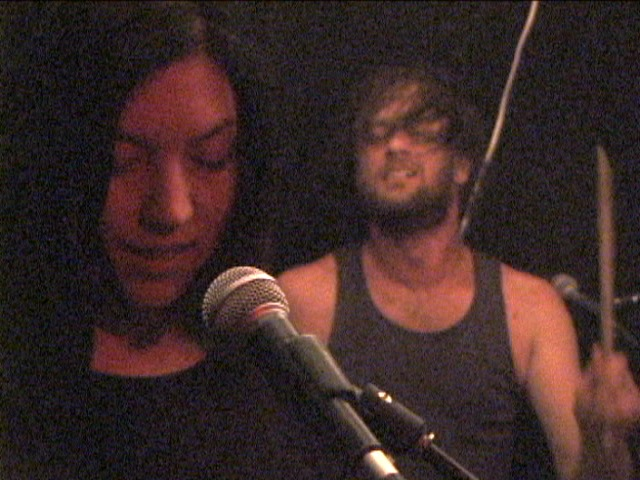
- Potts (right) performing with Laura MacFarlane at Cake Shop, New York City

Background information
- Born: 10 November 1971 (age 54); Subiaco, Western Australia, Australia
- Origin: Perth, Western Australia, Australia
- Genres: Rock
- Occupations: Musician, photographer, author
- Instruments: Drums, violin
- Years active: 1988–present

Cameron Potts (born 10 November 1971) is an Australian musician based in Melbourne. Since 1999, he has toured regularly to the United States, Canada, Europe, Mexico, Japan, Taiwan, China, Malaysia, Scandinavia and Iceland with both Ninetynine, playing drums, and Baseball, playing violin. His band Cuba Is Japan toured the Far East in 2009. and a 5 date tour of China supporting Angie Hart. He is not to be confused with Sydney musician Cameron Potts, lead singer and guitarist of Dead Letter Chorus.

== Biography ==
=== Early Years (Perth 1971-1992) ===
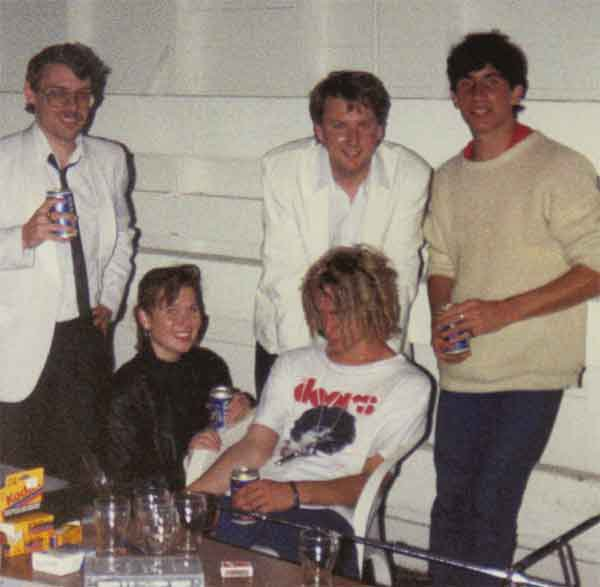
Bad News post gig at the 1989 Claremont School of Arts Ball, A Shed, Fremantle

Potts is originally from Perth, and started playing drums in 1987. He played in several bands in Perth. His first band Bad News (later Poetic Justice, with brother Jason Potts, Greg Periera, Richard Mortimer and Amy Carney, daughter of Bernard Carney) played the 1989 Claremont School of Art dance as the professional debut.

He later joined and recorded with Thou Gideon and Manic Pizza before re-locating to Melbourne in 1992.

=== Melbourne (1992–2020) ===
In 1994 Potts joined with Gareth Edwards to form Sandro, with Edwards on guitar and vocals and Nick Carroll on bass. Sandro released its first album, Live by Rivers in November 1996, which was followed by tours with Palace Brothers, Dirty Three and Smog, later releasing Hate Songs in 1997. The album attracted significant national airplay from Triple J, press in Rolling Stone and Juice and national airplay for the "Rainy Season" clip on Rage, Channel V and MTV. After a tour of the United States built around the completion of Sandro's third album, The Flux, Potts left the band playing his last show with them in New York. Returning home, he then went on to join Ninetynine, which was initially established as a solo side project by Sleater Kinney drummer Laura MacFarlane and Rhonda Simmonds. They recorded the band's second album, 767, with Simmonds on bass; Potts and MacFarlane sharing drums, vibraphone, and Casiotone keyboards; and MacFarlane on guitars, vocals, and xylophone. Simmonds left to join Origami and was replaced by Iain McIntyre and Michelle Mansford. A 75 date tour of the US, Canada and Europe followed, and with this lineup they recorded the album, 180°, in 2000. Mansford left after another long international tour in late 2001 and replaced by Amy Clarke (formerly of Vivian Girls). The band recorded with producer Lindsey Gravina releasing The Process in 2002. They also that year released a compilation of rarities and odd 7" B-Sides, Anatomy of Distance. Following this was another long tour of Europe and Japan. Clarke left Ninetynine in 2006 after the release of Worlds of Space, Worlds of Population, Worlds of Robots and was replaced by Meg Butler, with further touring to the US, Canada and Mexico, including a recording session at Motown studios in Detroit.

On his third trip to Egypt in 2001, he acquired his first violin, an event that eventually led to the formation of Baseball, a Middle East influenced fusion band. During a stint in Scotland he met Monika Fikerle (Love of Diagrams) in November 2002 and with bassist, Steve Begovich, they toured Europe, Scandinavia and Japan. After returning from overseas, the group began recording their first album, Gods and Stars, Priests and Kings, with new bassist and keyboardist, Yoshi Araki in mid-2003. In November of that year, Baseball returned to Europe with Love of Diagrams, playing 28 shows across eleven countries, finishing in Osaka, Japan. Araki was not allowed re-entry into Australia and so Baseball underwent the line up change in early 2005 that would cement the foundings for the rest of their career. Ben Butcher joined to play guitar (ex Jihad Against America) and Evelyn Morris joined on drums (Pikelet/True Radical Miracle). Now a four piece with Monika switching from Piano Accordion to bass, and Potts solely on violin and vocals, they were invited to play at the Hohaiyan Rock Concert in Taiwan and released an EP, Taiwan/Japan Tour EP in 2005. In 2007, the group recorded Animal Kingdom at Head Gap in Melbourne and then undertook an extensive self-funded tour of Europe, taking in Finland, Russia, Estonia, Latvia, Lithuania, Germany, Czech Republic, Austria, Slovenia, and Croatia, before heading into Italy, Spain, France, Ireland and the UK. 2008 finally saw the release of the band's second album, Animal Kingdom, and three separate national tours followed: one with The Mountain Goats, another with Snowman and their own set of dates to launch the album. Original guitarist Steve Begovich died from MS complications in 2008 and by the start of 2009, the band began to focus on other projects with Potts forming Cuba is Japan, Fikerle performing with Love of Diagrams and Morris with Pikelet. In 2011 Baseball played their first show in three years, a fundraiser for Japanese earthquake victims, in Melbourne.

Potts has played in a number of other Melbourne bands including: Crank, Peachfuzz, Trippin Phil's All Ska's, Sea Haggs, Manic Pizza, and Perth group Thou Gideon,

In 2012 his group membership included Cuba is Japan, Montero (with Guy Blackman, Geoff O'Connor and Ben Montero) and High Tea which includes former Baseball guitarist Ben Butcher, guitarist Kim Sills and Cuba is Japan violinist/keyboardist James Heenan playing bass. He is also a session drummer in Melbourne, playing on Regurgitator's 2010 EP Distractions and performing live with Japanese Avant Garde Legends Boredoms. He also played on Nick Allbrook's (Pond/Tame Impala) solo album Pure Gardiya (2015).

=== Perth (2020 - current) ===
Potts moved back to Perth in 2020, to concentrate on art and writing, he was involved in the Poetic Justice reunion after 31 years.

== Other activities ==
Potts is a graduate of Perth's Claremont School of Art, majoring in painting. He has exhibited and sold photographs from his world travels. Published works are a children's book In Fitzroy, The Flowers Grew So High (1993). and a collection of poems called A Headache of Happiness (1995).

Potts is also a writer and photographer.

== Discography ==
=== with Thou Gideon ===
- see Internet Archive

=== with Peachfuzz ===
- V8 – Independent (Fuzz1) (1993)
- Watermelon Man - (1994)
- E.Coli – (Ka 001)) (1995)

=== with Baseball ===
- "Baseball/Ricaine" - 7" single (1995)
- "The Velvet Robe of Corrosion" - 7" single (1995)
- Gods And Stars, Priests And Kings – Independent (2003)
- Taiwan/Japan Tour EP – (2005)
- Animal Kingdom – (STMPCD014) (23 February 2008)

=== with Sandro ===
- Live By Rivers – Candle/Choozy (November 1996)
- "Work Your Days Away/Afternoon Comes Round" - 7" Single, Thirsty Arab Records (1996)
- Hate Songs – Brass Companion/MDS (December 1997)
- The Flux - MGP Recordings/Distribution (1999)

=== with Ninetynine ===
- 767 – Patsy (Patsy 002) (1998)
- 180° – Patsy (Patsy 007) (2000)
- Anatomy of Distance – StickFigure (Stick.9CD) (2001)
- The Process – Unstable Ape (UARR007) (2002)
- Worlds of Space, Worlds of Population, Worlds of Robots – (2006)
- Band Magnetique – (Patsy, 2010)
- "Further / Curfew" single - (2016)

=== with Cuba is Japan ===
- "Pigafetta's Dream"/"The Conflict at Mactan" – (Alpine Areas, 2011)

=== with Regurgitator ===
- Distractions EP (2010)

=== with Nick Allbrook ===
- Pure Gardiya (2015)

== Bibliography ==
- Potts, Cameron (1993). In Fitzroy, the flowers grew so high. Melbourne, VIC: United Artists. ISBN 0-646-12336-X.
- Potts, Cameron (1995). A Headache of Happiness. Melbourne, VIC. ISBN 0-646-26886-4.
