= Baseball (band) =

Australian indie punk band

- Origin: Melbourne, Victoria, Australia
- Genres: Punk rock, anarcho-punk, indie punk, post-punk, experimental
- Years active: 1995–2010, 2016–present
- Labels: Warm Cola Recordings, Thirsty Arab, Stomp
- Members: See "Band members"
- Past members: See "Past Band members"

Baseball are an Australian indie punk band formed by mainstay front man, Cameron Potts, on lead vocals and violin, in 1995. Their influences range from Eastern European and Middle-Eastern Gypsy music and Sufi poetry to bands like The Ex, the Pixies and Led Zeppelin. They disbanded in 2010 and reformed late in 2016.

== History ==
Baseball started as a solo project for front man, Cameron Potts (Ninetynine, Sandro) throughout the late 1990s and early 2000s, recording tracks influenced by his travels through the middle east using piano, drums and often whispered vocals. Cameron began working closely with Monika Fikerle on drums and piano accordion and Steve Begovich on bass, touring Europe together in 2002. Returning to Melbourne in Cameron and Monika were joined by Japanese bassist and drummer Yoshi-Nobu Araki to record the Gods and Stars, Priests And Kings album.

Baseball evolved to the current line-up in 2005, consisting of bass player Monika Fikerle (Love of Diagrams, Sea Scouts), drummer/vocalist Evelyn Morris (Pikelet, True Radical Miracle) and guitarist Ben Butcher (The Assassination Collective).

In 2005, Baseball released a five-song EP of demo tunes titled "Taiwan – Japan Tour EP" for their tour of Japan and Taiwan where they played the Hohaiyan Rock Festival with Black Rebel Motorcycle Club, Vincent Gallo and more, and where Cameron Potts smashed his violin at the end of the set.

After touring Europe and Far East Asia in 2005, Baseball toured Russia, the US, the UK, Scandinavia and continental Europe in June 2006. They again toured Europe and the UK in June/July 2007.

In 2006, a live show was filmed on 3 cameras at Bar Open, Melbourne, featuring Baseball, The Thaw (Sydney), ni-hao! (Japan) and Sabot (Czech Republic). The show was later released on DVD by Tenzenmen (009TZM), entitled "Live at Bar Open". In 2006, Baseball played support to the likes of Sleater-Kinney, Saul Williams, Les Savy Fav, Amateur Party, Birushanah (Jap) and Ryokuchi (Jap).

The band took a break from 2010 before returning to playing and writing new songs in September 2016.

== Members ==
- Cameron Potts, leads vocals, violin (also a member of Ninetynine, Sandro, High Tea)
- Monika Fikerle, vocals, bass, drums (also a member of Love of Diagrams and Sea Scouts)
- Evelyn Morris, vocals, bass, drums (also a member of True Radical Miracle, Pikelet)
- Ben Butcher, vocals, guitar (also a member of The Assassination Collective, Paul Kidney Experience, High Tea, Star/Time)

== Past members ==
- Yoshi-Nobu Araki, bass and guitar 2003 (playing on Gods and Stars, Priests and Kings)
- Steve Begovich, bass 2002-2003

== Discography ==
=== Albums ===
- The Sea Is Blue and Green (Songs of Travel Loss and Hope) (Warm Cola Recordings, 1999)
- Gods and Stars, Priests and Kings (Thirsty Arab, 2003)
- Animal Kingdom (Stomp STMPCD014, 2008)

=== Extended plays ===
- Taiwan-Japan Tour (2005)

=== Singles ===
- "Run, Run, Run" / "The Synagogue of Wooden Nerves" (Split 7" single with Ricaine, 1995)
