= Laura MacFarlane =

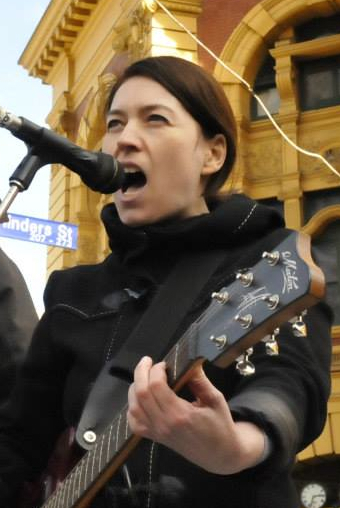
- Performing at Flinders St Station, November 2014

Background information
- Born: Laura Sandra MacFarlane; Glasgow, Scotland
- Origin: Perth, Western Australia, Australia
- Genres: Indie rock
- Occupations: Musician; Audio engineer Fanzine publisher Teacher
- Instruments: Vocals, guitar, drums, bass guitar, keyboards, trumpet, viola, vibraphone, xylophone
- Years active: 1988–present
- Label: Patsy
- Website: lauramacfarlanemusic.com

Laura Sandra MacFarlane (also credited as Lora MacFarlane) is a Scottish-born Australian multi-instrumentalist, singer, songwriter and audio engineer. Since 1996 she is the founding mainstay of the Australian indie rock band, ninetynine. MacFarlane also performs solo and has been in other bands, including as an early drummer and singer with United States rock group, Sleater-Kinney (1994–96).

== Biography ==
Laura Sandra MacFarlane is from Glasgow, Scotland. Her parents are George MacFarlane (1936–2006) and Patricia "Patsy" MacFarlane. She has two older siblings and one daughter. The MacFarlane family migrated to Perth in October 1978. George was an accomplished musician, and had played trombone and percussion instruments with British and Australian army bands.

MacFarlane began her interest in music as a child, playing vibraphone and trumpet. She went on to receive a music scholarship at Perth Modern School, for vocals and percussion, and later studied music at The University of Western Australia. MacFarlane began performing in independent bands in Perth from 1988 onwards. She was the main songwriter in the Brautigans from 1989 to 1991, performing vocals, guitar and vibraphone. She performed in other local bands, including Halcyon Days on drums and Louder than God, which had an extensive line-up of ten members, co-founded by Iain McIntyre.

MacFarlane then joined Manic Pizza, on bass guitar and vocals, with Gareth Edwards (Sandro) on guitar and Cameron Potts on drums. As a member of Manic Pizza, MacFarlane relocated to Melbourne in the early 1990s. Edwards later told René Schaefer, of Mess+Noise website, that "Cameron was heavily into the Pixies at the time. I was a Hüsker Dü freak. Laura provided the actual talent." In 1992, MacFarlane formed Sea Haggs (later renamed Keckle) on guitar, viola, percussion and vocals, with McIntyre and Potts. That group's material was later included on a compilation album, Jelly (1995).

In 1992, MacFarlane began publishing Woozy fanzine with McIntyre. Woozy was a self-published fanzine, with a DIY philosophy, that promoted local Melbourne and Australian bands, as well as international underground acts and grassroots politics. Woozy produced over 20 publications from 1992 to 2002. In 1996, MacFarlane also co-founded, with McIntyre, Choozy independent distribution (1996–2002), which distributed music, fanzines and small publications within Australia and overseas.

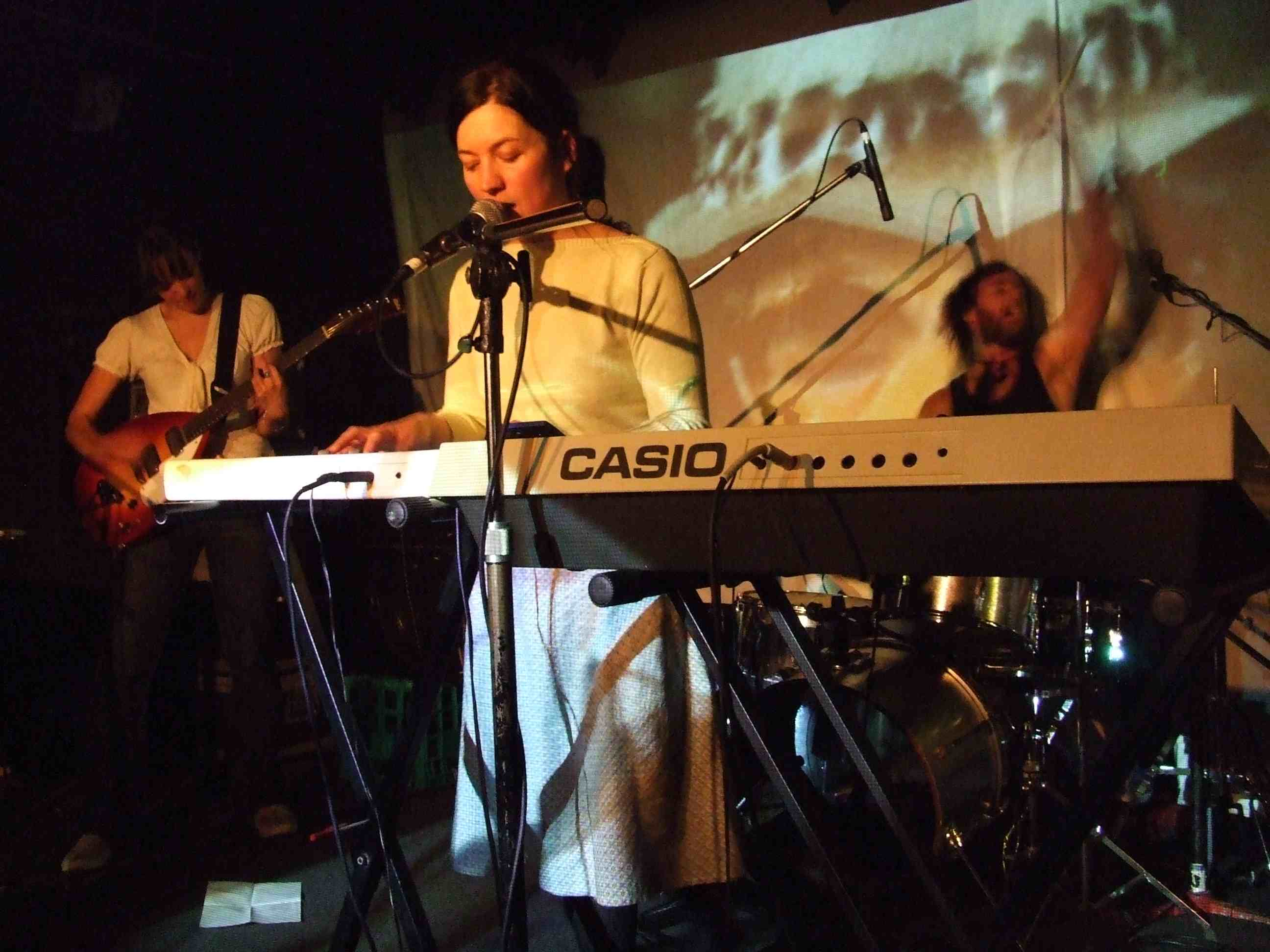
MacFarlane on keyboards and vocals with ninetynine, Northcote Social Club, 2007

MacFarlane began playing drums and vocals in 1994 with visiting United States rock group, Sleater-Kinney, and in 1995 she went to Olympia and Seattle to tour and record with the band. She is the drummer, co-producer and co-writer on their self-titled debut album, Sleater-Kinney. She is also lead singer and guitarist on the track "Lora's Song". MacFarlane provided drums, backup vocals and guitar (track 12) on their follow up album, Call the Doctor (March 1996).

In 1996, MacFarlane returned to Melbourne and founded an indie rock band, ninetynine, initially as a solo project, playing all the instruments on the debut album, 99 (October 1996). Her project soon became a band, including Potts (from 1997) and McIntyre (from 2000). By 2010, ninetynine had released eight albums, and toured the world several times. The band celebrated their 20th anniversary with the release of Further in 2016. MacFarlane founded her own record label, Patsy, which issued ninetynine material, as well as that by the bands Sea Scouts, Fiona Beverage, Boo Who, Baseball, Trixies Undersea Adventure, and Vivian Girls.

MacFarlane has played a variety of instruments on a number of records, including vibraphone, drums, guitar, keyboard and vocals. She has worked with other artists, including Lee Memorial (alongside Karl Smith of Sodastream), Bombazine Black, The Wonder, Winterborn, Tarantula, New Buffalo, Trixies Undersea Adventure, Boo Who, Popemobile, Dragster, Scared of Horses, Cold Cold Hearts, Madigan, Disaster Plan, Clag, and Low Talk.

MacFarlane has worked as audio engineer at 3CR Melbourne radio, and on many recordings, including solo work, recent ninetynine releases, Covens Revenge, The Hatchets, Cleber Claux Memorial Singers, Baseball, Love of Diagrams, The Stabs, and Jules Sheldon. MacFarlane is also a teacher and educator of music, establishing Augment Music Education in 2016. She is based in Melbourne, and still plays as a member of ninetynine, as well as performing solo.

In 2020, during the Melbourne Covid lockdown, MacFarlane started the Vivid Recording Project, which was a series of three EPs that featured a specific instrument, and only that instrument, with vocals. The EPs were Into the Metalude (vibraphone), The Narrows (guitar) and Future Obscura (Casio keyboards). Their initial releases were in conjunction with the Bandcamp Fridays, held to assist music artists during the pandemic. In 2021, the whole project was released as the album ViViD.

== Discography ==
=== Ninetynine ===
- The Triantiwontigongolo – Ninetynine EP CD 1996 (Woozy)
- 99 CD 1996 (Patsy/Endearing)
- 767 CD and LP Album 1998 (Patsy/Endearing/Chapter)
- Girl Crazy – Woekender LP 1998 (Remedial Records)
- Ersatz Split 7" 1999 (Radio One)
- 180 Degrees CD and LP 2000 (Patsy/ Radio One)
- Vivian Girls Split 7" 2001 (Chapter)
- Anatomy of Distance CD 2002 (Patsy/Stckfigure)
- The Process CD and LP 2002 (Trifekta/Appliances & Cars)
- Receiving the Sounds of Science Fiction CD EP 2003 (Dark Beloved Cloud)
- World of Space World of Population World of Robots CD 2006 (UAR/Stickfigure)
- Chapter 99 – Compilation CD 2006 (Sones)
- Silo EP 2008 (Patsy)
- Bande Magnetique CD 2010 (Patsy)
- Woods 7" 2016 (Patsy)
- Further 7" and CD 2016 (Patsy)

=== Laura MacFarlane ===
- Into The Metalude EP 2020 (Patsy)
- The Narrows EP 2020 (Patsy)
- Future Obscura EP 2020 (Patsy)
- ViViD Album 2021 (Patsy)

=== Sleater-Kinney ===
- Sleater-Kinney 1995 CD LP (VVK /Chainsaw)
- Call the Doctor 1996 CD LP (Chainsaw)
- Start Together 2014 CD LP (Subpop)

=== Other ===
- The Brautigans – Walk Along the Waterfront/Homecoming 1991 Cassette single
- The Brautigans – Scar-red 1991 Cassette Album
- Manic Pizza – Deep Pan Delivery 1991 CassetteAlbum
- The Sea Haggs – Beastie 1993 Cassette EP
- The Sea Haggs – Jelly 1995 CD (Woozy)
- Dragster – Dragster CD LP 1996 (Little Teddy/Hoppel Di Hoy)
- Popemobile – The Triantiwontigongolo CD 1996 (Woozy)
- Pip Proud – Matildas You Fiend LP 1996 (BBAPTC)
- Madigan – Rock Stop 1996 CD LP (Moon Puss)
- Cold Cold Hearts – Yer So Sweet (Baby Donut) 7" 1996 (Kill Rock Stars)
- Casini – Woozy 20 Compilation CD 1997 (Woozy)
- Bruna – Lumber CD 1998 (Bun)
- Scared of Horses – An Empty Flight CD 1998 (Brass Companion)
- Sea Scouts – Beacon of Hope 1998 (Patsy)
- The Cat's Miaow – The Long Goodbye 10" (Darla Records)
- Boo Who – Tigers Are Better Looking 2000 (Patsy)
- Trixie Undersea Adventure – Life Raft CD 2001 (Patsy Radio One)
- Small Sips – Morning Ripples CD 2006 (Rogue Records)
- Up For Grabs movie soundtrack – Count with Kevin 2007 (Up For Grabs)
- Lee Memorial – The Lives of Lee Memorial CD 2009 (Dot Dash)
- Tunnel Vision Song Contest – No Tunnel No Way Single 2014
- Covens Revenge – Covens Revenge CD 2017 (Backyard Charlies)
- Sodastream – Letter From Melbourne Single 2020
