= The Devil Has My Double =

Studio album by Jane Badler
- Released: June 1, 2008
- Recorded: 2008
- Length: 46:32
- Label: Unstable Ape Records

The Devil Has My Double is the debut album by American singer Jane Badler, released on June 1, 2008. On the album she collaborates with the Melbourne band Sir.

== Track listing ==
1. "When We Got High" - 5:04
2. "Who Did You Wear That Dress For" - 3:17
3. "I Love Everything" - 5:43
4. "The Devil Has My Double" - 3:21
5. "Everybody Know My Secrets" - 6:27
6. "I Never Throw Anything Away" - 3:53
7. "Single Tonight" - 4:22
8. "A Dream Only Lasts" - 3:24
9. "Tears Are Made of Water" - 3:01
10. "The Doll That Cries Real Tears" - 3:56
11. "True Love Is a Bore" - 3:59

== External sources ==
- http://www.uar.com.au/uar/releases/uar059.htm
