= Pattern recognition (disambiguation) =

Pattern recognition is a field in machine learning.

Pattern recognition may also refer to:

- Pattern recognition (psychology), identification of faces, objects, words, melodies, etc.
- Pattern Recognition (novel), a 2003 novel by William Gibson
- Pattern Recognition, an album by Sea Scouts
- "Pattern Recognition", a song by Sonic Youth from Sonic Nurse
- "Pattern Recognition", a song by Neuro-sama from Full Code
- Pattern Recognition (journal)
