= Slow Song =

Slow Song may refer to:

- "Slow Song", a song by Baboon from Ed Lobster, 1991
- "Slow Song", a song by Sleater-Kinney from Sleater-Kinney, 1995
- "A Slow Song", by Joe Jackson, 1982
- "The Slow Song", a song by Amy Shark from Love Monster, 2018
- Sentimental ballad

== See also ==
- Slow dance
