= Taste test =

Taste Test may refer to:

- "Taste Test", a song by Sleater-Kinney from their 1996 album Call the Doctor
- Blind wine tasting, a wine taste test involving no knowledge of the wine's identity on the part of the tasters
- Blind taste test, a generic term for any blind testing that involves tasting
- Food taster, a term used for a person who tastes food for safety or quality reasons
