= Sea Scouts (disambiguation) =

Sea Scouts are members of the Scout movement, with a particular emphasis on water-based activities.

Sea Scouts may also refer to:

- Sea Scouts (band), an Australian noise rock band
- Sea Scouts (film), a 1939 Donald Duck cartoon short
