= The Seven Ballerinas =

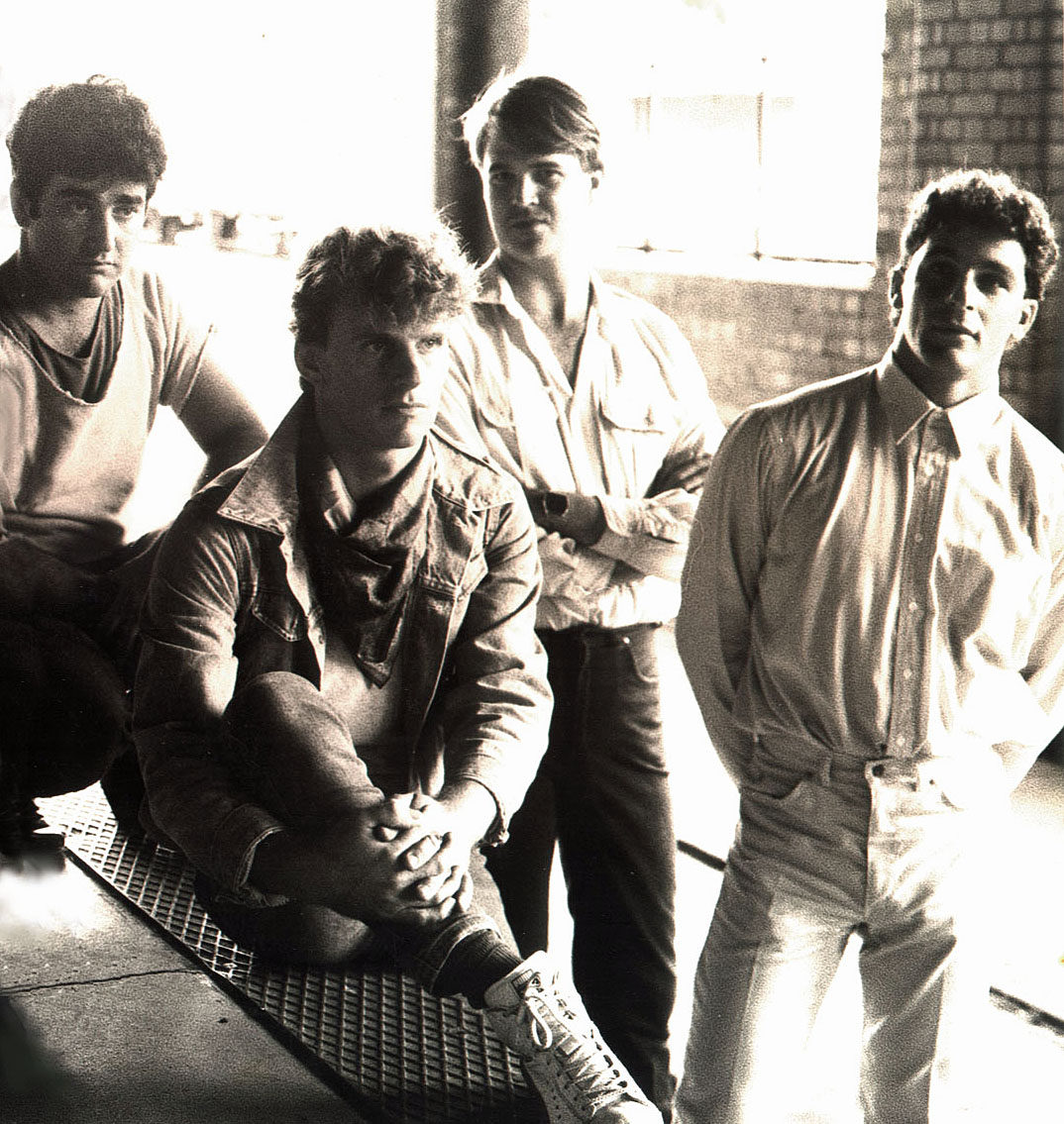
- The Seven Ballerinas, February 1982; from left to right, Mario Spina, John Smethurst, Michael Palmer, and John Hippocrates.

Background information
- Origin: Gold Coast, Queensland, Australia
- Years active: 1981–1984

The Seven Ballerinas are an Australian indie rock band from the Gold Coast, Queensland, active from 1981 to 1984. They are a significant contributor to the alternative rock music scene on the Gold Coast, Brisbane and Sydney, being one of the first bands from the Gold Coast to perform original material to audiences Australia wide. Their early work received recognition by independent radio stations in Brisbane and Sydney, notably 4ZZZ and 2JJ. As their influence grew, commercial FM radio also played the Ballerinas, as evidenced by their inclusion on Triple M Brisbane's Volume 1 compilation Homegrown LP of local South East Queensland bands in 1982. The original members of the Seven Ballerinas included John Smethurst (vocals and guitar, formerly of Ratpak), Michael Palmer (guitar, formerly of The Strand), Mario Spina (bass, formerly of Ratpak), Nigel Baker (keyboards, formerly of Ratpak) and Billy Pommer Jr (drums). Nigel Baker left the band in 1981. John Hippocrates replaced Billy Pommer Jr on drums in 1981.

== Origins ==
The band was formed in 1981 on the Gold Coast from an amalgamation of two pre-existing new-wave bands, Ratpak and The Strand. At the time, there was a mood for change on the Gold Coast music scene, as seen at the Macintosh Island concert (between Surfers Paradise and Main Beach). The concert, attended by around 2,000 people was headlined by The Strand, and also included Ratpak and several other local bands. The Macintosh Island concert was a turning point in Gold Coast music. As noted at the time, it was a move away from disco, and towards a local sound that expressed the values and attitudes of Gold Coast youth.

== Recording history ==
The Seven Ballerinas recorded their first independent single in Sydney in 1981. It was a double "A" sided self-produced 45 on the EMI Custom label, consisting of two originals "Circles" and "Sometimes I Feel". In 1982 the band again entered the studio, this time under the guidance of a record company and producers to record what was intended to be their first commercial single release, Falling Tear. By the mutual agreement of the band, producer and record executives, the single was not released. The band continued to record independently from 1982 to 1984. The final recordings were done in 1991 with John Smethurst (vocals and guitar), Michael Palmer (guitar), Chris Bailey (bass), JJ Harris (drums).

== Performance history ==
The Ballerinas’ debut performance was at the Miami Hotel on the Gold Coast on 26 June 1981.

From 1981 to 1984 the Ballerinas performed at various venues along the East coast of Australia. On the Gold Coast, they appeared at the Playroom, Bombay Rock and The Jet Club. In Brisbane, they performed at The New York, The Aussie Nash and 279 Club. In Sydney, it was the Manzil Room in Kings Cross, Bondi Tram, Stranded, The Governor's Pleasure, Trade Union Club and Carmen's at Miranda. The Ballerinas also performed at several festivals, including the Summer Jam Festival on the Gold Coast in January 1983 where they performed the single "Alone on a bridge" to an audience of several thousand. The Ballerinas also supported a number of touring international acts, including Simple Minds, The Birthday Party and Ultravox. In 1984, by mutual agreement the band decided to cease regular live performances, however they continued to record and perform the occasional one-off show.

== Post-band history ==
In the years following, Mario Spina became a member of "The Ballistics", "Damn Motors", "Bossanova Kids", "The Tellers" and "the Burning Well". He died in December 2004. John Hippocrates became a member of "The Ballistics", "Damn Motors", "Bossanova Kids", "The Tellers" and "the Burning Well". in 2011 John formed Redglo with Patrick Keyzer (guitar, formerly of "the Snapdragons" and "Jet Powers and the Byronic Tragi-Heroes") and Suzie O'Toole bass, formerly of "Just Add Water" and "Bitch". Redglo released a CD in 2013 after supporting the Sunnyboys on their comeback tour, in May at the Coolangatta Hotel. Jeff Harris, who played drums for the Ballerinas on their final shows, joined "Divinyls". Michael Palmer was replaced by Chris Bailey (formerly of the Angels and GANGgajang) for the final shows. Glenn Beard, a casual keyboard player for the band's live shows, died in 2008. Nigel Baker played keyboards with Mario Spina and John Hippocrates in "the Burning Well" (1998).
