= Zulya Kamalova =

Tatar musician (1969–2024)

Zulya Kamalova Зуля Камалова
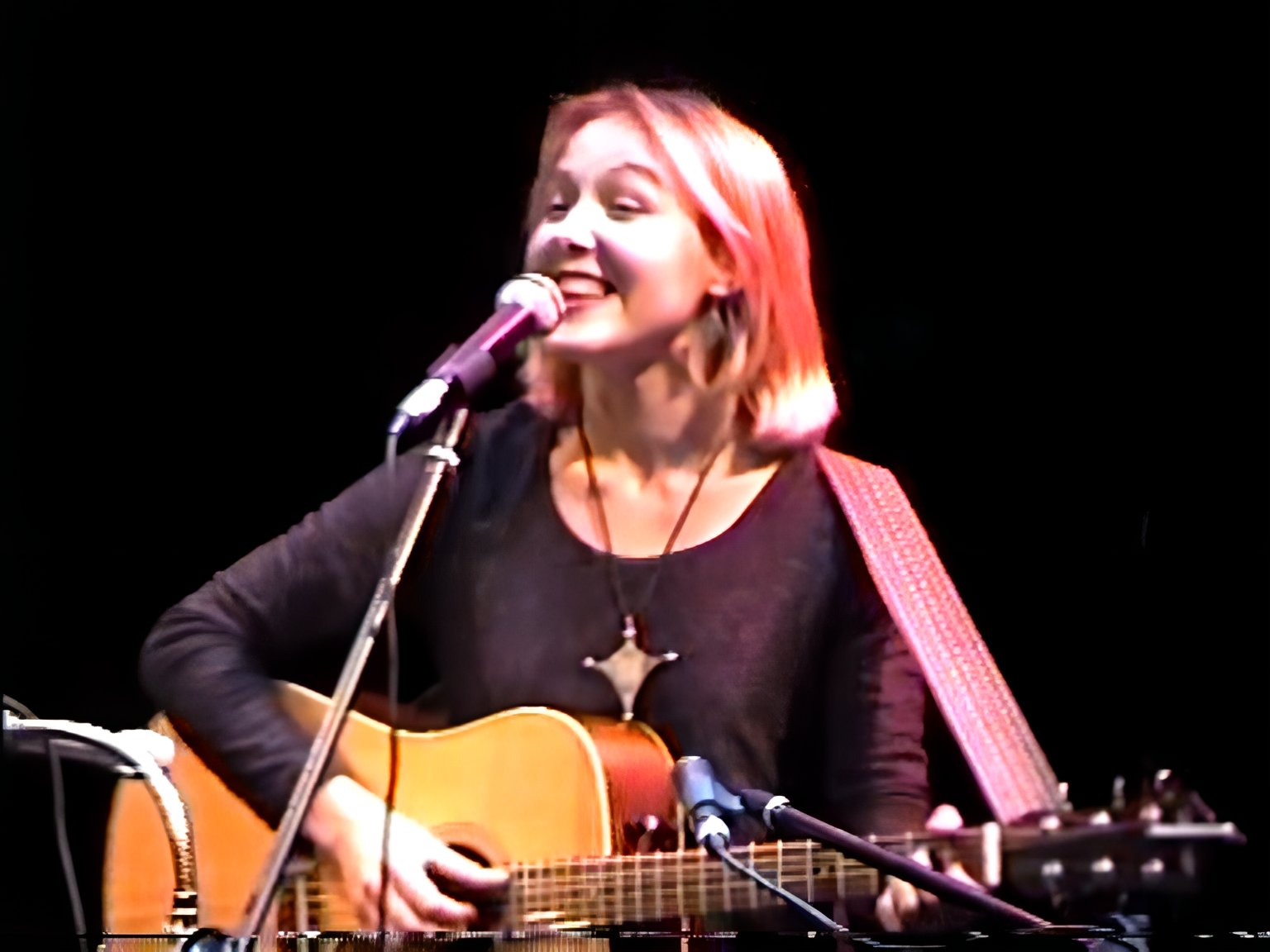
- Kamalova in 1999

Background information
- Born: 8 August 1969; Sarapul, Udmurt ASSR, Russian SFSR, USSR
- Died: 18 September 2024 (aged 55)
- Genres: World; Russian; Tatar
- Occupation: Singer
- Instrument: Vocals
- Years active: 1992–2024
- Label: Unstable Ape
- Formerly of: Children of the Underground
- Website: zulya.com

Zulya Nazipovna Kamalova (Russian: Зуля (Зульфия) Назиповна Камалова; Tatar: Зөлфия Нәҗип кызы Камалова; 8 August 1969 – 18 September 2024) was a Russian-born Australian singer. She resided in Australia though toured Europe frequently.

== Life and career ==
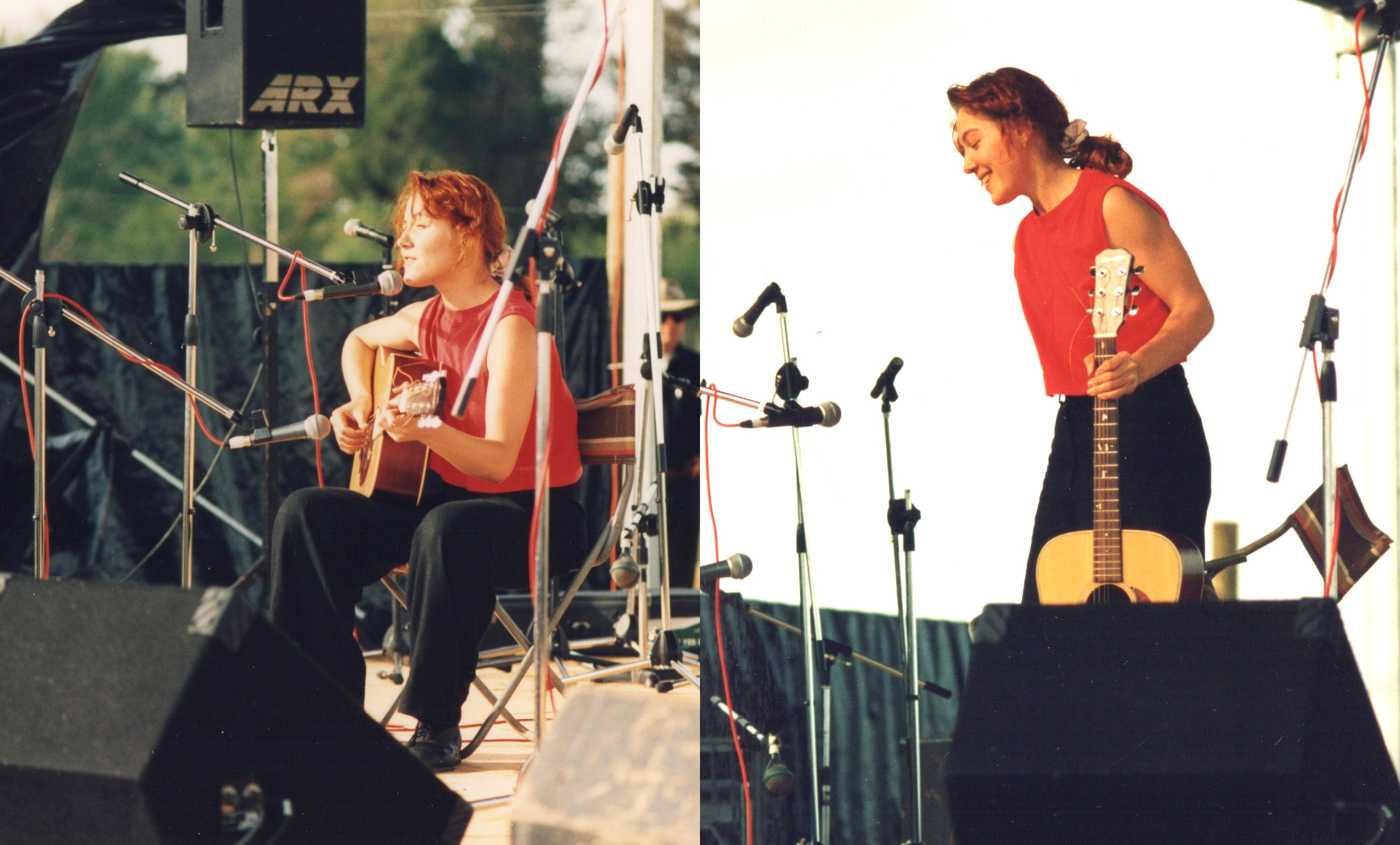
Kamalova on stage at Longford, Tasmania in 1995

Zulfia (Zulya) Kamalova was born in Sarapul but grew up in Tatarstan and began performing and writing music at age of 9. She was of Volga Tatar background. She left home at the age of 17 and eventually moved to the City of Perm to work in a factory and study English and French at the Perm Pedagogical Institute. In 1990, she was selected to travel to California as part of a Perestroika-era whitewater-rafting youth exchange − where she met John Weir, an Australian adventure guide. They married, and moved to Australia in August 1991 (the exact time the USSR dissolved), settling in Hobart, Tasmania. They separated less than 12 months later.

In 1992, Zulya met Martin Tucker, a Hobart musician, who became her collaborator and partner.

While in Hobart, she studied at the Conservatorium, worked as a translator for CCAMLR (Commission for the Conservation of Antarctic Marine Living Resources), and started to play her own music and record albums (limited-run cassettes and a full-length album Journey of Voice) with the support of like-minded people, particularly Martin Tucker.

In 2001 in Hobart, she met her the love of her life, Andrew Tanner, who became her companion, collaborator and father of their daughter Zifa. From 2002–2003, they moved to Moscow, allowing her to explore Russian and Tatar audiences and her connection with her homeland and family.

They subsequently moved to Melbourne, Australia and formed the band The Children of the Underground. In 2004 she signed to Melbourne-based independent record label Unstable Ape Records. Zulya and Andrew settled in Coburg in 2005, where their daughter, Zifa was born in 2006. They remained in Melbourne apart from brief stints in Berlin and Kazan, Tatarstan in 2010 and 2014.

Zulya was a recipient of many awards, including an ARIA Award in 2007 for Best World Music album for her second album with her Melbourne Band, the Children of the Underground, as well as being decorated with a prestigious title of an 'Honored Artist of the Republic of Tatarstan', presented to her in 2012 by Rustam Minnikhanoff, the president of Tatarstan.

During many years of creating and producing music, Zulya's achievements included:

- recording 10 albums,
- writing and performing a one-woman musical play,
- composing an opera with Opera Queensland, and
- other projects which earned her wide audience acclaim in Australia and Europe, particularly in Russia and her homeland Tatarstan.

Zulya earned a Masters of Creative Industries in 2020. In 2022, she took on the role of director of The Boite World Music Cafe.

In February 2024, she was diagnosed with stage four cancer. Kamalova died of cancer on 18 September 2024, at the age of 55 two days before her sister Alfia arrived from Russia to see her.

== Musical style ==
Kamalova was known for her interpretations of Tatar and Russian music, often playing with a backing band Children of the Underground. Instrumentation typically includes accordion, double bass, percussion, guitar, brass and string arrangements and occasionally jaw harp. She often combined Tatar with jazz or other folk music, which was novel for Tatar performers, and, at the same time, made the music easily accessible for international audience.

== Discography ==
=== Albums ===
List of albums
Title	Album details
Journey of Voice	Released: 1997; Label: Unstable Ape Records (UARR 005); Formats: CD
Aloukie	Released: 1999; Label: Formats: CD
Elusive	Released: 2002; Label: Unstable Ape Records (UAR 022); Formats: CD
The Waltz of Emptiness (And Other Songs On Russian Themes) (with The Children of the Underground)	Released: 2005; Label: Unstable Ape Records (UAR 040); Formats: CD
3 Nights (with The Children of the Underground)	Released: 2007; Label: Unstable Ape Records (UAR 056); Formats: CD
Tales of Subliming	Released: 2010; Label: Unstable Ape Records (UAR 064); Formats: CD
Kosmostan	Released: 2014; Label: Yummy Music; Formats: CD
On Love and Science	Released: 2015; Label: Formats: CD
6 Days Loving	Released: 2019; Label: Zulya Music (ZM2019); Formats: CD, digital

== Awards and nominations ==
Kamalova is an Honored Artist of the Republic of Tatarstan.

=== ARIA Music Awards ===
The ARIA Music Awards is an annual awards ceremony that recognises excellence, innovation, and achievement across all genres of Australian music. They commenced in 1987.

Year	Nominee / work	Award	Result	Ref.
2003	Elusive	Best World Music Album	Nominated	
2007	3 Nights	Best World Music Album	Won	

=== Music Victoria Awards ===
The Music Victoria Awards are an annual awards night celebrating Victorian music. They commenced in 2006.

Year	Nominee / work	Award	Result
2013	Zulya and the Children of the Underground	Best Global or Reggae Act	Nominated

== Legacy ==
Music label Yummy Music held a tribute concert in August 2026.
