= Monika Fikerle =

- Genres: Noise rock, indie rock, black metal, hardcore punk
- Member of: Love of Diagrams
- Formerly of: Sea Scouts; Baseball; The Grimm; Jihad Against America; Surgery; 1001101

Monika Fikerle is an Australian musician and multi-instrumentalist, most noted for her "energetic, quirky" drumming style.

== Biography ==
Fikerle began her music career in Hobart in 1994, becoming Sea Scouts' drummer after having taken up the drums 'about a week' earlier. She later played in Surgery and 1001101 before rejoining Sea Scouts in what would become the classic line-up. Fikerle's drumming style during her early years in Hobart featured a lot of tom work, and used cymbals only to accent the end of the bar, creating a thunderous wall of tribal pounding. Fikerle's later work re-introduced more traditional rock kit elements such as snare and cymbals.

Since relocating to Melbourne, Fikerle has continued to work in more than one band concurrently, including her current projects Love of Diagrams and the Misanthropes, and her previous projects Baseball, Jihad Against America, Miniature Submarines, and The Bites. Although Fikerle is best known for her drumming, she has contributed to bands on bass, melodica and piano accordion, and has also featured as a vocalist. Love of Diagrams signed to Matador Records for the release of Mosaic, becoming the first Australian act to appear on the Matador label.

Fikerle has also toured internationally with several of the bands that she has contributed to, including Sea Scouts, Baseball, and Love of Diagrams. The tours have encompassed several locations that are not widely visited by Australian bands, such as Eastern Europe and Taiwan.
