= Jane Badler =

American actress and singer

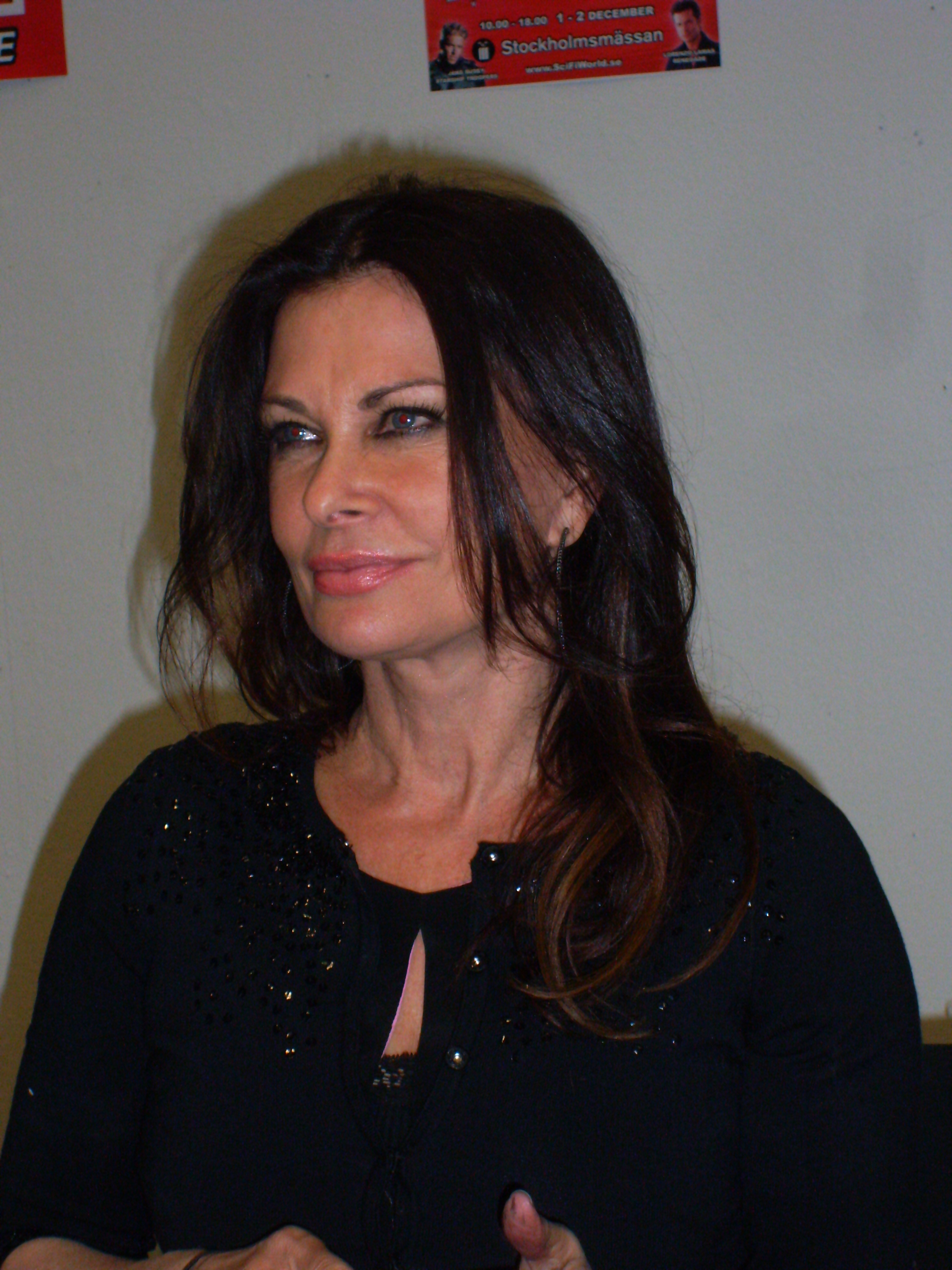
- Badler in 2012
- Born: December 31, 1953 (age 72); Brooklyn, New York City, U.S.
- Education: Northwestern University
- Occupations: Actress, singer
- Years active: 1977–present
- Spouse: Stephen Hains
- Children: 2

Jane Badler (born December 31, 1953) is an American-Australian actress and singer. She is known for her role as Diana, the main antagonist in NBC's science fiction series V between 1983 and 1985. Following her role in the V franchise, she had roles in the primetime soap opera Falcon Crest. In 1988, she was in the revival of Mission: Impossible, which was filmed in Australia; Australia has since been Badler's home. Badler has also become an established nightclub singer in Australia, where she still resides; she has released three albums.

== Early life and education ==
Jane Badler was born in Brooklyn, New York on December 31, 1953. Her family is of Galician Jewish descent. She spent her teen years in Great Neck, New York, and moved to Manchester, New Hampshire, when she was in high school. When Badler was 18, her father and brother were killed in a small plane crash.

Badler won the title Miss New Hampshire and competed at the 1973 Miss America Pageant. Subsequently, she enrolled at Northwestern University in Evanston, Illinois, to study drama. She graduated in 1976, earning a BFA.

== Career ==
=== Film and television career ===
Badler's first television role was Melinda Cramer Janssen on the American daytime soap opera One Life to Live, which she played from 1977 to 1981 and again in 1983. During her run, she also appeared in a 1979 episode of the primetime series Fantasy Island. Badler also starred on the daytime soap opera The Doctors as Natalie Bell from 1981 to 1982.

Badler then won her most prominent role, that of the villainous alien Diana in the NBC sci-fi miniseries V (1983). She reprised the role in the sequel miniseries V: The Final Battle (1984) and again on V: The Series, which ran for one season from 1984 to 1985.

Following V, Badler co-starred with José Ferrer in the made-for-TV supernatural thriller Covenant. The following year she guest-starred as Meredith Braxton throughout the 1986–87 season of the CBS primetime soap opera Falcon Crest. Her other guest appearances during the 1980s included Riptide, Hotel and Murder, She Wrote. In 1987, she played the role of Tania Winthrop in the short-lived action-adventure series The Highwayman. She then traveled to Australia to play agent Shannon Reed in the 1980s revival of Mission: Impossible, joining the series midway through its first season (replacing actress Terry Markwell, and her character of Casey Randall); then stayed with the series for its second season before it was cancelled in early 1990. After the series ended, Badler moved to Australia permanently and married businessman Stephen Hains. They have two sons, Sam and Harry. She later appeared in the role of Mrs Peacock on the Australian game show Cluedo from 1992 to 1993, and had a guest-starring role in Snowy River: The McGregor Saga in 1995.

In March 2010, Badler was cast as the villainous Diana Marshall in the Australian soap opera Neighbours. She had a four-month guest contract with the show.

A remake of V premiered in late 2009, and although this version did not include the character of Diana, the series' executive producer, Scott Peters, suggested that Badler and other stars from the original version may be offered guest roles as new characters. In August 2010, it was announced that Badler would be joining the series as a new character named Diana, the benevolent mother of the Visitors' evil leader Anna (Morena Baccarin). Badler appeared in nine of the second season's ten episodes, commencing in January 2011. In the second-season finale, her character was killed by Anna, and ABC decided to not renew the series for a third season.

In November 2020, Badler played Lauren Balmer in the horror film Surrogate. The film was released internationally in September 2022.

=== Music and theatre career ===
Already an able singer when she competed in the Miss New Hampshire and Miss America Pageants, Badler forged a career in cabaret and on the stage in the 2005 Magnormos production of archy & mehitabel, based on Don Marquis's books of poetry. She also appeared in Sextet, Big Hair in America, and with acclaimed Australian director Robert Chuter (who also directed two of her cabaret shows in 2000) she appeared in The Singing Forest, The Great Gatsby and her one-woman show Shakin' the Blues Away in which she also sang. Other productions in which she appeared for Magnormos included a concert of the musical Rebecca and OzMade Musicals.

Badler released her debut album (backed by the Melbourne-based band Sir) on June 1, 2008. Titled The Devil Has My Double, it is an autobiographical album which has been described as "a compulsive mix of fame, sex and solitude, set to a sweeping soundtrack of cold soul and passionate synthetics". As part of promotion for the album, she gave an extensive interview about her work to the Boxcutters podcast.

Badler released her second album, Tears Again, in 2011. She then teamed up with Australian musicians Matt Doll and Byron St John to co-write her third album, Opus, which was released in September 2014.

Badler was featured in the music video for Australian synthwave band September 87’s 2023 single Room Service. She played the lover of Mark Seymour’s character Zamboy.

== Personal life ==
In 1990, Badler married Australian businessman Stephen Hains, son of David Hains. The couple met while she was filming Mission: Impossible in Australia. Badler remained in Australia and the couple reside in Melbourne. They have two children.

On January 7, 2020, Badler announced that her 27-year-old son, actor Harry Hains, died of a fentanyl overdose following a battle with "mental illness, chronic sleeping disorders, and addiction".

== Filmography ==
Year	Title	Role	Notes
1977–1981, 1983	One Life to Live	Melinda Cramer	Unknown episodes
1979	Fantasy Island	Kim	Episode: "The Victim/The Mermaid"
1981–1982	The Doctors	Natalie Bell Dancy	Unknown episodes
1981	Terror Among Us	Pam	TV movie
1983	The First Time	Karen Watson	
1983	V	Diana	Main cast, miniseries
1983	Mr. Smith	Uncredited	Episode: "Mr. Smith Plays Cyrano"
1984	V The Final Battle	Diana	Main cast, miniseries
1984	Brothers	Phyllis	Episode: "Mindless Passion"
1984–1985	V: The Series	Diana	Main cast
1985	Covenant	Dana Noble	TV movie
1985	Hotel	Angie Archer	Episode: "Celebrations"
1986	Blacke's Magic	Elisa Leigh	Episode: "Ten Tons of Trouble"
1986	Riptide	Janet Ingram	Episode: "Smiles We Left Behind"
1986	Penalty Phase	Katie Pinter	TV movie
1986–1987	Falcon Crest	Meredith Braxton	Recurring role (season 6)
1987	Jake and the Fatman	Shelly	Episode: "Happy Days Are Here Again"
1987–1988	The Highwayman	Tania Winthrop	Recurring role
1988	Murder, She Wrote	Carolyn Hazlitt	Episode: "Curse of the Daanau"
1989	Easy Kill	Jade Anderson	
1989	Fine Gold	Julia	
1989	Autumn Rain	Lucia	
1989–1990	Mission: Impossible	Shannon Reed	Main cast
1990	Black Snow	Shelby Collins	
1992	Cluedo	Mrs. Elizabeth Peacock	Main cast, whodunit game show
1992	What's Cooking	Guest	TV Series, 1 episode
1992	Embassy	Jacqueline Kowalski	Episode: "Nice Guys Finish Last"
1994	Sky Trackers	Coral Lee Pierce	Episode: "Star Time"
1995	Under the Gun	Sandy Torrence	
1995	The Man from Snowy River	Yvonne Waugh	2 episodes
1997	Flipper		Episode: "Help Me, Rhonda"
1999	Crash Zone	Elanor Renfrey	Episode: "No News Is Good News"
2001	Like Mother Like Son	Mrs. Fox	TV movie
2002	Sir Arthur Conan Doyle's The Lost World	Dame Alice Kyteler	Episode: "A Witch's Calling"
2002	Blue Heelers	Kath Shepherd	Episode: "Sins of the Father"
2010	Neighbours	Diana Marshall	Recurring role
2010	Needle	Professor Banyon	
2011	V	Diana	Recurring role (season 2)
2011	Offspring	Wendy	3 episodes
2013	Birthday Cake	Herself	
2013	Bitch, Popcorn & Blood	La Femme Fatale	
2014	Good Samaritan	Businesswoman	
2015	Girl Gets Girl	Kirsten	
2016	Virtual Revolution	Dina	
2018	A Beautiful Request	Wendy	
2022	Surrogate	Lauren Balmer	
2022	Smiling Friends	Herself - host	Episode: "Mr. Frog"
2023	Today Extra	Guest - Herself	TV series, 1 episode
2023	Studio 10	Guest - Herself	TV series, 1 episode
2023	Trim Season	Mona	Feature film, Australia/US
2023	September 87 - Room Service	Zamboy’s lover	Featured in music video
2024	Ricky Stanicky	Miriam Summerhayes	

== Discography ==
=== Studio albums ===
Title	Details
The Devil Has My Double	Release date: June 17, 2008; Label: Unstable Ape Records; Formats: CD, download
Tears Again	Release date: March 11, 2011; Label: Inertia Records; Formats: CD, download
Opus	Release date: September 15, 2014; Label: MeJane Music; Formats: CD, download

=== Singles ===
Title	Details
"Four Corners to My Bed"	Released: 2011; Formats: CD, download
"Men Who Lie"	Released: 2011; Formats: CD, download; Music video: Directed by 'Mal Voyageur'
"Snow Carnival Queen"	Released: 2011; Formats: CD, download; Music video: Animated and produced by 1house Management
"I Want a Lot of Boys to Cry at My Funeral"	Released: 2011; Formats: CD, download; Music video: Grey Aviary Media
