= Empress Hotel, Fitzroy North =

Empress Hotel
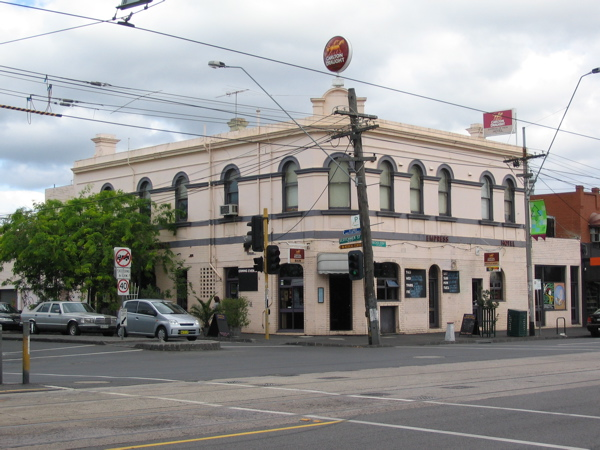
- Interactive map of the Empress Hotel area

General information
- Location: 714 Nicholson Street, Fitzroy North, Victoria
- Coordinates: 37°46′58″S 144°58′40″E
- Opened: 1873

The Empress Hotel(formerly the Empress of India Hotel) is a pub located at 714 Nicholson Street, in the inner Melbourne suburb of Fitzroy North. The Empress Hotel closed in December 2013, and reopened in its current form in early 2015.

== History ==
The pub was opened in 1873 by John Bourke, and named in honour of Queen Victoria, who had been proclaimed the Empress of India on 1 January 1877. Until the late 20th century, it was frequented by employees of the nearby North Fitzroy tram depot.

In the late 1980s, it became a live music venue, and played a part in the Melbourne indie rock scene through the 90s and 2000s. In its last decade as a music venue, hotel management had to deal with noise complaints from residents who had moved nearby without realising it was a music venue. In February 2015 the venue reopened with a traditional bar, a dining area and an open air beer garden.

== See also ==
- List of public houses in Australia
