= Twelve Hundred Times =

Studio album by Laura
- Released: October 14, 2011
- Genres: Post-Rock, Experimental Rock
- Length: 44:10

Laura chronology
Live Album - (re)capitulate (2007)	Twelve Hundred Times (2011)

Twelve Hundred Times is Laura’s 3rd studio album.

== Track listing ==
1. “Visitor” — 07:10
2. “This Grey Earth” — 05:06
3. “Gravity Hill” — 02:18
4. “Mark the Day” — 06:07
5. “Glint” — 02:44
6. “x1200” — 00:50
7. “Stone Seed” — 04:32
8. “Fugue State” — 02:28
9. “The Slow” — 05:50
10. “Safe Confinement” — 01:00
11. “New Safe Confinement” — 05:55
