= Sea Scouts (band) =

Australian band

- Origin: Tasmania, Australia
- Genres: Noise rock
- Years active: 1994–2000
- Labels: Chapter Music; Unstable Ape Records; Zum
- Past members: See members list

Sea Scouts were a noise rock band, based in Hobart, Tasmania.

== Biography ==
=== First incarnation ===
Following the split of his former band Mouth in 1994, Tasmanian musician Tim Evans began jamming with U.F.O. (Unlimited Friendly Objective) frontman Zach von Bamburger. Fusing the elements of thick, rough analogue guitar noise and hidden melodies, also aided by a drum machine, the duo recorded the $100,000 Dollar Mamal (sic) EP. Vocal and instrumental duties were shared by the duo on the polycarbonate-only pressing, as they were in live shows. Live shows were often chaotic affairs marked by loud feedback, repetitive rhythms and heavily distorted bass riffs.

Shortly after the release of the EP, Monika Fikerle became the band's drummer. Idiosyncratic, but contumelious with the band's minimal yet full sound, Fikerle played her kit with a complete absence of snare drum. Following a short tour of the mainland, Fikerle left the band and the band folded six months later.

=== Second incarnation ===
A year after parting company with von Bamburger, Evans restarted the band with bassist Alex Pope, reinterpreting old and composing new material with a drum machine. After several months of gigging, ex-U.F.O bassist Andy Hazel joined on drums, introducing snare and hi-hat to the previously more stripped-back sound. Later in 1996, Sara May Libero replaced Hazel on drums, continuing the band's use of (Moe Tucker style) stand-up drummers. This lineup recorded the band's first full-length album, Pattern Recognition, on four-track cassette recorder and released via Chapter Music in 1997, on vinyl only.

In 1997, the band toured Melbourne and Sydney, supporting Pavement and, in 1998, Archers of Loaf before Libero was replaced by Fikerle, who re-joined the group to jam a newer set of songs.

Later that year the band recorded their second album, Beacon of Hope, released on the Unstable Ape label In the same sessions, the band re-recorded an intentionally cleaner, "less scabby" version of the Pattern Recognition album for CD release.

In 1999 a re-recording of two songs from the band's first incarnation were recorded, and the Word as a Weapon"/"Destroy Your Local McDonalds 7" was released on the Californian label Zum. Further recordings were also made of a combination of old and new songs, which to this date have never been released.

=== Touring and breakup ===
In 1999 Sea Scouts embarked on a tour of North America and Europe, joining Ninetynine for shows in Eastern Europe.

Returning home later in 1999, it was decided that the band would play its final shows in Hobart, before a "grand-final" show at Melbourne's Corner Hotel on 18 February 2000.

=== Legacy ===
- Evans, who made a number of cameos with Ninetynine, recorded with that band whilst on the 1999 tour. Shortly after Sea Scouts disbanded, he formed Bird Blobs in Melbourne. The Bird Blobs were active between 1999 and 2005, releasing an EP and two albums on Unstable Ape Records. After the Bird Blobs disbanded, Evans moved to New York City where he formed the bands Degreaser and Bogan Dust. Upon returning to Australia he formed Coconuts and filled in on vocals for Venom P. Stinger for a time. In 2016 he released the album Wretched Wings under his own name on the New York label Ever/Never.
- Zach von Bamburger founded Mongoose, Monster Monster Monster and Ditchboss, and now plays in Go Genre Everything.
- Monika Fikerle now plays drums with Love of Diagrams and bass with Baseball, both bands being based in Melbourne.
- Alex Pope plays in Hobart black metal band Ruins.
- In 2021, Evans and Fikerle reunited in the band The Misanthropes.

== Members ==
- Tim Evans – vocals, guitar (1994–2000)
- Alex Pope – bass, vocals (1996–2000)
- Monika Fikerle — drums (1995, 1997–2000)
- Sara May Libero – drums (1996–97)
- Andy Hazel - drums (1996)
- Zach Von Bamburger – vocals, bass (1994–96)

== Discography ==
=== Albums ===
- Pattern Recognition – Chapter Music (CH15) (1 August 1997)
- Beacon of Hope – Unstable Ape (PATSY003) (December 1998)

=== EPs ===
- $100,000 Dollar Mamal – Independent (1996)

=== Singles ===
- "Word as a Weapon" – Zum (ZUM005) (20 August 1999)
