= Jules Sheldon =

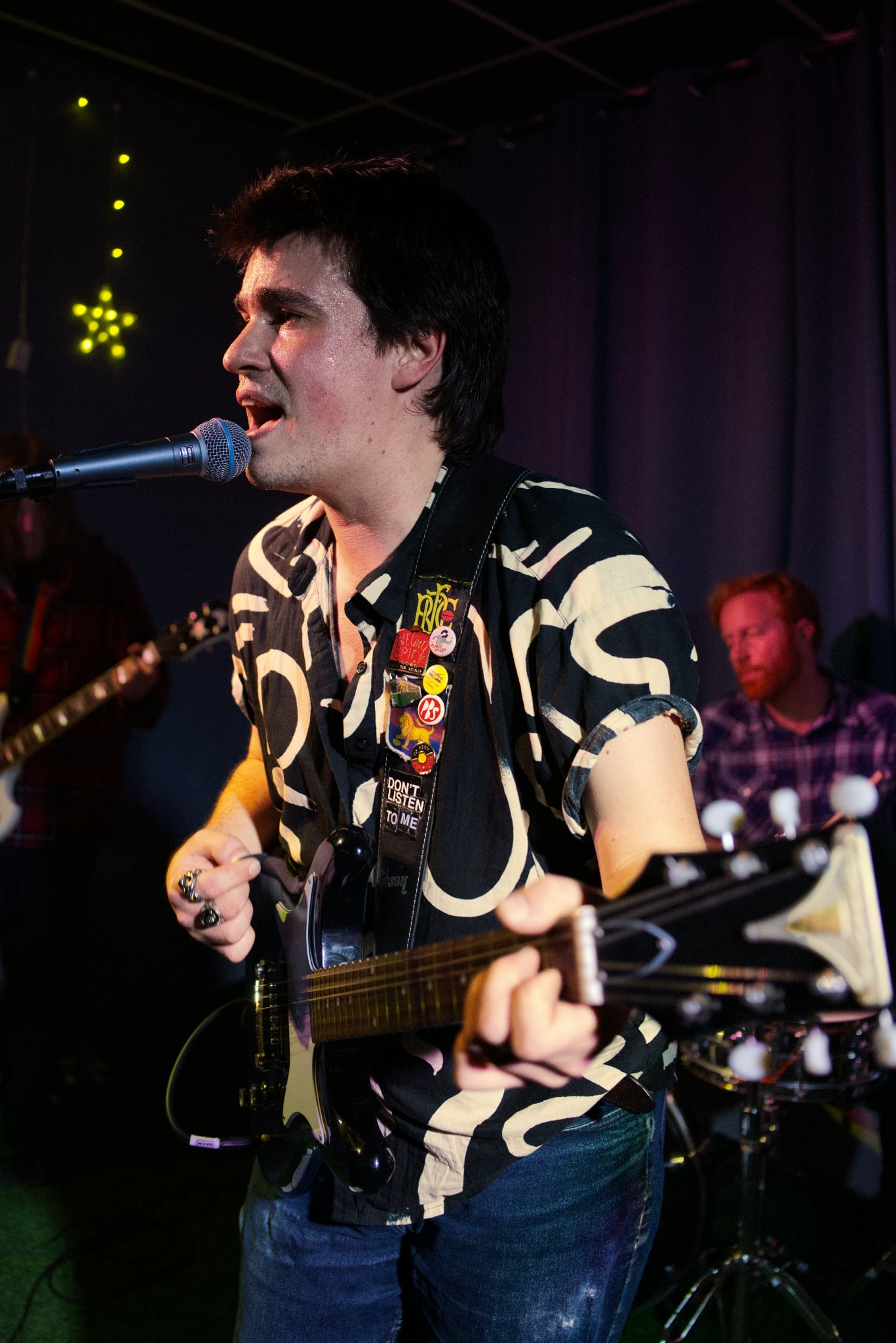

Background information
- Born: Julian Jabez Odell Sheldon; 25 October 1992 (age 34); Melbourne, Victoria
- Genre: alt-country
- Instruments: guitar, banjo, bass guitar
- Years active: 2009-present
- Label: Miller St.
- Website: https://julessheldonmusic.bandcamp.com/

Julian "Jules" Sheldon (born 1992) is an Australian alt-country musician and songwriter.

== Biography ==
Born and raised in Melbourne's northern suburb of Preston, Jules Sheldon began writing music and playing shows in his teens.

Speaking of his start in music, Sheldon said to Australian Musician in 2025: "My parents played their record collections to me from a very young age, and my household shuffled to the songs of Bowie, The Velvet Underground, and Patti Smith. I started writing in high school at age 14 as a coping mechanism and catharsis, due to being heavily bullied, queer, and neurodivergent. I only survived due to throwing myself into my music, and I am eternally grateful it came along".

Sheldon became a regular at Pure Pop Records in St Kilda due to its unique liquor license allowing him to attend shows underage. It was at Pure Pop he met Spencer P. Jones & Brian Henry Hooper of the Beasts Of Bourbon who saw promise in the young folk pop songwriter. Jones would go onto produce Sheldon’s self-titled debut album released in 2010, which also featured Hooper on bass.

Sheldon would follow this up in 2015 with his second album Football, Trams, Parties, & Other Extended Highlights. Produced by ex-Sleater Kinney drummer Laura Macfarlane, it was a stripped back slacker folk affair, only featuring Sheldon on electric guitar and bassist Gemma Helms. Sheldon and Helms would go onto tour internationally in support of the album, before returning to Australia in late 2015.

Sheldon's third album Bloodshed & Serenity was released in 2017. Recorded by Ed Lloyd (synths/drum machines) and once again featuring Gemma Helms (bass), it would be the first album where Sheldon played all the lead guitar work himself and strongly differed from his previous work by incorporating a post-punk influence.

Sheldon was deeply affected by the deaths of Jones and Hooper in 2018, and did not release a new album until 2025's Electric Transport. Electric Transport notably introduced backing band The Boundary Riders, consisting of Joseph Foley on bass and lap steel, and James Turner on drums. An alt-country affair, with punk and jangle-pop influences, Electric Transport would discuss the loss of Sheldon's mentors on the song "The Uncles". In a 2025 interview with Tempo music blog, Sheldon would say of the song: “Immortalising them in a song just seemed like the right thing to do. If someone listens to that song and then delves into their back catalogues, then I truly feel like I have helped keep their memories alive.”

Electric Transport was described by publication The Partae as “a heartfelt return to form”, and received praise from Rhythms Magazine and Americana UK. It gained airplay on community radio stations around Australia.

== Discography ==
=== Albums ===
- Jules Sheldon (2010)
- Football, Trams, Parties, & Other Extended Highlights (2015)
- Bloodshed & Serenity (2017)
- Electric Transport (2025)
