= 3 Nights (album) =

Studio album by Zulya and the Children of the Underground
- Released: 2007
- Studio: Woodstock Studios
- Label: Unstable Ape Records
- Producer: Andrew Tanner, Zulya Kamalova

Zulya and the Children of the Underground chronology
The Waltz of Emptiness (And Other Songs On Russian Themes) (2005)	3 Nights (2007)	Tales of Subliming (2010)

3 Nights is a studio album by Australian world music group, Zulya and the Children of the Underground. The album was released in 2007.

At the ARIA Music Awards of 2007, the album won the ARIA Award for Best World Music Album.

== Track listing ==
1. "How Lovers Fail And Fall (All Bad)" - 4:45
2. "The Wolf And The Moon / Büre Häm Ay" - 4:28
3. "Children's Bird Song / Детская Песня О Птице" - 4:09
4. "White Wind Tango / Танго Белого Ветра" - 4:19
5. "Nevalyashka" - 0:25
6. "The Night Is Dark / Ночь Темна" - 4:40
7. "Love Hunter" - 4:44
8. "We Twelve Girls / Bez Unike Qız Idek" - 1:53
9. "Hear How She Grows / Слышишь Как Растет" - 4:45
10. "Forgotten Song" - 2:21
11. "Princess / Принцесса" - 4:40
12. "Clocks / Часы" - 4:13
13. "Red Flower / Alım Cäl Tügel Siña" - 2:58
14. "The Night Is Long / Tön Ozın" - 4:24
