= Laura (band) =

Australian post-rock band

- Origin: Melbourne, Victoria, Australia
- Genres: Post-rock, shoegaze, alternative rock
- Years active: 2001–present
- Label: Alone Again Records and Grey Earth Music
- Members: Nathan Biggin; Andrew Chalmers; Carolyn Gannell; Andrew Yardley; Ben Yardley
- Past members: David Gagliardi; Jason Roche; Scot Shaw; Joseph Wilkinson

Laura are an Australian post-rock band from Melbourne.

== History ==
Laura formed in 2001 and released their debut EP - Photographs... in 2002. Although it received positive reviews on the whole, it failed to gain the band a significant following. However, with their follow up album Mapping Your Dreams (produced by noted Japanese engineer Naomune Anzai) in 2004, they became world-renowned for their loud live shows and post-rock sound.

The album garnered high-rotation airplay and promotional support from independent radio stations FBi Radio and 2ser in Sydney as well as 3RRR and 3PBS in Melbourne. It was critically successful notably in the naming of self-released single We Should Keep This Secret (from their Mapping Your Dreams album) as Beat Magazine's single of the week in 4 September, and later becoming the magazine's single of that year.

Radio Swan Is Down, their second album, was released in 2006, and was supported by a national tour.

In February 2007, Laura supported American band Isis on their tour of Australia. (re)capitulate, released in October 2007, is a live recording that was recorded at the HiFi Bar in Melbourne during this tour. The live version of 'Radio Swan Is Down part 1' was voted Beat Single of the week as well as receiving much critical acclaim for its intensity and power.

Their second EP Yes Maybe No, released in 2008 on US label Elevation Recordings, was limited to 2000 copies.

Having released a Japanese edition of Radio Swan is Down the previous year, Laura toured Japan in 2008 to promote the album, playing shows in Tokyo, Osaka and Hiroshima. In 2009, they supported Swedish band Cult of Luna and Japanese band Mono on their tours of Australia.

In 2011, Laura released their third album, Twelve Hundred Times. The album featured the singles Mark the Day, which was named by both Beat and Inpress magazines as Single of the Week, This Grey Earth and The Slow. Recorded over multiple sessions, the project saw the departure of Gaglardi from the band, with drums on the final sessions played by Sean Albers.

In 2018, Andrew Yardley, Ben Yardley and Carolyn Gannell starting writing and recording some new material for their side project, Sens Dep (Sensory Deprivation). Their album Lush Desolation was released on 30 November 2020.

Having spent several years writing and recording for a new Laura project, the band are currently sharing updates from rehearsals and studio sessions on their social media channels. A new Laura album is set to be released in 2027.

== Members ==
- Nathan Biggin (piano, synthesizers, guitars)
- Andrew Chalmers (guitars, vocals)
- Carolyn Gannell (cello)
- Andrew Yardley (bass guitars)
- Ben Yardley (guitars)

== Discography ==
=== Singles ===
- We Should Keep This Secret (2004)
- I Hope (2006)
- Radio Swan Is Down part 1 - Live (2007)
- Mark the Day (2010)
- This Grey Earth (2011)
- The Slow (2012)

=== EPs ===
- Photographs... (2002)
- Yes Maybe No (2008)

=== Albums ===
- Mapping Your Dreams (2005)
- Radio Swan Is Down (2006)
- Live Album - (re)capitulate (2007)
- Twelve Hundred Times (2011)
