= Commons Social Change Library =

Online education library

The Commons Social Change Library is an online education library that offers more than 1500 resources about activism, campaigning and organising. The library is based in Australia. The founder and director of the library is Holly Hammond, an activist educator. The aim of the library is to make the work of social change and social movements more effective and efficient. It supports activists with training and resource development, through what Hammond describes as "gathering, curating, and distributing collective wisdom for social change". The library contains collections from Australia and around the world such as the Australian Conservation Foundation, Australian Progress, Leading Change Network, Tectonica, Waging Nonviolence, Mobilisation Lab, Workers Rights Hub and Social Change Lab.

Since 2023 the library has produced an annual series of podcasts entitled Commons Conversations in which campaigners share their experiences and insights into activism, learning in movements, and radical history. The library also produces a monthly selection of protests, strikes and significant dates concerning social change in Australian history as an audio segment for Community Radio 3CR and other radio stations. First aired on Community Radio 3CR, guests have included novelist and ACT-UP historian Sarah Schulman, co-founder of Women's Environmental Leadership Australia Judy Lambert, activist and researcher Laurence Cox, Australian Youth Climate Coalition Climate & Racial Justice Director Mille Telford, poet Laniyuk, and disability campaigners El Gibbs and Elly Desmarchelier.

It has resources on different topics such as on arts and creativity campaign strategy, community organising, digital campaigning, communications and media, working effectively in groups, fundraising, diversity and inclusion, activist history and well-being. Resource formats include articles, book reviews, case studies, Easy Read guides, manuals, podcasts, guides, reports, videos and webinars. The library does not charge a fee for access to its resources.

The library works on projects with organisations in Australia and around the world.

It is a registered charity and has tax Deductible Gift Recipient (DGR) status.
