= Iain McIntyre =

Australian activist, musician and writer

Iain McIntyre is an Australian writer, musician and community radio broadcaster, currently based in Melbourne. From the 1980s onwards he has published books and zines, including the How to Make Trouble and Influence People series.

== 1980s ==
In the late 1980s he became involved in environmental and left activism in Perth, Western Australia where he also co-edited his first publication Freakzine and presented a number of music shows for 6UVS/RTRfm.

== 1990s ==
In 1992 McIntyre moved to Melbourne, Victoria where he continued his involvement in forest defence, squatting and other campaigns and also began co-editing the Melbourne-based fanzine Woozy with Laura MacFarlane. Woozy ran for the best part of a decade and brought DIY currents around music, politics and comics together in one publication. 22 issues, involving over 100 contributors, were produced and more than 20 benefits and launches held.

During the 1990s McIntyre began contributing to, and later co-hosted, Community Radio 3CR's 'Squatters and Unwaged Workers Airwaves' (SUWA) show. He finished his involvement with the program in the late 2000s, but has continued to produce music and history series for the station since. He co-produces a monthly podcast entitled Tiny Sparks and Turning Points, which presents a selection of protests, strikes and significant dates concerning social change in Australian history.

In 1996 the first volume of McIntyre's How to Make Trouble and Influence People series, which documented Australian pranks, hoaxes and political mischief making, was published under the pseudonym of the Question Mark Collective. Two sequels followed, How To Stop Whining and Start Living in 1999, and Revenge of the Troublemaker in 2003. In 2009, Breakdown Press collected all three of the How To Make Trouble And Influence People books into a single volume featuring additional material and interviews with activists and pranksters including John Safran, Uncle Kevin Buzzacott, The Chaser team, Pauline Pantsdown and The Sisters of Perpetual Indulgence. In 2013 PM Press published a new edition of the book.

McIntyre played bass, guitar and sang in a number of bands in Perth, Melbourne and London during the 1990s including The Stoned Posers, the Sea Haggs, Felafel, the Dennis Lillees, The Barnacle Sisters, and the Authentics. In 1996 he toured Europe as a member of Dragster and ninetynine, later forming the first line up of Kokoshkar in London, a band which continued on in Australia until 1999. In 1999 McIntyre rejoined ninetynine and has played on all their subsequent recordings and at the majority of their Australian shows, but did not join them on their European and US tours.

== 2000s ==
During the 2000s, McIntyre played bass and shouted in garage band Thee Stag Knights as well as with The Hatchetmen/The Hatchets. 2007 saw him release the A Warning CD/DVD, a "lost 1970s dystopian film" constructed from various period documentaries. A Warning featured a soundtrack primarily performed on vintage analogue synthesizers and included vocals and additional instrumentation from Kirsty Stegwazi, Van Walker, Cat Hope and members of Sir, Scarecrow Tiggy, Tarantula and other Melbourne acts. The same year saw him tour Europe with Naomi Evans as part of anarcho-casio pop duo the Kleber Claux Memorial Singers.

During the 2000s, McIntyre ran Homebrew Press, which self-published a selection of his books and pamphlets. These included Disturbing the Peace, a collection of pieces on Australian radical history, Always Look on the Bright Side of Life: The AIDEX '91 Story, an oral history of the 1991 Canberra anti-arms protest, and Lock Out The Landlords: Anti-Eviction Resistance, 1929–36. In 2010 he hosted a history walk based partially based on the Lock Out The Landlords pamphlet around the inner-Melbourne suburb of Brunswick, which was also podcast as part of the People's Tour series.

In 2004 3CR published Wild About You: Tales from the Australian Rock Underground, 1963–68, a book which McIntyre co-wrote with Ian Marks. A tribute CD featuring Melbourne acts covering the mid-sixties bands chronicled in the book was recorded at 3CR, and a significantly expanded version of the book, also featuring New Zealand garage and R&B bands, was published by Verse Chorus Press in 2010. In 2006 Wakefield Press published a collection McIntyre edited entitled Tomorrow Is Today: Australia in the Psychedelic Era, 1966–70. A subsequent tribute CD, once more recorded at 3CR, was released and a festival held in the same year.

In 2005 Iain produced the Australian Troublemakers' Calendar, which included a radical Australian date for each day of the year, as a benefit for the SUWA show. The following year 3CR financed a higher-end version and a collective was formed to produce and nationally distribute the Seeds of Dissent Calendar, which came out until 2009.

2008 saw the release of an oral history, Always Look on the Bright Side of Life: The AIDEX ’91 Story, which covered Australian protests in 1989, 1991, and 2008 against weapons fairs.

== 2010s ==
During the 2010s McIntyre co-curated the Australian Museum of Squatting on-line archive which collects together radical photos, articles, stories and ephemera related to squatting movements. 2012 saw Ledatape publish McIntyre's Sticking It to the Man: Pop, Protest and Black Fiction of the Counterculture, a collection of book jackets and reviews of novels published between 1964 and 1975. In the same year McIntyre helped compile the Down Under Nuggets: Original Australian Artyfacts 1965-1967 CD compilation with David Laing and Ian Marks.

2011 also saw McIntyre complete a Masters thesis on the topic of Australian peace, environmental and social movements’ involvement in the AIDEX anti-arms fair blockades of 1989 and 1991.

Expanding on his 2012 Leda Tape collection, in 2017 McIntyre co-edited the first of three books with Andrew Nette about post-war pulp and paperback fiction, Girl Gangs, Biker Boys, and Real Cool Cats: Pulp Fiction and Youth Culture, 1950 to 1980, published by PM Press. 2019 saw the release of the second book in the series, Sticking It to the Man: Revolution and Counterculture in Pulp and Popular Fiction, 1950 to 1980.

In 2018 PM Press published an anthology of American hobo literature and songs from 1879 to 1941, entitled On the Fly! which McIntyre had collected and edited. In the same year he completed his PhD about the history and practice of environmental blockading in Australia, Canada and the United States, for which he received the University of Melbourne’s Denis Wettenhall prize for best thesis on an aspect of Australian history. An adaption of the thesis was subsequently published by Routledge in 2021 as Environmental Blockades: Obstructive Direct Action and the History of the Environmental Movement.

McIntyre has worked with the online Commons Social Change Library since 2019, regularly contributing resources, case studies, interviews, and chronologies on topics such as school strikes, environmental blockades, creative activism, and other aspects of current and past social and labour movement practice. He has also been involved in researching, narrating and producing history walks, such as one covering unemployed activism in Brunswick during the Great Depression, and a project funded by Melbourne’s Darebin council to document music venues in the area from the 1950s to the present.

== 2020s ==
In 2021 McIntyre and Nette's third book covering fiction, Dangerous Visions and New Worlds: Radical Science Fiction, 1950 to 1985, was released, subsequently winning the 2022 Aurealis Conveners' Award For Excellence and the 2022 Locus Magazine Award for Non-Fiction. It was also nominated for the Hugo Best Related Work Award and the British Fantasy Best Non-Fiction Award. In February 2022 a symposium about the book, radical politics and sci-fi was held by the City Lights Foundation featuring panelists including Marge Piercy, Samuel Delany, Michael Moorcock, adrienne maree brown, Terry Bisson, Annalee Newitz, Alexis Pauline Gumbs, Vandana Singh, and Cory Doctorow.

McIntyre co-edited Knocking The Top Off: A People's History of Alcohol in Australia in 2023. Along with chapters by himself and co-editor Alex Ettling, the anthology included work by a number of Australian social and labour historians including Diane Kirkby, Jeff Sparrow, Tanja Luckins, Wendy Bacon, David Nichols, Maggie Brady and Graeme Willett.

In 2023 McIntyre also co-edited a collection of cartoons originally produced for Industrial Workers of the World (IWW) newspapers by Ernest Riebe in the 1910s and 1920s, Mr Block: The Subversive Comics and Writings of Ernest Riebe. Two years later he co-edited The Popular Wobbly: Selected Writings of T-Bone Slim, which included prose, commentary and poetry from another key contributor to IWW publications from the 1920s to 1940s, Matti Valentin Huhta, aka T-Bone Slim.
