= Unstable Ape Records =

Unstable Ape Records was an Australian independent record label. Founded in Tasmania, it functioned out of Melbourne between 2001 and 2013. Unstable Ape's focus tended primarily towards indie rock and roll, but also expanded its interest to contemporary folk (Laura Jean, Marissa Nadler), jazz (Christopher Hale Ensemble) and world music (Zulya). In the early 2000s, the label became a home to many Melbourne indie rock bands. Albums are now all out of print although some are available to stream. The label ceased trading in early 2013, its last release being Tales of Subliming by Zulya and the Children of the Underground.

== Artists on Unstable Ape Records ==
- At Sea
- Andrew McCubbin
- Jane Badler
- Bird Blobs
- Christopher Hale Ensemble
- Die! Die! Die!
- Jessica Says
- Laura Jean
- Love of Diagrams
- Marissa Nadler
- The Night Terrors
- Ninetynine
- No Through Road
- Ricaine
- Sandro
- Sea Scouts
- Sir
- SNAP! CRAKK!
- VulgarGrad
- Zulya Kamalova

== See also ==
- List of record labels
- Australian indie rock
