= Call the Doctor =

Studio album by Sleater-Kinney
- Released: March 25, 1996
- Recorded: September 1995
- Genre: Punk rock
- Length: 30:04
- Label: Chainsaw
- Producer: John Goodmanson; Sleater-Kinney

Sleater-Kinney chronology
Sleater-Kinney (1995)	Call the Doctor (1996)	Dig Me Out (1997)

Call the Doctor is the second studio album by the American rock band Sleater-Kinney. It was released on March 25, 1996, by Chainsaw Records to critical acclaim.

== Recording and release ==
Call the Doctor was written in three weeks and recorded in four days. According to singer and guitarist Corin Tucker, the writing was inspired by a "crap" job she had and how people are "consumerized and commodified" by society. The album features no bass player. As Tucker explained, "We started writing songs with two guitars, and we liked the way it sounded. It gives us a lot of freedom to write these lines that go back and forth." The album is occasionally considered to be Sleater-Kinney's first proper album because Tucker and co-vocalist and guitarist Carrie Brownstein had left their previous bands, Heavens to Betsy and Excuse 17, at the time of its recording.

Call the Doctor was produced by John Goodmanson and released on March 25, 1996, by the queercore independent record label Chainsaw Records, which also released the band's previous album, Sleater-Kinney. Drummer Laura MacFarlane, who was based in Australia, had to leave the band shortly after the album's release when her visa ran out. As a result, the band asked Toni Gogin of CeBe Barnes to fill in on the drums while touring the album. As of March 1997, the album has sold 6,000 copies. As of February 2015, Call the Doctor has sold 60,000 copies in the U.S. according to Nielsen SoundScan.

== Critical reception ==
Professional ratings
Review scores
Source	Rating
AllMusic	4.5/5 stars
Christgau's Consumer Guide	A
Encyclopedia of Popular Music	3/5 stars
MusicHound Rock	4.5/5
The Philadelphia Inquirer	4/4 stars
Pitchfork	8.6/10
Rolling Stone	4/5 stars
The Rolling Stone Album Guide	5/5 stars
Select	3/5
Spin	8/10

Call the Doctor received acclaim from music journalists. Charles Taylor of The Boston Phoenix compared the album favorably to Heavens to Betsy's Calculated, stating that Call the Doctor "is in no way a mellowed piece of work. What makes it the fullest, most mature album any riot grrrl performer has produced isn't Tucker abandoning her anger (the idea that anger is incompatible with maturity is a facile one), but rather Tucker starting (reluctantly) to register the contingencies and compromises that her ideologically based rage is inadequate to confront". Similarly, prominent music critic Robert Christgau praised the album's raucous energy, commenting: "Powered by riffs that seem unstoppable even though they're not very fast, riding melodies whose irresistibility renders them barely less harsh, Corin Tucker's enormous voice never struggles more inspirationally against the world outside than when it's facing down the dilemmas of the interpersonal—dilemmas neither eased nor defined by her gender preferences, dilemmas as bound up with family as they are with sex."

AllMusic reviewer Jason Ankeny commented: "Forget the riot grrrl implications inherent in the trio's music — Call the Doctor is pure, undiluted punk, and it's brilliant". Johnny Huston, writing for Spin, remarked that Call the Doctor "trades sex-worker role-playing, doll parts, gender-bending, and other common female-rock tropes for stories of everyday struggle [...] Sleater-Kinney proves that punk still offers new ways to say no". The album appeared at number three in The Village Voice's Pazz & Jop critics' poll for 1996. In 2010, Call the Doctor was ranked number 49 in the list of the 100 greatest albums of the nineties by the editors of Rolling Stone.

== Track listing ==
All music is composed by Carrie Brownstein and Corin Tucker.

No.	Title	Length
1.	"Call the Doctor"	2:30
2.	"Hubcap"	2:25
3.	"Little Mouth"	1:44
4.	"Anonymous"	2:29
5.	"Stay Where You Are"	2:24
6.	"Good Things"	3:10
7.	"I Wanna Be Your Joey Ramone"	2:37
8.	"Taking Me Home"	2:35
9.	"Taste Test"	3:00
10.	"My Stuff"	2:33
11.	"I'm Not Waiting"	2:21
12.	"Heart Attack"	2:12
Total length:		30:04

== Personnel ==
Credits are adapted from Call the Doctor's album notes.

- Corin Tucker – vocals, guitar, drums (on "Heart Attack")
- Carrie Brownstein – guitar, vocals (on "Call the Doctor", "Stay Where You Are", "I Wanna Be Your Joey Ramone" and "Heart Attack")
- Lora Macfarlane – drums, vocals (on "Hubcap", "Stay Where You Are", "Taste Test"), guitar (on "Heart Attack")
- John Goodmanson – producer

Macfarlane was incorrectly credited with vocals on "Taking Me Home" (she actually sang on "Taste Test") Brownstein is listed as "Carrie Kinney".
