= Mosaic (Love of Diagrams album) =

Studio album by Love of Diagrams
- Released: April 10, 2007
- Genre: Indie rock
- Label: Matador

Love of Diagrams chronology
The Target Is You (2003)	Mosaic (2007)	Nowhere Forever (2009)

Professional ratings
Review scores
Source	Rating
AllMusic	4/5 stars
Pitchfork Media	(7.6/10)
Stylus Magazine	B

Mosaic is an album by Australian indie rock band Love of Diagrams. It was released in 2007 by Matador Records.

== Track listing ==
1. "Form and Function"
2. "The Pyramid"
3. "Pace or the Patience"
4. "At 100%"
5. "Interlude"
6. "Ms v. Export"
7. "Confrontation"
8. "Single Cable"
9. "Double"
10. "All the Time"
11. "Trouble"
12. "What Was I Supposed to Do"
13. Unnamed Bonus Track
