= Sleater-Kinney (album) =

Studio album by Sleater-Kinney
- Released: June 25, 1995
- Studio: 486 Victoria Street in Melbourne, Australia
- Genre: Punk rock; riot grrrl
- Length: 22:45
- Label: Chainsaw
- Producer: Tim Green; Sleater-Kinney

Sleater-Kinney chronology
| Sleater-Kinney (1995) | Call the Doctor (1996) |

Sleater-Kinney is the debut studio album by the American rock band Sleater-Kinney, released on June 25, 1995 by Chainsaw Records. The album received favorable reviews from critics.

== Recording and release ==
Sleater-Kinney was recorded by Nick Carrol at 486 Victoria Street in Melbourne, Australia, and produced by Tim Green and the band at the Red House in Olympia, Washington. The album was released in 1995 by the queercore independent record label Chainsaw Records. By March 1996, the album had sold 1,000 copies according to singer and guitarist Corin Tucker. Nielsen SoundScan reported in February 2015 that the album had sold 25,000 copies in the U.S.

== Critical reception ==
Professional ratings
Review scores
| Source | Rating |
|---|---|
| AllMusic | 3/5 stars |
| Christgau's Consumer Guide | A− |
| Pitchfork | 7.8/10 |
| The Rolling Stone Album Guide | 3/5 stars |

Sleater-Kinney received favorable reviews from music critics. AllMusic reviewer Zach Curd stated that the album "is a medium-fi blast of thrashy riot grrrl rock. Some tracks are reminiscent of [1990s] Sonic Youth ('Be Yr Mama'), while others are just blasts of punk angst ('A Real Man'). The group suffers from excessively monotone melody lines, but succeeds with their overall confidence and an understanding of dynamics that is promising". In a more positive review, prominent music critic Robert Christgau commented, "while their same-sex one-on-ones aren't exactly odes to joy, they convey a depth of feeling that could pass for passion."

== Track listing ==
All music is composed by Carrie Brownstein and Corin Tucker.

| No. | Title | Length |
|---|---|---|
| 1. | "Don't Think You Wanna" | 1:53 |
| 2. | "The Day I Went Away" | 3:04 |
| 3. | "A Real Man" | 1:04 |
| 4. | "Her Again" | 2:20 |
| 5. | "How to Play Dead" | 2:06 |
| 6. | "Be Yr Mama" | 2:52 |
| 7. | "Sold Out" | 1:16 |
| 8. | "Slow Song" | 2:00 |
| 9. | "Lora's Song" | 2:29 |
| 10. | "The Last Song" | 3:37 |
| Total length: | | 22:45 |

== Personnel ==
- Corin Tucker – vocals, guitar
- Carrie Brownstein (listed as "Carrie Kinney" on the album) – guitar, vocals on 2, 5 10
- Lora Macfarlane – Drums, vocals and guitar on 9
