= Bird Blobs =

Australian rock band

- Origin: Melbourne, Australia
- Genres: Garage rock/Post punk
- Years active: 2000–2006
- Labels: Art School Dropout; Unstable Ape; Sounds of Sweet Nothing (UK)
- Past members: see members list
- Website: Official website Larinerg

Bird Blobs were a garage rock/post punk musical group from Melbourne, Australia. They formed in 2000 with Tim Evans and Ian Wadley as the core and only continuous members of the group. The first self-titled recording was performed with Evans on drums, with Wadley and Evans overdubbing the other instruments. Subsequently, this recording was disowned by the band. Duncan Haigh joined briefly as a live drummer but was eventually replaced by Tom Egg as the band's first permanent drummer. The lineup was filled out by the inclusion of Karl Scullin on bass. With this lineup, the Bird Blobs recorded an unreleased album in 2002, and then released their debut "official" album Stihl Life in April 2003. The album was recorded by Simon Grounds (Rocket Science, Venom P. Stinger) at Sublime Studios in Melbourne. The rhythm section was subsequently replaced, and the final lineup included Evans, Wadley, bassist Jordan Redaelli and drummer Steve Masterson. With this lineup they recorded the second self-titled full-length album, which was released in September 2004. The album was recorded at Woodstock Studios in Melbourne with US engineer Casey Rice (Tortoise, Liz Phair), and later mixed by Simon Grounds. Both their albums were released through the independent Tasmanian label Unstable Ape. Their second self-titled album was also released on UK independent label, Sounds of Sweet Nothing.

The band have toured the United States, the UK and Europe, including playing the All Tomorrow's Parties music festival in December 2004. In 2005 the band supported Nine Inch Nails on the Australian leg of their Live: With Teeth Tour. The band appeared on numerous compilations, with their song "Billy" featured on the compilation CD Mojo Beyond Punk, attached to the February 2005 edition of Mojo magazine and in 2006 the Bird Blobs song, "Inbred Disco", was used in the soundtrack for the Australian film Suburban Mayhem. Bird Blobs dissolved whilst on tour, and have not publicly expressed any intentions of reforming, with Evans relocating to New York City.

Bird Blobs re-formed to play three shows in Melbourne in March 2014. The lineup was Evans, Wadley, Masterson and King.

== Members ==
- Tim Evans — vocals, guitar (2000–2006)
- Ian Wadley — guitar (2000–2006)
- Nigel King — bass (2003)
- Steve Masterson — drums (2003–2006)
- Jordan Redaelli — bass (2003–2006)
- Tom Egg — drums (2001–2003)
- Karl Scullen — bass (2001–2003)
- Duncan Haigh — drums (2000–2001)

== Discography ==
- Bird Blobs — Independent (2001)
- Stihl Life — Unstable Ape (UAR026) (4 April 2003)
- Bird Blobs — Unstable Ape (UAR036) (6 September 2004)
