= Love of Diagrams =

Australian rock band

- Origin: Melbourne, Victoria, Australia
- Genres: Post punk; no wave; indie rock
- Years active: 2001–present
- Labels: Unstable Ape; Matador; Passport
- Members: Monika Fikerle; Luke Horton; Antonia Sellbach

Love of Diagrams are an Australian indie rock band formed in 2001. Their sound is characterised by a mix of energetic drumming, angular guitar and bass riffs, and call-and-response vocals.

== History ==
Love of Diagrams were formed in Melbourne in 2001 by Monika Fikerle on drums, Luke Horton on guitar and vocals, and Antonia Sellbach on vocals and bass guitar. The trio were described by Heather Phares of AllMusic, as providing "a fiery, angular sound that recalls post-punk greats like Siouxsie and the Banshees and Pylon." Locally, they "made a name for themselves with their kinetic live act and consistent touring."

In 2003, they released their debut instrumental album, The Target Is You, on local-based Unstable Ape Records, which received much critical acclaim. They then played an extensive tour throughout Europe and Japan. Whilst touring across Australia, they supported international bands including, Death Cab for Cutie, Electrelane, Les Savy Fav, Stereolab, The Rogers Sisters and Sonic Youth.

They released their first extended play, We Got Communication, in 2004 which is their first work to feature vocals. Its five tracks included three new songs and two remixes of other tracks. Amazon.com editorial reviewer opined "the new vocal material certainly matches the high energy of their original instrumental work." Two tracks from the EP were also released on a 7" vinyl single, "No Way Out", in the UK through The Passport Label, and the band played a handful of London shows in November 2005. "No Way Out" was used on an episode of The O.C. in season three, "The Game Plan".

Their self-titled EP was released in September 2006 on Unstable Ape Records, in the United States in January 2007 via Matador Records, and the United Kingdom in February. Brian Howe of Pitchfork rated it at 6.2 out of 10 and explained, "[the group] have met what seems to be their goal: to resurrect the still-awesome power of classic UK post-punk for the umpteenth time. [However, the] visceral thrills are accompanied by the nagging frustration that, out of the countless ways you can combine guitars and drums, so many bands are choosing this exact one."

Whilst in the US, they recorded their second album, Mosaic, in Chicago with producer Bob Weston, which was their first studio album for Matador Records. It was released in Australia in February 2007 and everywhere else in April. Pitchfork's Roque Strew rated it at 7.6 and declared, "With mad scientific precision, they clone that factory-town aura of blankness and unrest, as well as the bohemian suspicions of structure and prettiness for its own sake." The band returned to the US to support tours for Ted Leo and the Pharmacists and Enon and two performances at SXSW festival in Austin, Texas which were the highlight for English disc jockey Steve Lamacq.

Their third album, Nowhere Forever, was produced by Ryan Hadlock at Bear Creek Studios in Seattle and a companion 7" single, "Forever", were both released in August 2009.

== Members ==
- Monika Fikerle – drums
- Luke Horton – guitar, vocals
- Antonia Sellbach – vocals, bass guitar

== Discography ==
=== Studio albums ===
- The Target Is You (Unstable Ape Records, 2003)
- Mosaic (Matador Records, February 2007)
- Nowhere Forever (Unstable Ape/Remote Control, August 2009)
- Blast (Bedroom Suck Records, 2015)

=== Extended plays ===
- We Got Communication (Unstable Ape Records, 2004)
- Love of Diagrams (Unstable Ape Records, 2006)
  - Love of Diagrams EP (Matador Records, January 2007)

=== Singles ===
- "No Wy Out" (The Passport Label, UK 7" Vinyl 2005)
- "Forever" (August 2009)
- "In My Dream" 2011. 7"
