= Ninetynine =

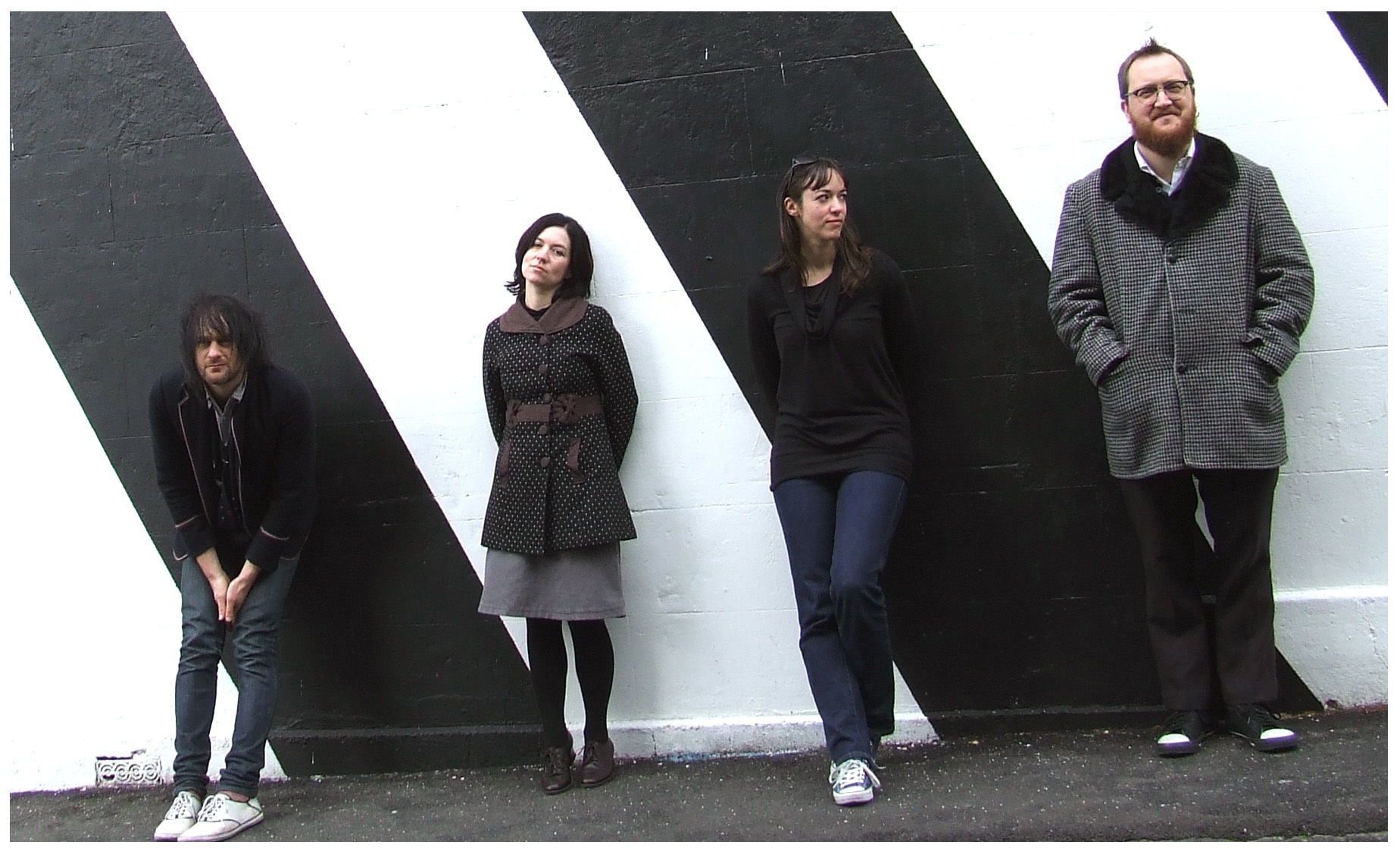
- Ninetynine in 2010

Background information
- Origin: Melbourne, Victoria, Australia
- Genres: Indie rock
- Years active: 1996–present
- Labels: Patsy; Unstable Ape; If Society; Endearing; Chapter; Radio One; Stick Figure; Sones; Dark Beloved Cloud; Trifekta
- Members: Laura MacFarlane; Cameron Potts; Meg Butler; Iain McIntyre
- Past members: Rhonda Simmonds; Michelle Mansford; Amy Clarke
- Website: Ninetynine Bandcamp page

Ninetynine (styled as ninetynine) are an Australian indie rock band based in Melbourne. The band was founded by Laura MacFarlane, who played drums in Sleater-Kinney, in 1996 as a solo project. The first album, 99, was recorded with her playing all the instruments. Not long after she assembled a band with Cameron Potts, Rhonda Simmonds (who has since left the group) and Iain McIntyre (who played with Laura in several earlier bands). Other former members of the band include Michelle Mansford and Amy Clarke. Meg Butler joined in 2006.

Ninetynine's music has been described as art-pop, combining elements of indie rock, post punk and power pop with strong melodic elements and a playful approach. Some of their songs incorporate experimental elements such as unusual time signatures or exotic scales. One of the band's trademarks is the use of Casiotone keyboards and chromatic percussion (typically a vibraphone) in their music, with the musicians frequently swapping instruments between songs, even sometimes in the middle of songs.

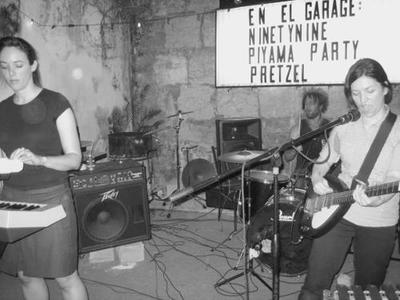
Ninetynine Performing in Mexico 2007

== Live shows and tours ==
Ninetynine have played live extensively in Australia, and toured internationally in New Zealand, Japan, the UK, Europe and North America.

== Discography ==
Ninetynine The Triantiwontigongolo – Ninetynine EP CD 1996 (Woozy)

Ninetynine 99 CD 1996 (Patsy/Endearing )

Ninetynine 767 CD and LP Album 1998 (Patsy/Endearing/Chapter)

Ninetynine Girl Crazy – Woekender LP 1998 (Remedial Records)

Ninetynine Ersatz Split 7" 1999 (Radio One)

Ninetynine 180 Degrees CD and LP 2000 (Patsy/ Radio One)

Ninetynine Vivian Girls Split 7" 2001 (Chapter)

Ninetynine Anatomy of Distance CD 2002 (Patsy/Stckfigure)

Ninetynine The Process CD and LP 2002 (Trifekta/Appliances & Cars)

Ninetynine Receiving the Sounds of Science Fiction CD EP 2003 (Dark Beloved Cloud)

Ninetynine World of Space World of Population World of Robots CD 2006 (UAR/Stickfigure)

Nineytynine Chapter 99 – Compilation CD 2006 (Sones)

Ninetynine Silo EP 2008 (Patsy)

Ninetynine Bande Magnetique CD 2010 (Patsy)

Ninetynine Woods 7" 2016 (Patsy)

Ninetynine Further 7" and CD 2016 (Patsy)

Ninetynine albums are released through the band's own label Patsy. Some albums have been previously released through other labels such as Chapter Music, Trifekta, Stickfigure, Unstable Ape, If Society and Endearing Records.

They also have recorded a number of tracks for various compilations. Anatomy of Distance is a retrospective compilation of tracks recorded for various compilations and 7" singles between 1997 and 2001. Receiving the Sounds of Science Fiction was released exclusively to subscribers of the New York-based Dark Beloved Cloud single club. Chapter 99 (Sones, 2006) was a compilation of previously released songs. Original releases of 99, 767 and 180 degrees came in hand-folded sleeves made of printed card. The release of Further was part of the band's 20th anniversary celebrations.
