= Millennium (disambiguation) =

A millennium is 1000 years.

Millennium may also refer to:

== Arts and entertainment ==
=== Books ===
==== Comics ====
- Millennium (comics), a series produced by DC Comics
- Millennium Publications, a defunct comic book publisher
- Millennium, Vampire Nazi regiment in the Hellsing manga series
- Millennium Items, magical relics in the manga series Yu-Gi-Oh!

==== Fiction ====
- The Millennium, a 1924 novel by Upton Sinclair
- Millennium, a 1976 novel in the Chet Kinsman series by Ben Bova
- Millennium (novel), a 1983 science fiction novel by John Varley
- Millennium, a 1995 novel by Jack Anderson
- Millennium (novel series), circa 2005, a series of novels spawning from a trilogy created by Stieg Larsson, also made into films, and continued by others

==== Non-fiction ====
- Millennium: A History of Our Last Thousand Years, a 1995 book by Felipe Fernández-Armesto
- Millennium (Holland book), 2008, by historian Tom Holland
- Millennium: Journal of International Studies, an academic periodical published from 1971–present

=== Television and film ===
- Millennium (film), 1989 film based on the short story "Air Raid" by John Varley
- Millennium (TV series), 1996 television series by The X-Files creator Chris Carter
  - Millennium Group, a fictional centuries old secret society and criminal investigative consulting firm in the Millennium television series
- Millennium (miniseries), 2010 Swedish miniseries based on the film adaptations of Stieg Larsson's Millennium series
- "The Millennium" (Seinfeld), 1997 episode from the eighth season
- "Millennium" (The X-Files), 1999 episode from the seventh season
- CNN Millennium, 1999 television series on human history from the 11th to the 20th centuries
- Millennium: Tribal Wisdom and the Modern World, 1992 documentary series by anthropologist David Maybury-Lewis
- Millennium Entertainment, American independent film distributor
- Millennium Falcon, fictional starship from the Star Wars films

=== Music ===
==== Bands ====
- The Millennium (band), a 1960s American band led by Curt Boettcher
- Millennium (Indian band), a heavy metal band from Bangalore, India
- Millenium (Polish band), a progressive rock band from Poland

==== Albums ====
- Millennium (Backstreet Boys album), 1999
- Millennium (Earth, Wind & Fire album), 1993
- Millennium (Front Line Assembly album), 1994
- Millennium (Monstrosity album), 1996

==== Songs ====
- "Millennium" (Front Line Assembly song), a 1994 industrial metal song
- "Millennium" (song), a 1998 song by Robbie Williams
- "Millennium", 1994 song by Killing Joke from Pandemonium

==== Other uses in music ====
- Millennium Records, a record label

=== Video games ===
- Millennium 2.2, a 1989 resource management game for Atari ST, Amiga and the PC
- Millennia: Altered Destinies, a PC game created by Take 2 Interactive in 1995
- Millennium (video game series), a Japanese series launched in 2009
- Millennia (video game), a 2024 PC 4X turn-based strategy game
- Millennium Four: The Right, a cancelled video game from GT Interactive

== Companies ==
- Millennium BCP, a private bank in Portugal
- Millennium Chemicals, a subsidiary of Lyondell Chemical Company
- Millennium Interactive, a former games company, maker of James Pond and other games
- Millennium Management, LLC, a hedge fund and a multistrategy investment management firm
- Millennium Media, an American film studio
- Millennium Pictures, an Australian production company
- Millennium Books, an imprint of UK publisher Orion Publishing Group
- Millennium Pharmaceuticals, a biopharmaceutical company in Cambridge, MA
- Millennium & Copthorne Hotels, a global hospitality company
- Tokio Millennium Re Ltd., a reinsurance company

== Events ==
- Millennium celebrations, a worldwide series of events celebrating New Year's Eve 1999–2000
- Millennium Summit, a meeting among several leaders from September 6–8, 2000
- Operation Millennium, a very large air raid in the Bombing of Cologne in World War II
- Millennium Magic, a UK Rugby League event
- Millennium '73, a religious festival held by the Divine Light Mission at Astrodome featuring Guru Maharaj Ji
- Walt Disney World Millennium Celebration, a celebration at Walt Disney World for the year 2000
- 2000 millennium attack plots, a series of Islamist terror plots planned around New Year's Eve 1999–2000

== Non-profit organizations ==
- Millennium Development Goals, a compact among nations to end human poverty
- Millennium Kids, an international youth empowerment environmental organization
- White House Millennium Council (US)
- Millennium Science Initiative, an international project to build scientific research capability in Brazil, Chile, and Uruguay

== Places ==
- Millenium Camera, a landmark in Tumamoc Hill, Tucson, Arizona
- Millennium Complex, a building in Plymouth, England
- Millennium Park, Chicago park and entertainment venue
- Millennium High School (disambiguation), several US high schools
- Millennium (planet) or Tau Boötis Ab, an extrasolar planet in the Tau Boötis system
- Millennium Force, a roller coaster at Cedar Point in Sandusky, Ohio
- Millennium Stadium in Cardiff, Wales, UK
- Millennium Tower (disambiguation)
- Millennium Transmitter, broadcast transmitter tower of ABS-CBN Corporation in the Philippines

== Prizes ==
- Millennium Prize Problems, seven problems in mathematics stated by the Clay Mathematics Institute
- Millennium Technology Prize, a technology prize awarded by Technology Academy Finland

== Religion ==
- Millennialism, describing the 1000-year reign of Christ
- Millenarianism, the belief by a group in a coming major transformation of society after which all things will be changed
- Tertio millennio adveniente, an apostolic letter in preparation for the Roman Catholic Church's Great Jubilee

== Software ==
- Millennium bug, a.k.a. Y2K or Year 2000 problem, a data storage problem from the practice of abbreviating a four-digit year to two digits
- Windows ME, Windows Millennium Edition, an operating system
- Millennium, an integrated library system software package published by Innovative Interfaces, Inc.

== Transportation ==
- Edel Millennium, a South Korean paraglider design
- Millennium (ship), a cruise ship
- Millennium train, an electric train run by Sydney Trains in Sydney

== Other ==
- Millennium stamp, a postage stamp issued to celebrate the beginning of the 3rd millennium, or to commemorate a millennium associated with a country's history
- New Millennium Program, a NASA program to test new technologies
- Millennium, an unusually strong beer made by Boston Beer Company
- Millennium Run, also known as Millennium simulation, an astrophysical simulation created to investigate how the universe evolved over time
- Millennium (sculpture), a 2001 sculpture by Mathis Lidice

== See also ==
- Millennials, a name given to Generation Y, a demographic cohort
- Millennium Tower (disambiguation), the name of a number of buildings around the world
- Millennium Park (disambiguation), a few parks in North America
- Millennium Bank (disambiguation)
- Millennium Bridge (disambiguation)
- Millennium Institute (disambiguation)
- Willennium, a 1999 album by Will Smith
