= 1,000 years =

1,000 years may refer to:

- A millennium, a period of 1,000 years
- 1,000 Years, an album by the Corin Tucker Band
- 1000 Years, an extended play by Savoy
- 1,000 Years and 1 Day, an album by Robyn Miller
- "A Thousand Years" (Christina Perri song)
- "1000 Years", a song by Bush from The Art of Survival, 2022

== See also ==
- A Thousand Years (disambiguation)
- Millennium (disambiguation)
