= A set =

A set may refer to:

- Sydney Trains A set, a type of train
- List of poker hands#Three of a kind
