= A Thousand Years (disambiguation) =

"A Thousand Years" is a song by Christina Perri.

A Thousand Years may also refer to:

- "A Thousand Years" (Sting song)
- "A Thousand Years" (Tom Dice song)
- "A Thousand Years", a song by Lamb of God from the album Into Oblivion
- "A Thousand Years", a song by Toto from the album The Seventh One
- A Thousand Years, an art installation by Damien Hirst

== See also ==
- 1,000 Years, a 2010 album by the Corin Tucker Band
- Millennium (disambiguation)
- Ten thousand years (disambiguation)
