= Half a World Away =

Half a World Away may refer to:

- Half a World Away (album), a 2008 album by Hateful Monday
- "Half a World Away" (R.E.M. song), from the 1991 album Out of Time
- "Half a World Away" (Esthero song), from the 1998 album Breath from Another
- "Half a World Away" (Corin Tucker Band song), from the album 1,000 Years
- Half a World Away (miniseries), a 1991 Australian TV miniseries about the 1934 MacRobertson Air Race

== See also ==
- "Half the World Away", a song by Oasis
