= Fábio Spina =

Legal director of Gerdau and a member of the CNJ

Fabio Spina
- Born: Fábio Eduardo de Pieri Spina; 28 September 1972 (age 53); São Paulo, State of São Paulo, Brazil
- Years active: 1994–present

Fábio Eduardo de Pieri Spina (São Paulo, state of São Paulo, Brazil; 28 September 1972), better known as Fábio Spina. He is legal director of Gerdau, member of the human rights observatory of the national council of justice (CNJ) and chairman of the legal and economic competitiveness commission of the B.O.

== Biography ==
Fábio was born in Brazil, in São Paulo, the grandson of German immigrants, he grew up in São Paulo and was a water polo and jiu-jitsu athlete.

He studied at the German school Colégio Visconde Porto Seguro. He received a law degree from the University of São Paulo, a master's degree from Columbia University in New York, an MBE in France, and held various positions in large companies in Brazil and around the world.

== Career ==
He was previously CEO of CSN, Vice President of Corporate Finance Legal at The Kraft Heinz Company, and Head of Global Ethics and Compliance at The Kraft Heinz Company. He was director and director of companies of the AGN Participações group, global legal director and head of institutional relations of Vale SA At Anheuser-Busch Inbev (Ambev), he held the position of vice president of investor relations, having previously worked in the group Suzano and in law firms in Brazil and the United States.

He was a member of the board of trustees of the Millennium Institute. Professor at Insper, he was a member of the legal advisory board of the same institution, executive vice president of the Brazil-China economic council, member of the board of directors of IBRAM (Brazilian Institute of Mining), of the Vale-Columbia University sustainable development center and member of the advisory council of the Getúlio Vargas Foundation – FGV. He graduated in Law from the University of São Paulo in 1994, obtained an LLM (Master of American Laws, Harlan Fiske Stone Scholar) from Columbia University Law School in New York in 1997, and an MBAby INSEAD in Fontainebleau, France in 2002.
