= Millennium Institute =

Millennium Institute may refer to:

- Millennium Institute (Hungarian Think Tank), a culturally oriented policy-advising group
- Instituto Millenium, a Brazilian think tank
- Millennium Institute (Auckland), where Peter Winter was Head Coach of Athletics
- Millennium Institute (Washington), headed by Hans Rudolf Herren
- Institutes established under the Millennium Science Initiative in Brazil, Chile, and Uruguay
