= Millennium Point =

Millennium Point may refer to:

- Millennium Point, Birmingham, England
  - Millennium Point tram stop
- Millennium Point (New York City)

== See also ==
- Millennium Tower (disambiguation)
