= Auburn Maintenance Centre =

Train depot in New South Wales

Auburn Maintenance Depot
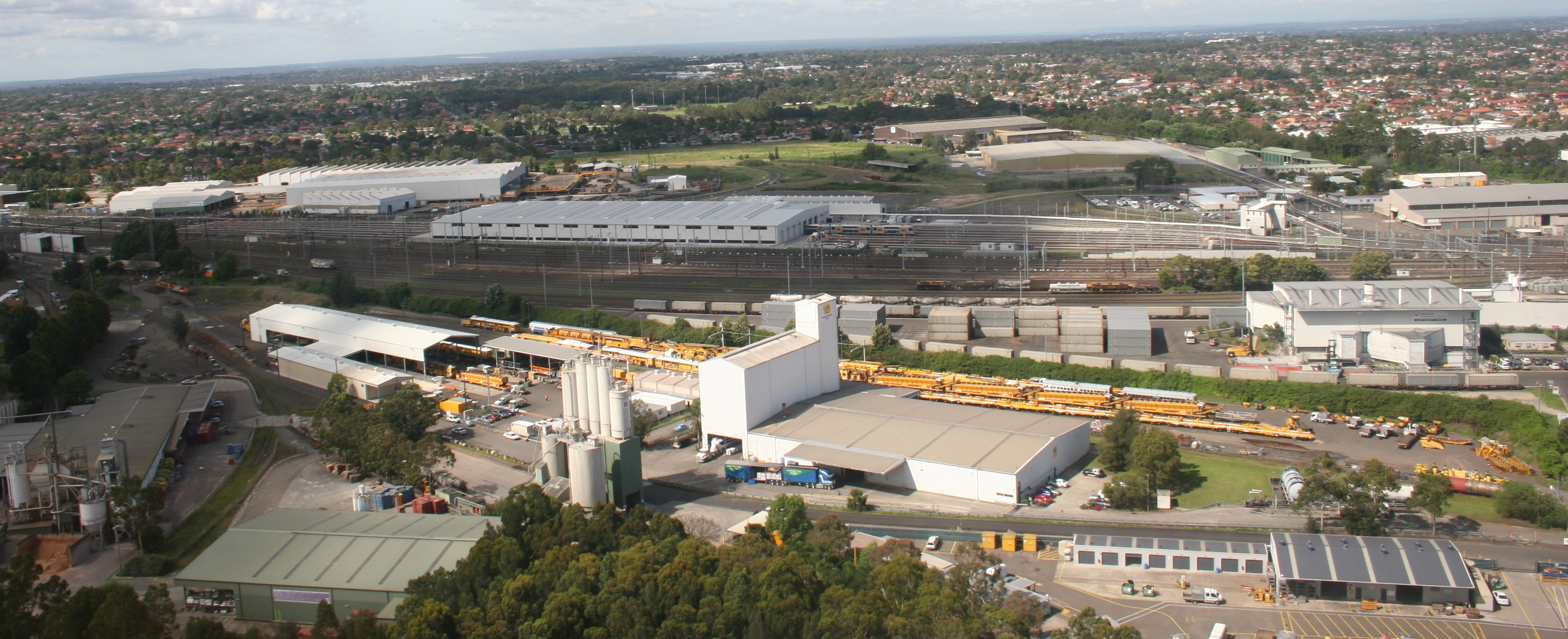
- Northbound view with Auburn Maintenance Centre in the middle in December 2010

Location
- Location: Auburn

Characteristics
- Owner: Transport Asset Manager of New South Wales
- Operator: Downer Rail
- Roads: 7
- Rolling stock: A sets B sets M sets

History
- Opened: 24 July 2010

The Auburn Maintenance Centre is a train depot operated by Downer Rail responsible for the maintenance of the Sydney Trains A, B and M set fleets.

== History ==
As part of the contract to build and maintain the Sydney Trains A sets, John Holland built a depot on the site of the former Clyde Marshalling Yards adjacent to the MainTrain facility. It was opened by Minister for Transport John Robertson on 24 July 2010.

On 20 September 2014, an 11 road stabling facility was established to the south-east of the facility. Provision has been made for an extra five roads. In February 2017, it was revealed that subsidence had occurred underneath the depot after plastic cells had failed. Remediation costs have been estimated as high as $70 million.

During 2018, maintenance of the Sydney Trains M set fleet was moved to Auburn from Eveleigh Railway Workshops.

== Description ==
The maintenance centre building has seven roads. It has stabling facilities on either side with the whole facility stretching for two kilometres.

== Maps ==
Auburn Maintenance Centre.
