= Ten thousand years (disambiguation) =

Ten thousand years primarily refers to an expression used in various East Asian languages to wish long life.

Ten thousand years, 10,000 years, or similar may also refer to:

- 10,000 Years (album), a 2003 album by The Honeydogs
- "Ten Thousand Years" (99% Invisible), episode 114 of the podcast
- "10,000 Years in India", a concept in the Puranic chronology of South Asia

== See also ==
- 10,000 years ago
- A Thousand Years (disambiguation)
