= Kill My Blues =

Studio album by Corin Tucker Band
- Released: September 18, 2012
- Genre: Alternative rock
- Length: 41:36
- Label: Kill Rock Stars
- Producer: Seth Lorinczi

Corin Tucker Band chronology
1,000 Years (2010)	Kill My Blues (2012)

Singles from Kill My Blues
- 1. "Groundhog Day" Released: July 25, 2012; 2. "Neskowin" Released: July 31, 2012

Kill My Blues is the second solo album by Corin Tucker (of Sleater-Kinney) and her band, released on September 18, 2012 by Kill Rock Stars.

== Background and recording ==
According to Rolling Stone, "...her band also made Kill My Blues a more collaborative effort than its predecessor. Instead of Tucker bringing in finished songs, she jammed out ideas in a rehearsal space with drummer Sara Lund, guitarist Seth Lorinczi and bassist Mike Clark." As Tucker herself puts it on the Kill Rock Stars website, "After the past two years playing together, traveling and making music, I think we’re more comfortable," and "We collaborated on every song on this record and no one was shy about their ideas. I think you can hear that sense of joy and abandon in the songs."

== Reception ==
The album received mostly positive reviews, in particular from Robert Christgau, a longtime fan of Sleater-Kinney, who gave it an A−. In addition, Blurt was very positive, giving it a 9 out of 10 and saying "This follow-up is even better & louder [than 1000 Years], on par with the dizzying heights of her old band." This Is Fake DIY was less enthusiastic, giving the album a score of 6 out of 10 and saying, "Instead of killing her blues, perhaps Corin Tucker needs to embrace them." Likewise, Consequence of Sound found the album lacking, giving it a C− grade and saying that on it, "Most of the time, though, the rage in her voice mismatches with the overly glammy, sleek material, lacking the wildness that made her first band so important."

Professional ratings
Aggregate scores
Source	Rating
Metacritic	78/100
Review scores
Source	Rating
AllMusic	4/5 stars
Blurt	9/10
Consequence of Sound	C–
Filter	83%
MSN Music (Expert Witness)	A−
The Observer	3/5 stars
Pitchfork	6.5/10
Slant	3.5/5 stars
This Is Fake DIY	6/10
Under the Radar	7.5/10

== Promotion ==
The album was promoted by a tour lasting from September 13 to October 13, starting in Minneapolis and ending in her hometown of Portland, Oregon.

== Track listing ==
1. Groundhog Day - 2:29
2. Kill My Blues - 3:58
3. Neskowin - 4:34
4. I Don't Wanna Go - 2:41
5. Constance - 3:49
6. No Bad News Tonight - 2:05
7. Summer Jams - 4:20
8. None Like You - 4:11
9. Joey - 4:28
10. Outgoing Message - 2:15
11. Blood, Bones, and Sand - 3:06
12. Tiptoe - 3:40

== Personnel ==
- Sara Lund – drums
- Mike Clark – bass
- Seth Lorinczi – engineer, guitar, keyboards, producer
- Robin Clark – artwork, design

== Charts ==
Chart (2012)	Peak position
US Heatseekers Albums (Billboard)	23
