= New South Wales A and B sets =

Class of electric trains operating in Sydney, Australia

A and B sets
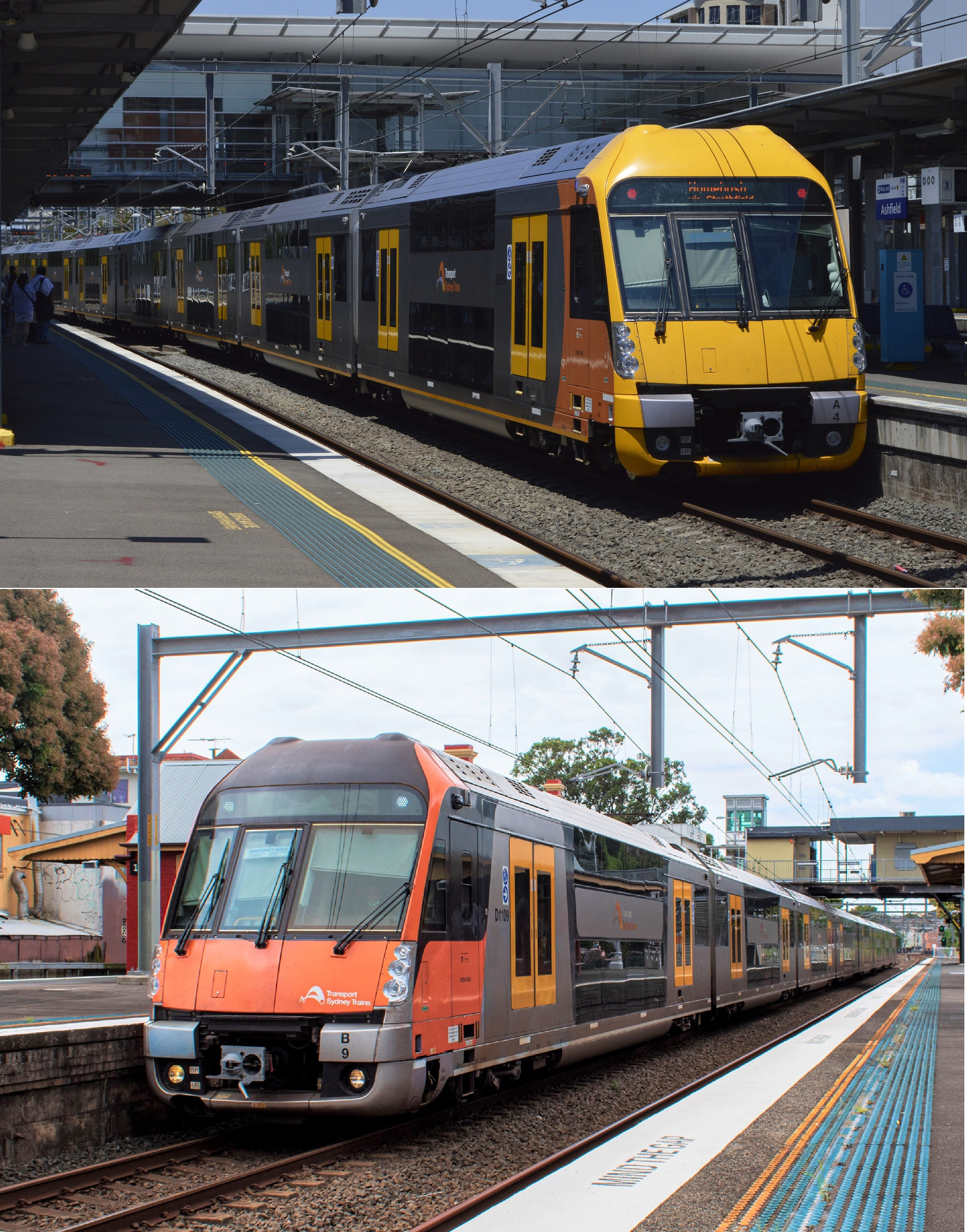
- A4 at Ashfield (top) and B9 at Carlton (bottom)

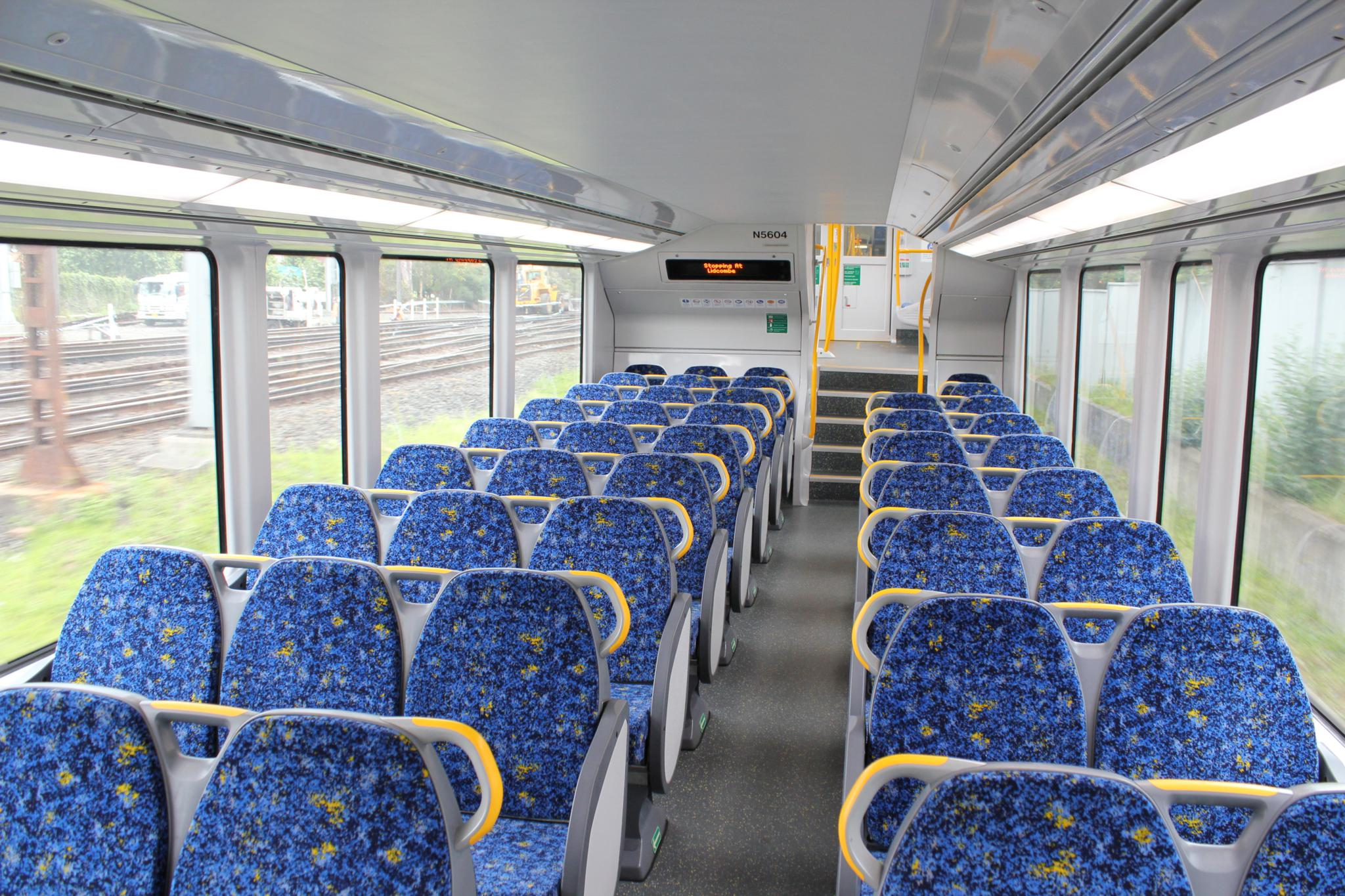
- Lower deck of an A set
- Stock type: Electric multiple units
- In service: 1 July 2011–present (A sets); 7 September 2018–present (B sets)
- Manufacturers: Downer Rail; CRRC Changchun; Hitachi Rail
- Assembly: Cardiff, Australia
- Built at: Changchun, China
- Replaced: S sets (A1-A3-A78-A80, B1-B24); C sets (B25-B41)
- Constructed: 2010–2014 (A sets); 2017–2021 (B sets)
- Entered service: 1 July 2011 (A sets); 7 September 2018 (B sets)
- Number built: 79^{1}/_{2} A sets (636 carriages); 41 B sets (328 carriages)
- Number in service: 78 A sets (624 carriages); 41 B sets (328 carriages)
- Number scrapped: 10 carriages (8-car set A2, (Note: Replaced by A80 due to an acid spill) 2 prototype motor cars)
- Formation: 119 8 car sets D–N–N–T–T–N–N–D
- Fleet numbers: A1, A3–A78, A80; B1–B41
- Capacity: 894 seated including 16 wheelchair spaces (101 in driving cars, 118 in power cars, 110 in trailer cars); 1200 nominal peak; 2150 fully loaded (single destination/special event)
- Operator: Sydney Trains
- Depots: Auburn; Hornsby
- Lines served: North Shore & Western; Leppington & Inner West; Liverpool & Inner West; Cumberland; Olympic Park (weekends, public holidays and special events); Airport & South; Northern

Specifications
- Car body construction: Stainless steel
- Train length: 163.1 m (535 ft 1 1/4 in)
- Car length: 20,732 mm (68 ft 1/4 in) (D); 20,243 mm (66 ft 5 in) (N); 20,332 mm (66 ft 8 1/2 in) (T)
- Width: 3,035 mm (9 ft 11 1/2 in)
- Height: 4.41 m (14 ft 5 5/8 in)
- Floor height: 1.27 m (50 in) (rail top to floor); 1.97 m (77 1/2 in) (between floor and roof)
- Doors: Plug-style, 2 per side
- Wheel diameter: 940 mm (37 in)
- Wheelbase: 2.3 m (7 ft 6 1/2 in)
- Maximum speed: 143 km/h (89 mph) (design); 130 km/h (81 mph) (service)
- Weight: 407 t (401 long tons; 449 short tons)
- Axle load: 17 t (17 long tons; 19 short tons)
- Traction system: Hitachi 2-level IGBT–VVVF spread spectrum modulation
- Traction motors: 16 × Hitachi 183 kW (245 hp) 3-phase AC induction motor
- Power output: 2,928 kW (3,927 hp)
- Acceleration: 1.03 m/s^{2} (3.4 ft/s^{2})
- Deceleration: 1.05 m/s^{2} (3.4 ft/s^{2}) (service); 1.28 m/s^{2} (4.2 ft/s^{2}) (emergency)
- HVAC: 2 independent cooling units per car: 38 kW (51 hp) cooling, 24 kW (32 hp) heating
- Electric systems: 1,500 V DC (nominal) from overhead catenary
- Current collection: Pantograph
- UIC classification: 2′2′+Bo′Bo′+Bo′Bo′+2′2′+2′2′+Bo′Bo′+Bo′Bo′+2′2′
- Braking system: Knorr-Bremse regenerative brake with blended electro-pneumatic wheel mounted disc brakes
- Safety system: ETCS
- Coupling system: Scharfenberg coupler (non-electrical) on ends; Semi-permanent couplers between cars
- Track gauge: 1,435 mm (4 ft 8 1/2 in) standard gauge

The A and B sets, also referred to as the Waratah trains, are classes of double-decker electric multiple units (EMU) that operate on the Sydney Trains network in New South Wales, Australia. Based on the earlier M sets, the Waratahs were manufactured by a joint consortium between CRRC, Downer Rail and Hitachi, with initial construction taking place overseas in Changchun before final assembly at Downer Rail's Cardiff Locomotive Workshops. The sets were named after the Waratah flower, which is the state's floral emblem.

The initial order for 78 A sets was the largest rolling stock order in Australia's history. These 624 A set carriages make up around half of the Sydney Trains fleet and replaced two-thirds of the 498 S set carriages. Delivery commenced in July 2011 and was completed in June 2014.

An order for 24 additional trains with updated technology and a lightly revised design was placed in December 2016. These are classified as B sets, or colloquially as Waratah Series 2 trains. The delivery of the first order of sets began in September 2018 and was completed in June 2019, while a second and final order of a further 17 sets began in September 2020 and was completed in June 2021.

== Public Private Partnership ==
The A sets were delivered by a joint venture between Downer Rail and Hitachi for Reliance Rail under a Public Private Partnership (PPP). As part of the PPP, Reliance Rail will also maintain the trains for a minimum of 30 years at the purpose-built Auburn Maintenance Centre facility.

Reliance Rail borrowed $2.4 billion at low interest rates before the 2008 financial crisis. Higher interest rates and changes in the financial sector after the GFC meant the company would have difficulty refinancing its debt, leading the Government of New South Wales into talks with Reliance Rail to resolve the financial status of the project. In February 2012 the Government agreed to bail out the project for $175 million by becoming the sole shareholder in 2018.

== Design ==
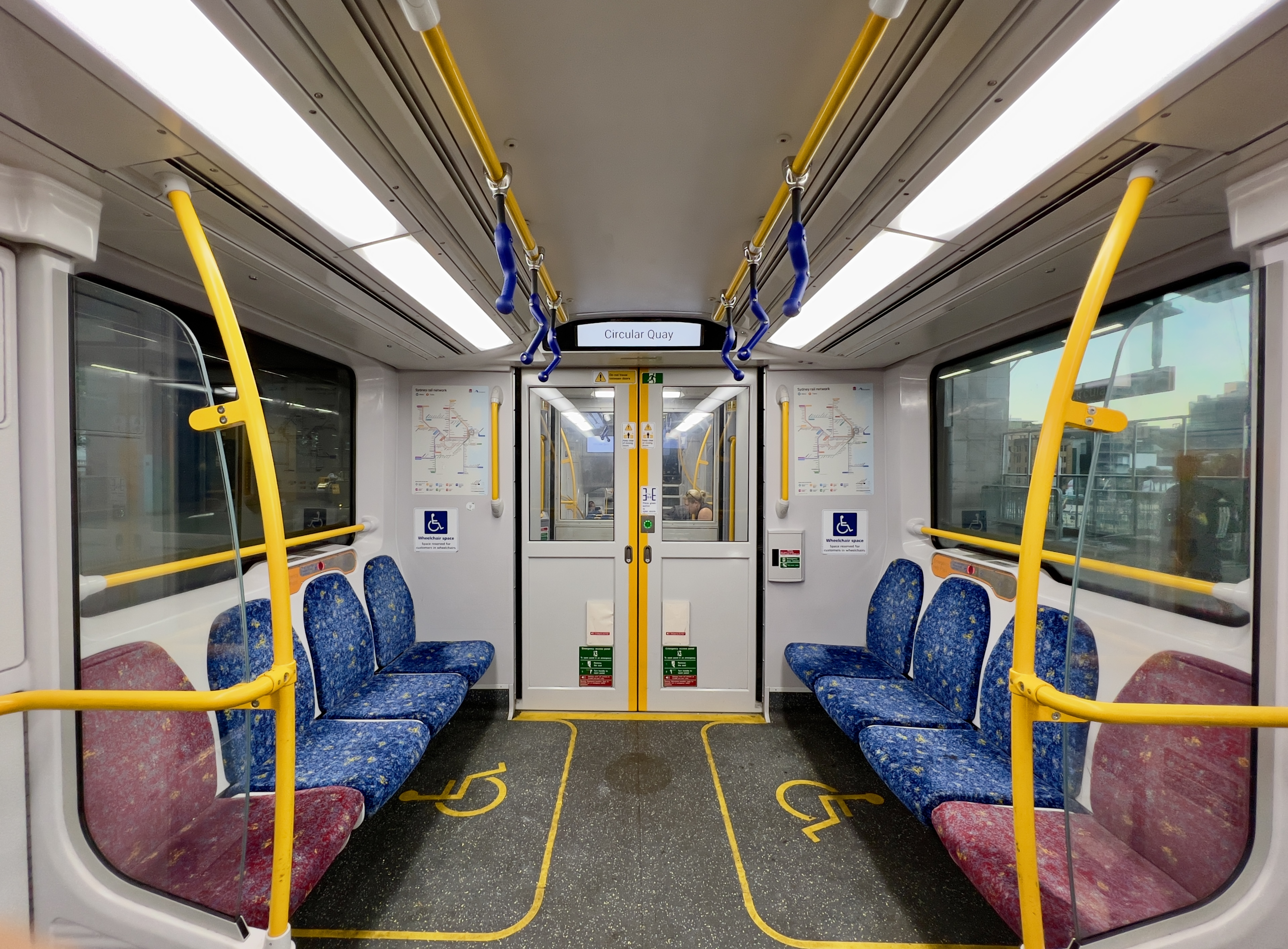
Vestibule

The A sets were jointly designed at the Downer EDI Rail design offices, then at Clyde, New South Wales and Maryborough, Queensland and Changchun Railway Vehicles, with cooperation commencing in January 2008. The sets are formed of eight carriages – a break from the previous standard Sydney practice of four car sets, which are then coupled to form eight-car trains. The configuration is: driving trailer car + motor car + motor car + trailer car + trailer car + motor car + motor car + driving trailer car. This means that guards operate from the rear of the train rather than the centre and that commuters are able to walk through the entire train. The trains include external CCTV cameras to assist guards.

Carriage interiors were designed by Transport Design International. The inside of the train includes additional Emergency Help Points and CCTV cameras compared to older classes. Improvements to the DVAs (Digital Voice Announcements) with differential pitch of the voice allow more natural sounding speech. 'Smart' air-conditioning automatically adjusts to the outside temperature and the number of passengers on board. Accessibility features include 16 wheelchair spaces, portable wheelchair ramps in the end cars, red fabric on priority seating and additional handrails compared to older trains in the fleet.

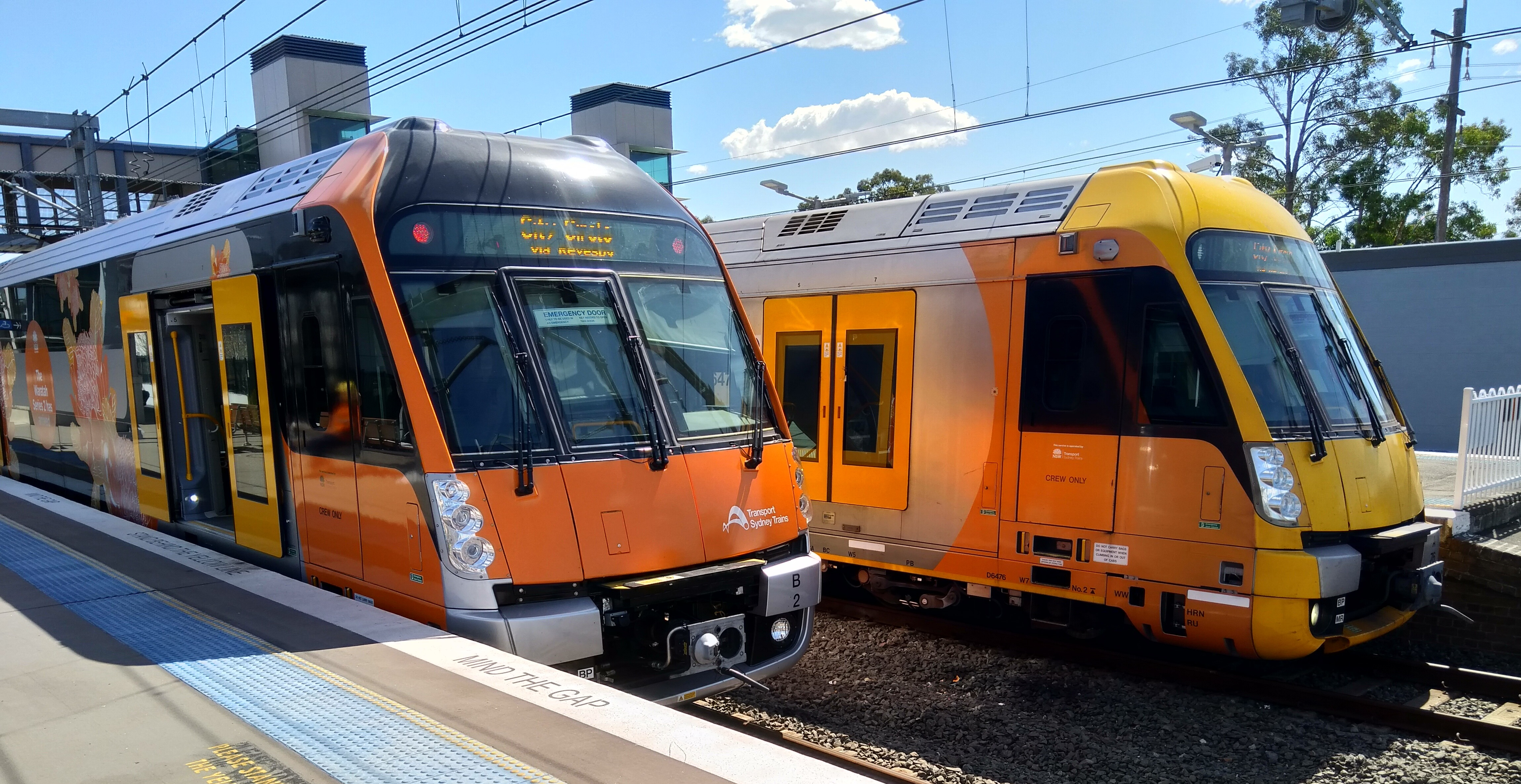
B2 (left) and A76 (right) at Revesby station

The A sets were the first passenger trains in the world to use LED lamps for all lighting (except for headlights). In doing so, the designers managed to remove almost 800 kg (1,800 lb) in reflectors and ballasts associated with fluorescent units, as well as reducing power consumption to around a quarter of that used by fluorescents. Woollen moquette fabric, a durable, vandal-resistant material, is used to cover the train's seats. The seats use specially developed shock absorbers such that the reversing feature is damped – this was a safety feature added to allow reversible seats which would contain passengers in the event of an accident. Detailed design of the train was completed in July 2009.The B sets share more than 90 percent of their design with the original A sets. The trains' exterior is of the same design and construction, but feature a different livery of black, orange and silver wrap applied to the cabs, and side windows. Changes are more prominent internally; the B sets have upgraded computer systems and improved passenger technology, such as updated and additional digital passenger information displays throughout the interior.

== Construction and delivery ==
=== A sets ===
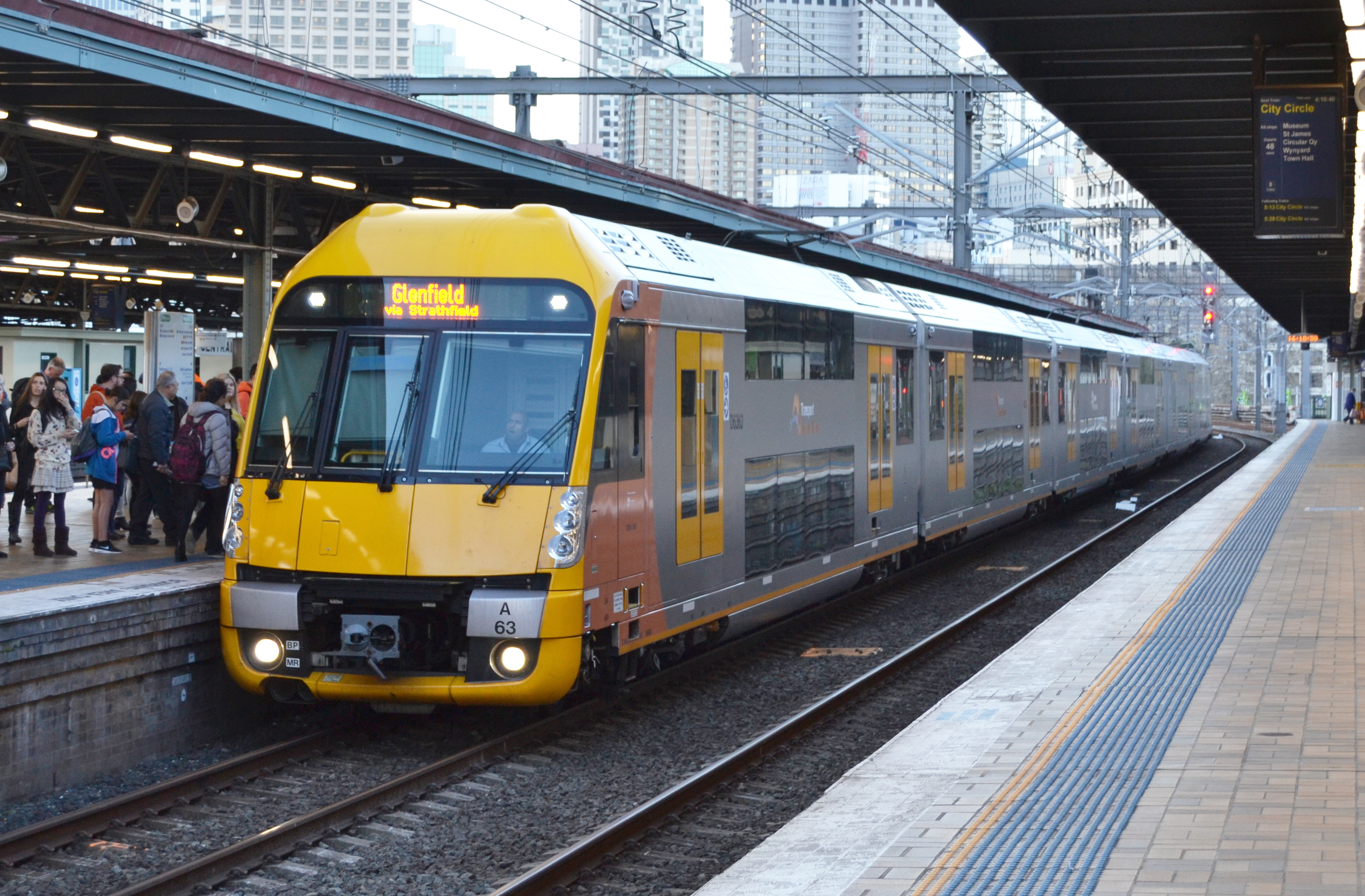
A63 at Central station

The joint venture between Downer EDi Rail and Hitachi was established to design, manufacture and commission the A sets. The stainless steel bodies were partially constructed by CNR Changchun Railway Vehicles in China before being shipped to Downer EDI's Cardiff Locomotive Workshops facility in New South Wales for final assembly, testing and commissioning. This was the first export of any rail vehicle by China to a developed country. The manufacturing facility at Cardiff received an upgrade of over $20 million to cater for the needs of the project. Other infrastructure works included the construction of the Auburn Maintenance Centre and new substations at various locations around the network.

A four car pre-production test train was built to test the train sub-systems and compatibility with the Sydney suburban network. This was intended to allow any issues with the train to be corrected before the production trains entered service. The test train was expected to perform trial runs from mid 2009, but did not begin network testing until April 2010. The pre-production train concluded testing in August 2010. The first production set began network testing in August 2010 and by November 2010, three sets were undergoing testing.

The first trains were scheduled to be introduced in late 2010, but a series of delays pushed back their introduction. The first train intended for service (A3) was delivered to then-operator CityRail for acceptance on 20 April 2011. CityRail had 20 business days to accept or reject the train, but a decision was postponed by two weeks to allow Downer EDi to correct further defects. CityRail rejected the train due to safety concerns and a number of defects. The defects included; 'milky' effect windscreens – apparent when under direct sunlight, poor-quality steel welding as evident in the indents seen on some areas of the carriage exterior, gaps in the plastic moulding, handrails not lining up with stairs and software problems.

Once the majority of the problems were resolved by Downer EDi, CityRail allowed A3 to commence service, though operating under special conditions. It entered service on 1 July 2011, operating its maiden run from Redfern to Macarthur via the City Circle and Airport. Initially, it operated two return services from the city to Macarthur via the Airport line during the off-peak period on weekdays, and all day on the Airport & East Hills and South lines on weekends. On 14 October 2011, A3 became the first Waratah set to operate during peak hours. As more Waratahs became available, the trains were progressively rolled out to most lines of the Sydney suburban network. On 2 June 2014, it was announced that the final A set (A80) had been delivered.

Originally, the Waratahs were intended to replace all 500 S set carriages, but in February 2013 it was revealed that some S sets would still be required in order to provide services on the South West Rail Link. An option existed to extend the order, but in March 2013 the government indicated it would not take this up.

=== B sets ===
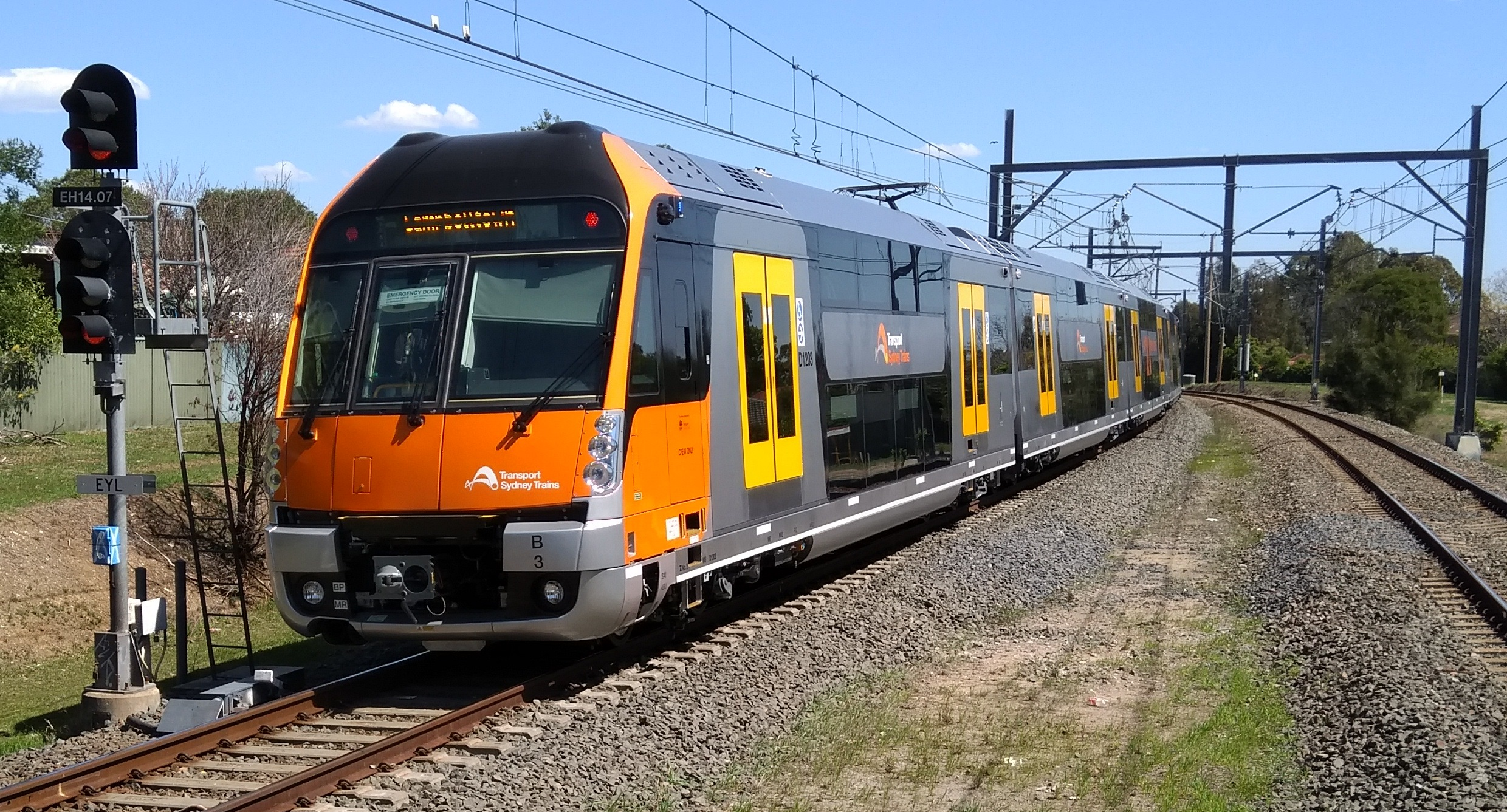
B3 departing Panania

Despite proceeding with the intercity train order, the New South Wales Government announced on 1 December 2016 that 24 new suburban trains had been ordered. Known as the Sydney Growth Trains during development, the trains are officially classified as B sets.

The $1.7 billion contract was awarded to Downer EDI (now Downer Group). CRRC Changchun designed various improvements to the trains, then manufactured and assembled the trains in China on Downer's behalf. Upon arrival in Australia, the trains were taken to Downer's facility at Cardiff, where commissioning works were performed.

Downer Rail will maintain the trains for a minimum of 25 years. As many as 45 additional sets may be added to the order at a future date. The trains were originally to be based at the Mortdale Maintenance Centre, but in late 2017 it was decided that the trains would instead be based alongside the A sets at the Auburn Maintenance Centre. Nevertheless, work to upgrade the Mortdale Maintenance Centre continued.

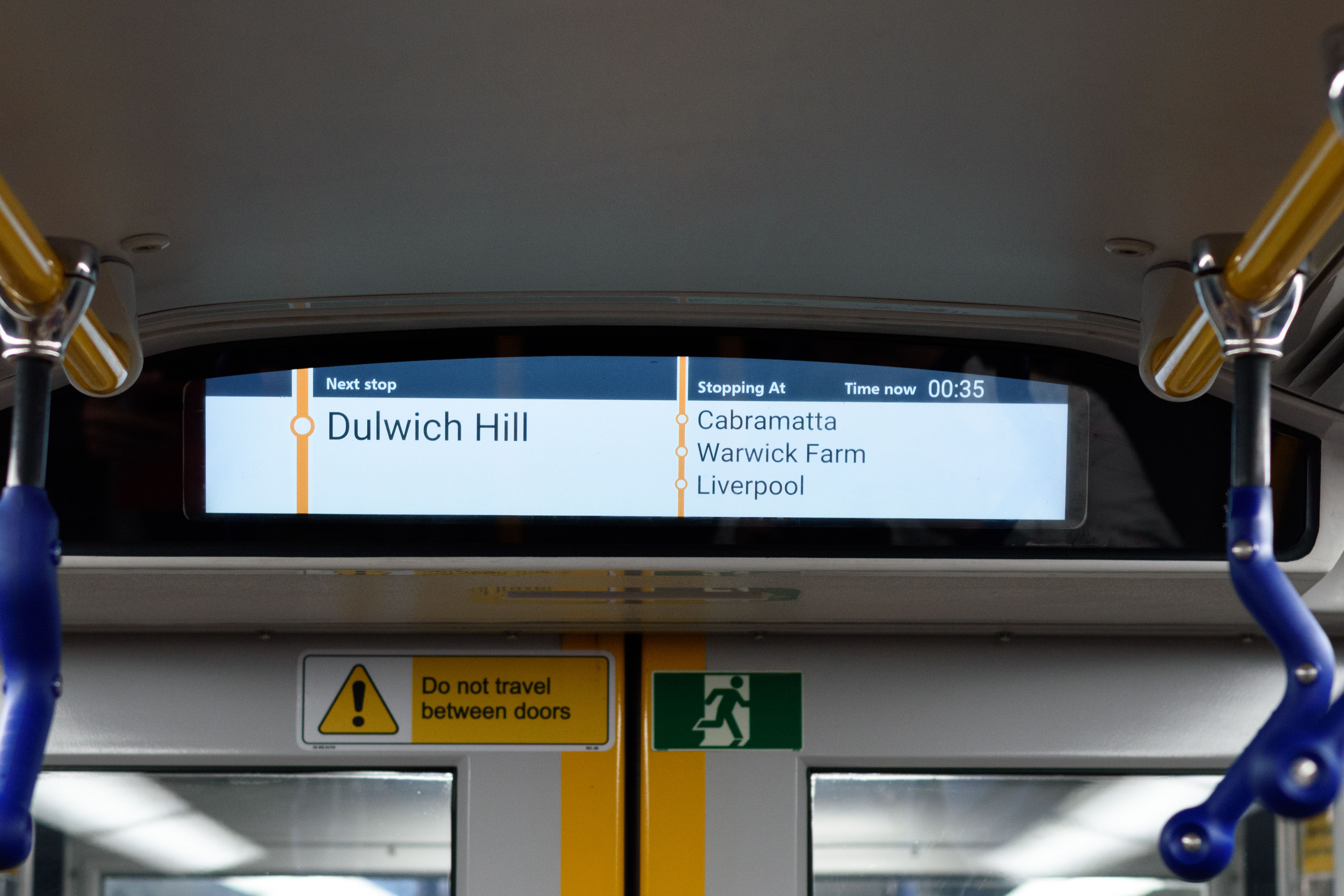

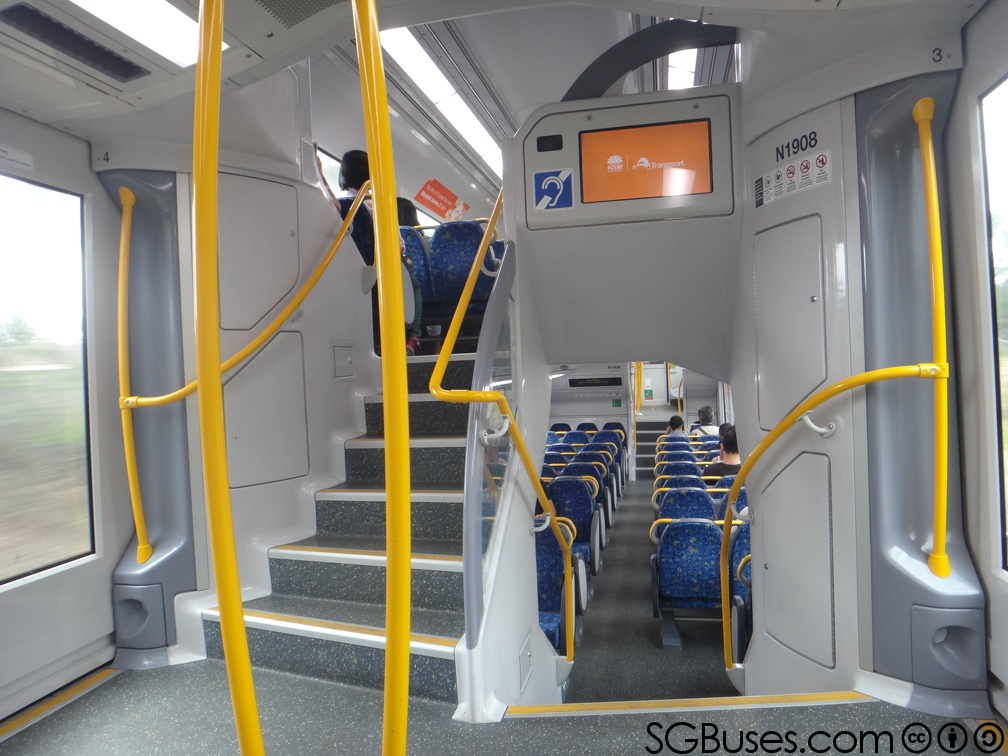
Revamped LCD destination boards on a B set. Screens are also incorporated above the stairwell

The B sets incorporate improved air conditioning, accessibility and internal lighting, with new and revised features such as LCD Indicators and LCD video screens as well as more than 90 internal and external CCTV cameras. Upgrades to the train's computer systems are the most significant changes between the original A sets and the updated B sets. There are also various external livery and colour changes that differentiate the newer B sets from the original A sets.

The first B set to be delivered was unveiled to the media in March 2018. Set B2 was the first to enter revenue service on 7 September 2018, beginning with a run from Granville to Liverpool. On 18 September 2018, B2 became the first Waratah Series 2 to operate during peak hours. By June 2019, all the 24 B sets were delivered and had replaced the 48 remaining S sets.

In February 2019, a further 17 B sets were ordered, with the first two trains delivered to Australia in July 2020. The first of the 17 entered service in September 2020. By September 2020, B25 commenced service, making it the first arrival of the second and final order of the B sets. These further deliveries allowed for the retirement of the C sets in February 2021. The final B set, B41, was delivered and entered service in June 2021.

== In service ==
=== Formation ===
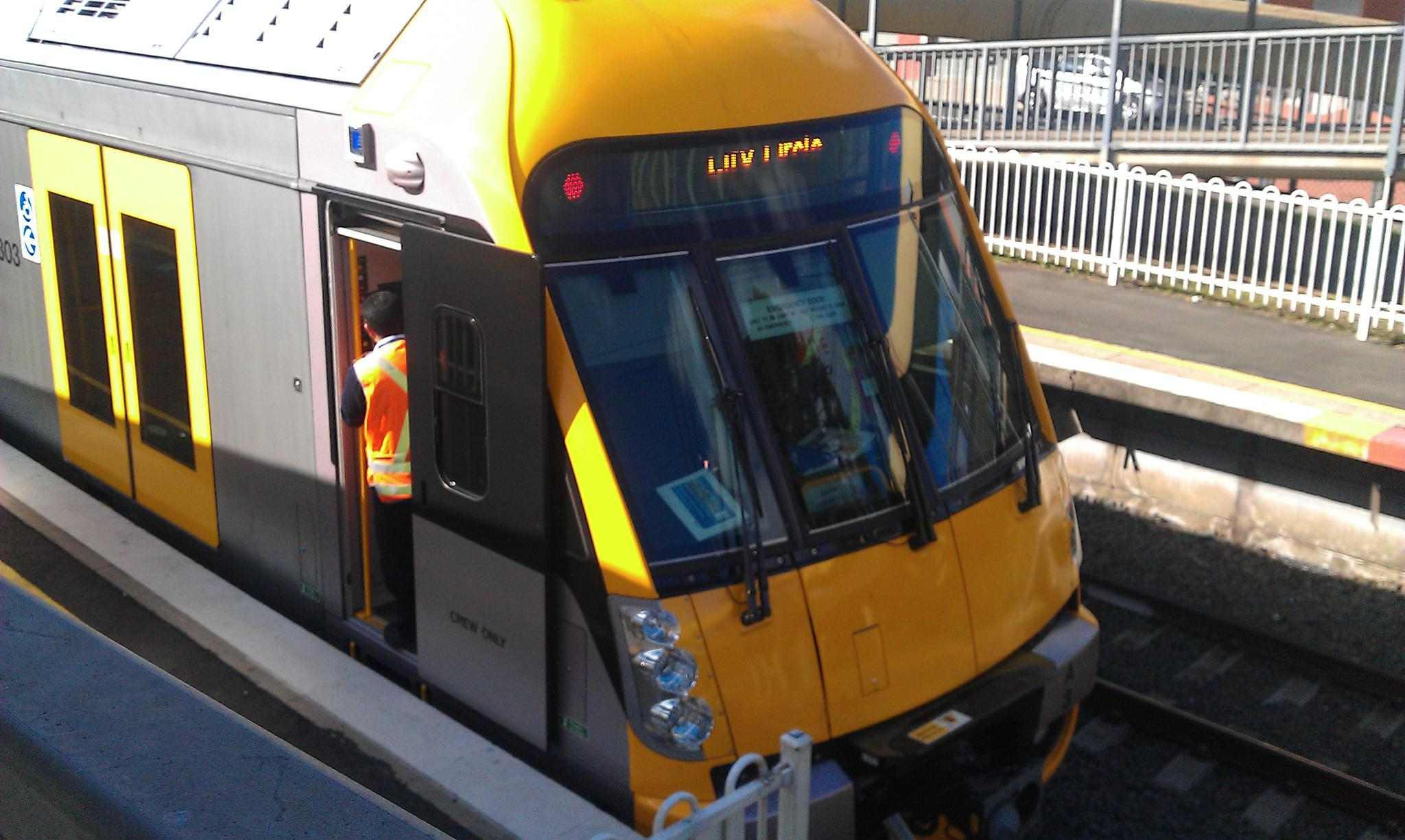
The train's guards' compartment is located in the last driving carriage

The 626 carriages form 78 eight car sets (numbered A1, A3 to A78 and A80) with 2 spare driving car. Individual vehicles are numbered as follows:

- A1: D6301–N5301–N5501–T6501–T6601–N5601–N5401–D6401
- A3: D6303–N5303–N5503–T6503–T6603–N5603–N5403–D6403

up to

- A14: D6314–N5314–N5514–T6514–T6614–N5614–N5414–D6414
- A15: D6315–N5315–N5515–T6515–T6615–N5615–N5415–D6342 (Note: Replacement for D6415)
- A16: D6316–N5316–N5516–T6516–T6616–N5616–N5416–D6416

up to

- A41: D6341–N5341–N5541–T6541–T6641–N5641–N5441–D6441
- A42: D6379 (Note: Replacement for D6342)–N5342–N5542–T6542–T6642–N5642–N5442–D6442
- A43: D6343–N5343–N5543–T6543–T6643–N5643–N5443–D6443

up to

- A78: D6378–N5378–N5578–T6578–T6678–N5678–N5478–D6478
- A80: (Note: Replacement for A2)D6380–N5380–N5580–T6580–T6680–N5680–N5480–D6480

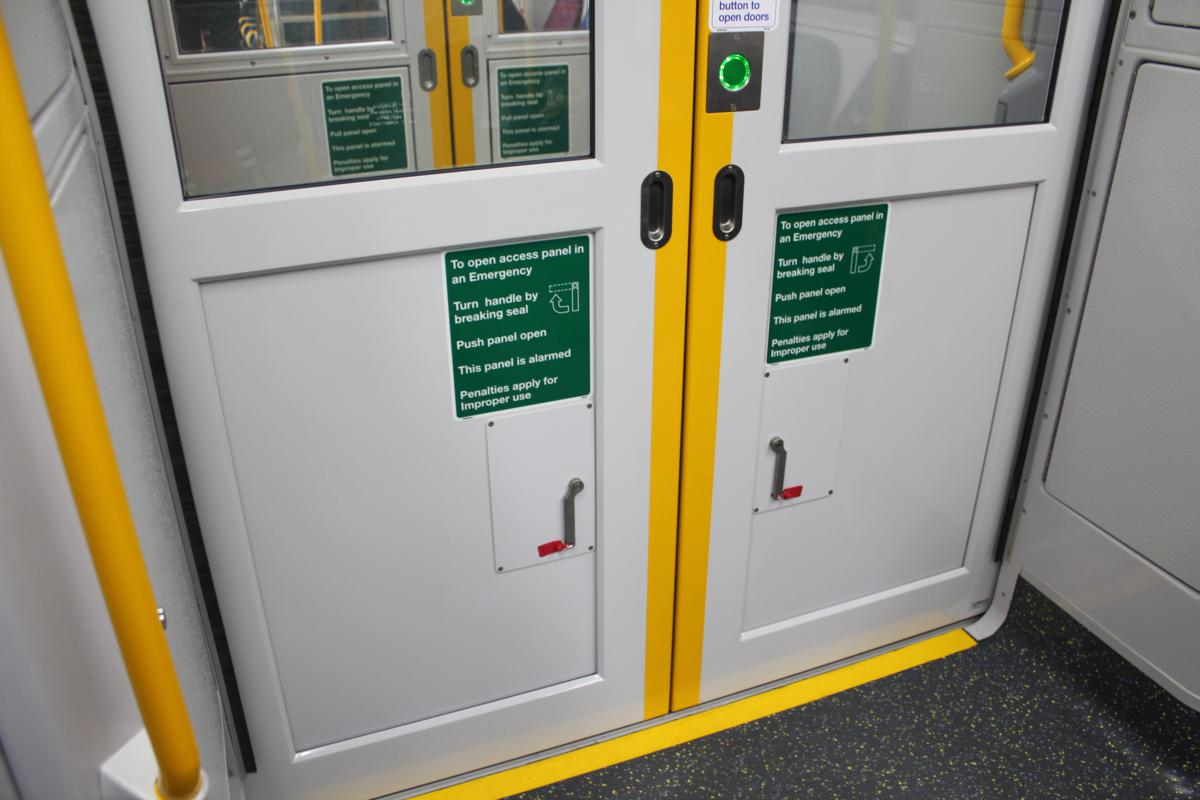
The inter-carriage doors feature a new mechanism for opening during an emergency, in response to McInerney's Report into the Waterfall rail accident recommending the development of alternative emergency exits for passengers

The spare driving car is D6479. This was one of the first four carriages delivered, along with D6379 and scrapped duplicates of N5342 and N5442, and was part of the four car testing and development train. D6379 is replacing D6342 on set A42 after the Richmond incident on 22 January 2018. The now repaired D6342 is replacing D6415 on set A15 as D6415 was damaged in the incident on 25 January 2024 near Vineyard.

The 328 B set carriages form 41 eight carriage sets. Individual vehicles are numbered as follows:

- B1: D1101–N1701–N1901–T1301–T1401–N1801–N1601–D1201

up to

- B41: D1141–N1741–N1941–T1341–T1441–N1841–N1641–D1241

The first 40 A sets (A3 to A42) were delivered to CityRail with the NSW Government's Waratah logo on each carriage. Following the formation of Sydney Trains in July 2013, these were replaced by the Sydney Trains logo and the sides of the train near the driver's cabs were covered with an orange wrap.

Waratahs currently operate on these lines:

- T1 North Shore & Western Line: Berowra, Emu Plains or Richmond to City
- T2 Leppington & Inner West: Leppington or Parramatta to City Circle via Granville
- T3 Liverpool & Inner West: Liverpool to City Circle via Regents Park and Lidcombe
- T5 Cumberland: Leppington to Richmond
- T7 Olympic Park: shuttle service from Lidcombe to Olympic Park on evenings, weekends and public holidays, special event services from Central to Olympic Park
- T8 Airport & South: Macarthur to City Circle via Airport or Sydenham
- T9 Northern Line: Hornsby to Gordon via Strathfield

=== In service incidents and accidents ===
Set A2 is the first and the only Waratah train scrapped. The train was damaged beyond repair due to an acid spill during transfer from China, being rebuilt as A80.

On 14 October 2014, set A29 was extensively damaged after it was trapped by rising flood waters at Bardwell Park, water reached up to the door level. Many electrical components underneath the train were destroyed and repairs took several months to complete.

On 23 October 2014, set A22 derailed when it ran over a set of catch points near Mulgrave. The train only had minor damage, was repaired and it soon returned to service.

On 12 March 2015, set A19 was driven more than 700 m (2,300 ft) in the wrong direction at Mount Druitt. At the time of the incident, a Pacific National freight train was travelling towards the train on the same line. The cause of the incident was likely attributed to driver fatigue, and prompted a review of train crew rostering policies. No passengers were onboard set A19 at the time of the incident, and no injuries were reported as both trains were stopped in time.

On 20 March 2017, carriage N5508 on set A8 suffered an explosion in a traction inverter unit at Burwood. The cause was found to be a faulty capacitor in the inverter. The carriage was subsequently repaired and set A8 later returned to service.

On 22 January 2018, set A42 hit the buffers at the end of the track on platform 2 at an approximate speed of 35 kilometres per hour (22 mph) at Richmond station just before 10am. The train then lurched backwards, causing passengers who were readying to disembark, to fall and injure themselves. The impact caused extensive frontal damage, some of the carriages to lift and gangways between carriages to become crushed. The damage was such that the train could only be moved out of the platform after several days and it needed to be split into 2/3 carriage segments to be towed to Downer Rail at Cardiff. Sixteen patients in total, including the train driver and another crew member were treated. None of the injuries were considered life-threatening. Inspection of set A42 was undertaken following the incident, with the train's event recorders taken for analysis and interviews being conducted with the train's crew. Set A42 has since been repaired and returned to service on 27 March 2019, with the driver carriage (D6342) that hit the stop buffer replaced with a spare from the prototype train (D6379).

On 5 September 2018, set A18 hit and killed a man at Riverwood while he was illegally on the tracks.

On 6 May 2020, set A53 hit and damaged infrastructure at Yennora.

On 10 March 2023, carriage D6373 on set A73 suffered damage to its windscreen, destination screen and pantograph after bringing down power lines at Panania.

On 25 January 2024, set A15 crashed into a trailer at Level Crossing Road at Vineyard, south of Windsor. Set A15 returned to service in March 2024 with the driver carriage (D6415) damaged in the collision replaced with the repaired driver carriage (D6342) involved in the Richmond accident.

On 21 April 2024, set A32 went through a track turnout near Blacktown at 101km/h, well beyond the 25km/h speed limit of that turnout. No damage of the train was observed in post incident inspection.

On 16 January 2025, set A12 derailed near Clarendon. No injuries were reported and the cause of the derailment is still under investigation.

On 20 May 2025, set B3 suffered from a broken pantograph that brought down overhead wires near Homebush, causing major delays affecting other lines.

== Criticism ==
=== Noise concerns ===
In 2021, residents in Waverton and Wollstonecraft complained about excessive squealing made by Waratah trains, relative to other trains in the fleet, as well as their horns. Noises as high as 100 decibels were recorded at one point, with the noise being largely attributed to train wheels flanging as the vehicle rounded bends. Sydney Trains responded that it was working to reduce noise in the area.

=== CRRC Uyghur slave labour scandal ===
In March 2020, a report from the Australian Strategic Policy Institute highlighted 82 companies directly or indirectly using Uyghur slave labour. Included in this was KTK Group, a supplier to train manufacturer CRRC. The report indicated that this had been occurring since 2019. A spokesperson for Downer said the company had investigated serious allegations in early 2020, and that CRRC strongly denied the use of Uyghur labour. CRRC would be one of 11 companies placed onto a United States blacklist in July 2020.

Senior public servants made multiple trips to the CRRC Changchun plant in 2017 and 2018. In September 2018, the NSW Government approved a request for two senior executives from Transport for NSW to visit the CRRC Changchun plant at an estimated cost exceeding $15,000.

In October 2020, Premier of New South Wales Gladys Berejiklian stated that she was concerned over the possibility of Uyghur slave labour being used. The premier stated: "Obviously we’re concerned with that and if there's anything further we need to do I'm sure Transport for NSW will take that action," prompting criticism from the state opposition and Unions NSW.
