= New South Wales M set =

Class of electric train operating in Sydney, Australia

M set
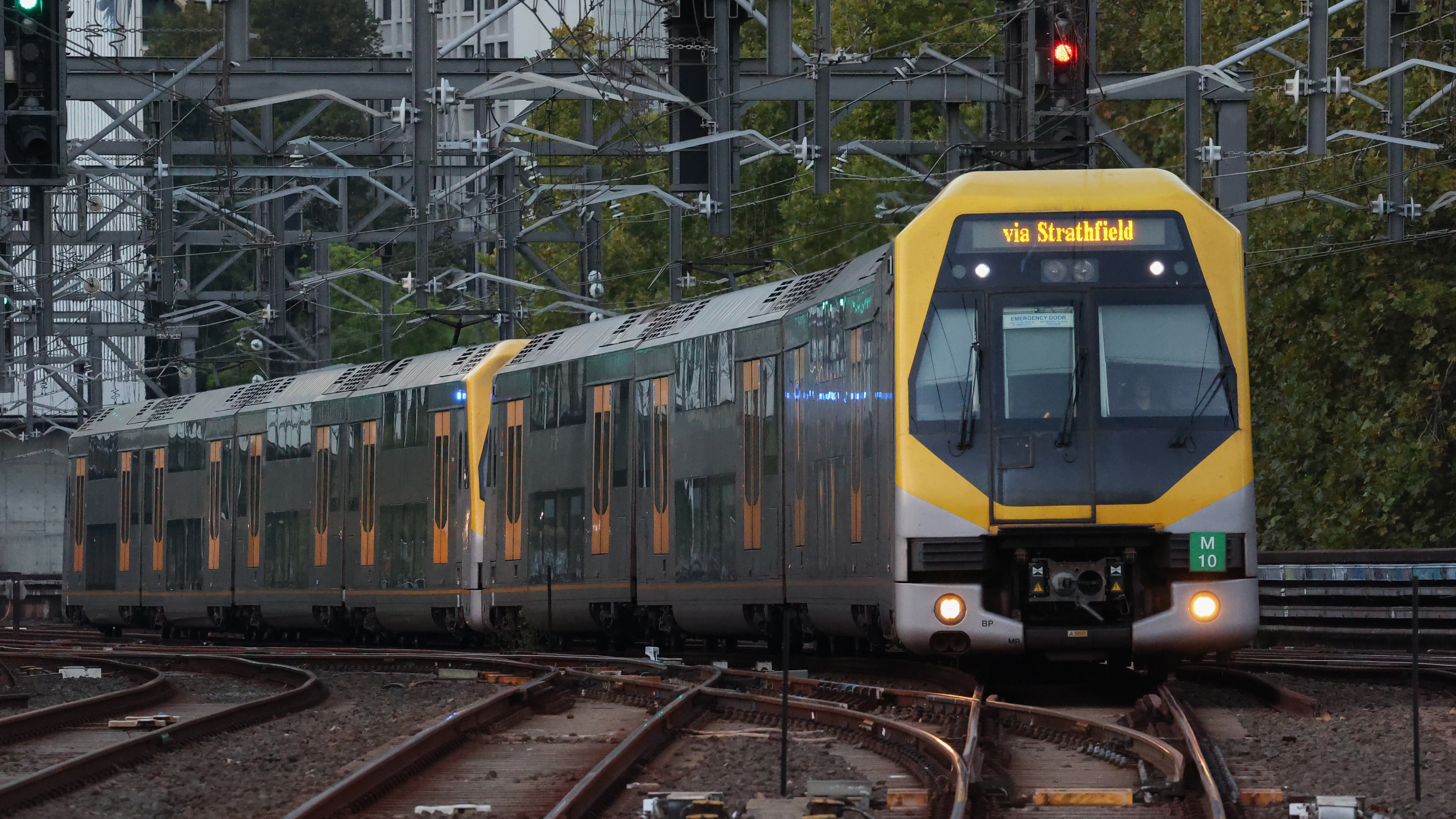
- M10 approaching Sydney Central in March 2024

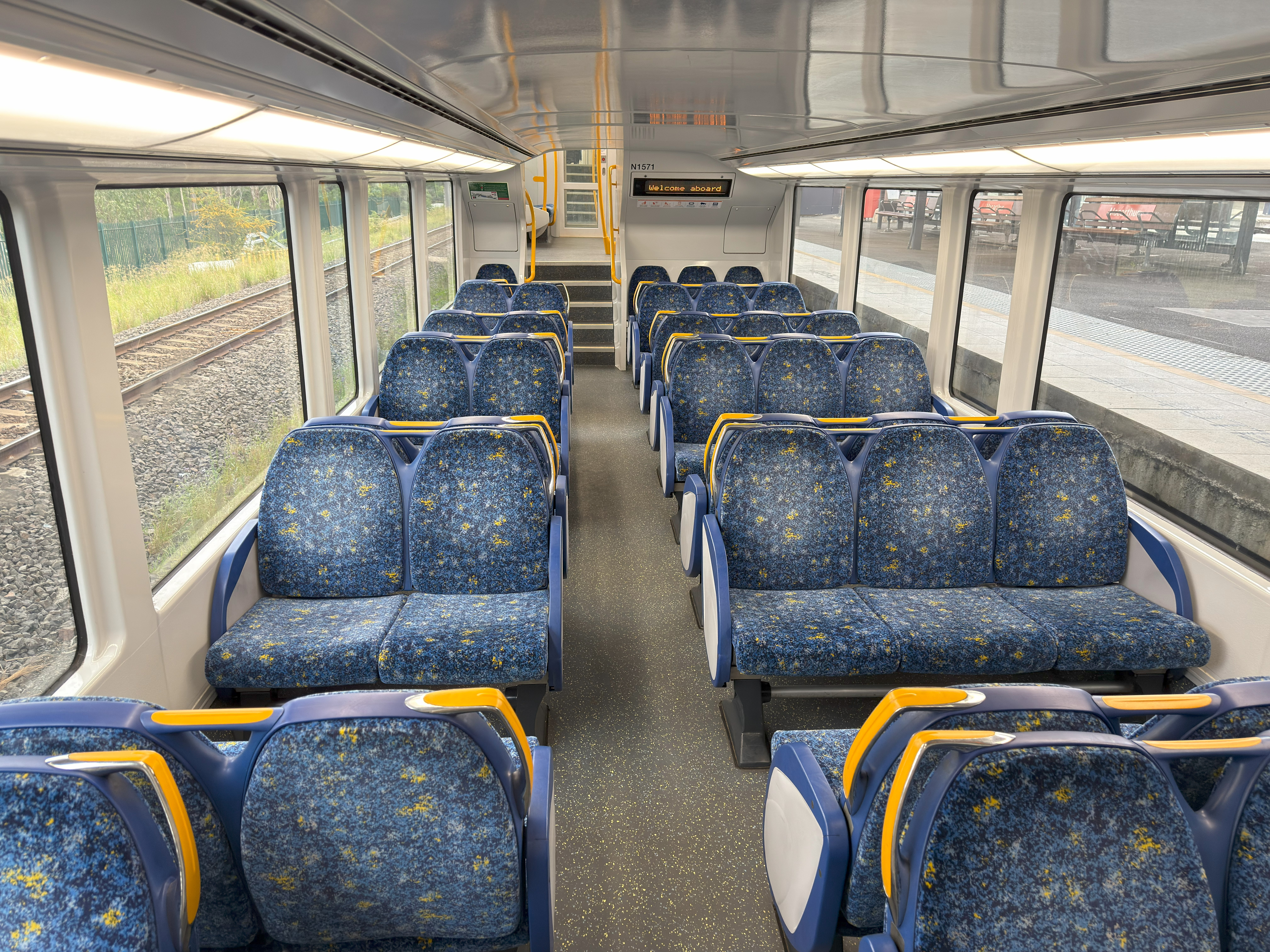
- Refurbished interior
- Stock type: Electric multiple unit
- In service: 2002–present
- Manufacturer: EDi Rail
- Built at: Cardiff
- Replaced: Tulloch double deck carriages
- Constructed: 2002–2005
- Entered service: 1 July 2002
- Refurbished: 2024–present
- Number built: 141 carriages
- Number in service: 140 carriages
- Formation: 35 4-car sets
- Fleet numbers: D1001–D1041, D1043–D1060, D1062–D1073 (driving trailers); N1501–N1540, N1543–N1560, N1562–N1573 (motor cars); M1–M35 (full 4-car sets)
- Capacity: 452
- Operator: Sydney Trains
- Depot: Auburn
- Lines served: Leppington & Inner West; Liverpool & Inner West; Cumberland; Lidcombe & Bankstown; Olympic Park; Airport & South

Specifications
- Car body construction: Stainless steel
- Train length: 81.55 m (267 ft 6 5/8 in)
- Car length: 20,532 mm (67 ft 4 3/8 in) (D); 20,243 mm (66 ft 5 in) (N)
- Width: 3,030 mm (9 ft 11 1/4 in)
- Height: 4,381 mm (14 ft 4 1/2 in)
- Doors: Plug-style, 2 per side
- Wheel diameter: 940 mm (37 in)
- Maximum speed: 143 km/h (89 mph) (design); 130 km/h (81 mph) (service)
- Weight: 207 t (204 long tons; 228 short tons)
- Traction system: Alstom ONIX 1500 2-level IGBT–VVVF
- Traction motors: 8 × Alstom 4-EXA-2144 226 kW (303 hp) 3-phase AC induction motor
- Power output: 1,808 kW (2,425 hp)
- Electric systems: 1,500 V DC (nominal) from overhead catenary
- Current collection: Pantograph
- UIC classification: 2′2′+Bo′Bo′+Bo′Bo′+2′2′
- Braking systems: Automatic air, electropneumatic and regenerative
- Coupling system: Scharfenberg coupler
- Track gauge: 1,435 mm (4 ft 8 1/2 in) standard gauge

The M sets, also referred to as the Millennium trains, are a class of double-decker electric multiple units (EMU) that operate on the Sydney Trains network in New South Wales, Australia. Built by EDi Rail between 2002 and 2005, the first sets initially entered service under the CityRail brand on 1 July 2002 after short delays due to electrical defects. The M sets were built as "fourth generation" trains for Sydney's suburban rail fleet, replacing the ageing 1960s Tulloch double deck carriages and providing extra capacity on the suburban rail network. The sets currently operate on the T2 Leppington & Inner West, T3 Liverpool & Inner West, T5 Cumberland, T6 Lidcombe & Bankstown, T7 Olympic Park and T8 Airport & South lines.

== Design ==
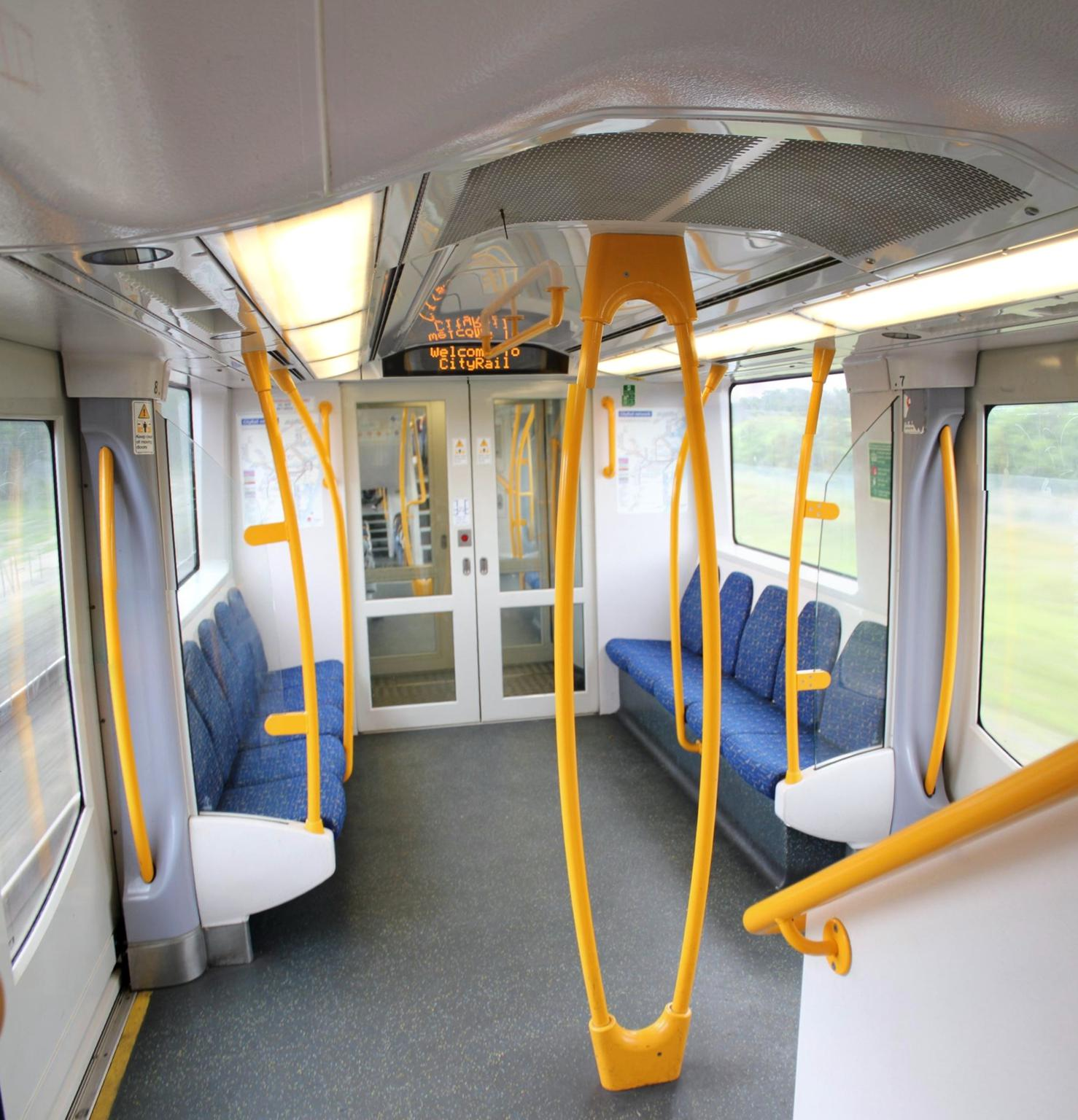
Vestibule

The Millennium train, just like the entire Sydney Trains fleet, is a double decker. It is a four car consist, with the middle two cars being non-control motor cars and the two outer cars being driving control trailer cars fitted with the pantograph. The Millennium train was the first to be equipped with an AC drive system unlike the Tangara, which has a DC drive system. The sets usually operate in eight-car formations with two four-car sets combined. While the Millennium train concept is an evolution of the Tangara concept (manufactured by A Goninan & Co), the Millennium train introduced new features such as internal electronic destination indicators, automated digital voice announcements for upcoming stops, a return to reversible seating, surveillance cameras, wider stairways, a new safety yellow colour scheme, and push-button opened internal doors. The Millennium Train also introduced crumple zones to absorb impact in a collision. Interiors were designed by Transport Design International.

The train also features emergency help points, allowing passengers to contact the train crew in an emergency. The help points are located on the sides of the stairwell to the upper deck. There are actually two help points in the same location, with a large one at face height with a microphone and speaker, and a lower one with a microphone only. There are also emergency door releases which were retrofitted to the trains. These allow passengers to manually open the doors in an emergency, as recommended in the report for the Waterfall rail accident. The retrofit program was stated as having been completed in November 2014.

Like with the T, A and B sets, the M sets feature Scharfenberg couplers.

M sets are 3.03 metres (9 ft 11 1/4 in) wide, being classed by Transport for NSW as medium-width trains, which allows them to operate within the whole Sydney Trains suburban network.

Unlike sets M2–M35, set M1 has a slightly different interior design with differently coloured doors and different seat handles likely due to M1 being the prototype M Set.

== Delivery ==
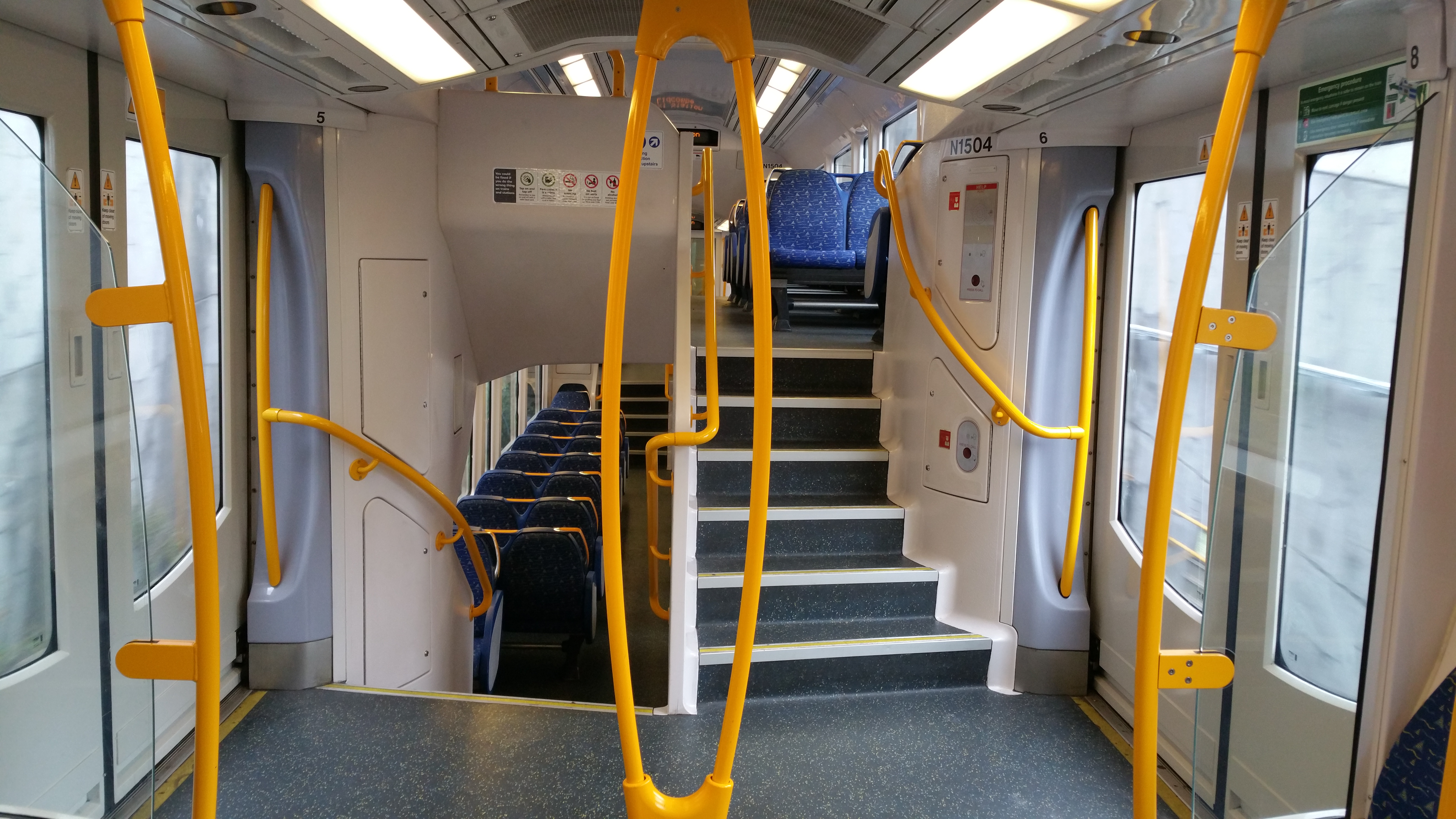
Stairwell

The cars were constructed by EDi Rail at Cardiff Workshops. The contract included a 15-year maintenance agreement with EDi Rail to maintain the trains at a specialised maintenance centre at Eveleigh. During testing and initial revenue service, they ran as four-car sets, with eight-car sets commencing service towards the end of 2002 after further testing. All 35 four-car sets were delivered by October 2005.

The initial order signed in October 1998 was for 81 carriages, in December 2002 an option was taken up for an additional 60. In February 2017, Sydney Trains exercised an option to extend Downer's maintenance of the trains for a further 10 years.

=== Criticisms ===
The Millennium trains were criticised for having several technical problems and causing problems with Sydney Trains; they were referred to in the media reports as The "Mi-lemon" and "Millenni-Bug" as a result. Some of the problems were caused by insufficient power supply on the overhead to cope with the power demands of the more technologically advanced trains causing them to shut down. Software bugs also contributed to the trains' poor reliability.

The Millennium trains were withdrawn from service in April 2003 while the problems were being rectified and a full audit was carried out. They were subsequently reintroduced into service in June 2003.

As of the new timetable since 20 October 2024, M Sets now run 8-car services on the T2 Leppington & Inner West, T3 Liverpool & Inner West, T5 Cumberland and T8 Airport & South lines, while also running 4-car services on T5 Cumberland, T6 Lidcombe & Bankstown and T7 Olympic Park lines.

== In service ==
=== External Carriage Camera Trial ===
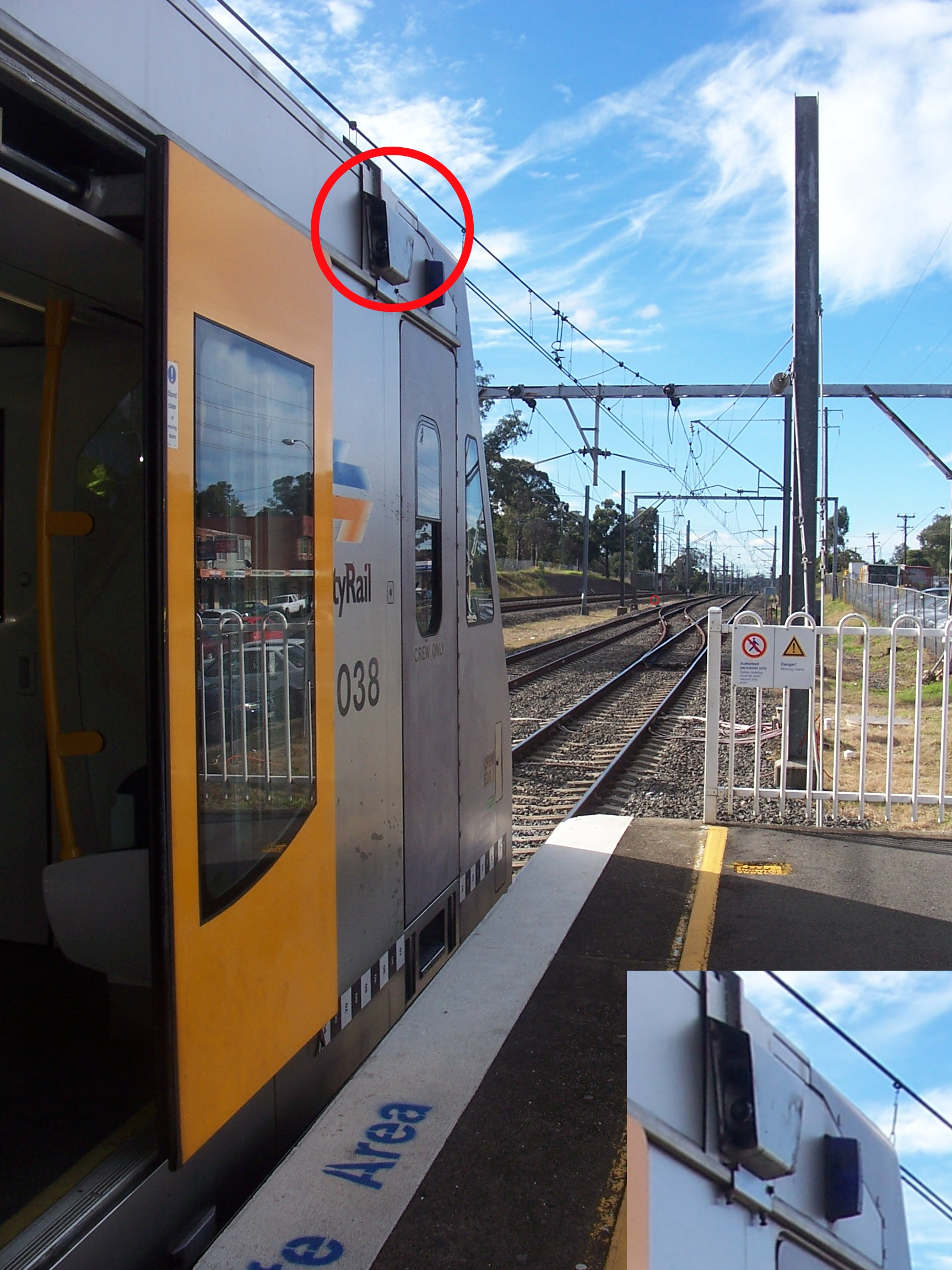
Trial cameras

In late 2008, two Millennium trains were fitted with external cameras atop of carriages near the doors, testing their use for the then-future Waratah trains. These cameras were subsequently incorporated into the final design of the Waratah train.

=== Lines serviced ===
The Millennium trains typically operate on the following lines (normally described as Sector 2):

- T2 Leppington & Inner West Line: Leppington or Parramatta to City Circle via Granville (Weekdays)
- T3 Liverpool & Inner West Line: Liverpool to City Circle via Regents Park and Lidcombe (Weekdays)
- T5 Cumberland Line: Schofields to Leppington or Blacktown to Liverpool (Weekdays)
- T6 Lidcombe & Bankstown Line: Bankstown to Lidcombe
- T7 Olympic Park Line: Shuttle from Lidcombe to Olympic Park (Weekdays)
- T8 Airport & South Line: Macarthur to City Circle via Airport or Sydenham (Weekdays)

=== Maintenance Depots ===
The trains were originally maintained at Eveleigh Maintenance Centre, they are now maintained at Auburn Maintenance Centre.

As with all other trains, these trains are not exclusively kept in Auburn overnight. They only need to return to the depot for maintenance, and at other times, they may be stabled at various yards on the lines that they operate, such as Blacktown, Liverpool and Rossmore yards.
