= Millennium Tower =

Millennium Tower may refer to:

- Millennium Tower (Abuja), Nigeria
- Millennium Tower (Amsterdam), Netherlands
- Millennium Tower (Belgrade), Serbia
- Millennium Tower (Boston), United States
- Millennium Tower (Dubai), United Arab Emirates
- Millennium Tower (Frankfurt), Germany
- Millennium Tower (Gedinne), Belgium
- Millennium Tower (London), England
- Millennium Tower (Magdeburg), Germany (Jahrtausendturm)
- Millennium Tower (New York City), United States
- Millennium Tower (Penang), Malaysia
- Millennium Tower (Rotterdam), Netherlands
- Millennium Tower (San Francisco), United States
- Millennium Tower (Tokyo), Japan
- Millennium Tower (Vienna), Austria

== See also ==
- Millennium Point (disambiguation)
