= Millennium (video game series) =

- Genre: Role-playing video game
- Developer: Aldorlea Games
- Publisher: Aldorlea Games
- Creator: Indinera Falls
- First release: Millennium - A New Hope; September 21st, 2009
- Latest release: Millennium 5 - The Battle of the Millennium; July 21st, 2013

Millennium is a Japanese-style role-playing video game series by Aldorlea Games. It is set in a fantasy medieval world where players take control of a young peasant girl named Marine. Several other characters join her later in the game and in the sequels. There are five games in the series. All the games in the series were made with RPG Maker XP and are designed so they can either be played as stand-alone or importing savefiles from one game to another.

== Gameplay ==
The series's gameplay and visuals are similar to 2D role-playing video games like the classic Final Fantasy and Dragon Quest games. The Gamesmen hailed it as a "software worthy of Genesis and Super Nintendo era gaming." It features mouse control, difficulty choice, visible or invisible monsters, in-game tutorial, and numerous sidequests. Each game can be downloaded individually, but save games can be transferred from one game to the next, allowing players to keep their inventory.

== Plot ==
Millennium takes place in the world of Myst, divided between the rich people living in the town of Mystrock, and the poor people pushed away in the murky areas of the countryside. Marine, a daring teenager whose father is critically injured, embarks on a journey to gather 12 warriors and enter a showdown that determines the next ruler of Mystrock.

== Series ==
There are five episodes in the series. Millennium 5 is the final episode.

- Millennium: A New Hope (2009-09-21)
- Millennium 2: Take Me Higher (2009-12-20)
- Millennium 3: Cry Wolf (2010-10-31)
- Millennium 4: Beyond Sunset (2011-08-06)
- Millennium 5: The Battle of the Millennium (2013-07-21)

Big Fish Games localized the game for Germany and France.

== Reception ==
Millennium: A New Hope was given an 89 out of 100 review by RPGFan's Neal Chandran, who opined "the art is gorgeous, the music is great, the gameplay is fun, and the characters make me want to journey with them." It was awarded Indie RPG of the Year by RPG Fan. A New Hope was given a 3 out of 5 stars review by Erin Bell of Gamezebo, who noted "Millennium's healthy number of secrets and side quests give it a nice amount of depth, with a style of gameplay that rewards people who are thorough and curious." It was given an 84 out of 100 review by The Gamesmen, with the review stating, "There is a good amount of content here to be had and it could easily be featured as a WiiWare title in the vein of Final Fantasy IV: The After Years".
