= Millennium Park (disambiguation) =

Millennium Park is a park in Chicago, Illinois.

Millennium Park may also refer to:

- Millennium Park (Calgary), Canada
- Millennium Park (Kolkata), India
- Millennium Park (Abuja), Nigeria
- Millennium Park (Grand Rapids), a park in Grand Rapids, Michigan, U.S.
- Millennium Park (Manhattan), a park in New York City
- Millennium Park (Kazan), a park in Kazan, Russia
- Millennium Park (Boston), a park in Boston, Massachusetts
