= Millenium (Polish band) =

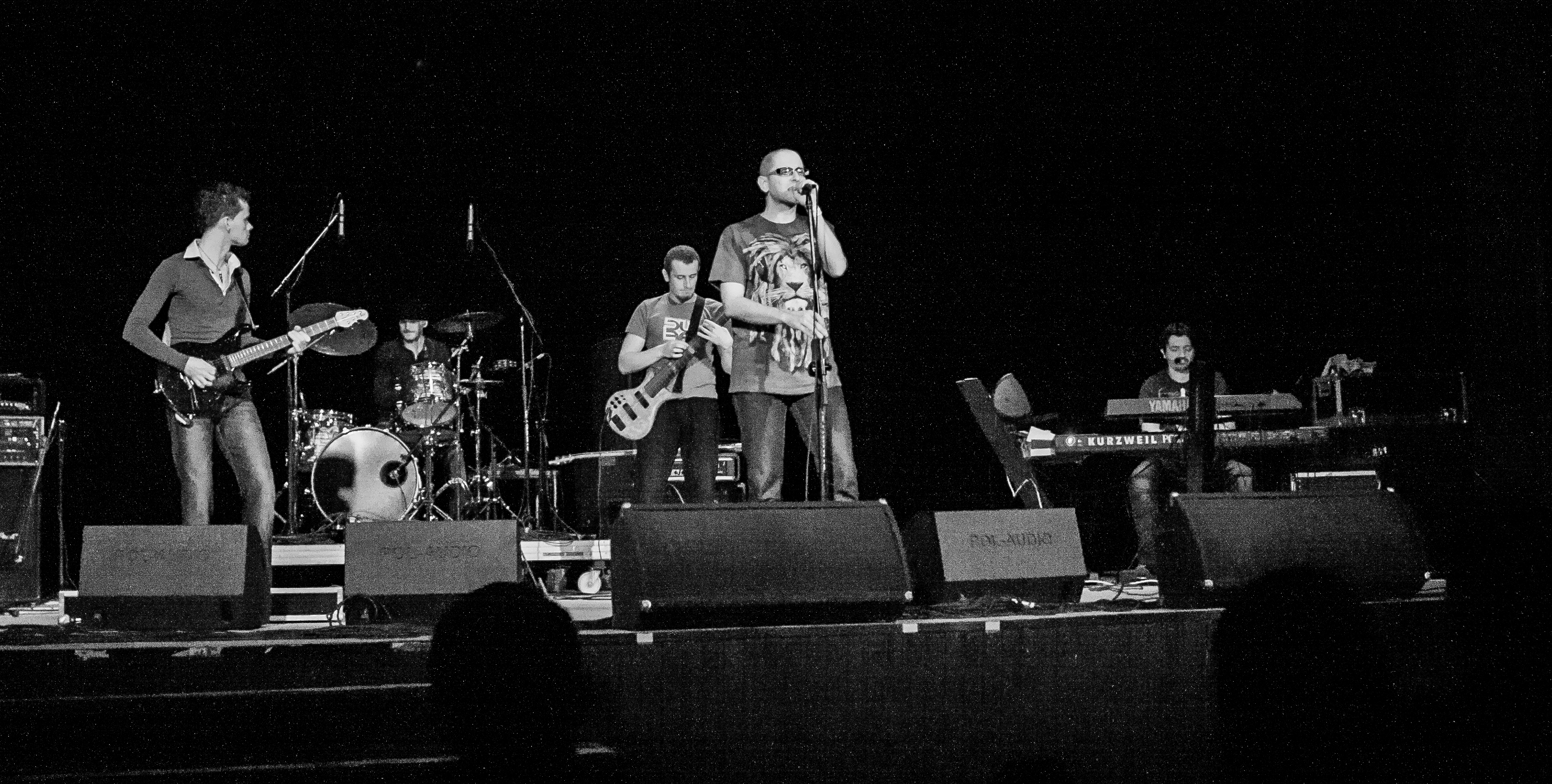
- Millenium playing on the progressive rock stage at ACK Electric Nights Festival in Lublin on November 12, 2010

Background information
- Years active: 1999–present
- Website: http://www.millenium.art.pl/

Millenium is a progressive rock group formed in Poland in 1999, led by Ryszard Kramarski.

== Line-up ==
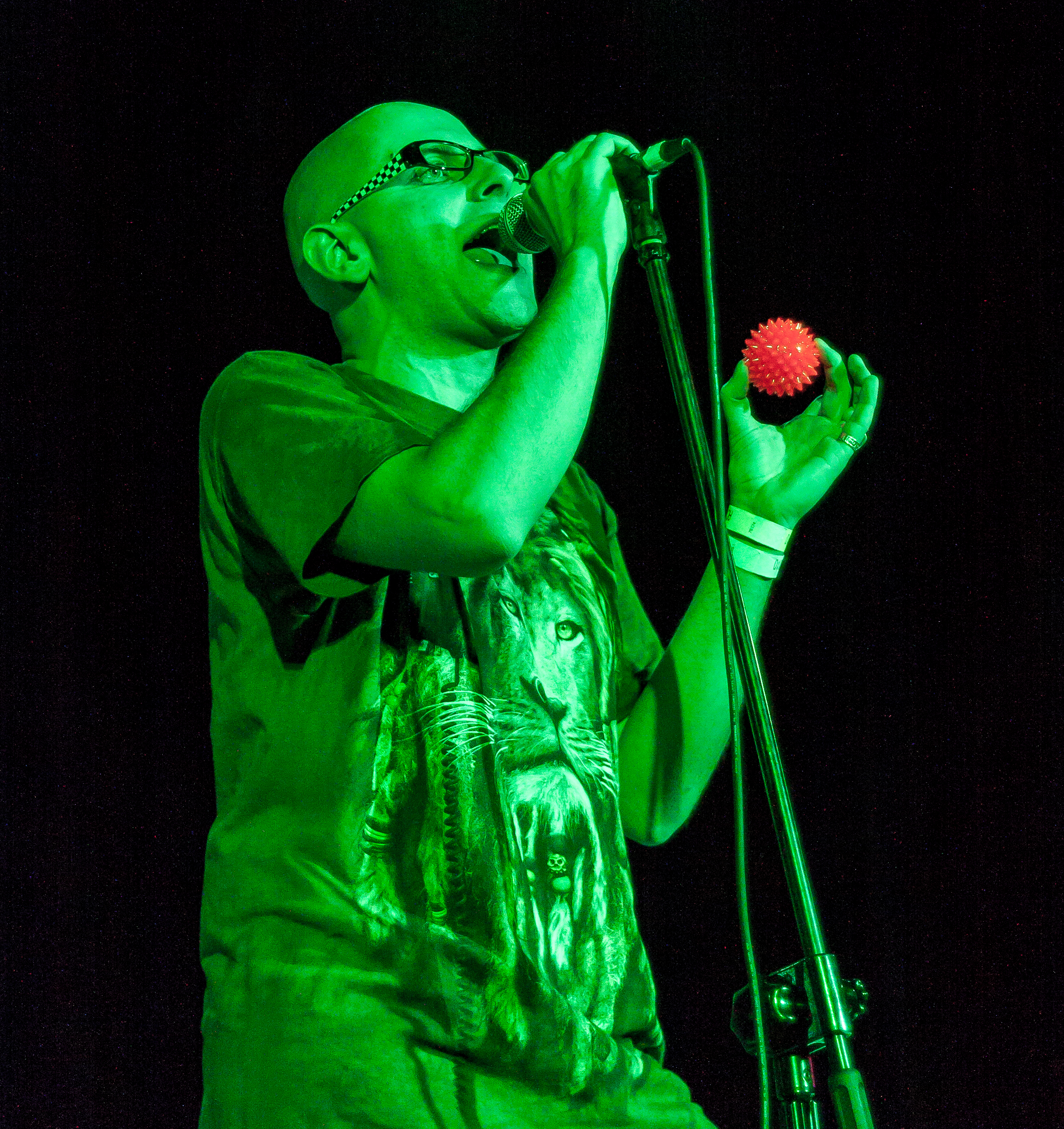
Łukasz Gall

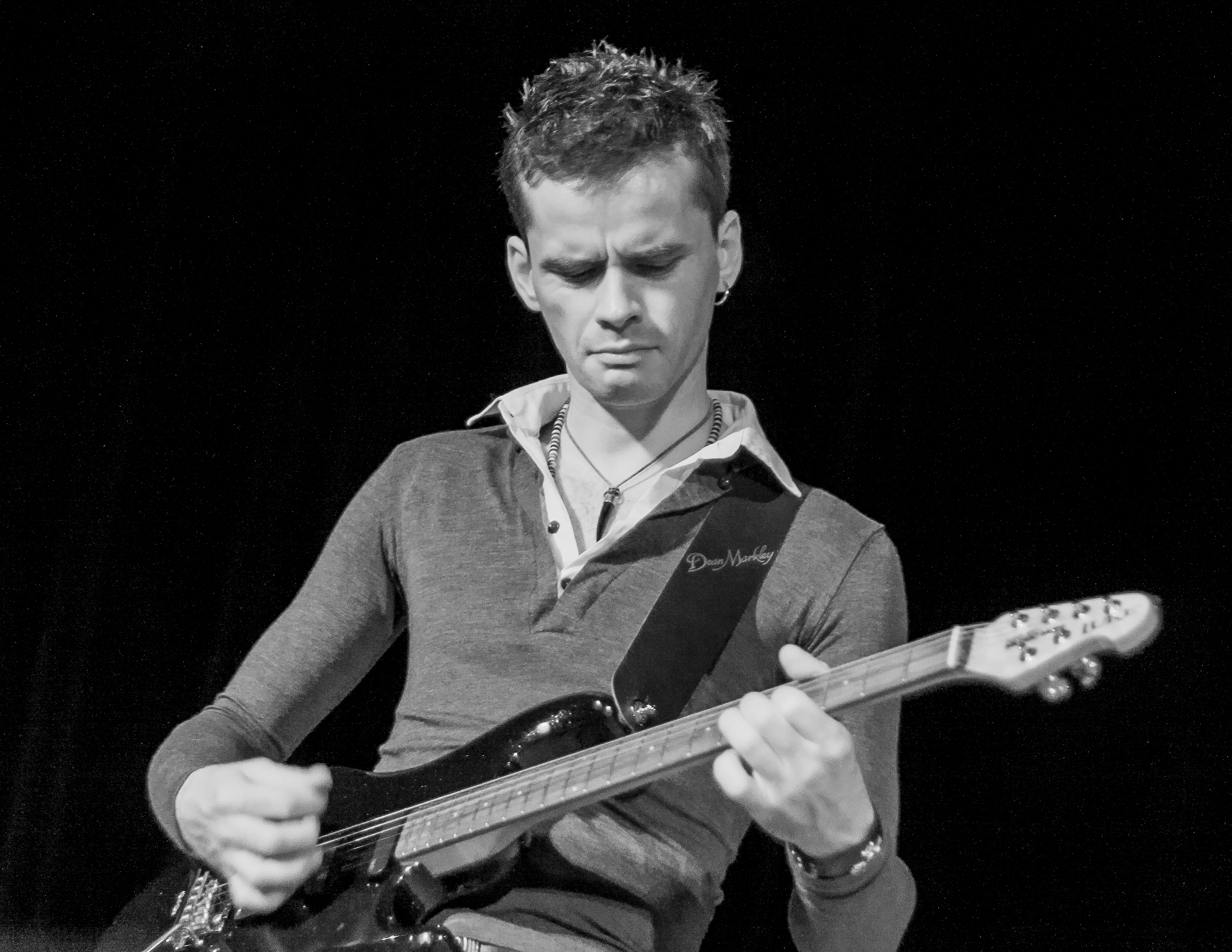
Piotr Płonka

=== Current members ===
- Dawid Lewandowski – vocals
- Piotr Płonka – guitar
- Krzysztof Wyrwa – bass guitar, Chapman Stick
- Ryszard Kramarski – keyboards, guitar
- Grzegorz Bauer – drums, percussion

=== Former members ===
- Piotr Mazurkiewicz – bass guitar
- Tomasz Pabian – guitar
- Przemysław Drużkowski – guitar
- Marcin Błaszak
- Łukasz Gałęziowski "Gall" – vocals
- Tomasz Paśko – percussion

== Discography ==
Based on the official group website. Millenium has released 23 albums, live concert recordings and compilations included.

=== Albums ===
- 1999 – Millenium
- 2000 – Vocanda
- 2002 – Reincarnations
- 2004 – Deja Vu
- 2005 – Interdead
- 2006 – Numbers and Big Dreams of Mr Sunders
- 2007 – 7 Years: Novelties, rarities ... & the best (2CD)
- 2008 – Three Brothers' Epilogue (EP)
- 2008 – Exist
- 2010 – Back After Years Live in Krakow 2009 (2CD & DVD; live album)
- 2011 – Puzzles
- 2011 – White Crow (compilation)
- 2013 – Ego
- 2013 – Vocanda 2013 Live in Studio
- 2014 – In Search of the Perfect Melody
- 2017 – 44 Minutes
- 2018 – MMXVIII
- 2019 – The Web
- 2020 – Forgotten Songs (RSD 2020 Release – vinyl only)
- 2020 – Rarities (Compilation)
- 2020 – The Sin
- 2022 – Tales From Imaginary Movies
- 2022 – Something Ends, Something Begins (The best of... 2CD)
- 2024 – Hope Dies Last
- 2025 – The lost melodies

=== Singles ===
- 1999 – Ekopieśń
- 1999 – Był Sobie Kraj
- 2000 – Lady Cash Casch
- 2002 – Cygara Smak
- 2004 – The Silent Hill
- 2005 – Demon
- 2006 – Numbers...
- 2007 – 7 years
