= Millennium Bank =

Millennium Bank may refer to:

- Banco Comercial Português, a Portuguese bank that was founded in 1985, operating as Millennium BCP
  - Bank Millennium, a subsidiary based in Poland
  - Millennium Bank (Greece), a bank in Greece
  - Millennium bim, the largest bank in Mozambique
  - Banco Millennium Atlântico, a bank in Angola
- Millennium Seed Bank Partnership, an international conservation project
