= Millennium High School =

Millennium High School may refer to:

- Millennium High School (Arizona), US
- Millennium High School (California), US
- Millennium High School (New York City), US

== See also ==
- Millennium Art Academy, Bronx, New York, US
