= Millennium Science Initiative =

The Millennium Science Initiative, a project of The World Bank and the Science Initiative Group, is an international initiative to build capacity in science and technology in the developing world. Inaugurated in Chile in 1998, the Millennium Science Initiative now has a major presence in Chile, Brazil, and Uganda, and also is active on a smaller scale in a number of countries in sub-Saharan Africa. Highly adaptable to circumstances, the initiative achieves its mission through a variety of vehicles, among them competitively chosen centers or networks of excellence in scientific research and training.

== History ==
The Millennium Science Initiative came into being over the course of several years, building on the rich history of previous attempts to build S&T capacity in the developing world. These attempts have included programs of The Academy of Science for the Developing World, UNESCO, International Council for Science (ICSU), the European Union, private foundations, Scandinavian aid organizations, and The World Bank.

The specific concept for the Millennium Science Initiative represents the confluence of two initiatives. First, in 1997, then World Bank president James Wolfensohn was exploring ways in which the Bank might incorporate science and technology into its development strategy. Mr. Wolfensohn, who also chaired the Board of Trustees of the Institute for Advanced Study in Princeton, New Jersey, sought the advice of the Institute Director at the time, Phillip Griffiths.

Meanwhile, the leaders of some of South America's Mercosur countries – Presidents Frei of Chile, Cardoso of Brazil, and Menem of Argentina – discussed their desire to build S&T capacity at a summit meeting in the fall of 1997. Each president was approaching the end of his term, and they all agreed that they would try to leave as a legacy of their terms the basis for strengthened scientific capacity in their countries and the broader Southern Cone region. The Science Advisor to the President of Chile was, by coincidence, a part-time Member of the Institute for Advanced Study in Princeton. He approached Dr. Griffiths to discuss ways in which his president's objective might be realized.

These approaches came together in a major convocation in Santiago, Chile, in 1998, supported by the Government of Chile and the Carnegie Corporation of New York, where the basis for the Millennium Science Initiative was formulated by an international panel of leading scientists, government officials, representatives of the private sector, and World Bank officials. The first concrete result was the implementation in Chile.

The Science Initiative Group was established in 1999 to ensure adequate representation of the international scientific community in the Millennium Science Initiative, to provide scientific guidance, and to coordinate the efforts of the many groups whose participation is essential for successful program implementation.

== Chile ==
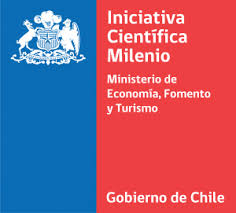
The Millennium Science Initiative's official logo

In Chile, the Iniciativa Científica Milenio is a governmental program run by the Ministry of Economy, Development and Tourism. Funding is provided for institutes and programs in both the natural sciences and social sciences.

Natural-science institutes

- Instituto Milenio Centro Interdisciplinario de Neurociencia Valparaíso
- Instituto Milenio de Ecología y Biodiversidad
- Instituto Milenio de Neurociencia Biomédica
- Instituto Milenio de Astrofísica
- Instituto Milenio de Inmunología e Inmunoterapia
- Instituto Milenio de Oceanografía
- Instituto Milenio Sistemas Complejos de Ingeniería
- Instituto Milenio Fundamentos de los Datos

Social-science institutes

- Instituto Milenio para la Investigación en Depresión y Personalidad
- Instituto Milenio para la investigación en Imperfecciones de Mercado y Políticas Públicas

Natural-science nuclei

- Núcleo Milenio Biología de Enfermedades Neuropsiquiátricas
- Núcleo Milenio de Conservación Marina
- Núcleo Milenio Centro de Investigación de la Web Semántica
- Núcleo Milenio Centro Interdisciplinario de Líquidos Iónicos
- Núcleo Milenio Centro para el Estudio de Forzantes Múltiples sobre Sistemas Socio-Ecológicos
- Núcleo Milenio de Biología Fúngica Integrativa y Sintética
- Núcleo Milenio de Ecología y Manejo Sustentable de Islas Oceánicas
- Núcleo Milenio de Física Matemática
- Núcleo Milenio Discos protoplanetarios en ALMA Early Science
- Núcleo Milenio en Biología Regenerativa
- Núcleo Milenio en Biología Sintética y Biología de Sistemas Vegetales
- Núcleo Milenio en Ecología Molecular y Aplicaciones Evolutivas en Agroecosistemas
- Núcleo Milenio Información y Coordinación en Redes
- Núcleo Milenio Ingeniería Molecular para Catalisis y Biosensores
- Núcleo Milenio Modelos Estocásticos de Sistemas Complejos y Desordenados
- Núcleo Milenio Óptica Avanzada
- Núcleo Milenio Paleoclima del Hemisferio Sur
- Núcleo Milenio para el Análisis de Ecuaciones en Derivadas Parciales
- Núcleo Milenio Procesos Químicos y Catálisis
- Núcleo Milenio Trazadores de Metales en Zonas de Subducción

Social-science nuclei

- Núcleo de Investigación en Economía Ambiental y Recursos Naturales
- Núcleo Milenio Centro para el Impacto Socioeconómico de las Políticas Ambientales
- Núcleo Milenio de Estrategia de Emprendimiento bajo incertidumbre
- Núcleo Milenio de Investigación sobre Energía y Sociedad
- Núcleo Milenio Modelo de Crisis: el caso de Chile
- Núcleo Milenio para el Estudio de la Estatalidad y la Democracia en América Latina
- Núcleo Milenio Desafíos a la Representación
