= Millennium Institute (Hungarian think tank) =

The Millennium Institute (Millennium Intézet) is a Hungarian think tank.

It is known for its series of lectures, Várostudás Kollégiuma (College for the Knowledge on the City), which is about urban planning and development.
