= 1,000 Years =

Studio album by the Corin Tucker Band
- Released: October 5, 2010
- Recorded: Little Golden Book Studio, Portland, OR, early 2010
- Genres: Alternative rock, indie rock
- Length: 40:50
- Label: Kill Rock Stars
- Producer: Seth Lorinczi

The Corin Tucker Band chronology
1,000 Years (2010)	Kill My Blues (2012)

Singles from 1,000 Years
- 1. "Doubt" Released: September 7, 2010

1,000 Years is the first album by the Corin Tucker Band, released on October 5, 2010, and the first album Corin Tucker released since Sleater-Kinney went on "hiatus" in 2006. She recorded the album along with Seth Lorinczi and Julianna Bright of both Golden Bears and Circus Lupus, as well as Sara Lund of Hungry Ghost and Unwound. Lorinzci was also the album's producer. The only single released from 1,000 Years was "Doubt".

The album received generally positive reviews from critics, many of whom noted that the album was stylistically much more muted and intimate than her work with Sleater-Kinney. As of August 2012, the album has sold about 8,000 copies. It peaked at No. 9 on the Top Heatseekers Chart, and at No. 49 on the Top Independent Albums Chart, both on October 23, 2010.

== Background and recording ==
Tucker told The Portland Mercury that she was recording the album in April 2010, and said it was "definitely more of a middle-aged mom record, in a way. It's not a record that a young person would write." The origins of these songs lie in material Tucker wrote for live performances in early 2009 in Portland, after which many people encouraged her to make her own album. Tucker said that she wanted to create something both quiet and powerful in the making of this album. Tucker feels that Seth Lorinczi lent the album many of its creative ideas, and has stated, "He brought so many amazing ideas to the songs, it was an entirely new foray." Some of the album's tracks were written initially for the Twilight: New Moon soundtrack. The songs in question include closer "Miles Away".

== Production ==
Some critics described Seth Lorinczi's production on 1,000 Years as lo-fi, with Slant noting a lack of refinement in the production, especially on "Doubt" and "Dragon". Tucker, in an interview with The Aquarian Weekly, wrote that Lorinzci's approach to production was to "make each song complete sonically," adding that, in her new project, she was trying to build on her past role as a member of Sleater-Kinney.

== Composition ==
=== Music ===
Tucker said that her influences for this album included The Lion and the Cobra, as well as The Slits, The Raincoats, and The English Beat. She also named Patti Smith, Chrissie Hynde and Sinéad O'Connor as influences in an interview with PopMatters. Tucker's singing on the album is much more subdued and intimate than it was on her work with Sleater-Kinney, when her voice was distinctive for its strong, surging sound. However, she occasionally returns to the full force of her "banshee" voice for which she was previously well-known, for example on "Riley".

1,000 Years has been compared, both favorably and unfavorably, to Tucker's work with Sleater-Kinney, with the general conclusion being that the album's style differs significantly from that of Sleater-Kinney. For example, Pitchfork Media wrote that "fans jonesing for a Sleater-Kinney fix will be disappointed." Rolling Stone and Drowned in Sound noted the increased usage of piano and cello, among other instruments, on this album as opposed to in Sleater-Kinney's music. DiS singled out the organ on "Handed Love" as well as the military rhythm of "Half a World Away" as examples of this.

=== Lyrics ===
It has been noted that Tucker's marriage seems to have influenced the album's lyrics, in particular those of "Half a World Away" and "It's Always Summer". Regarding the album's lyrics, Ann Powers of the Los Angeles Times wrote that they discuss the process of coming to recognize changes in one's reality and surroundings.

== Tour ==
Tucker toured on both U.S. coasts to support 1,000 Years, in addition to dates in other parts of the country. Additionally, on May 3, 2011, Tucker opened for M. Ward at the Crystal Ballroom, in Portland, Oregon. In a Kill Rock Stars press release, Tucker stated that she was no longer able to tour for as long as she once could, and that "We're definitely playing shows, but it's more like a week here, a week there."

== Reception ==
Professional ratings
Aggregate scores
Source	Rating
Metacritic	76/100
Review scores
Source	Rating
AllMusic	3.5/5 stars
The A.V. Club	B
Drowned in Sound	8/10
Entertainment Weekly	C+
MSN Music (Expert Witness)	A
NME	4/5 stars
No Ripcord	8/10
Pitchfork	6.5/10
Rolling Stone	3.5/5 stars
Slant	3/5 stars

The album received mostly positive reviews; on Metacritic its weighted average is 76 out of 100, indicating "generally favorable reviews". The most positive review was from Robert Christgau, who gave it an A and called it "A deep, pained, sober, subtle album". In addition to giving the album an A, Christgau ranked 1,000 Years as the 11th best album of 2010 in his year-end list. This contrasted starkly with the most negative review, a C+ from EW's Whitney Pastorek, who said that, on the album,

Corin Tucker's voice – always so uniquely emotive in the punkier contexts of S-K – looms uncomfortably over songs that sound scrapbooked from other '90s-centric acts (Liz Phair, Pavement) but never take on a form of their own.

With regard to the album's only single "Doubt", Adam Kivel of Consequence of Sound praised the song on the basis that Tucker's characteristic "howl" made a return on the track. Similarly, Thom Gibbs of Drowned in Sound praised the song because it features Tucker in more familiar vocal form. Kivel also noted that the song was stripped down and lacked the same wild energy as Sleater-Kinney's music. Kivel also compared the sound of "Thrift Store Coats" to that of the Fiery Furnaces, and described "Dragon" as "dramatic" while noting that it was dominated by cello.

== Commercial performance ==
As of August 2012, 1,000 Years had sold about 8,000 copies.

== Track listing ==
1. "1,000 Years" – 3:47
2. "Half a World Away" – 3:02
3. "It's Always Summer" – 3:37
4. "Handed Love" – 3:17
5. "Doubt" – 3:23
6. "Dragon" – 3:56
7. "Riley" – 3:14
8. "Pulling Pieces" – 4:28
9. "Thrift Store Coats" – 2:52
10. "Big Goodbye" – 4:46
11. "Miles Away" – 4:34

== Chart positions ==
Chart (2010)	Peak position
Top Heatseekers	9
Top Independent Albums	49

== Personnel ==
- Julianna Bright – vocals
- Douglas Jenkins – cello
- Corin Tucker – composer, guitar (acoustic), guitar (electric), main personnel, primary artist, vocals
- Seth Lorinczi – bass, engineer, guitar (acoustic), guitar (electric), keyboards, main personnel, producer, string arrangements
- Sara Lund – drums, percussion
- Kate O'Brien-Clarke – violin
- Sung Kim – artwork
