= Mount Eerie (album) =

2003 folk album by the Microphones

Studio album by the Microphones
- Released: January 21, 2003
- Recorded: November 21, 2001 – June 10, 2002
- Studio: Dub Narcotic (Olympia, Washington)
- Genres: Psychedelic folk; experimental rock; experimental
- Length: 40:51
- Labels: K; P.W. Elverum & Sun, Ltd.; 7.e.p.(JP)
- Producer: Phil Elverum

The Microphones chronology
Little Bird Flies into a Big Black Cloud (2002)	Mount Eerie (2003)	Microphones in 2020 (2020)

Mount Eerie is the fourth studio album by American indie folk and indie rock band the Microphones, released by K Records on January 21, 2003. The album is named after the mountain Mount Erie near Anacortes, Washington, which is the hometown of Phil Elverum, the band's frontman. The album received generally positive reviews from critics, including accolades such as Pitchfork's "Best New Music" title and inclusion on Treblezine's list of "essential" psychedelic folk albums.

Mount Eerie has been described by Elverum as being about mountains, earth and space. The album is a concept album, consisting of a linear narrative spanning its five songs. Elverum establishes a metaphor for life in which he depicts the womb, birth, and through to death, in the second-last track. His lyrics depict a cast of characters, while the music includes cinematic drums, choirs and drones. Sonically, the album is a continuation of The Glow Pt. 2 (2001), the previous studio album by the Microphones.

After the release of Mount Eerie, Elverum adopted the Mount Eerie moniker, as the themes of his music had changed. The album was released alongside 2 EPs, The Singing from Mount Eerie and The Drums from Mount Eerie, featuring isolated tracks from the album. After its release, Elverum felt that the ending of Mount Eerie's narrative was inconclusive, leading him to release the sequel Mount Eerie pts. 6 & 7 in 2007.

== Recording and background ==
Pictured: A section of the chart Elverum used to plan out "I. The Sun".

Mount Eerie was named after the mountain Mount Erie near Anacortes, Washington. Elverum explained: "from where I grew up, the south side, [the mountain] has a pretty dramatic rock face, and so it was always looming there, especially from where I caught the school bus".

Mount Eerie was recorded between November 21, 2001, and June 10, 2002, at Dub Narcotic Studios in Olympia, Washington. 2 sections of the album, labelled "Big Black Death" and "Wind / Vultures" are solely attributed to Kyle Field and Karl Blau respectively. "Wind / Vultures" was recorded at Quatro-Syncho in Trafton Lake, Washington. Elverum describes Mount Eerie as "a continuation of the sound that concludes The Glow Pt. 2", the Microphones' previous studio album. "I. The Sun" was sonically tied to the closer of The Glow Pt. 2, "My Warm Blood", using the foghorn tape sound that concludes "My Warm Blood".

Elverum used different vocalists to represent different characters because he wanted the album to be more ambiguous and theatrical. He wanted these characters to "feel and seem different". Elverum conceived the first lines for "I. The Sun" during a six-week American tour between November and October 2001. While touring Florida, the presence of the sun, and the state's "menacing" atmosphere led him to writing the chorus of the song. "I. The Sun" was heavily inspired by the soundtrack of Brazilian film Black Orpheus (1959).

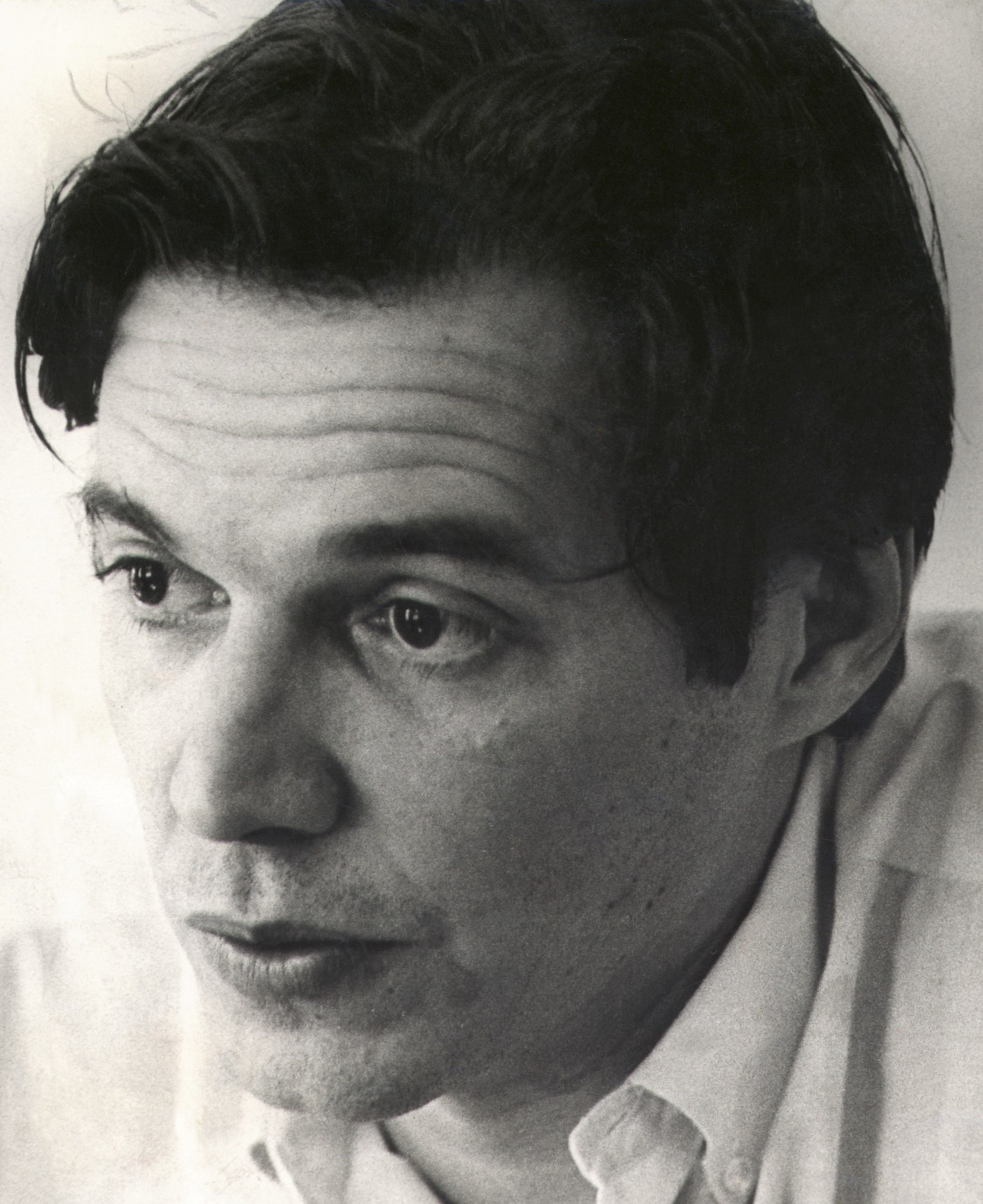
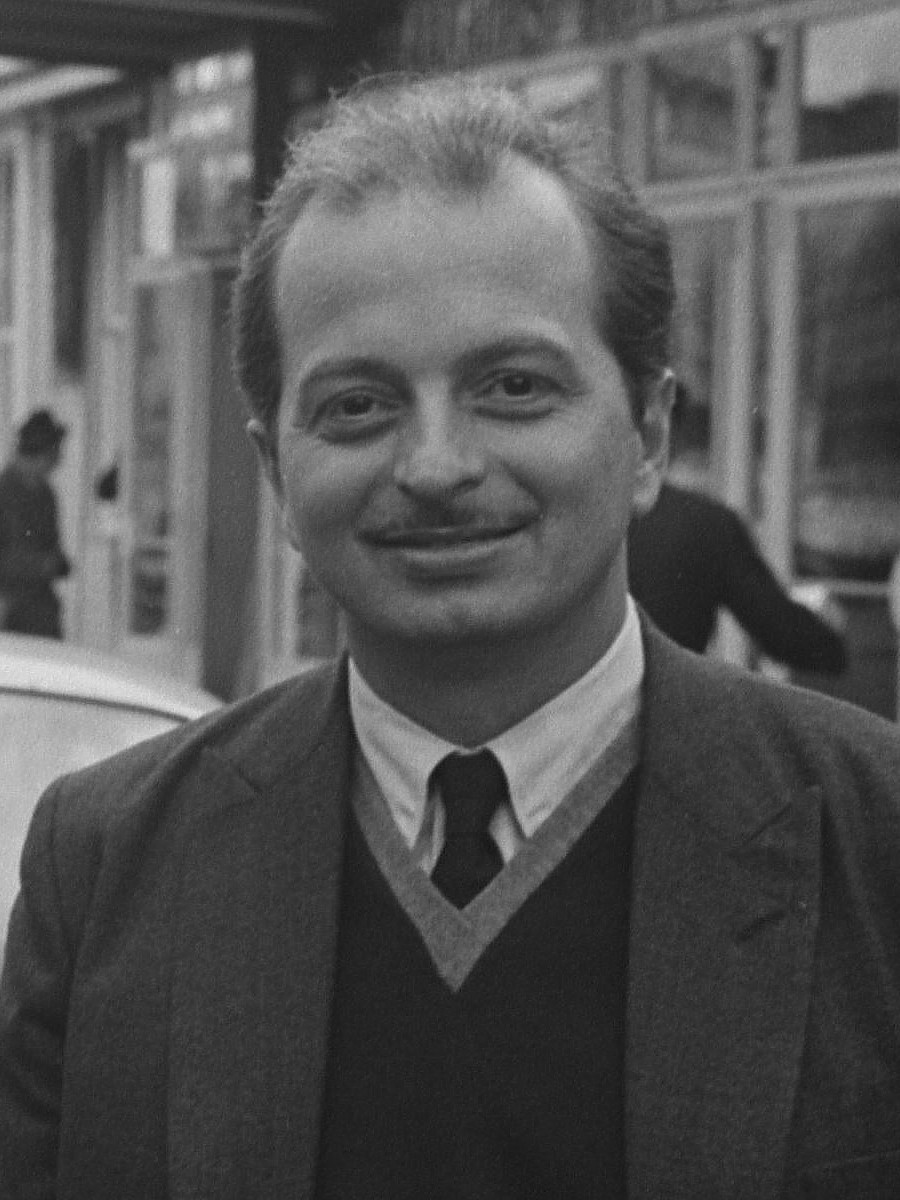
"I. The Sun" was inspired by Black Orpheus's soundtrack, written by Antônio Carlos Jobim (left) and Luiz Bonfá (right).

The vocal melody for "II. Solar System" was taken from "Fall Flood" by Little Wings. Elverum used the melody due to it being stuck in his head, and noted "our friendship during that time was very freely giving and taking from each other’s ideas and notebooks." Elverum notes about "III: Universe", "the way I recorded the drums was just like, 'Well let’s see what the mic is like if it’s recorded here." Calvin Johnson was cast as the voice of the Universe due to his deep, taunting and booming voice, with Elverum stating "it could only be him I think."

For the choir of "IV: Mount Eerie", Elverum put up posters in Olympia, Washington, asking for singers. He recorded eight singers. In the section labelled "Big Black Death", referred to by Elverum as "Kyle's rap", Kyle Field wrote and sang the lyrics for the personification of death. A line from the section, “Do you see what happens?” is a reference to the 1998 film The Big Lebowski. Elverum attempted to write down all of his ideas for the album prior to recording the album. He created a chart of elements outlining what later became "I. The Sun" and the start of "II. Solar System". Another chart was used to map out the complex drum rhythms on parts of "I. The Sun". A further two charts were used to plan out the harmonies and track recordings for "III. Universe", and another with rough lyrics from "V. Universe". Some lyrics from the album were inspired or directly taken from lines in Elverum's journals, which date to late 2001.

== Music and themes ==
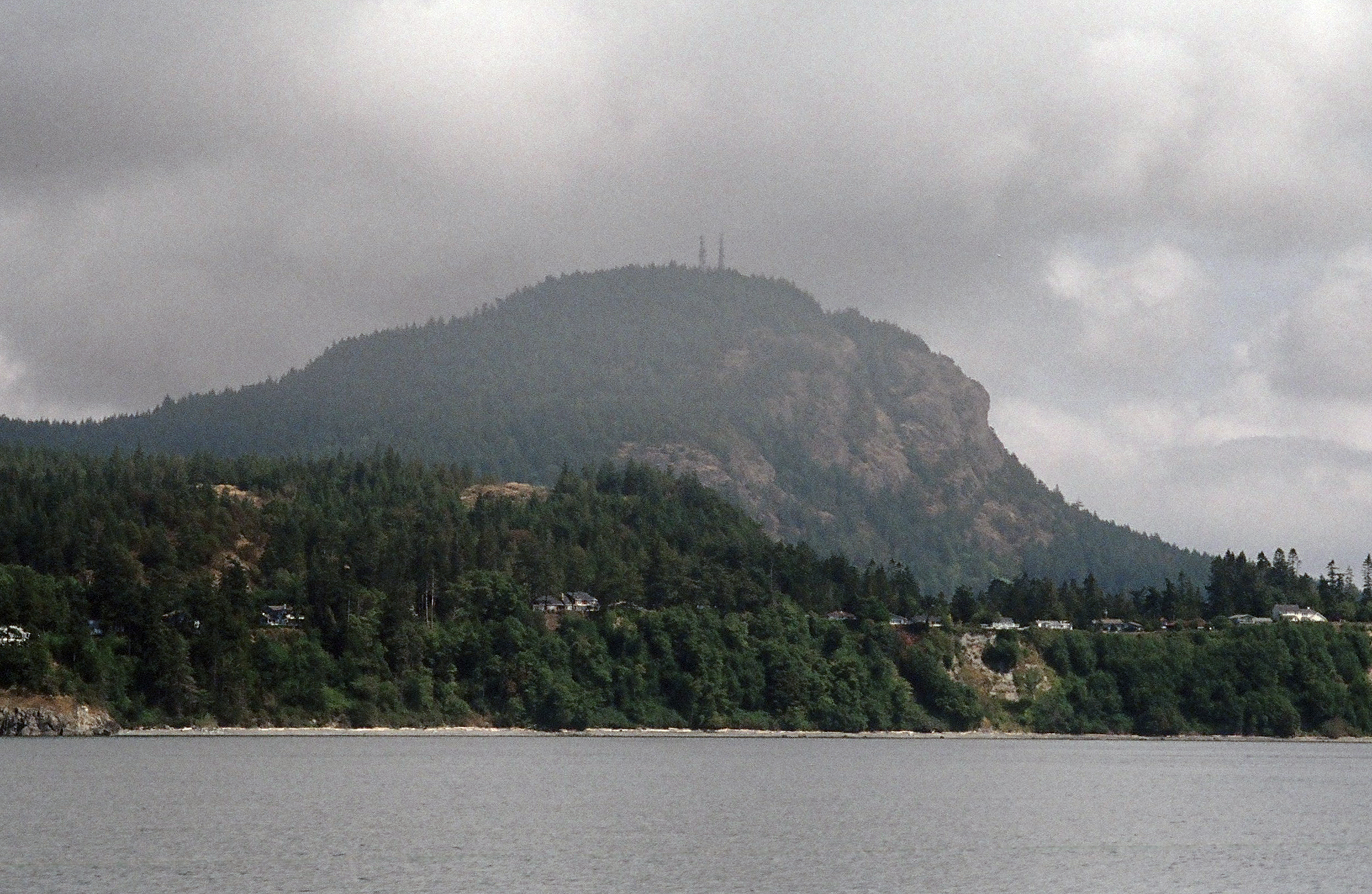
Pictured: Mount Erie, which provides the album's name and the setting of its narrative.

Mount Eerie is a concept album, portraying a linear storyline with distinct characters. It has been described as psychedelic folk, experimental rock, and experimental music. The lyrics heavily focus on nature and the universe, and ultimately, death. Mount Eerie represents rock in a trilogy of albums based on nature, with It Was Hot, We Stayed In The Water (2000) representing water and The Glow Pt. 2 (2001) representing fire. In the album, Elverum (Note: For the purposes of this section, "Elverum" refers to Phil Elverum, the musician; while "Phil" refers to the character Phil from the album, who attempts to climb Mount Eerie.) tells of a fictitious climb up Mount Erie, Washington (stylized as Mount Eerie in the album), passing by obstacles along the way. Adam Dlugacz of PopMatters interpreted that Elverum uses the climb of Mount Eerie as metaphor for life after continuously seeing the mountain while growing up in Anacortes, Washington.

The album begins with "I. The Sun", a 17-minute long track. Eric Carr of Pitchfork described the drums as a "heart-like pulse"; they gradually build up and become more complex. The drums sweep across the stereo channels, which Carr describes as "evoking either the rising and setting of our star, or the revolution of Earth". According to Elverum, the track's first five minutes represent time in the womb, and that the section until 10:42 spans the first 24 years of life. Far into the song, vocals enter, sounding desolate and vulnerable. Once vocals enter and Phil is born, he is forcibly chased up the mountain, by a personification of Death riding on a black ship. As the song finishes, it is consumed by a wall of distortion, which Carr describes as "a deafening drone and crash of cymbals".

In "II. Solar System", Phil continues his climb. The wall of noise from the previous track is cut back into an acoustic strum, described by Carr as "delicate". The lyrics have been interpreted as a self-reflection in nature, or as isolation and worry.

"I liked that idea also of this album not being a regular album where it’s just like the voice of one writer or a band or something. I wanted it to be ambiguous what’s going on here. Like, “What is this, a compilation? Who’s this singing now? And why does it sound totally different?” I wanted it to be confusing in that way. And also in a theatrical way. I wanted characters to feel and seem different.".

— Phil Elverum, in an interview with Life of the Record

On "III. Universe", different voices are prominently used to represent different characters. According to the liner notes written by Elverum, Headwaters, when Phil begins a sentence with "see me" he is speaking to the sun. This lyrical scheme is used in the first lines of "III. Universe" and in "I. The Sun". He explained, "[The 'Phil' character] says 'see me' do this and that because the sun does see it all, impartially." The track ends with a massive choir acting as the voice of the cosmos.

The title track, "IV. Mt. Eerie" acts as a climax for the album. In the start, Phil sees Death approaching, or as now fully named, the Big Black Death. Soon, Death arrives, voiced by Kyle Field. Carr describes Death's arrival as containing a "primal, percussive bloodlust". Soon, accompanying vultures appear. They rip apart Phil's flesh and he dies, signaling the end of the track.

"V. Universe" has been described as an apprehension and reflection following death. Phil obtains a greater understanding of the universe and feels his size within it. As the lyrics portray, "But Universe, I see your face / Looks just like mine / And we are open wide". A "ghostly chorus" – similar to the one used on "III. Universe" – is present, along with a "titanic bass drum". With that, Phil's journey ends.

== Release ==
The cover of the CD version of Mount Eerie.

After recording finished for Mount Eerie, Elverum moved out of his house in Olympia, Washington, went on tour, and spent a winter in Norway, writing material for Dawn (2008). After coming back, he released Mount Eerie and moved back to Anacortes, Washington, before deciding to adopt the Mount Eerie moniker. Elverum explained the name change: "when I first started recording music, I was actually singing about microphones, equipment, recording. But it had been awhile since I had done that, and I'd started singing about these weird, dark, natural themes."

Mount Eerie was released in Japan with an extended track list on December 12, 2002, under 7.e.p. On January 21, 2003, the album received its American release via K Records. Alongside the main album, two EPs, titled The Singing from Mount Eerie and The Drums from Mount Eerie were released. They feature isolated vocal and drum tracks respectively; P.W. Elverum & Sun's website noted the tracks are "intended for sampling, but not really".

After its release, Elverum felt the album was unfinished, inconclusive, and ambiguous. A 6th track, "The Universe (Conclusion)" was kept off the album due to indecision, although was included on the Japanese release of the album. He created a sequel in 2007, Mount Eerie pts. 6 & 7. After receiving permission from K Records, Elverum decided to repress 5 Microphones records, including Mount Eerie. Elverum explained they were "out of print for too long". The album was repressed on August 20, 2013, by Elverum's label, P.W. Elverum & Sun.

== Reception ==
Professional ratings
Aggregate scores
Source	Rating
Metacritic	76/100
Review scores
Source	Rating
AllMusic	4/5 stars
Alternative Press	5/5
Pitchfork	8.9/10
Stylus Magazine	B
Tiny Mix Tapes	5/5

Mount Eerie received generally positive reviews from critics, receiving a 76/100 on review aggregate Metacritic. On its release, Eric Carr of Pitchfork gave the album the publication's "Best New Music" title, and scored it an 8.9/10. Lavina Lee of Flak Magazine called the album "a complete tragedy. Or a comedy." and criticized it for being overambitious, having "croaking" singing, and a presumptuous release. Heather Phares of Allmusic described Mount Eerie as "deeply beautiful and unnerving, as well as deeply thoughtful". In a review for PopMatters, Adam Dlugacz gave the album a positive review, especially noting that "it is in the details that Phil Elvrum's latest opus unfolds". Stylus Magazine's Ed Howard wrote that Mount Eerie makes listeners "get to travel with him [Elverum] into the uncharted next ocean of Microphones territory." A guest writer of Tiny Mix Tapes, who gave the album a perfect score, felt that "Elvrum on record is the same Elvrum in reality", and that "it's nice to know that Elvrum is lucid on both sides."

In 2019, the album was included on Treblezine's list of "essential" psychedelic folk albums. In 2020, Bandcamp Daily called the album "Elverum's most elemental but complex album" and highlighted the album's seamless transitions between genres.

== Track listing ==
Mount Eerie
No.	Title	Length
1.	"I. The Sun"	17:11
2.	"II. Solar System"	3:38
3.	"III. Universe"	6:41
4.	"IV. Mt. Eerie"	8:58
5.	"V. Universe"	4:23
Total length:		40:51

Mount Eerie (Japanese 2002 Release)
No.	Title	Length
1.	"The Sun"	17:11
2.	"Solar System"	3:38
3.	"Universe"	6:41
4.	"Mount Eerie"	8:58
5.	"Universe 2"	4:43
6.	"Universe Conclusion"	3:40
7.	"Excerpt I"	7:06
8.	"Excerpt II"	5:19
9.	"Excerpt III"	1:35
10.	"Excerpt IV"	0:25
11.	"Excerpt V"	0:43
12.	"Excerpt VI"	0:34
13.	"Excerpt VII"	2:32
14.	"Excerpt VII"	3:46
15.	"Excerpt IX"	5:40
Total length:		1:12:37

== Personnel ==
Adopted from liner notes.

=== Primary personnel ===
- Phil Elverum – "Phil"
- Adam Forkner – "Scary Trumpets"
- Khaela Maricich – "Close Dark Voice"
- Calvin Johnson – "Universe"
- Kyle Field – "King Dark Death"
- Karl Blau – "Wind / Vultures"

=== "Chorus" ===
- Jenne Kliese
- Anna Oxygen
- Mirah Y.T. Zeitlyn

=== "Precipice Carolers" ===
- Kyle Field
- Phil Elverum
- Khaela Maricich
- Phan Nguyen
- Amber Bell
- Bethany Hays Parke
- Shawn Parke
- Hollis Parke
- Dennis Driscoll
- Zach Alarcon
- Adam Forkner

== Release history ==
Release dates and formats for Mount Eerie
Region	Date	Format	Label	Catalog num.
Japan	December 12, 2002	CD	7.e.p.	EPCD007
United States	January 21, 2003	LP, CD	K Records	KLP140
United States	August 20, 2013	LP, Digital download	P.W. Elverum & Sun	ELV032
