= It Was Hot, We Stayed in the Water =

Studio album by the Microphones
- Released: September 26, 2000
- Recorded: September 24, 1999 – March 6, 2000
- Studio: Dub Narcotic (Olympia, Washington)
- Genre: Indie rock; lo-fi; indie pop
- Length: 41:24
- Label: K; P.W. Elverum & Sun, Ltd.

The Microphones chronology
Window (2000)	It Was Hot, We Stayed in the Water (2000)	Blood (2001)

It Was Hot, We Stayed in the Water is the second studio album by American indie folk and indie rock band the Microphones. It was released by K Records on September 26, 2000. After gaining a small following with 1999's Don't Wake Me Up, frontman Phil Elverum recorded It Was Hot at Dub Narcotic Studio in Olympia, Washington, between September 1999 and March 2000. Recorded on analog tape, Elverum embraced the medium's technical imperfections. Classified by critics as indie rock, lo-fi, and indie pop, It Was Hot revolves thematically around the concept of water, with lyrics focusing on nature. The 11-minute track "The Glow" acts as the album's climax and introduces the concept of the "glow", which would be explored in more depth on the Microphones' subsequent studio album, The Glow Pt. 2.

On release, It Was Hot received positive reviews from Pitchfork, AllMusic, Rock Sound, and NME. Pitchfork listed the album at number seven in their "Top 20 Albums of 2000". Following its 2013 reissue, the album was critically reappraised, receiving positive reviews from PopMatters, Consequence of Sound, and Treblezine. The album is frequently compared to, and commonly said to be overshadowed by, The Glow Pt. 2.

== Background and recording ==
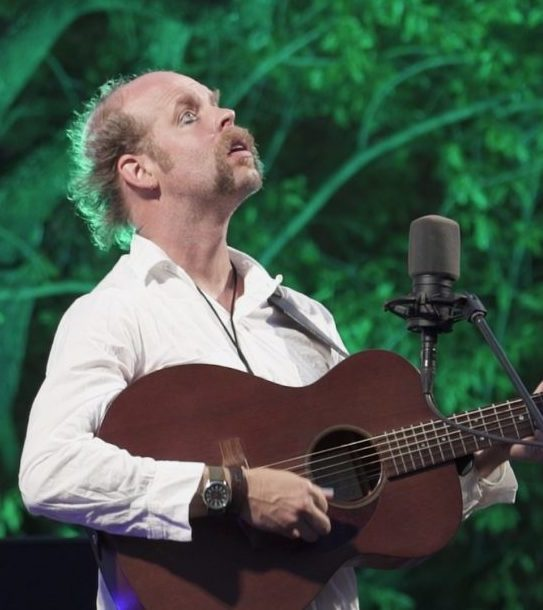
Elverum took inspiration from the poeticism and mysteriousness in Will Oldham's (pictured) lyrics.

Microphones frontman (Note: Despite the Microphones' involvement with many musicians, the project is considered synonymous with Elverum.) Phil Elverum released Don't Wake Me Up in 1999 via K Records. Although the album was recorded using low-fidelity studio equipment, Elverum managed to creatively work within the constraints of the technology's limitations, setting "a new precedent" for K Records, according to Mark Baumgarten. As a result of Don't Wake Me Up, Elverum gained a small audience, and K Records came to trust his musical abilities increasingly. Before It Was Hot's release, Elverum released two seven-inch singles, "Moon Moon" and "Feedback (Life, Love, Loop)", as well as the extended play Window:.

It Was Hot was recorded between September 24, 1999, and March 6, 2000, at Dub Narcotic Studio in Olympia, Washington. The studio, owned by K Records founder Calvin Johnson, was also used to record Elverum's previous album and lacked high-fidelity recording equipment. The album was recorded on analog tape, which made re-recording takes difficult; this, in turn, led Elverum to eschew perfectionism. Elverum would later cite this self-imposed limitation as the "technological reason for pursuing charismatic sloppiness". When Elverum began working on the songs that would eventually make up It Was Hot, he intended to release them individually, but after recording about half of the tracks, he realized that they were better suited for a full-length album.

While the album's liner notes do not distinguish individual contributions, Elverum later stressed that, in terms of writing credit, "there was definitely a sense of collaboration. [...] I had ideas, but then I was also open to other people's ideas". As an example, Elverum cited "(Something)", noting that "Khaela Maricich [of the band The Blow] wrote that song. That's her song."

== Music and themes ==
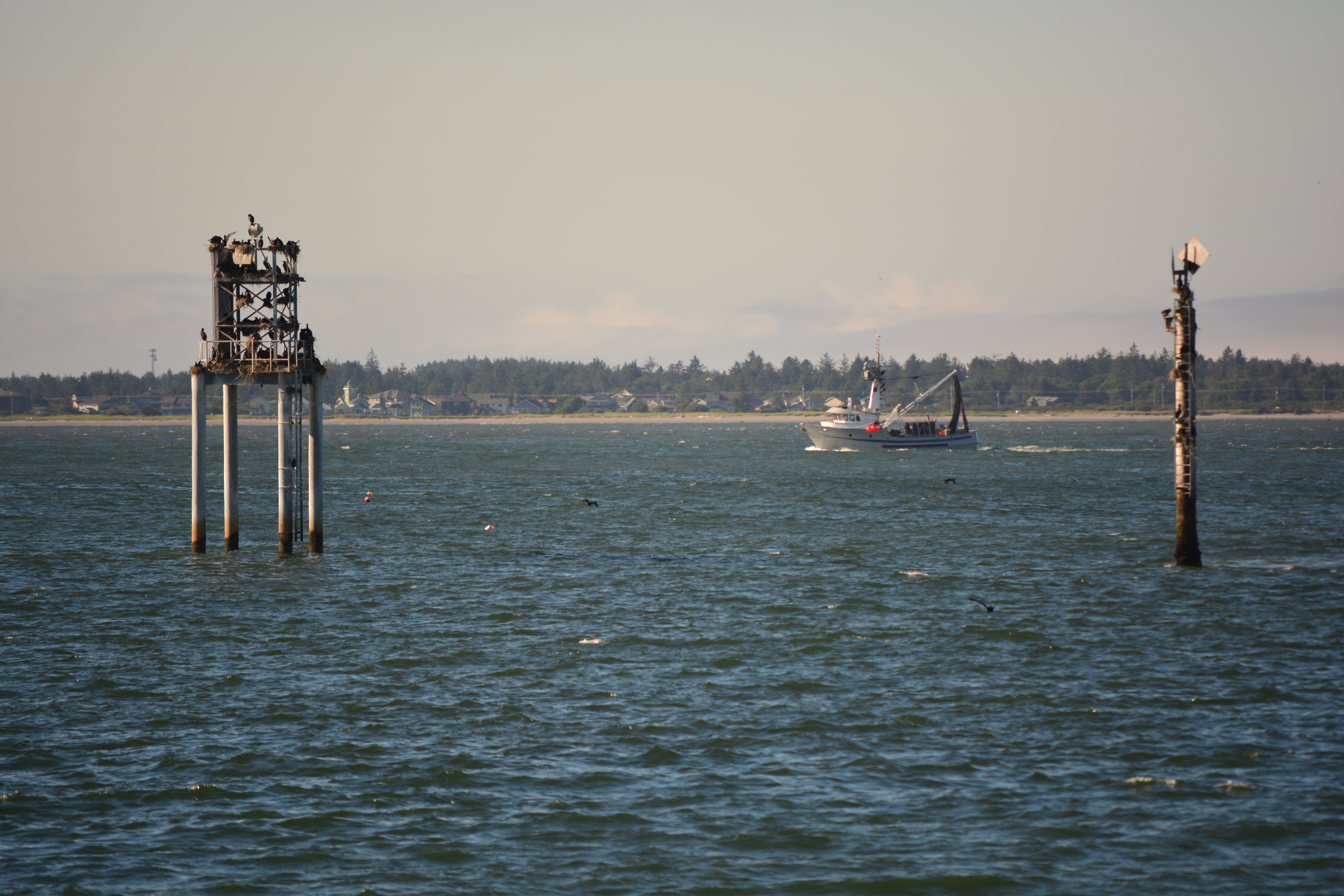
Elverum's visits to the ocean in Westport, Washington (pictured) influenced the album's theme of water.

Critics described It Was Hot, We Stayed in the Water as an indie rock, lo-fi, and indie pop album. According to Elverum, the album's lyrics were inspired by the poetic nature and mysteriousness of the works by American singer-songwriter Will Oldham. Thematically, the lyrics on It Was Hot focus on nature, reflecting Elverum's origins in the Pacific Northwest. Elverum explained, "when I was 21, [...] using these big, huge natural world metaphors to try and tell my own stories, I think I couldn't see outside of it. [...] It was like my only vocabulary." It Was Hot's central theme is water, beginning a trilogy of albums themed around an element of nature; The Glow, Pt. 2 and Mount Eerie are themed around fire and rock respectively. During recording, Elverum frequently visited the Westport, Washington, area, which led many of the songs to focus on the ocean, lakes, and swimming. The album introduced the concept of the "glow" on the 11-minute track "The Glow"; the concept was explored further in The Glow, Pt. 2. Elverum described the "glow" as a "glowing window that you see as you are freezing to death in the snow, or the light you go into supposedly when you die".

"The Pull"
A 29-second snippet from "The Pull", featuring rhythmically panning guitar tracks.

The opening track, "The Pull", begins with an acoustic guitar that rhythmically pans between the left and right speakers. The acoustic guitar later gives way to a dynamic shift: a burst of noisy guitars and reverbed snare drums, described by Matt LeMay of Pitchfork as a "sonic blast". LeMay also wrote, "despite the dissonance and the atypical song structure, the track never breaks down into complete anarchy". According to Adam Nelson of The Line of Best Fit, the lyrics of the track are about being free from a physical form; Nelson wrote that the track "makes death into an absolving liberation". The brief "Ice" begins with a similar blast of noise and percussion before winding down to an acoustic section. It features background vocals from Mirah. The track "Sand" is a cover of a 1993 Eric's Trip song of the same name. The cover, described by LeMay as "otherworldly", uses multiple layers of vocal harmonies and instrumentation. "Sand" ends abruptly, with the sound of a tape reel running out.

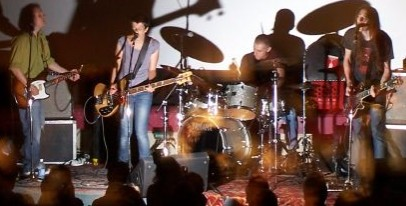
"Sand" is a cover of the 1993 song by Eric's Trip (pictured).

The 11-minute "The Glow", which acts as the album's climax, is made of separate segments, disjointedly connected. "The Glow" varies in sound fidelity, and uses elements of noise and drones. The track ends softly, with organs and emotional vocals from Elverum. Neil Kelly of PopMatters described the track as having an "epic genre-bending strut". "Karl Blau", in the style of 1950s pop, was partly inspired by a dream Elverum had about one of his musical collaborators, Karl Blau. The three-minute track "Drums" is composed entirely of drum solos, which Sputnikmusic's joshuatree described as a "cacophony". "The Gleam" is a pop song filled with noisy audio feedback; Elverum's vocals are barely audible amid the noise. "The Gleam" and "(Something)" use drones similar to "The Glow", and the two-minute interlude "The Breeze" uses experimental elements. "Between Your Ear and the Other Ear" utilizes elements of freak folk and audio feedback. The album's closer, "Organs", has a swell of guitars and keyboards, described by LeMay as "ominous".

== Release and reception ==
Professional ratings
Review scores
Source	Rating
AllMusic	4/5 stars
Consequence of Sound	B
NME	8/10
Pitchfork	9.2/10
PopMatters	8/10
Rock Sound	4/5 stars
Spectrum Culture	4.5/5
Sputnikmusic	4.5/5

It Was Hot was released on September 26, 2000, via K Records. The album was shipped alongside extras—like sheet music and posters—when ordered from K's website (kpunk.com). Upon its release, the album received positive reviews from publications. In Heather Phares of AllMusic's undated (Note: The review was published prior to the album's 2013 reissue, per a 2012 archive; Phares has been writing for AllMusic since before the album's release, per her biography.) review, she said the band presents "delicate, almost folky melodies wrapped up in and surrounded by waves of droning, distorted guitars, and organs". Phares compared tracks from the album to those of other artists, but affirmed that the band's similarities "feel like tributes", not plagiarism. In Matt LeMay of Pitchfork's review, he gave a score of 9.2 out of 10. LeMay praised the album's originality and how it broke rock music's conventions, providing an "element of surprise" he found missing in rock. Reviewers from NME and Rock Sound also evaluated the album and gave positive ratings. Pitchfork later listed the album at number seven in their year-end "Top 20 Albums of 2000". Sputnikmusic's joshuatree reviewed the album in 2008, praising its "unpredictable nature", and called it Phil Elverum's second-best work, after The Glow Pt. 2.

On May 28, 2013, the album was reissued by Elverum's label, P.W. Elverum & Sun. The album's reissue caused renewed interest, and it received reviews from multiple publications. Neil Kelly of PopMatters wrote "in hindsight, it really is a miracle that music with these kinds of dynamics would see the daylight". Kelly praised the album for its sonic diversity, and for the production of "The Glow"; he called the album a "feast of inspiration to revisit time and time again." Spectrum Culture's Joe Clinkenbeard described the album as similar to Elverum's other work in that it "thrives on chaos, quiet and in juxtaposing the two". Steven Arroyo of Consequence of Sound wrote, "The Microphones sound is inseparable from nature and the outdoors [...] and so too is It Was Hot from the magical glowing buzz of a summer night swim, about which Elverum repeatedly sings." Paul Pearson of Treblezine noted the album's recording imperfections and its intimacy. Pearson wrote, "[the album] is a study in subjection and liberation, crossing through warmed tides to ice and back again." According to Daniel Mescher of Colorado Public Radio, the album is "widely regarded as [an] indie pop classic". Patrick Lyons of Stereogum reviewed the album in 2020, comparing "The Pull"'s guitar to the opening of Microphones in 2020, then newly-released. According to Lyons, the album solidified the sound of Don't Wake Me Up without giving up its "roughshod charm". Martin Douglas of KEXP reviewed the album in 2022, noting Elverum's boyish voice, the album's intimacy, and the inspiration the album had on "any weirdo singer/songwriter crafting dense musical epics in their basement since the turn of the century".

It Was Hot, We Stayed in the Water is commonly described as overshadowed by the more popular The Glow Pt. 2. Douglas opined, "Not many artists can say they wrote their masterpiece [It Was Hot] and then a year later, wrote another masterpiece [The Glow, Pt. 2]". Spectrum Culture's Joe Clinkenbeard called The Glow Pt. 2 the album's "better known sibling" and said It Was Hot "was given little chance to sit with listeners". Joshuatree described The Glow Pt. 2 as Elverum's "peak", but still called It Was Hot its "just-as-pretty twin" with "too little attention directed towards" it. According to Patrick Lyons of Stereogum, It Was Hot "lacks the vast scope and deep emotional core of its follow-up" but it "unfairly lived in the shadow" of The Glow Pt. 2. Elverum said, "I mostly don't pay that much attention to how the stuff I've made is ranked in comparison to itself".

== Track listing ==
All tracks written by the Microphones unless noted. (Note: The album's liner notes do not list the writing credits for each individual track, so in this track listing, the tracks are attributed to the band as a whole.)

No.	Title	Length
1.	"The Pull"	4:53
2.	"Ice"	2:19
3.	"Sand" (Eric's Trip cover)	1:52
4.	"The Glow"	11:06
5.	"Karl Blau"	1:43
6.	"Drums"	3:18
7.	"The Gleam"	2:52
8.	"The Breeze"	2:00
9.	"(Something)"	4:34
10.	"Between Your Ear and the Other Ear"	3:13
11.	"Organs"	3:28
Total length:		41:24

== Personnel ==
Adapted from the album's liner notes.

- Phil Elverum – vocals, songwriting, engineering, and primary artist
- Karl Blau – engineering
- Khaela Maricich
- Mirah - guest
- Jenn Kliese
- Anna Oxygen
- Jason Wall
- Calvin Johnson

== Release history ==
Release dates and formats for It Was Hot, We Stayed In The Water
Region	Date	Format	Label	Catalog num.
United States	September 26, 2000	LP, CD	K Records	KLP116
United States	May 28, 2013	LP, digital download	P.W. Elverum & Sun	ELV029
