= Tests (album) =

Compilation album by The Microphones
- Released: 1998, 2011
- Studio: The Business
- Genre: Indie folk, experimental rock, experimental
- Length: 61:56 (CD)
- Label: Knw-Yr-Own (KYO30); Elsinor (els 029); P.W. ELVERUM & SUN, ltd.

The Microphones chronology
Wires and Cords (1997)	Tests (1998)	Don't Wake Me Up (1999)

Tests is an album by The Microphones. It was first released as a cassette tape on Knw-Yr-Own in 1998. A CD release by Elsinor followed in the same year, but the track listing was a mixture of The Microphones's three previous albums: Microphone, Wires and Cords, and the Tests cassette. Most of the material was recorded at The Business while Elverum worked there.

Tests was re-issued on cassette in an edition of 20 by P.W. ELVERUM & SUN, ltd. The re-issue was to celebrate Record Store Day 2011 and was only available at The Business in Anacortes, WA. A few additional copies were sold online via P.W. ELVERUM & SUN, ltd.

== Track listing ==
=== Cassette ===
Side A

1. "Microphone Part 2"
2. "Tests" (Phil version)
3. "Feedback Love"
4. "Bomb on Tape Deck Mt."
5. "Tape Deck Ghost"
6. "Bass Leftovers"
7. "Like A Piranha"
8. "Assault on Tape Deck Mt."
9. "Spy Cameras"
10. "Drums That No One Played / El Nino"
11. "Death on Tape Deck Mt."
12. "The Last Night of the Year"

Side B

1. "PreAmp"
2. "Rebirth on Tape Deck Mt."
3. "Eyes for Volume"
4. "Quiet Groove"
5. "OH ANNA"
6. "Summer Electricity"
7. "Little Songs"
8. "Anacortes Has a Secret Love"
9. "Night Time, Then Sleep"

=== CD ===
1. "Tests" – 1:36
2. "Feedback Love" – 2:46
3. "Tape Deck Ghost" – 3:22
4. "Like a Piranha" – 4:05
5. "Soundwaves" – 3:01
6. "Drums That No One Played / El Nino" – 2:22
7. "Anacortes Has a Secret Love" – 3:11
8. "Oh Anna" – 3:20
9. "Spy Cameras" – 3:37
10. "Witch Doctor" – 2:35
11. "Monsters" – 3:49
12. "The Last Night of the Year" – 4:54
13. "PreAmp" – 2:29
14. "Quiet Groove" – 2:59
15. "Little Songs" – 4:18
16. "Microphone Pt. 1" – 2:02
17. "Microphone Pt. 2" – 2:23
18. "Eyes for Volume" – 2:43
19. "Wires and Cords" – 6:35
