= The Glow Pt. 2 =

2001 studio album by the Microphones

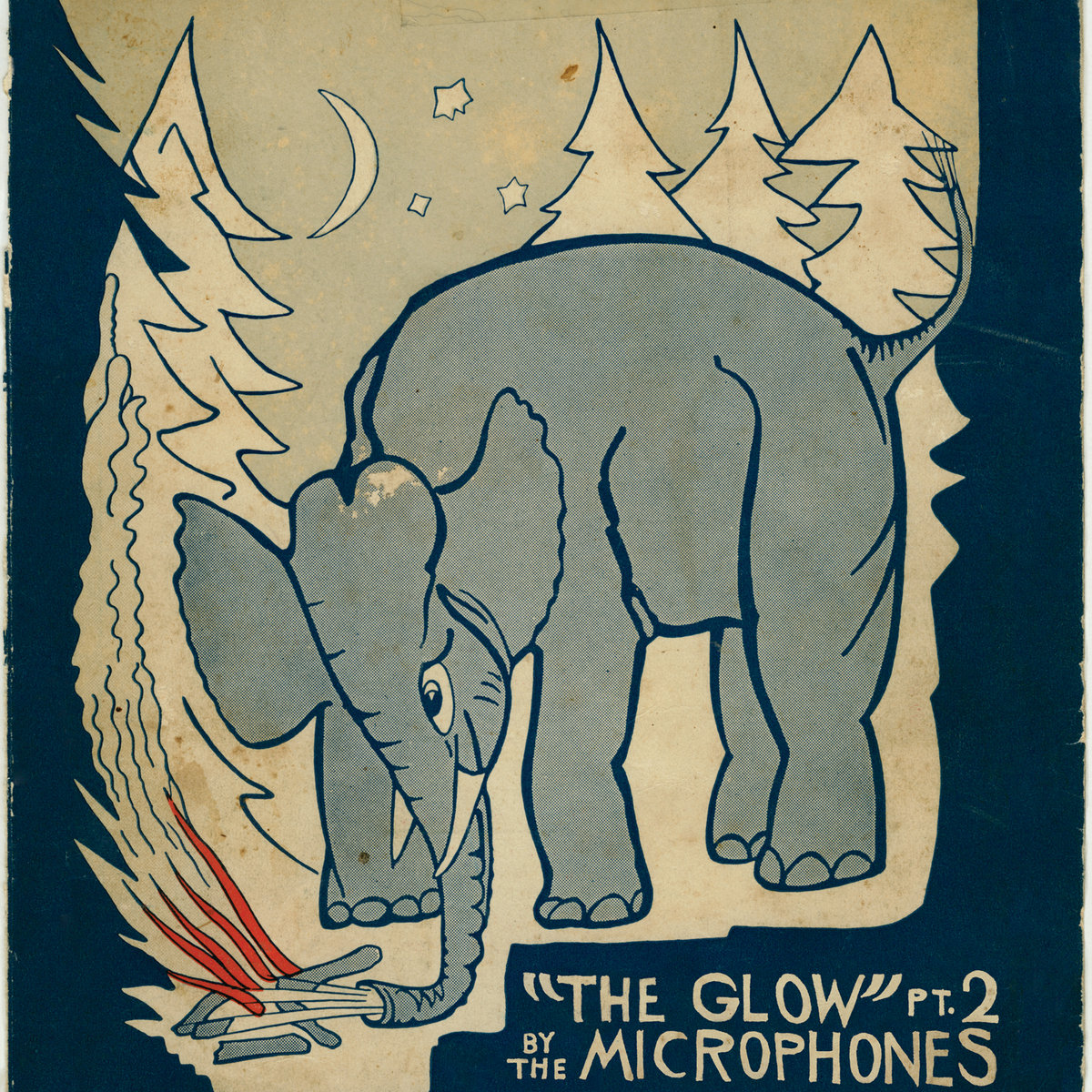

Studio album by the Microphones
- Released: September 11, 2001
- Recorded: May 23, 2000 – March 23, 2001
- Studios: Dub Narcotic, Olympia, Washington
- Genres: Lo-fi; indie folk; slacker rock; psychedelic folk; noise rock; ambient
- Length: 66:38
- Labels: K Records; P.W. Elverum & Sun, Ltd.
- Producer: Phil Elverum

The Microphones chronology
Blood (2001)	The Glow Pt. 2 (2001)	Song Islands (2002)

Singles from The Glow Pt. 2
- 1. "The Moon" Released: 2001

The Glow Pt. 2 is the third studio album by American indie folk and indie rock project the Microphones. It was released on September 11, 2001, through K Records and later through P.W. Elverum & Sun, Ltd. Recording was done on analog equipment at Dub Narcotic, Olympia, Washington, from May 2000 to March 2001. The album takes influences from numerous music genres such as extreme metal, ambient and avant-garde music, as well as non-musical sources like the American drama television show Twin Peaks and primary member Phil Elverum's relationship to Khaela Maricich. Elverum was responsible for the album's production in its entirety.

Musically, The Glow Pt. 2 diverts from the band's previous studio release It Was Hot, We Stayed in the Water, and features experimental production, alongside musical techniques and lyrics that often reference nature and the Pacific Northwest. For promotion, Elverum embarked on The Paper Opera Tour with Calvin Johnson and Khaela Maricich, before going on a solo tour of North America. In the years following its release, the album has been reissued multiple times, with the first in 2007 including a disc of bonus material. An immediate critical success, it has since appeared in multiple rankings of the best albums of the 2000s, and is considered by many music critics to be the Microphones' best work and an important release in the lo-fi genre.

== Background and recording ==
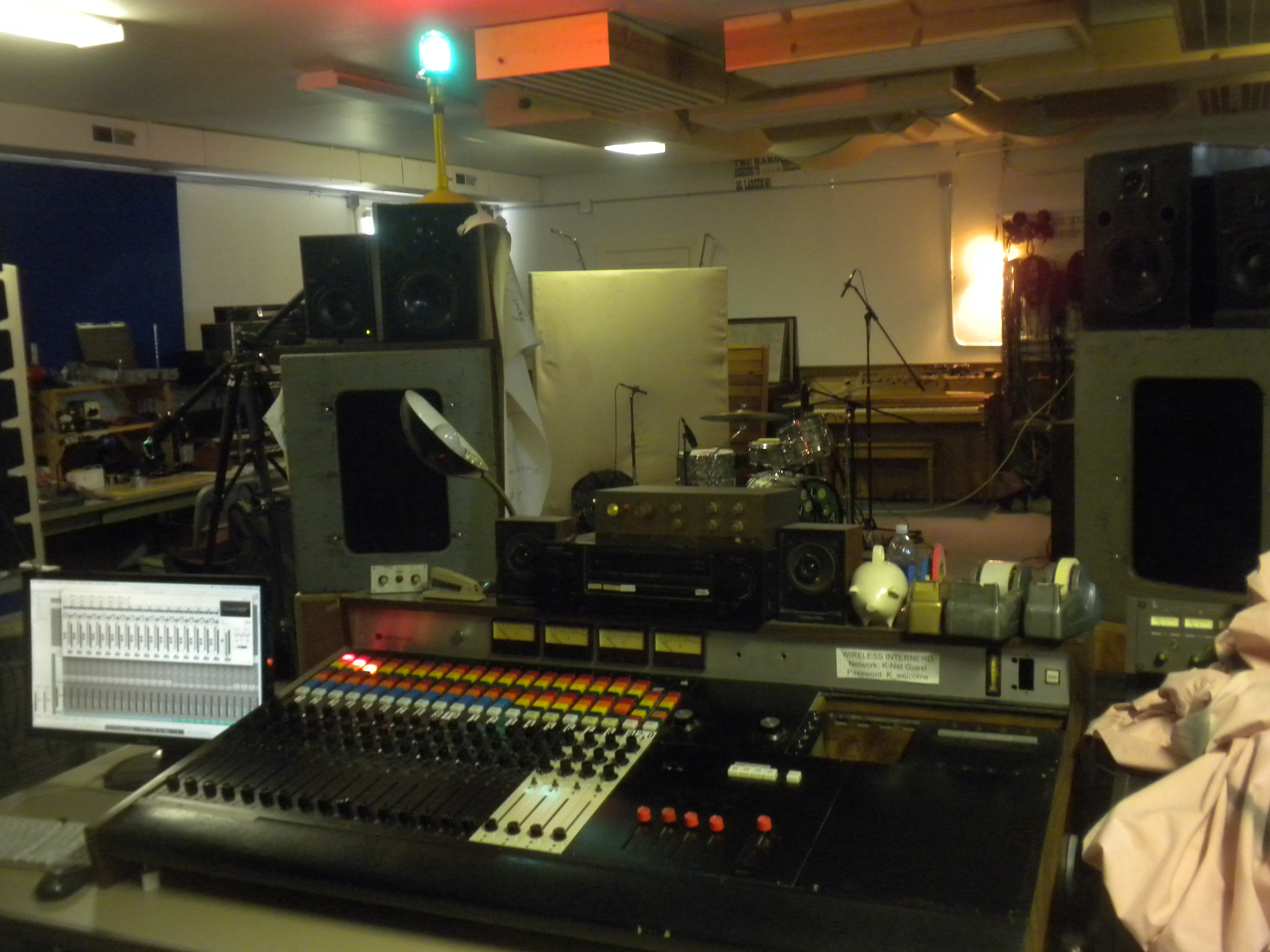
Dub Narcotic Studio seen in 2013.

The Glow Pt. 2 was recorded between May 23, 2000, and March 23, 2001, at Dub Narcotic, Olympia, Washington. Elverum hoped to achieve a more organic sound by recording it on a 16 track analog tape. He would generally record the songs early in the morning, alone. He wrote the songs alongside recording them, being at times accompanied by Mirah who would frequently compliment his material and predict that, "This record is going to be something special." The Glow Pt. 2 was recorded entirely in stereo.

The original recording chart for "I Want Wind To Blow".

Elverum created the distortion on the album via "running the guitar through the mic input on a thrift store cassette deck, then out the headphone jack into the amp". The distorted drums were recorded by raising the volume on the microphones, particularly Sennheiser MKH 405, and using compressors. The drums were recorded via multi-tracking with the snare and bass drum added after the initial recording. Elverum used his Chamberlin Rhythmate 40 drum machine on The Glow Pt. 2 with the machine being credited as "Karl Blau", a friend of Elverum.

The Glow Pt. 2 was influenced by extreme metal, ambient, and avant-garde music. The record's tone and atmosphere were also influenced by the American drama television show Twin Peaks. The cover art for The Glow Pt. 2 originated from an antique Dutch cookbook entitled Calvé-Delft's Winterboekje, which was printed from 1933 to 1934.

== Music and lyrics ==
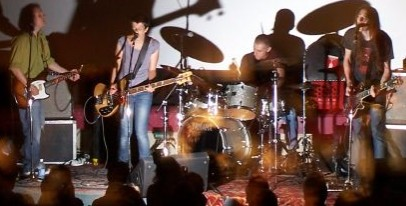
Canadian indie rock band Eric's Trip influenced Elverum's use of recurring imagery and themes.

The Glow Pt. 2 marked a shift in Elverum's writing from the "short, straightforward pop songs" of the Microphones' previous studio album It Was Hot, We Stayed in the Water to a more abstract, symbolic style, although it uses "similar sounds and songwriting styles". Elverum's lyrics range from being highly specific to "macrocosmic" in scale. The lyrics are performed in a stream of consciousness manner and frequently reference nature and the Pacific Northwest while exhibiting a sense of longing. The songs are equally diverse, ranging from ambient pieces, to acoustic folk songs, to "expansive multitracked forces of nature", with multi-tracking being utilised on songs such as "I'll Not Contain You". Sudden piano stabs and abrupt rhythm and key changes are present throughout The Glow Pt. 2. Elverum employs multiple unique production techniques, such as compartmentalising individual notes to separate audio tracks and arranging the tracks to perform the melody in sequence. "Call-and-response" panning is featured on the song "Instrumental". (Note: Citation does not specify which (Instrumental).)

The theme of fire is central to the album. The fire on the artwork is meant to be a representation of "the Glow"; this was first introduced on the fourth track of It Was Hot, We Stayed in the Water, which Elverum stated was a "glowing window that you see as you are freezing to death in the snow, or the light you go into supposedly when you die". Of the presence of "the Glow" on The Glow Pt. 2, Elverum said it represents "one's inner 'life force'". Themes of flesh, blood, water, wood, life, death and overcoming depression are also central to the album.

A 17-second sample of the chorus to "I Want Wind to Blow", featuring four vocal tracks. The first track is of Elverum singing and the other three are used to form an elongated chord.

The opening track "I Want Wind to Blow" was recorded on January 1, 2001. Elverum wrote the melody in Philadelphia while on tour. The countermelody to the song is played in the key of G major, though the main melody is played in a higher register. The instrumentation for the song was performed by Elverum; he recorded the piano tracks far away from the microphone to capture the natural sounds of the piano in the studio, which would otherwise not be picked up. The guitar sections were intended to resemble the sound of water by miking the amp and strings while two stereos were used to create stereophonic sound. The song records Elverum scraping a snare drum.

The title "I Want Wind to Blow" was explained by Elverum: "I want crazy events to happen to me. I'm tired of gray. Give me black or white." His relationship to Khaela Maricich and its subsequent dissolution are mentioned on the song with the opening lyrics referencing their breakup, the changing weather of the time (with the weather serving as a metaphor for his emotions), and their Beach Boys cover band The Thunder Clouds.

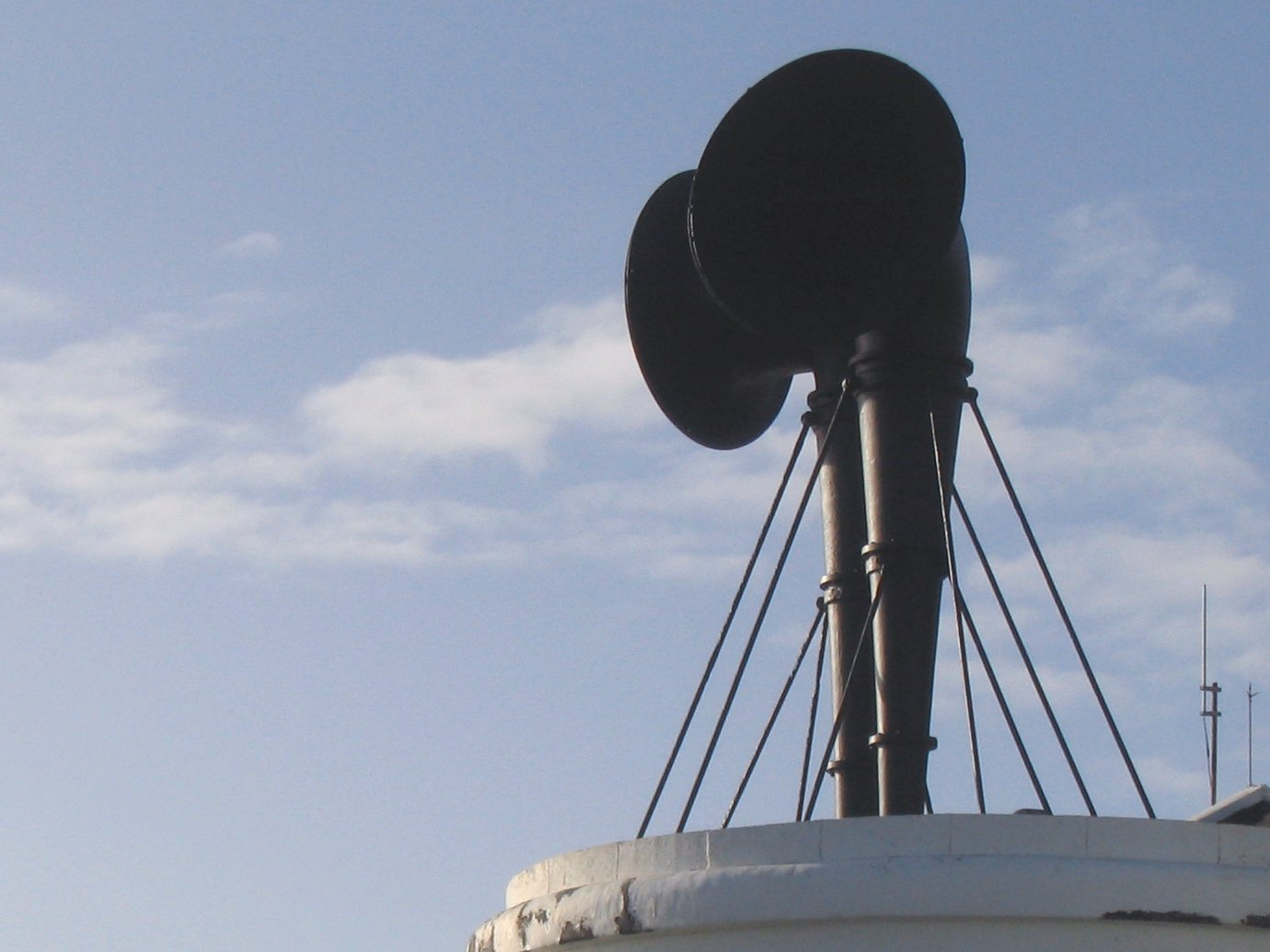
Foghorns, whose sound is a recurring motif.

Elverum explains that the title track is about the desire to wallow in self pity: "Being annoyed at your heart for still beating." It features the line "my blood flows harshly," which Elverum holds for 14 seconds. Dan Hancox of The Guardian compared Elverum's mood on the song to that of a "disaster survivor". "The album's third track, "The Moon", features acoustic guitar chords alongside Elverum whispering lyrics, with him having found the inspiration for the song in his routine nightly walks. The first song entitled "Instrumental" features finger-snaps. The foghorn is a recurring motif throughout The Glow Pt. 2. "Map" opens with a brief interlude that consists of a foghorn, which leads into distorted organs, a kick drum, and vocals. The track finishes in the same manner it starts, with the sound of a foghorn. "I Felt My Size" opens with atmospheric noise and chaotic guitar strumming. It then transitions to a simplistic melody accompanied by metaphorical lyrics, childlike vocals, synths, pianos and double-timed drums, before concluding with a foghorn.

The songs "I'll Not Contain You" and "I Felt Your Shape" discuss the "impossible desire to hold on to fleeting things". Elverum stated that "I Felt Your Shape" is about hugging someone in a sensitive empathetic manner instead of a possessive manner. It is followed by “Samurai Sword”, a heavier track which has been described as a “furious drum storm”. The song title is taken from a quote from Life-Giving Sword by Yagyu Munenori which is also replicated in the liner notes. The song's lyrics are signed by "Samurai Phil" and are the only in the liner notes to be attributed to any one at all.

The final song "My Warm Blood" is an ambient composition, which resembles the opener "I Want Wind to Blow". The song ends with the sound of Elverum's heartbeat. It is connected to the opening track "I. The Sun" on the Microphones' fourth studio album Mount Eerie (2003).

== Release and promotion ==
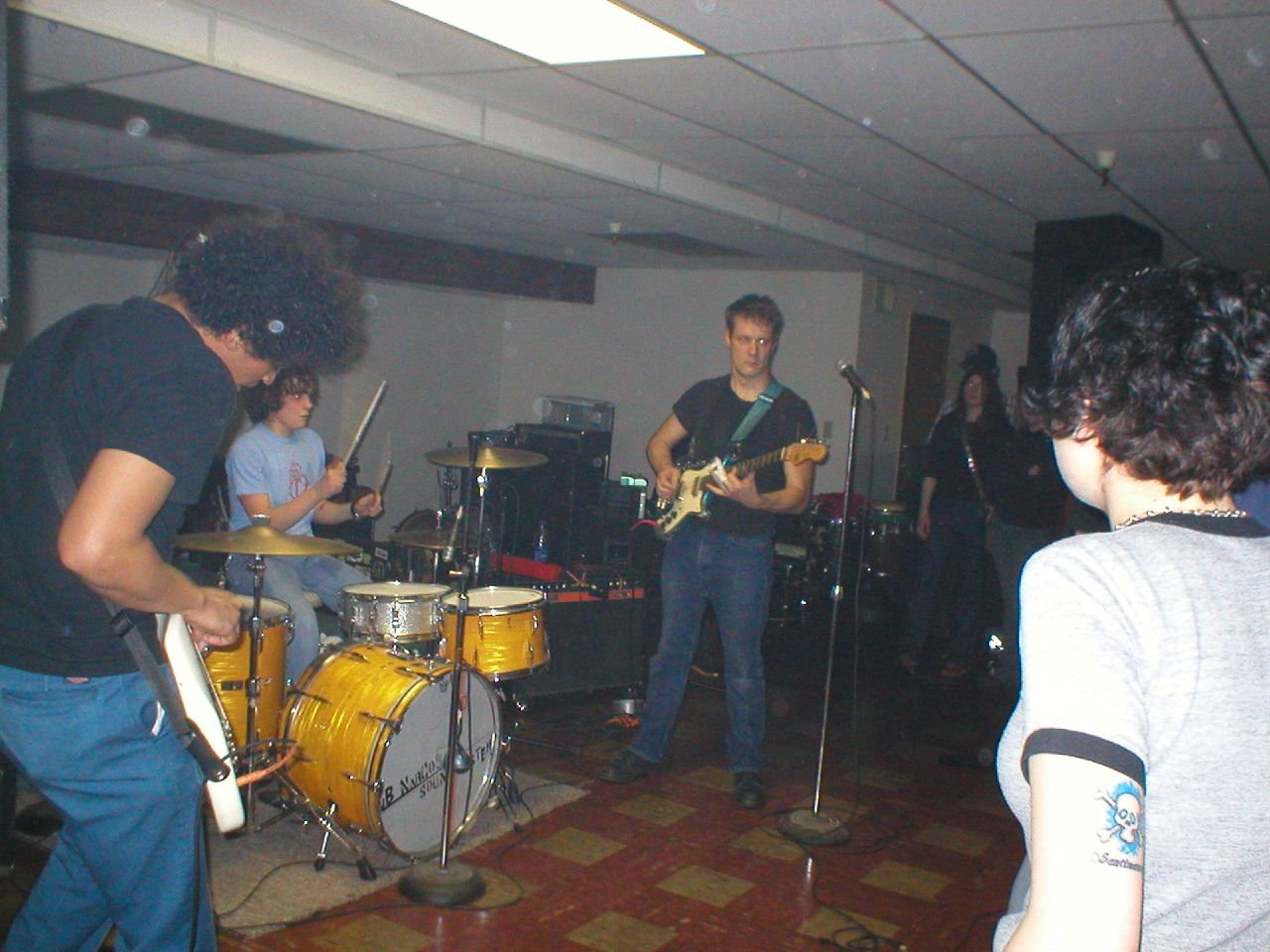
Calvin Johnson (pictured in the middle) playing in 2002 at Dub Narcotic where Elverum recorded the album.

After releasing the album on September 11, 2001, Elverum went on The Paper Opera Tour alongside Calvin Johnson and Khaela Maricich. The tour encompassed North America and Europe, with the three playing in venues that included a women's club on the Jersey Shore, a historic Boston movie theater, and an art studio in Washington D.C. The Paper Opera Tour featured short plays, dance routines, and "human simulations of the solar system"; audience participation was a major factor of the tour. Elverum went on a six-week long tour in North America by himself afterwards. In 2019, Elverum performed the title track at What The Heck Fest.

Elverum later acknowledged the coincidence of the album's release with the September 11 attacks, writing in 2022 that it was released on "Sept. 11th, 2001 (I know)". In a 2026 interview, Elverum said that he likely began selling copies at shows before the official release date.

The Glow Pt. 2 has been reissued multiple times. The first reissue was in 2007 by K Records with a collection of then-unreleased songs and versions of previously released songs. The collection was titled Other Songs & Destroyed Versions. The album was later reissued in 2008 due to being out of print on CD and vinyl. The album was again reissued in 2013 on July 9, without the extra collection of songs. The album was released under his label P. W. Elverum & Sun, Ltd. Due to K Records' failure to properly bookkeep, it is unknown how many copies of The Glow Pt. 2 have been sold.

== Critical reception ==
Professional ratings
Contemporaneous reviews (published in 2001–2003)
Review scores
Source	Rating
Pitchfork	9.2/10
Stylus Magazine	A−

The Glow Pt. 2 was met with generally positive reviews from contemporary music critics. Dave Heaton of PopMatters described the Microphones' approach to music as "free and idiosyncratic", while calling the approach "constrained by few boundaries, a fact that allows them to travel through various unique musical lands". Stylus Magazine's Tyler Martin asserted that the Microphones "spew innovation every second of this disc" and noted that the album "promises something you have never heard before and delivers it, perhaps more than you'd expect".

Craig Dunsmuir of Exclaim! stated that the album is an example of "where the cliché of 'hearing new things in it every time you listen' actually rings true". He continued, describing the album as having "substantial quality". Matt LeMay of Pitchfork described the album as an "alive" and "sprawling, swirling composition", while stating that "parts of The Glow Pt. 2 are absolutely breathtaking" due to its stereoscopic enhancements. LeMay felt that the album "exceeds even its predecessor in capturing the simultaneous wrath and fragility of nature", and praised the title track as being "the single most breathtaking song on the album". Pitchfork later ranked it as the best album of 2001. According to Christopher Roberts of Under the Radar, The Glow Pt. 2 "was one of the most acclaimed and beloved indie rock albums at the start of the millennium".

== Legacy ==
Professional ratings
Retrospective reviews (published after 2003)
Review scores
Source	Rating
AllMusic	5/5 stars
Consequence of Sound	4.5/5 stars
Pitchfork (2008)	9.3/10
PopMatters	9/10
Under the Radar	9/10

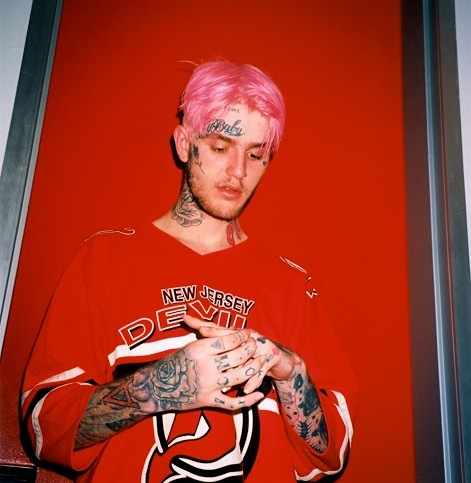
American rapper Lil Peep sampled the songs "(Something)", "Headless Horseman", and "I'll Not Contain You". (Note: Citation does not specify which (something).)

Retrospective reviews of The Glow Pt. 2 have expressed stronger general critical acclaim for the album. It has since become a cult classic, ranking as one of Elverum's most critically acclaimed and popular albums; considered by many to be his best work and one of the best lo-fi albums. However the album's status as "Elverum's masterpiece" has in later years been questioned. According to First Order Historians, the release of The Glow Pt. 2 "created a tidal wave of buzz in the indie community". Konstantinos Pappis of Our Culture Mag described the album as "seminal", while Daniel Mescher called it a "widely regarded indie pop classic". Grayson Haver Currin from Bandcamp viewed The Glow Pt. 2, as an important release in Elverum's career, stating that it "began to make the Microphones an indie rock commodity". Aquarium Drunkard, and Thomas Britt of PopMatters also saw the album as important for Elverum's career, viewing it as the culmination of his work as part of the Microphones, with Britt writing that "The introspective lyrics and rough, yet complex, sonic textures of Phil Elverum's Microphones output reached an unparalleled peak with The Glow Pt. 2." On a similar note, Aquarium Drunkard calling it a "blueprint for multiple artists".

American rapper Lil Peep sampled the songs "(Something)", "Headless Horseman" and "I'll Not Contain You". Canadian record producer Ryan Hemsworth sampled "Instrumental" in a mash-up with Three Six Mafia’s "Late Nite Tip" (1996). American electronic pop duo Sylvan Esso's song "The Glow" (2017) is centered around The Glow Pt. 2, which was one of the first albums that lead singer Amelia Meath "really loved". American singer-songwriter Kevin Morby's third studio album Singing Saw (2016) was inspired by The Glow Pt. 2, taking inspiration from the title track in particular. Fellow singer-songwriter David Longstreth cited it as one of the best albums of the 2000s. American musician Jack Tatum of Wild Nothing noted that the album "challenged my whole notion of what recorded music was supposed to be", with him calling it one of his favourite albums and "The Moon" his favourite song.

In a review of the album's 2008 reissue, Brian Howe of Pitchfork stated that The Glow Pt. 2 remained Elverum's "crowning achievement" and that "seven years of imitation have done nothing to dull its impact—it sounds as unaccountably grand now as it did in 2001". Brock Thiessen of Exclaim! described the album as "a brave new world where solar noise bursts over sprawling epics of the most intimate nature", and stated that "it's clear age hasn't tainted the kaleidoscopic Glow Pt. 2 in the least". Under the Radar writer Wendy Lynch praised the album and labelled the Microphones as "one of the most original, interesting bands to come out in the last 3 years". Heather Phares of AllMusic stated that "it's The Glow, Pt. 2's deep, nearly spiritual yearning that makes it the Microphones' most compelling album to date". Eric Grandy of The Stranger called the album "the apex of [Elverum]'s songwriting skill." In 2012, Corey Beasley included the album at number four on a list dedicated to ranking Pitchfork's number one albums from 1996 to 2011, calling the album Elverum's "creative peak".

After a second reissue of The Glow Pt. 2 in 2013, Colin Joyce of Consequence of Sound hailed the album as "a masterwork of sequencing as it bleeds and blends from track to track". In The Guardian's "Hidden treasures" column, Hancox described the album as "a masterstroke" and "a millennial Daydream Nation".

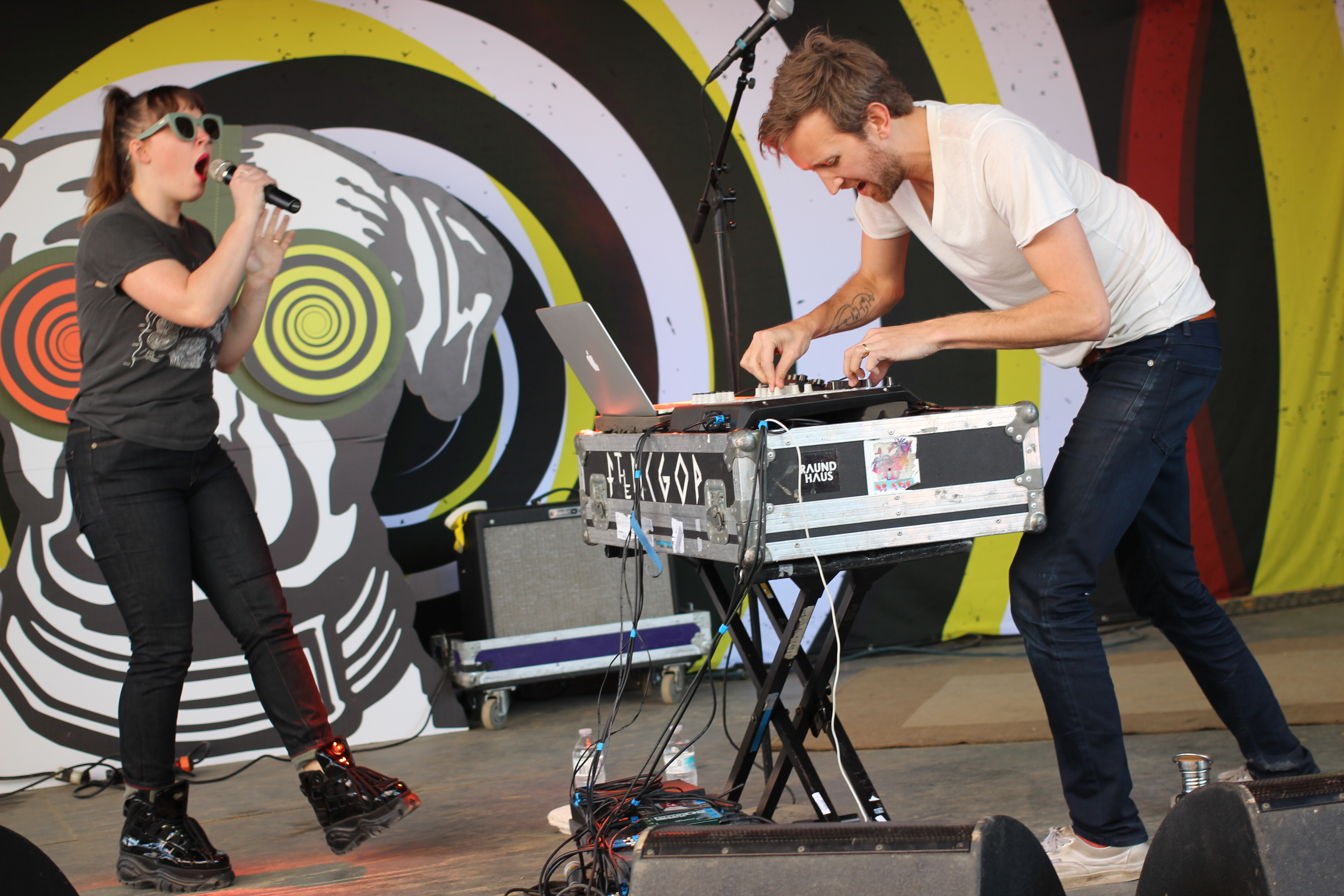
American electronic pop duo Sylvan Esso's song "The Glow" (2017) is centered around The Glow Pt. 2.

Stephen Krock of That Music Magazine called The Glow Pt. 2 "ingenious" and the Microphones' "definitive work". L.A. Record's Cypress Marrs called the album a definitive release in the indie folk genre. Adam Nelson of The Line of Best Fit lauded The Glow Pt. 2 as an "essential work of modern indie", while Stereogum's retrospective feature on it stated that the album's "bond with listeners, as individuals" surpasses its critical success. In the years since release, The Glow Pt. 2 has been included on numerous retrospective lists. Pitchfork included it on their list of the best albums from 2000 to 2004 and of the 2000s decade, and their ranking of the best indie rock albums from Pacific Northwest artists. The website's readers also ranked the album as one of the best from 1996 to 2011. Stylus Magazine included it on their list of the best albums from 2000 to 2005. Cokemachineglow, Stereogum and Tiny Mix Tapes all included The Glow Pt. 2 on their lists of the best albums of the 2000s. In 2019, The Guardian ranked the album as one of the best albums of the 21st century. Spin included it on their list of the best albums from 1985 to 2014. In 2024, Paste Magazine ranked The Glow Pt. 2 number 189 on its list of the 300 Greatest Albums of All Time.

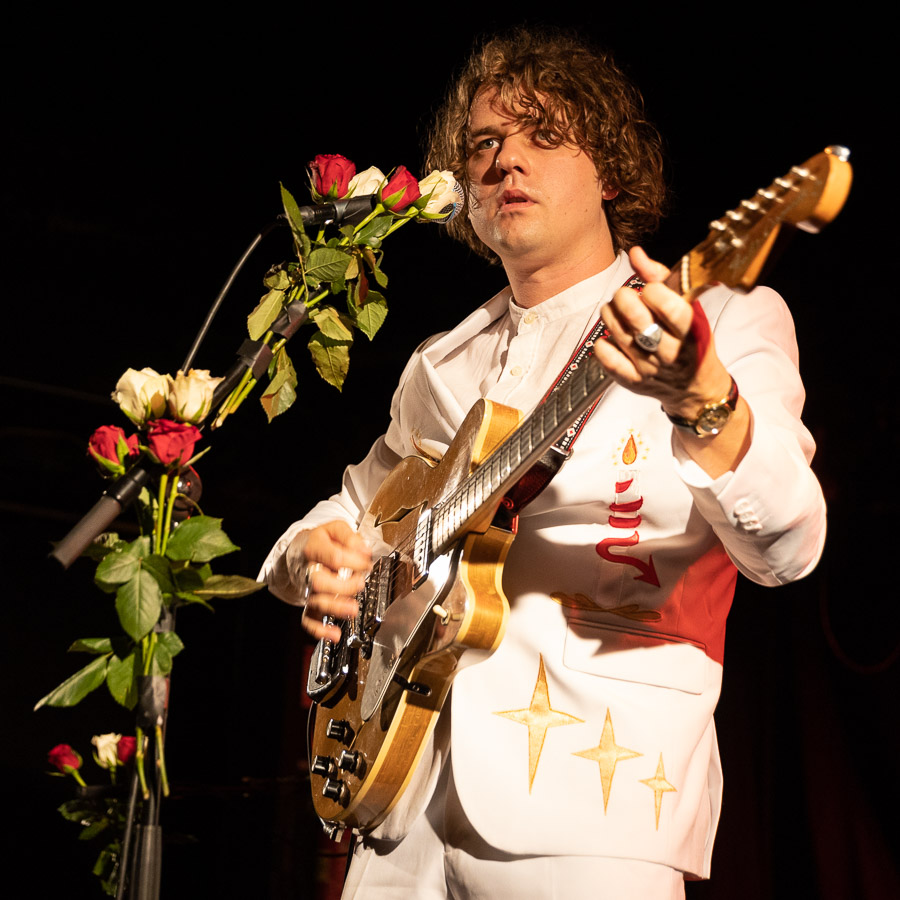
American singer-songwriter Kevin Morby's third studio album Singing Saw was inspired by The Glow Pt. 2.

Jason Lipshutz of Billboard chose "Instrumental", the album's sixth track, as one of the "greatest interludes of all time". Donovan Farley of Willamette Week chose "I Want Wind to Blow" and "The Glow Pt. 2" as two of Elverum's "essential" songs; Morgan Enos chose "Headless Horseman" as one of Elverum's essential songs for Billboard. Eric Hill from Exclaim! included The Glow Pt. 2 in a ranking of Elverum's "essential" albums, as did Ian Gormley. Elverum was grateful for the attention the album had received but was disillusioned with the "canonization" the album gathered from music publications, stating the idea that "albums are 'good' or 'bad' or 'essential' or not is a total myth that can usually be purchased by getting a more expensive publicist". His fifth studio album as a part of the Microphones name, Microphones in 2020, released in 2020, made direct references to The Glow Pt. 2.

== Track listing ==
The Glow Pt. 2 track listing
No.	Title	Length
1.	"I Want Wind to Blow" (Full title is 'I Want Wind to Blow my "Clothes" Off Me')	5:32
2.	"The Glow Pt. 2"	4:58
3.	"The Moon"	5:16
4.	"Headless Horseman"	3:08
5.	"My Roots Are Strong and Deep"	1:53
6.	"Instrumental"	1:38
7.	"The Mansion"	3:52
8.	"(something)" (Track 8 is skipped on the original CD's track listing.)	1:38
9.	"(something)"	2:42
10.	"I'll Not Contain You"	2:50
11.	"The Gleam Pt. 2"	1:57
12.	"Map"	5:00
13.	"You'll Be in the Air"	2:41
14.	"I Want to Be Cold"	1:41
15.	"I Am Bored"	1:36
16.	"I Felt My Size"	2:24
17.	"Instrumental"	1:52
18.	"I Felt Your Shape"	1:54
19.	"Samurai Sword"	4:07
20.	"My Warm Blood"	9:28
Total length:		66:38

== Other Songs & Destroyed Versions ==
Other Songs & Destroyed Versions

Compilation album by the Microphones
- Released: 2007
- Length: 43:08
- Label: K Records

The 2007 reissue of The Glow Pt. 2 included a second disc, Other Songs & Destroyed Versions, which contains 20 additional tracks that were composed during and after the recording of the album. The term "destroyed version" refers to Elverum isolating and "unmixing" the songs that appeared on The Glow Pt. 2 to aid "the feeling of the album as a cohesive thing".

=== Music and lyrics ===
"Where Lies My Tarp?" features lyrical metaphors, alongside guitars and drumming. "I Want the Wind to Blow (Backwards)" takes influence from dub music as well as featuring a dial-noise throughout the song. The lyrics, including those on "I'm Like You, Tree", continue the references to nature established on The Glow Pt. 2.

=== Critical reception ===
Thiessen of Exclaim! described Other Songs & Destroyed Versions as essential. Howe asserted that while "none of the new lyrics clarify the overarching story", the new tracks on the album "reveal a few more glimpses of a distant, haunting world that's all the more alluring for its incompleteness". Writing for PopMatters, Dan Raper stated that "Microphones fans will find Other Songs & Destroyed Versions more than worth the investment."

Grandy wrote that "the alternate versions reveal hidden dimensions to the album's songs", giving particular praise to the song "Where Lies My Tarp?".

In a mixed review, John Lingan of Splice Today wrote: "I can’t imagine anyone but a long-since converted Microphones nut sifting through this material." However, he praised "Where Lies My Tarp?" and "I Hope You Wish You’d Die".

=== Track listing ===
Other Songs & Destroyed Versions track listing
No.	Title	Length
1.	"Where Lies My Tarp?"	3:48
2.	"I Felt My Size" (acoustic)	1:52
3.	"I Hope You Wish You'd Die"	2:18
4.	"I'm Like You, Tree"	1:14
5.	"The Glow pt. 2 (sequel)"	1:47
6.	"We're Here to Listen"	3:27
7.	"Sleepy Hollow"	1:19
8.	"Lanterns" (version)	2:06
9.	"Map/Moon" (version)	1:31
10.	"The Glow Pt. 2" (version)	6:12
11.	"I Want the Wind to Blow" (backwards)	4:18
12.	"Instrumental" (version)	0:25
13.	"The Moon" (version)	3:46
14.	"Samurai Sword" (version)	1:25
15.	"The Gleam pt. 2" (version)	2:36
16.	"My Roots Are Strong and Deep" (version)	0:23
17.	"I Felt My Size" (version)	1:26
18.	"My Warm Blood" (humming)	0:22
19.	"You'll Be in the Air" (version)	0:59
20.	"The Mooooooon" (version)	1:54
Total length:		43:08

== Personnel ==
Credits are adapted from The Glow Pt. 2 liner notes, AllMusic, and the stems available as part of the Microphones' Completely Everything box set.

- Phil Elverum – guitar, vocals, most instruments
- Karl Blau – engineer, alto saxophone (3)
- Khaela Maricich – engineer, vocals (12, 16)
- Kyle Field – engineer, vocals (12)
- Jacob Navarro – engineer
- Eddy Blau – engineer
- Dave Matthies – engineer
- Nate Ashley – engineer
- Jenn-Kliese – engineer
- John Golden – mastering
- Leo Visser – artwork

== Release history ==
Release dates and formats for "The Glow Pt. 2"
Region	Date	Format	Label(s)	Ref.
United States	September 11, 2001	CD/LP	K Records; P. W . Elverum & Sun, Ltd.	
United States	2007	Deluxe double CD	K Records; P. W . Elverum & Sun, Ltd.	
United States	April 4, 2008	Deluxe double CD	K Records; P. W . Elverum & Sun, Ltd.	
United States	July 9, 2013	Double LP	K Records; P. W . Elverum & Sun, Ltd.	
Japan	April 15, 2017	CD	7e.p.; P. W . Elverum & Sun, Ltd.	
