= Microphones in 2020 =

Studio album by the Microphones
- Released: August 7, 2020
- Recorded: May 2019 – May 2020
- Genres: Indie folk; indie rock; avant-folk
- Length: 44:44
- Labels: P. W. Elverum & Sun, Ltd.

The Microphones chronology
Mount Eerie (2003)	Microphones in 2020 (2020)

Microphones in 2020 is the fifth and final studio album by American indie folk and indie rock band the Microphones. It is a concept album consisting of one 44-minute song about frontman Phil Elverum's life and musical career. Elverum began the Microphones in 1996, releasing four studio albums before retiring the moniker in 2003. He instead opted to release his music under Mount Eerie as he felt the themes had changed. After performing a show under the Microphones name in 2019, the attention it received motivated Elverum to return to the project.

Microphones in 2020 was recorded between May 2019 and May 2020, and released on August 7, 2020, on Elverum's record label P.W. Elverum & Sun. Solely written and performed by Elverum, it is the Microphones' first release in 17 years. Critics described the album as indie folk, indie rock, and avant-folk, and prominent lyrical themes include nostalgia, meaning, and change. Its release was accompanied by a short film consisting of 761 printed photos taken by Elverum, which he described as "lyric video...a slideshow, a PowerPoint presentation, a flip book and a documentary".

The album received widespread critical acclaim, and was given a score of 87/100 from review aggregator Metacritic based on seven critic reviews. The album reached #88 on the Top 100 Australian Albums (ARIA) chart and was placed on many year-end lists from music publications.

== Background and inspiration ==
"The point of this song was sort of: Here I am right now in 2020. I am currently all of those things. I am still that embarrassing stuff and the good stuff and everything has happened...I really tried to paint a picture of what ingredients made up...the Microphones period".

— Phil Elverum

The American musician Phil Elverum began the Microphones in 1996, acting as the frontman and principal songwriter. The band released four studio albums between 1996 and 2003, including Don't Wake Me Up (1999), which gave the band a small following, and The Glow Pt. 2 (2001), which went on to become a critically acclaimed cult classic. After the release of 2003's Mount Eerie, Elverum ended the Microphones and opted to release his music under the name Mount Eerie instead, as the themes of his music had changed.

In 2018, Elverum spent nine months in Brooklyn, United States, where he didn't write any music except for the two-chord guitar ostinato that would later serve as the basis of Microphones in 2020. After performing a show under the Microphones name in 2019, the attention it received led him to question his past identity, giving him inspiration to return to the project. Microphones in 2020 was conceived with Elverum "walking around with it in [his] head and mumbling to [himself]". He began creating lyrics intending to encapsulate "whoever [he] was during" his past years. After refining the lyrics to only what was necessary, he transcribed them to a notebook. He connected the pages with tape to create a singular scroll, which was about 9 feet (3 m) by the end. The album was recorded between May 2019 and May 2020.

Elverum explained he released the album under his old moniker as a self-imposed writing assignment. He wanted the album to be a "project of demystification" which prodded at the feeling and history of the Microphones, but was long-lasting and not hindered by nostalgia. Rather than answer questions, Elverum intended for the project to reflect on his life and simply express what "made [him] who [he] was then".

== Music and lyrics ==
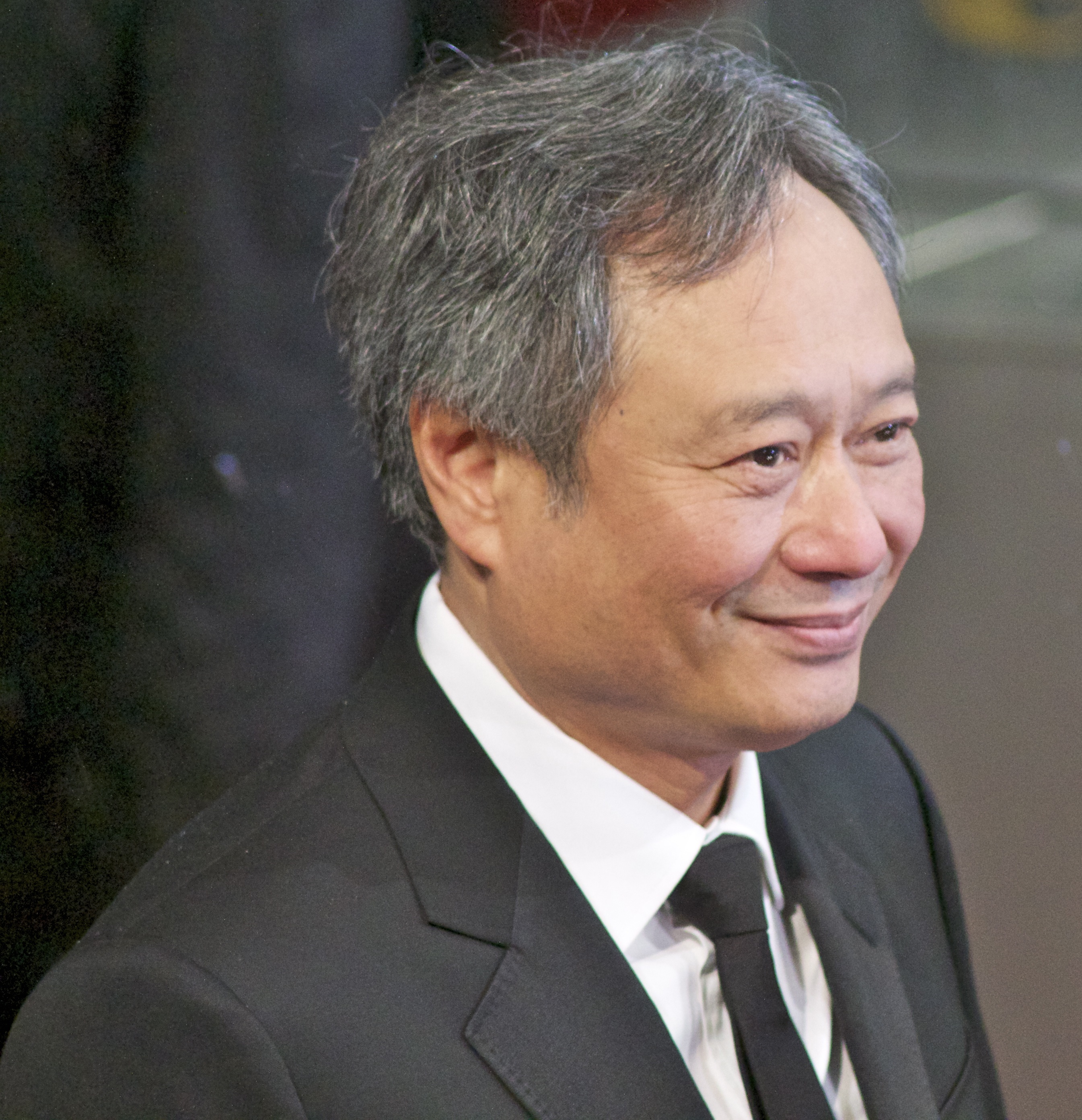
Ang Lee's (pictured in 2013) 2000 film Crouching Tiger, Hidden Dragon was referenced in the album as a pivotal moment in Elverum's musical development which transitioned his music into "Something more transcendent".

Microphones in 2020 is a concept album that consists of a single 44-minute song. It has been described as indie folk, indie rock, ambient folk, and avant-folk. According to Stereogum's Chris DeVille, the album "defies categorization".

It begins with a seven-minute instrumental section composed of two double-tracked and out of phase chords—D major and F sharp minor—played on an acoustic guitar. This guitar technique was used in earlier works, for example "The Pull" in 2000, and Elverum considers it important to the band's sound. Elverum explained that his reasoning for the intro's length was "wanting to push up against the edges, similar to extreme drone music, the way that it wears down at your sense of time and reality and makes you forget yourself", as well as symbolically representing the time between Mount Eerie and Microphones in 2020. After the introduction, more instruments are introduced: speak-singing, minimal drums, bass, organ, electric guitar (which at times appears abruptly), and piano (which slowly crescendos). At times, the guitar ostinato gives way to other textures: distorted instruments and amp hiss. The transition to distortion is placed during the line "I decided I would try to make music that contained this deeper peace / Buried underneath distorted bass". Vocal harmonies are sparsely used, and appear in the last few minutes of the song.

The album is an autobiographical account of Elverum's life and musical career, delving into the multiple past and present versions of himself. His autobiographical journey is non-linear and skips around time. He discusses many significant moments from his musical career, such as the beginnings of the Microphones, watching the film Crouching Tiger, Hidden Dragon, viewing performances by Stereolab and Bonnie "Prince" Billy, and listening to "Freezing Moon" by Mayhem. Another topic is nature, and how it influenced Elverum's youth. The album also describes many trivial experiences that were more significant due to Elverum's youth, such as contemplating the moon or doing dishes. There are many self-referential lyrics that point to themes and motifs from Elverum's other works, for example "When I took my shirt off in the yard I meant it, and it’s still off."

== Themes ==
Critical analysis has distinguished a number of themes in the album. The questions Elverum had from the 2019 show performing after returning to the Microphones name are featured and explored in the album. Meaning and Elverum's search for it are prevalent themes in the album, and appear across Elverum's discography. Elverum compares himself to his youth, observing that he is still unsatisfied in his search for meaning: "I never used to think I'd still be sitting here at 41 / Trying to breathe calmly through the waves..." Observing change is another central theme, with Elverum using nature to demonstrate the passage of time. For example, this is seen in the lyric "It was raining so hard ... I watched the dunes migrate slowly".

Nostalgia is a prominent theme, with the song exploring both Elverum's and his fans' experiences, and questioning whether it is a positive influence. The concepts of mortality and existence are also used—"At any moment we could die"—but they are approached without fear. Other themes include process, form, identity, impermanence, and uncertainty, with the latter two themes, according to Elverum, inspired by "The trauma and mess of the last five or so years of my life". When it was suggested that the album is a postmodern entity, Elverum stated, "Yeah well I feel it is its own weird thing, I guess. [...] I think of it more as an audiobook or something. It's like this big chunk thing that you can listen to if you want to sit down and devote some time to it."

== Release ==
The album was announced on June 16, 2020, and released on August 7. The cover artwork is a 1999 photo, taken by Mirah in New Mexico, United States. The album received interest from fans and music publications due to it being released under "the Microphones" instead of "Mount Eerie", which surprised Elverum, who had expected the song's length to bring attention. The album was intentionally not released on Spotify as a form of protest against its business model.

=== Short film and book ===
On August 6, a short film was released to correspond with the release of the album. Distinct from traditional music videos, Elverum described it as a "lyric video", as well as "a slideshow, a PowerPoint presentation, a flip book and a documentary". It consists of 761 printed photos which are synchronized to the album's lyrics; at times, the video shows the people, concepts, or places discussed in the lyrics. It took Elverum three weeks to produce.

On December 25, Elverum released the photobook Microphones in 2020 Silent Version, composed of images from the short film. He created the book because he wanted the photos to be appreciated in a manner that the video did not allow. Conor Williams of Interview compared the film to Hollis Frampton's Nostalgia. He also commented on Elverum appearing as a "ghost" in the photos (something Elverum deliberately intended). Pitchfork's Sam Sodomsky wrote that the photos added "bittersweet visual cues".

== Reception ==
Professional ratings
Aggregate scores
Source	Rating
AnyDecentMusic?	8.3/10
Metacritic	87/100
Review scores
Source	Rating
AllMusic	4/5 stars
Crack	9/10
Exclaim!	9/10
Mojo	4/5 stars
Our Culture Mag	4/5 stars
Paste	8.9/10
The Philadelphia Inquirer	3/4 stars
Pitchfork	8.5/10
PopMatters	9/10
Sputnikmusic	4.5/5

According to the review aggregator Metacritic, Microphones in 2020 received "universal acclaim" based on a weighted average score of 87 out of 100 from seven critic scores. AnyDecentMusic? summarized the critical consensus as an 8.3 out of 10, aggregating nine reviews.

Chris DeVille of Stereogum praised the album, writing "Microphones in 2020 affirms the value of sifting through the past from time to time, so long as you spring forward. It works so well not because it tears down those old foundations, but because it builds so beautifully upon them." The site listed it as the album of the week. A brief review in Mojo gave it four out of five stars, calling it "intimate" and "absorbing". Matt Bobkin of Exclaim! gave the album nine out of ten. Bobkin contextualized the release in Elverum's career arc as well as the sociopolitical climate in which it was released, summing it up as "Elverum's indelible stamp of style, distilled into a single track that flows like waves in the ocean or hills on the mountainside".

Clare Martin of Paste praised the introspective lyrics and delicate instrumentation, concluding, "an engrossing one-track album is no easy feat, but he draws us in with expertly rich, layered lyricism and immersive production". Quinn Moreland of Pitchfork rated the release 8.5 out of 10, giving it the site's "Best New Music" accolade. Moreland's review highlights the power of the album's lyrics and their ability to evoke mystery and memory. Konstantinos Pappis of Our Culture Mag gave the album four out of five stars, writing about the unique experience of the long song and its ability to evoke memories. Steve Kling of The Philadelphia Inquirer gave the release three out of four stars, comparing it to a good memoir as "it's intensely personal while glimpsing universal truths (and avoiding solipsism)". The album received 4.5 out of 5 points from Sowing of Sputnikmusic, who described it as a "resounding success".

=== Accolades ===
Microphones in 2020 on year-end lists
Publication	List	Rank	Ref.
AllMusic	Top 100	—N/a	
Beats Per Minute	Top 50	6	
BrooklynVegan	Top 55	34	
Crack	Top 50	30	
Exclaim!	Top 50	25	
Loud and Quiet	Top 40	23	
Magnet	Top 25	14	
No Ripcord	Top 50	22	
Paste	Top 50	26	
Pitchfork	Top 50	13	
PopMatters	Top 60	37	
PopMatters	Top 20 (Folk)	5	
Slant	Top 50	36	
Sputnikmusic	Top 50	2	
Stereogum	Top 50	31	
Under the Radar	Top 100	54	

== Track listing ==
1. "Microphones in 2020" – 44:44

== Personnel ==
Adapted from the album's liner notes.

- Phil Elverum – music
- John Golden – mastering
- Jimi Sharp – photography
- Mirah Y. T. Zeitlyn – photography

== Charts ==
Chart performance for Microphones in 2020
Chart (2020)	Peak position
Australian Albums (ARIA)	88
