= Don't Wake Me Up (album) =

- Cover for the CD release

Studio album by the Microphones
- Released: August 24, 1999
- Recorded: April 25, 1998 – March 1, 1999
- Studio: Dub Narcotic (Olympia, Wash.); The Business (Anacortes, Wash.)
- Genre: Lo-fi rock; indie rock; noise rock
- Length: 39:32
- Label: K Records (KLP 099); P.W. Elverum & Sun (ELV 028)

The Microphones chronology
Tests (1998)	Don't Wake Me Up (1999)	Window (2000)

Don't Wake Me Up is the debut studio album by American musical project the Microphones. It was released by K Records on August 24, 1999, and reissued on vinyl via P.W. Elverum & Sun on April 16, 2013. The album was recorded between April 25, 1998, and March 1, 1999, in studios in Olympia and Anacortes, Washington.

Don't Wake Me Up is a lo-fi rock and indie rock album that uses metaphorical and sometimes cryptic lyricism. The album also includes field recordings, as well as elements of pop and noise rock. It received positive reviews from AllMusic, Pitchfork, and Sputnikmusic. Don't Wake Me Up gave Phil Elverum a small following, and "set a new precedent" for K Records, due to Elverum's production being perceived as high-quality despite recording limitations.

== Background ==
After gaining presence in Anacortes, Washington's independent music scene, Phil Elverum joined the band D+, comprised of himself, Karl Blau, and Bret Lunsford at the time of his joining. He became associated with K Records with the release of D+'s debut album. After Elverum toured with D+, K Records founder Calvin Johnson gave Elverum access to the Dub Narcotic Studio, where he experimented with recording; Elverum lacked concern for the studio's modest equipment. Elverum began the Microphones initially as a solo project, releasing cassette tapes of tests and experiments.

== Recording and composition ==
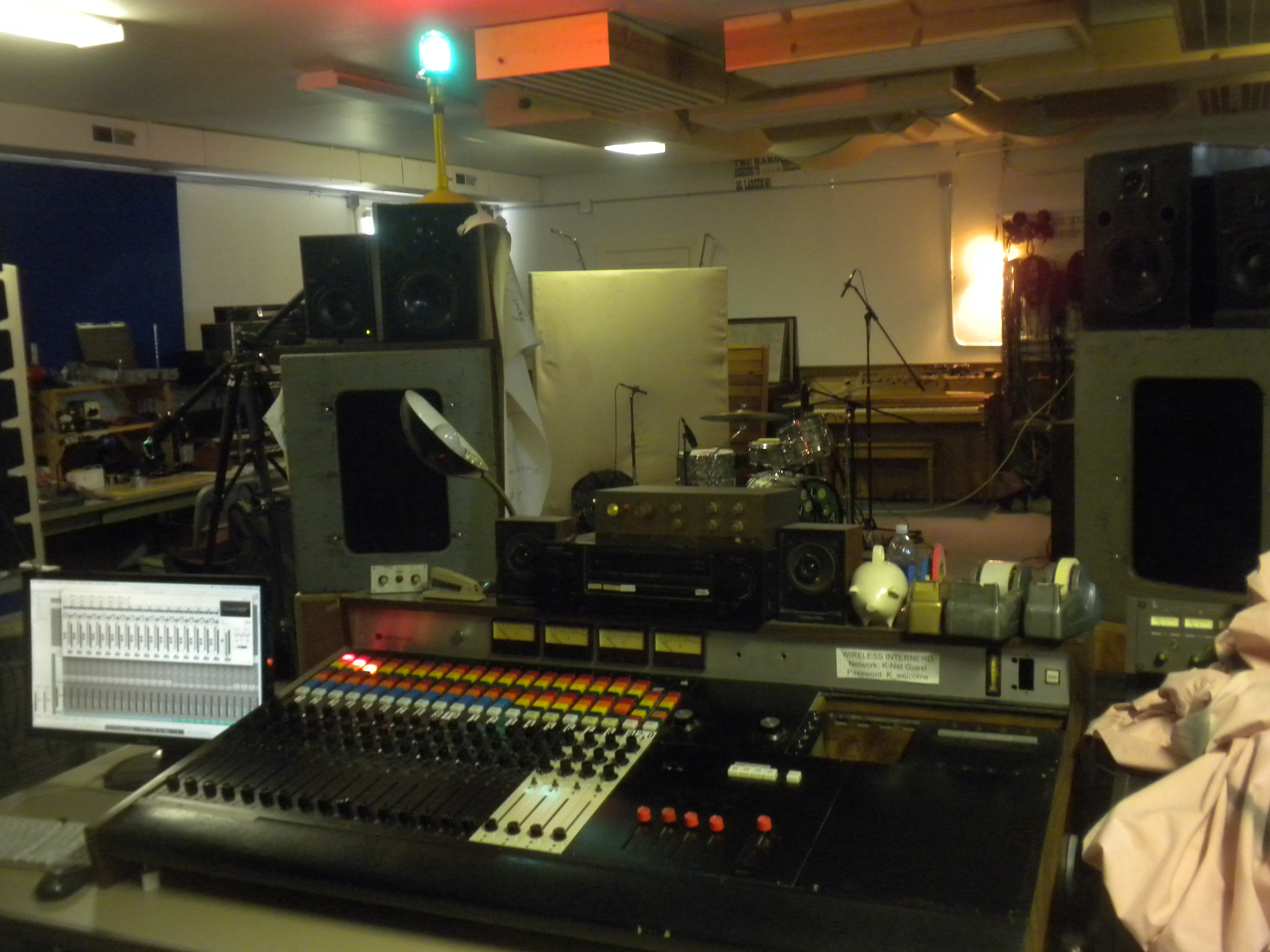
Dub Narcotic Studio in Olympia, Washington, where the album was partially recorded.

Don't Wake Me Up was recorded between April 25, 1998, and March 1, 1999, in Dub Narcotic Studio in Olympia, Washington, and the Business in Anacortes, Washington. The album was primarily written and composed by Elverum. The studios in which Don't Wake Me Up was recorded lacked high-fidelity recording equipment. Johnson said, "[Elverum] didn't have the attitude that this wasn't a real studio. He was more like, 'Hey, this is fun.'" Elverum described the studio as a "huge empty warehouse".

Elverum was 21 at the time of the album's release, and 20 during its recording. During an interview with Impose, he said that "much of [the album] was recorded [...] at the same place where I did my high school recording experiments, so it was still very connected to adolescence." The album was partially recorded in Elverum's hometown, Anacortes, Washington, although he was living in Olympia, at the time of recording. As he described, he had "newly moved away from home for the first time". Elverum stated he recorded the album "living nocturnally ... [d]rinking pots of black tea all night" to stay up.

== Music and lyrics ==
"What might first have appeared scattered or sloppy in execution eventually revealed an artist developing a tone that embraced the juxtaposition of harmony and dissonance".

— Eric Hill of Exclaim!

Don't Wake Me Up has been described primarily as a lo-fi rock and indie rock album, which includes elements of pop, and noise rock. Ryan Schreiber of Pitchfork called the mix of genres an "incredible balance" between noise rock and ambience, combining to become "distinctly indie rock". Nitsuh Abebe of AllMusic wrote, "Don't Wake Me Up moves between gritty lo-fi rock and droning, spacy constructions; a delicate pop melodicism lies beneath the surface noise of both".

According to AsleepInTheBack of Sputnikmusic, the album's lyrics portray "various universal human experiences", told mostly using metaphors and quasi-stories. Many lines in the album are cryptic, although themes are recognizable; AsleepInTheBack wrote, "whilst general themes seep through his elusive ramblings, it's hard to feel confident that one has truly grasped the precise messages Phil wishes to convey."

The opener, "Ocean 1, 2, 3", begins with a field recording of waves, which are replaced by vocal harmonies and crescendo of bass and keyboards. Then—described by Ryan Schreiber of Pitchfork as "when you least expect it"—a section of lo-fi rock continues until the song's end. "Florida Beach" uses a short snippet of "Good Vibrations" by the Beach Boys. "Here with Summer" uses the Mellotron, which Schreiber called "relaxed" and "sighing". The track transitions into "Where It's Hotter (Part 3)". Both tracks use organs and layered vocals; their textures are "dense", but not "claustrophobic", according to AsleepInTheBack.

== Legacy ==
The release of Don't Wake Me Up gave Phil Elverum a small following, and according to Ian Gormely of Exclaim!, was the "first time Elverum [was] able to connect with an audience". According to Love Rock Revolution by Mark Baumgarten, the release of the album "set a new precedent for [‍K Records‍]" since Elverum's production was perceived as high-quality despite the studio's recording limitations. Baumgarten wrote that Don't Wake Me up was "praised for its production rather than accepted despite it". The album gave K Records a greater trust in Elverum's musical abilities.

== Critical reception ==
Professional ratings
Review scores
Source	Rating
AllMusic	4/5 stars
Pitchfork	8.2/10
Sputnikmusic	4.0/5

Don't Wake Me Up received positive reviews from AllMusic, Pitchfork, and Sputnikmusic.

Nitsuh Abebe of AllMusic praised its composition and textures. Abebe compared the album's sound to Stereolab's Transient Random-Noise Bursts with Announcements and Grandaddy's early music, and Elverum's vocals to His Name Is Alive.

Ryan Schreiber of Pitchfork, who gave the album 8.2 out of 10, praised the album's pop culture references, "muddy production" and lack of high fidelity. Schreiber also praised the album's cohesiveness: "its 15 tracks blend seamlessly together, creating a whole vision instead of just compiling a handful of pop songs".

In AsleepInTheBack's 2017 review for Sputnikmusic, they rated the album 4.0 out of 5. They described the album as containing a "loose patchwork of sounds and textures" which invoke isolation. AsleepInTheBack called the album a "journey," since according to them, like other art, the album's underlying meanings are difficult to interpret.

== Track listing ==
1. "Ocean 1, 2, 3" – 2:59
2. "Florida Beach" – 2:17
3. "Here with Summer" – 3:59
4. "Where It's Hotter Pt. 3" – 2:58
5. "I'm Getting Cold" – 1:20
6. "I'll Be in the Air" – 2:25
7. "Tonight There'll Be Clouds" – 4:04
8. "You Were in the Air" – 3:20
9. "What Happened to You?" – 2:25
10. "It Wouldn't" – 2:23
11. "I'm in Hell" – 2:02
12. "Don't Wake Me Up" – 3:13
13. "Sweetheart Sleep Tight" – 2:15
14. "Instrumental" – 1:53
15. "I Felt You" – 2:01

== Personnel ==
Adapted from the album's liner notes.

- Phil Elverum – Recording, composition
- Mirah – Additional vocals
- Khaela Maricich – Additional vocals
- Bronwyn Holm – Additional vocals
- Calvin Johnson – Additional vocals

== Release history ==
Release dates and formats for Don't Wake Me Up
Region	Date	Format	Label	Catalog num.
United States	August 24, 1999	LP, CD	K Records	KLP099
United States	April 16, 2013	LP (reissue)	P.W. Elverum & Sun	ELV028
