= Karl Blau =

American musician

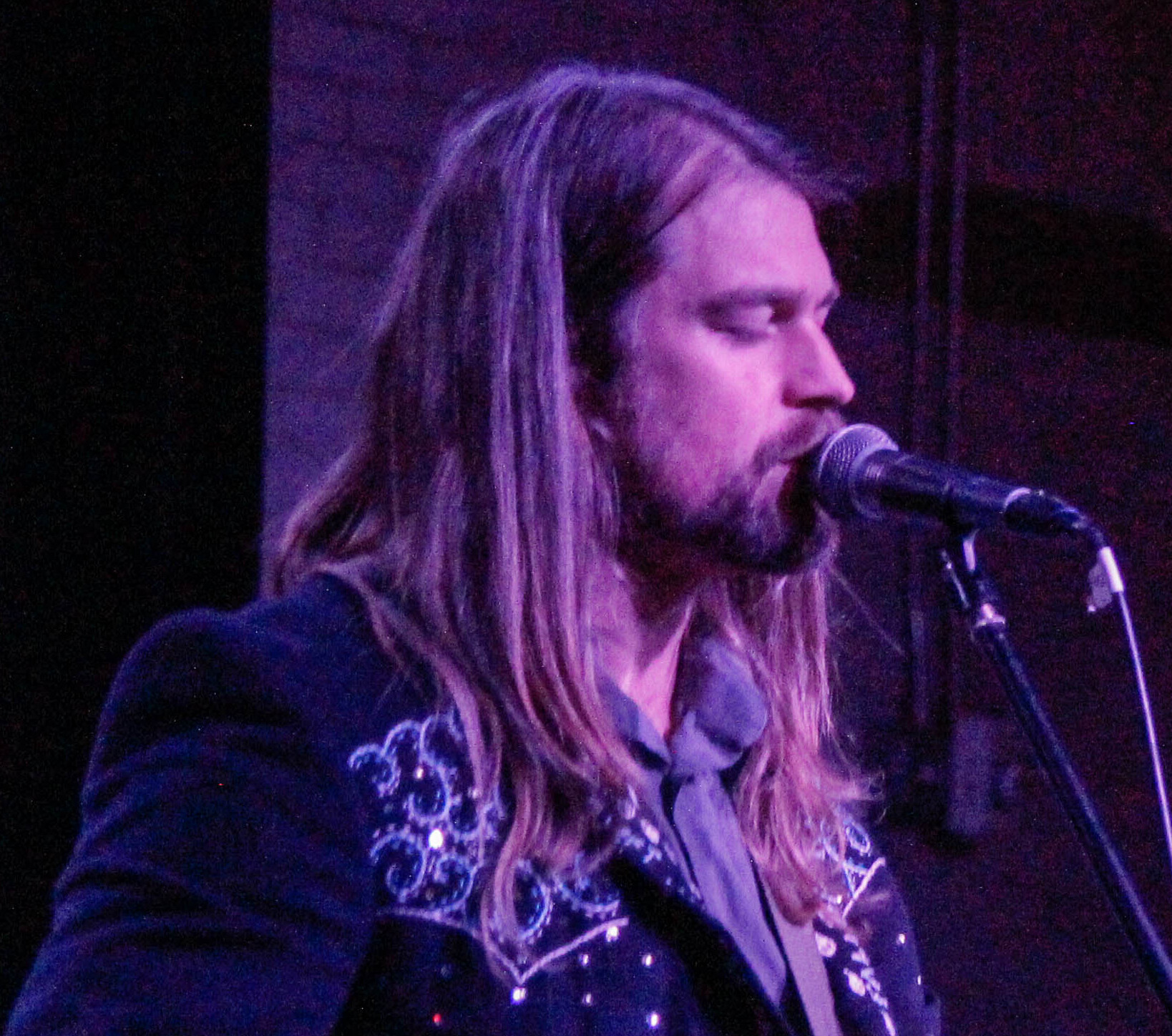
- Blau in 2017

Background information
- Origin: Anacortes, Washington, United States
- Genres: Indie rock; country
- Occupations: Singer-songwriter; multi-instrumentalist; record producer
- Instruments: Vocals; guitar; bass guitar; drums; keyboards; saxophone
- Years active: 1996–present
- Labels: Bella Union; Knw-Yr-Own; K Records; Kelp Monthly; Marriage Records
- Website: karlblau.com

Karl Blau is an American indie rock and country vocalist, producer, songwriter, and multi-instrumentalist based in Philadelphia, Pennsylvania, previously based in Anacortes, Washington for over two decades. A member of the Knw-Yr-Own/K Records collective, he is known for his musical output, live shows, and self recording and distribution. According to AllMusic, "Blau's sounds include grafting folk and country-rock onto hazy blues, rocksteady reggae, '70s soul harmonies, and ceremonial-sounding flutes, bossa nova, dub, and experimental drone in an unpredictable, shape-shifting mixture of elements."

== Career ==
Blau grew up on Samish Island, Washington, a peninsula across the bay from Anacortes (where he later came to be based). In the 1990s, Blau worked at The Business record store in Anacortes. His solo career began in 1996 with the release of the cassettes Doin' Things the Way They Happen and Blue Nomad on Knw-Yr-Own Records. Shell Collection came out the next year.

Blau has played in several bands over the years, such as the Microphones, D+, Brothers Blau, Lovers Without Borders, Captain Fathom and Your Heart Breaks. He also has collaborated extensively with other Washington-based musicians, including Phil Elvrum of The Microphones and Mount Eerie, LAKE and Earth. In addition, he has toured and recorded with Laura Veirs.

In 2003, Blau began a service called Kelp! Monthly, via which he released a series of records and mailed them to subscribers. The releases came out often, but not necessarily monthly. By 2008, it had been renamed to the Kelp Lunacy Advanced Plagiarism Society (KLAPS) as new releases were not being made with enough regularity to justify the original name. KLAPS contains a total of 32 issues (see list below).

Blau was referenced in a song carrying his name by the London punk band Video Nasties. The Microphones' album, It Was Hot, We Stayed in the Water, also has a song titled "Karl Blau".

== Discography ==
=== LPs ===
- Doin' Things the Way They Happen (Knw-Yr-Own 1996)
- Blue Nomad (Knw-Yr-Own 1996)
- Shell Collection (Knw-Yr-Own 1997)
- A Second Culling (Knw-Yr-Own 1999)
- Clothes Your I's (Knw-Yr-Own 2001)
- Beneath Waves (K Records 2006)
- Dance Positive (Marriage Records 2007)
- AM (Whistler 2008)
- Nature's Got Away (K Records 2008)
- Zebra (K Records 2009)
- Introducing Karl Blau (Raven Marching Band/Bella Union 2016)
- Out Her Space (Bella Union 2017)
- Scream Time (Self-released 2022)
- Vultures of Love (Otherly Love 2024)

=== Singles ===
- "Slow Down Joe" b/w "Lake King's Daughter" (K Records/OnPurpose Records 2006)
- "That's How I Got To Memphis" b/w "Forest" (collaboration with Mount Analog) (K Records)

== Kelp Lunacy Advanced Plagiarism Society series ==
Kelp Lunacy Advanced Plagiarism Society (KLAPS, formerly Kelp! Monthly) was Blau's "monthly (sometimes) music service" that had released a series of records. The following is a list of all releases:

1. Dark, Magic Sea
2. The Coconutcracker
3. Turning Tutu, Turning Leaves
4. Dunkel Blau
5. Purple Heart
6. Deep Sandwich
7. Remember Tomorrow
8. Lore of Ears
9. Dubble Dooty Booty
10. Trust in Sirens
11. It Was Hot, We Stayed in the Water
12. Welsh Phantoms and Other Ghosts of Western Europe
13. Sea/Saw
14. Stereoearrings
15. If I Knew Zen What I Know Now
16. AM
17. Sing Together/Lonely Under the Covers
18. Beer & Chai
19. Flotsam & Jetsam
20. Let It All Out
21. Sigh Lens
22. Bread-n-Grease
23. Trunkal Howl
24. LAKE
25. Free The Bird
26. Dance Positive
27. Good Lovin' County
28. In Return From Ghost Country
29. Baby Nettles
30. 96
31. Questions For Moon
32. Songles
