= The Microphones =

American indie rock project

- The Microphones performing live

Background information
- Origin: Olympia, Washington, U.S.
- Genres: Indie rock; indie folk; avant-folk; experimental; noise rock; slacker rock
- Years active: 1996–2003; 2007; 2019–2022
- Labels: P.W. Elverum & Sun; KNW-YR-OWN; Elsinor; K; Yoyo
- Past members: Phil Elverum

The Microphones (often stylized as the Microphones) were an American indie folk, indie rock, and experimental project from Olympia, Washington. The project was founded in 1996 and ended in 2003, with a short reunion following in 2007 and revivals in 2019 and 2020-22. Across every iteration of the Microphones, the band's only permanent member was Phil Elverum. Elverum is the principal songwriter and producer behind the band's albums, but a rotating cast of several other musicians feature on his recordings and tours. Many of Elverum's recordings from the project's initial period were released by the label K Records.

Since 2003, Elverum has recorded and performed primarily under the name Mount Eerie. He played a one-off concert in Anacortes, WA under the name the Microphones in June 2019 and announced the release of the fifth and final Microphones album, Microphones in 2020, in August 2020. This was followed by a limited run of tour dates in 2021 and 2022 to play the album live before disbanding again.

== History ==
=== Early years ===
Phil Elverum became involved in the Washington music scene while working at the Business, a record store in his home town of Anacortes, in the mid-1990s. Elverum began experimenting with recording equipment in the back of the store, which led to the store's owner Bret Lunsford releasing two cassettes (Microphone and Wires and Cords) on his label, KNW-YR-OWN. Elverum also played drums in Lunsford's band, D+, before moving to Olympia in 1997 to attend Evergreen State College.

While in Olympia, Elverum caught the attention of K Records owner and musician Calvin Johnson. After recording for some time at the Dub Narcotic studios, Elverum was able to complete his first full-length album, a CD entitled Tests, which was released in 1998 on Elsinor Records. Tests combined songs from his earlier cassette releases and the recently recorded Dub Narcotic recordings. At the same time, Elverum released his first 7" single, "Bass Drum Dream" on Up Records.

=== K Records years ===
Elverum slowly gained recognition as a talented producer and recording engineer in the studio. While helping, often anonymously, with many of the area's artists, he began work on his second full-length, Don't Wake Me Up, released on K Records in 1999. Elverum toured for a few months following the release with fellow K Records artist Mirah, and, showcasing his talents on the road, was able to build a small but loyal fanbase and gain appreciation in the indie music scene. While performing in another K Records band, Old Time Relijun, Elverum began recording It Was Hot, We Stayed in the Water. Released on K Records in 2000, the album was Elverum's most ambitious yet, featuring layers of harmonic guitars, noise, and Beach Boys-esque harmonies.

Elverum's next release, The Glow Pt. 2, was released by K Records in 2001. It was noted by critics for its production and songwriting. Generally considered his best-known album, it explored personal themes about lost loves and childhood memories. Pitchfork Media named The Glow Pt. 2 as the top album of 2001, and #73 on their 200 Top Albums of the 2000s. Tiny Mix Tapes named it the 5th best album of the 2000s.

After a tour of Europe and North America known as the "Paper Opera Tour", Elverum returned to Dub Narcotic to begin work on his follow-up to The Glow Pt. 2. Released by K Records in 2003, Mount Eerie was named after the mountain on Fidalgo Island where Elverum spent much of his childhood. Containing five long songs, the album features a narrative arc, in which Elverum dies, is eaten by vultures, and discovers the face of the Universe. It represents a turning point and a realization period in Elverum's life. Like its predecessor, Mount Eerie was also praised by critics for its ambitious and imaginative production.

=== Dissolution ===
Elverum toured North America and Europe again in 2002, playing mostly solo shows (billed as the "I Will Move Away Forever and Never Come Back Ever" tour) before settling in Finnkonevika, Kjerringøy, Norway, where he spent the winter living in a log cabin. In February 2003, he toured Japan with Calvin Johnson, Kyle Field, and the Tokyo band Moools, which resulted in the album Live in Japan. Live In Japan was released by K Records in early 2004, by which time Elverum had already begun to perform shows under the name Mount Eerie.

=== Subsequent Microphones releases and performances ===
In January 2007, a one-off 7" single was released under the Microphones moniker, titled Two Songs by the Microphones. In 2008, The Glow Pt. 2 was reissued by K Records with an additional disc of outtakes and rarities. In March 2011, Elv(e)rum re-recorded the Microphones' song "I Lost My Wind" for the compilation Collaborate With a 1940s Wire Recorder. In 2013, the Microphones' four studio albums (in addition to the singles compilation Song Islands) were remastered and reissued on Elverum's own label, P.W. Elverum & Sun, Ltd. In 2016, a compilation of the Microphones' early cassette releases was released as Early Tapes: 1996–1998.

Elverum played a one-off concert in Anacortes, WA under the name the Microphones in June 2019, performing alongside D+, Black Belt Eagle Scout, and Little Wings.

On August 7, 2020, Elverum released a new Microphones album: Microphones in 2020. The album consists of a 44:44 single song about Elverum's own life and search of meaning.

On January 13, 2022, Elverum announced a comprehensive retrospective box set, Completely Everything, 1996–2021 which contains the entire Microphones discography; Elverum also stated that it would be the final release from the Microphones.

On September 11, 2026, Elverum performed The Glow, Pt. 2 in its entirety at a show in Seattle in honor of the album's 25th anniversary.

== Style ==
According to Kyle Cochrun of PopMatters "The band shirked traditional song structures, buried melodies under dissonance, added or abandoned the rhythm section at unexpected moments, caked guitar distortion on soft-spoken campfire jingles, relished in a decidedly scattershot soundscape, and dismantled any forward momentum they worked to build". They are broadly categorized as indie rock, but their music includes influence from noise music and folk along with psychedelic rock and pop. It is also characterized by its more “DIY” and lo-fi sound. Elverum has mentioned grunge, Eric's Trip, The Beach Boys, and Phil Spector's Wall of Sound technique as being influential to the sound of The Microphones, specifically to It Was Hot, We Stayed In The Water. He described his writing style as being more narrative and human in comparison to his work as Mount Eerie, drawing inspiration from the writing style of Will Oldham of Palace Music and nature.

== Discography ==
=== Studio albums ===
- Don't Wake Me Up (1999)
- It Was Hot, We Stayed in the Water (2000)
- The Glow Pt. 2 (2001)
- Mount Eerie (2003)
- Microphones in 2020 (2020)

=== Extended Plays ===
- Window (2000)
- The Singing from Mt. Eerie (2003)
- The Drums from Mt. Eerie (2003)
