= SK-1 =

SK-1 or SK1 may refer to:

- Casio SK-1, a small sampling keyboard
- Garant 30k SK-1, an East German armored vehicle
- Hammond SK1, a modern keyboard
- Saskatchewan Highway 1
- SK-1 spacesuit, an early Russian spacesuit
- sK1 (program), a fork of the Skencil vector graphics editor
- Sphingosine kinase 1, a protein
- SK1 (film), a 2014 French film
- VR Class Sk1, a locomotive class
- SK_{1}, the special Whitehead group

== See also ==
- SKL (disambiguation)
- ski (disambiguation)
- SK (disambiguation)
