= Lost Wisdom =

2008 studio album by Mount Eerie

Studio album by Mount Eerie with Julie Doiron and Frederick Squire
- Released: October 7, 2008
- Recorded: Anacortes, Washington
- Genre: Indie folk, lo-fi
- Length: 24:34
- Label: P. W. Elverum & Sun (ELV 019/38)

Mount Eerie chronology
Black Wooden Ceiling Opening (2008)	Lost Wisdom (2008)	Dawn (2008)

Mount Eerie studio album chronology
"No Flashlight": Songs of the Fulfilled Night (2005)	Lost Wisdom (2008)	Dawn (2008)

Julie Doiron chronology
Woke Myself Up (2007)	Lost Wisdom (2008)	I Can Wonder What You Did with Your Day (2009)

Frederick Squire chronology
Rubber Covered Painter Must Remain Inside Exit Flange to Maintain Anti-Wicking Seal (2004)	Lost Wisdom (2008)	Daniel, Fred & Julie (2009)

Limited edition album cover

Lost Wisdom is the second studio album by Mount Eerie, with Canadian musicians Julie Doiron and Frederick Squire. It was released on October 7, 2008, on P. W. Elverum & Sun, less than a month before Elverum's next album under the Mount Eerie name, Dawn, was released, which featured songs from this album. A follow-up album, Lost Wisdom pt. 2, was released in 2019, without Frederick Squire.

== Background and recording ==
Elverum considers Doiron his favorite singer, and says recording with her was a "dream come true" for him. She was a member of Eric's Trip, an indie noise pop band from the early 1990s, and has since recorded numerous solo albums. Elverum considers Eric's Trip his favorite band of all time, and says the band is "the reason why I got into playing music". Frederick Squire is a Canadian rock singer, songwriter and guitarist. Formerly a member of Shotgun & Jaybird, he would perform under the stage name Dick Morello.

The recording of the album was somewhat spontaneous. Doiron and Squire had a few days between a recent tour and an upcoming recording session in Olympia, Washington, and made a surprise visit to Phil Elverum in Anacortes. Initially they were just recording for fun without the pretense of recording an album. Elverum eventually did ask the two to record an album, the three decided to do so and quickly recorded the album.

The album is named after the Burzum song of the same title.

== Music ==
The title track was inspired by Elverum's time spent:

Driving through northeast Oregon and Idaho alone in the middle of the night, thinking about what that Burzum song title could mean, without really even knowing the Burzum song at all. Thinking about how depressing it is that all we learn in our lives is lost and misunderstood by posterity no matter what. Also how even within our lives we quickly forget important lessons learned.

The song was written while driving at night. A different version of the song "With My Hands Out" appears on Mount Eerie's 2004 release Seven New Songs, and other tracks later appeared on Dawn, released on 1 November 2008. Though the versions found on Dawn are actually the original versions of those songs written in 2002 and recorded in 2008. The track "Voice in Headphones" on this album reprises the chorus from Björk's song "Undo", over a different verse. Elverum had previously covered Björk's "All Is Full of Love" on the 2001 Microphones album Blood.

== Release ==
Due to the impromptu nature of the recording session Elverum didn't intend to release the album. However, the album was released on October 7 on LP and CD; the vinyl version included a double-sided jumbo poster. The album was re-released in 2019 in a double CD set alongside companion album Lost Wisdom pt. 2.

== Reception ==
Professional ratings
Aggregate scores
Source	Rating
Metacritic	82/100
Review scores
Source	Rating
AllMusic	4/5 stars
Alternative Press	4.5/5 stars
Cokemachineglow	80%
Pitchfork	8.3/10
PopMatters	7/10
Tiny Mix Tapes	3/5 stars
Under the Radar	7/10

Upon release, the album received critical acclaim. At Metacritic, which assigns a normalized rating out of 100 to reviews from music critics, the album has received an average score of 82, indicating "universal acclaim", based on 8 reviews.

Heather Phares of AllMusic wrote that despite the fast time to create the album "its simplicity and immediacy sound intimate instead of tossed off" she also complimented the chemistry between Elverum and Doiron writing that "He and Doiron sound completely natural yet haunting trading verses".

== Track listing ==
All tracks are written by Phil Elverum.

No.	Title	Length
1.	"Lost Wisdom"	4:14
2.	"Voice in Headphones"	2:16
3.	"You Swan, Go On"	1:25
4.	"Who?"	2:24
5.	"Flaming Home"	2:29
6.	"What?"	2:06
7.	"If We Knew..."	1:37
8.	"With My Hands Out"	1:39
9.	"O My Heart"	3:17
10.	"Grave Robbers"	1:47
Total length:		24:34

== Personnel ==
- Phil Elverum – vocals, most instruments, recording, songwriting, and production
- Julie Doiron – harmony vocals and recording
- Frederick Squire – acoustic and electric guitar, recording
- Karl Blau – engineering

== LOST WISDOM live at Gunjyo, March 12th, 2010 ==
LOST WISDOM live at Gunjyo, March 12th, 2010

Live album by Mount Eerie
- Released: July 4, 2012
- Venue: Gunjyo, Matsumoto, Nagano, Japan
- Genre: Indie Folk
- Length: 24:56
- Label: 7e.p.

On July 4, 2012, Tokyo based label 7e.p. released a live album of Lost Wisdom in its entirety entitled LOST WISDOM live at Gunjyo, March 12th, 2010. The album was recorded at Gunjyo, Matsumoto by Koji Saito. Mastering was done by Masaki Tada. The album was released as a bonus disc for "Clear Moon / Ocean Roar".

=== Track listing ===
All tracks are written by Phil Elverum.

No.	Title	Length
1.	"Lost Wisdom"	4:10
2.	"Voice in Headphones"	2:06
3.	"You Swan, Go On"	1:34
4.	"Who?"	2:44
5.	"Flaming Home"	2:45
6.	"What?"	2:23
7.	"If We Knew..."	2:11
8.	"With My Hands Out"	2:10
9.	"O My Heart"	3:24
10.	"Grave Robbers"	1:29
Total length:		24:56
