= Seven New Songs of "Mount Eerie" =

EP by Mount Eerie
- Released: June 1, 2004
- Recorded: "Nowhere" in Anacortes, Washington, May and June 2004
- Genre: Indie rock
- Length: 25:31
- Labels: P.W. Elverum & Sun, Ltd.
- Producer: Phil Elverum

Mount Eerie chronology
Seven New Songs of "Mount Eerie" (2004)	Two New Songs of "Mount Eerie" (2004)

Seven New Songs of "Mount Eerie" is the debut EP by Mount Eerie, released on June 1, 2004.

== Recording and release ==
It was recorded in Anacortes, Washington in the months of May and June 2004 intended for the July 2004 tour of Australia. It was released on 196 CD-Rs in photocopied covers, all of which were sold out on the tour. Free audio downloads of the EP were later made available. It's been reported to have been downloaded over 36,000 times.

Several songs from the EP have later appeared on other Mount Eerie releases in different versions: "Wooly Mammoth's Absence" (retitled as "Wooly Mammoth's Mighty Absence"), "With My Hands Out" and "My Burning" were re-recorded for Dawn while "Wooly Mammoth's Mighty Absence" and "With My Hands Out" were also re-recorded for Eleven Old Songs and Lost Wisdom respectively. Another version of "Do Not Be Afraid" was released on Singers, an album credited to either Mount Eerie or the band of the same name.

== Reception ==
Professional ratings
Review scores
Source	Rating
Pitchfork Media	(7.8/10)

The album received a generally positive reception. Sam Ubl of Pitchfork wrote that "the organic, close-mic'd sound posited on that collection has been reined in by Elverum's masterful studio touch, allowing the music to retain an unaffected, live-performed spirit without ever sounding sloppy or unfinished."

== Track listing ==
All tracks are written by Phil Elverum.

No.	Title	Length
1.	"Wooly Mammoth's Absence"	4:46
2.	"Do Not Be Afraid"	0:54
3.	"With My Hands Out"	3:32
4.	"2 Blonde Braids"	3:40
5.	"My Burning"	2:41
6.	"November 22nd 2003, 4:45 PM"	6:18
7.	"Cold Mountain Song 286"	2:26
Total length:		25:31
