= Wind's Poem =

Studio album by Mount Eerie
- Released: July 14, 2009
- Recorded: February 14, 2008 – March 27, 2009
- Genre: Indie folk; dark ambient; lo-fi
- Length: 54:45
- Label: P.W. Elverum & Sun, Ltd. (ELV 020)
- Producer: Phil Elverum

Mount Eerie chronology
White Stag (2009)	Wind's Poem (2009)	Black Wooden (2009)

Mount Eerie studio album chronology
Dawn (2008)	Wind's Poem (2009)	Clear Moon (2012)

Wind's Poem is the fourth full-length album by Mount Eerie, released on July 14, 2009. Several of the tracks are inspired by black metal, and showcases Phil Elverum's "relatively newfound affinity for Xasthur and other lynchpins of the unholy genre."

== Background and composition ==
While making the album Elverum wished to move away from his usual style; creating an album about violent changes. He intended for it to be the loudest record he had made at the time but also to feature significant emotion. Elverum cites black metal as an influence for the album. At certain points on the record Elverum attempts to replicate Xasthur's Subliminal Genocide. A hill he used to live on and 1990s American drama television series Twin Peaks were also influential. Despite music publications such as Pitchfork labelling the album "black metal", Elverum has denounced the genre tag, clarifying that "It's definitely not a black metal album and the whole idea of doing kind of a kitschy genre album is so embarrassing and shallow."

Recording took place from between February 14, 2008, and March 27, 2009, at Nowhere, Anacortes, Washington with Nick Krgovich. Elverum recorded the album by adding various layers to the compositions. Elverum did not play the drums on a drum set, instead recording each drum individually on their own track. Elverum did this to allow for drum rolls on each drum simultaneously. The vocals were intentionally mixed low to encourage listeners to turn the volume up—causing the album to "[wrap] around the listener...like a dream." The album was mixed in stereo. Field recordings of wind are featured on the album. Elverum used distorted cymbals to emulate the sound of wind.

== Music ==
The theme of nature is featured throughout the album. Elverum described the central theme of the album as wind. Specifically its "destruction-and-rebirth cycle", "wind as an example of the personality that exists in dark nature" and occurrence of wind sounding like whispering. Elverum explained the central idea of Wind's Poem:

Is that this crazy beautiful force of erosion and destruction (wind) constantly wraps around the world and permeates our lives, and is occasionally audible, blowing through buildings and branches. It is an invisible river, and it sings/says poems in a mystery language. So, the counterpart to wind must be “stone”...It's about the interplay between these two things: shape vs. destroyer of shape.

Elverum incorporates many different perspectives on the album. These include the "voice of...wind", himself and a combination of them. Wind is represented on the album as “River” The symbol/character of a stone is present in the album as well. The stone serves as an inverse to the wind. The stone is intended to represent "all tangible things. My face, this building, that mountain, that flower."

Certain phrases are repeated throughout the album. The lyrics deal with "fundamental dualities." At times the lyrics are almost unintelligible due to the sound overwhelming them. Musically the album is reminiscent of his 2008 EP Black Wooden Ceiling Opening and dynamic in nature with Elverum describing it as "Quiet/loud/quiet/loud." He also noted how he "recorded two songs on the album that were loud the whole way through, but the other 10 songs are like synthetic goth-pop".

The first song on the album, "Wind's Dark Poem", features a black metal style opening. The opening consists of blast beats, layered synths and distorted guitars. Elverum wished for the album to "start at 100 percent volume. All noise at once, and then back off into song a little." He described the lyrics as "a collection of images and ideas", "that came out of me at the very beginning of the writing of this album that were kind of the seeds that the rest of the songs came from." He sings in a speaking singing manner, akin to reading a poem. Elverum described the song as a "table of contents...a bunch of noise and ideas that are a preview for what's to come. Track 0, before track 1."

"The epic lullaby", "Through The Trees" was an attempt with fellow musician Nick Krgovich to recreate "David Lynch sound-track synth music", specifically "Polish Poem" from Inland Empire. The hill mentioned in the song is a reference to a hill Elverum lived on and the experience of "watching the lives of people below and feeling different" living there gave him. The lyrics are more political than the other songs, with Elverum referencing the "land of dream", a metaphor for America. Krgovich sings alongside Elverum, however his voice is "high and distant"—intended to represent the wind. It was the first song to be recorded on February 14, 2008. It features multi-tracked vocals and bass drum. In an interview with Believer Magazine, Elverum commented that, due to the song's length, it would be more fitting as the final track rather than the second. His decision to place the song there instead was to demonstrate the album's challenging and unorthodox nature.

Krgovich also collaborated on the songs "Between Two Mysteries", "Ancient Questions", and "Stone's Ode". Elverum described their creative process as free-form, stating that

We didn't know that we were recording an album or anything. He just came down and we were doing these recording experiments, “Hey let's try this! Let's make something that feels like this other song that we like, or a culmination of these two things.”

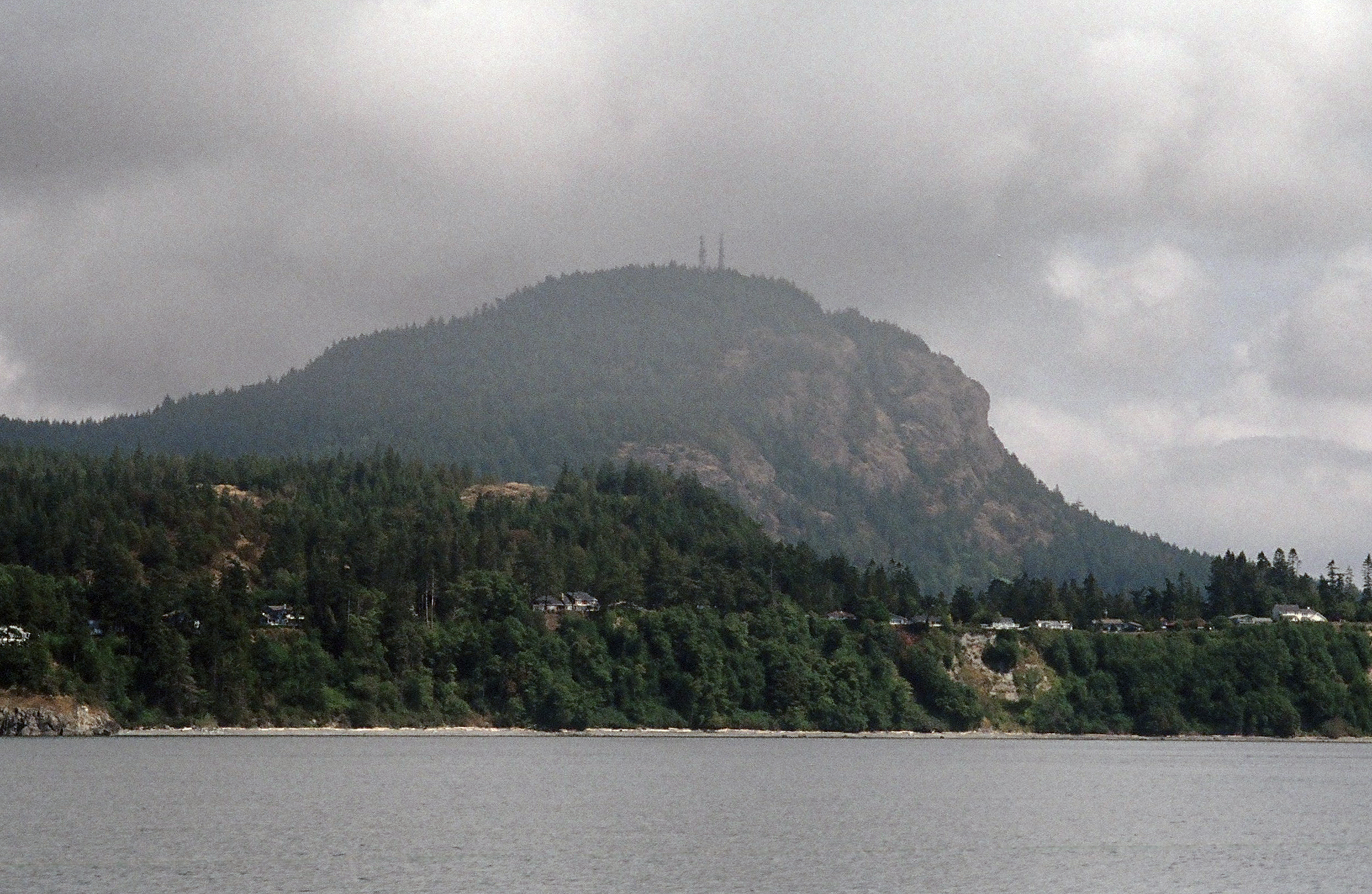
Mount Erie as seen from the water

"My Heart Is Not at Peace" features "malleted" cymbals. "The Hidden Stone" and "The Mouth of Sky" are reminiscent of the guitar riff heavy songs "I Want to Be Cold" and "Samurai Sword" from his 2001 album The Glow Pt. 2. "Summons" is more relaxed than the black metal infused songs on the album. "My Heart Is Not at Peace" and "Summons" continue the wind motif, posing it as both "destroyer" and "revealer". This is a direct reference to Percy Bysshe Shelley's poem "Ode to the West Wind" “Destroyer and preserver; hear, O hear!".

"Wind Speaks" as explained by Elverum is about "standing on Commercial Avenue, and clouds are rolling off a hill on Mount Erie, and it's windy." The lyrics concern the idea of being an embodiment of nature. "Between Two Mysteries" samples "Laura Palmer's Theme" by Angelo Badalamenti and directly references the show by name. It features palm muted electric guitars, percussion, an ascending vocal melody and synthesized strings playing the aforementioned sample.

"Ancient Questions" incorporates nihilistic lyrics, guitar picking, keyboard accompaniment and guitar sounds similar to those used on The Flaming Lips song "Thirty-Five Thousand Feet of Despair". The album's climax "Lost Wisdom pt. 2"'s opening is similar to that which opened the album.

A section of lyrics from the track "Stone's Ode" was taken from the Burzum song "Dunkelheit". The song focuses on the "world of dreams" idea introduced earlier on the album. Elverum explained that the world of dreams is a reference to the buddhist idea of existence as an illusion. The song is composed of two different movements which deal with the day and night respectively. It reuses the ascending vocal melody from "Between Two Mysteries".

== Tour ==
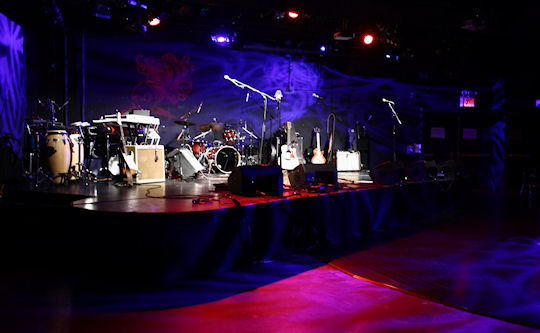
Main stage at the Le Poisson Rouge

After the release of the album, Elverum embarked on an autumn tour with Krgovich, Tara Jane O'Neil and Julia Jacklin from NO KIDS in support of the album. Elverum and O'Neil played the guitar and were accompanied by two drummers and two keyboard players.

The tour received a positive reception. Ben Ratliff in his review of the show played at the Le Poisson Rouge in Greenwich Village, New York described the show as "a recollected chronicle of awe, sung in a high, light voice, a little like Will Oldham's, but clearer and straighter, without its coils and burrs." Crawford Philleo of The Know reviewing the show played at Rhinoceropolis, Denver wrote that "Elverum and company terrorized the venue with sonic blasts of distortion so heavy the walls shook" concluding with "The set was nothing less than amazing".

== Critical reception ==
Professional ratings
Aggregate scores
Source	Rating
Metacritic	85/100
Review scores
Source	Rating
AllMusic	4/5 stars
Consequence of Sound	5/5 stars
Drowned in Sound	9/10
No Ripcord	8/10
Pitchfork	8.2/10
PopMatters	9/10
Redefine	A−
Spectrum Culture	4.0/5
Tiny Mix Tapes	4.5/5

Upon release, the album received critical acclaim. At Metacritic, which assigns a normalized rating out of 100 to reviews from music critics, the album has received an average score of 85, indicating "universal acclaim", based on 12 reviews.

== Legacy ==
Ian Gromley of Exclaim! chose the album as one of Elverum's essential albums.

== Track listing ==
All tracks are written by Phil Elverum.

No.	Title	Length
1.	"Wind's Dark Poem"	4:12
2.	"Through the Trees"	11:33
3.	"My Heart Is Not at Peace"	3:17
4.	"The Hidden Stone"	3:46
5.	"Wind Speaks"	3:46
6.	"Summons"	2:51
7.	"The Mouth of Sky"	4:46
8.	"Between Two Mysteries"	4:18
9.	"Ancient Questions"	3:24
10.	"(something)"	2:22
11.	"Lost Wisdom Pt. 2"	5:04
12.	"Stone's Ode"	5:26
Total length:		54:45
