= Pre-Human Ideas =

Compilation album by Mount Eerie
- Released: November 12, 2013
- Recorded: 2011−2013
- Genres: Electronic, experimental
- Length: 41:10
- Labels: P.W. Elverum & Sun.
- Producer: Phil Elverum

Mount Eerie chronology
| Live in Bloomington, September 30, 2011 (2013) | Pre-Human Ideas (2013) | Sauna (2015) |

Pre-Human Ideas is a compilation album released by Phil Elverum under the name Mount Eerie, on November 12, 2013. The album consists of computerised versions of songs from his 2012 releases Clear Moon and Ocean Roar, plus 2 organ excerpts from the songs "Pale Lights" and "The Place Lives" from Ocean Roar and Clear Moon respectively.

The album is a derivation from Elverum's typical sound with his vocals layered in autotune and pitched higher in some instances to resemble a female voice.

== Recording ==
Recording took place over the time span of 3 years in the recording studio Unknown in Anacortes, Washington.

== Reception ==
Professional ratings
Aggregate scores
| Source | Rating |
|---|---|
| Metacritic | 71/100 |
Review scores
| Source | Rating |
| AllMusic | 4/5 stars |
| Consequence of Sound | D |
| Exclaim! | 7/10 |
| Paste | 8.8/10 |
| Pitchfork | 7.2/10 |
| Sputnikmusic | 4/5 |
| Under The Radar | 8/10 |

The album received generally positive reviews upon release. Metacritic, which assigns a normalized rating out of 100 to reviews from music critics, the album has received an average score of 72 based on 10 critics, indicating "generally favourable reviews".

Heather Phares of AllMusic wrote that the album was "More than just musical footnotes, these reworkings add extra depth to Mount Eerie's already complex body of work". Alex Young of Consequence of Sound said of the album "Overall, it's barely more than a set of curios, which may have been better off released as a free download". Eric Hill of Exclaim! described the album as "sweet and creepy" and thinking that the experimentation, on the whole, was a success. Robert Ham of Paste wrote that the album "certainly has a welcome place in his vast and varied discography".

== Legacy ==
Eric Hill of Exclaim! Included the album in a guide to Elverum's music, however told readers to avoid it as an entry point to his discography.

== Track listing ==
| No. | Title | Length |
|---|---|---|
| 1. | "ORGANS (Pale Lights)" | 06:00 |
| 2. | "No Inside, No Out" | 01:51 |
| 3. | "I Say "No"" | 03:30 |
| 4. | "The Hidden Stone" | 02:57 |
| 5. | "The Place Lives" | 02:44 |
| 6. | "The Place I Live" | 03:49 |
| 7. | "Lone Bell" | 04:11 |
| 8. | "House Shape" | 04:21 |
| 9. | "Clear Moon" | 02:56 |
| 10. | "Yawning Sky" | 03:16 |
| 11. | "Ocean Roar" | 02:52 |
| 12. | "ORGANS (The Place Lives)" | 02:38 |

== Personnel ==
- Phil Elverum – songwriting, vocals

Production

- Timothy Stollenwerk – digital mastering
- John Golden – vinyl mastering
