= Corduroy Records =

Defunct Australian record label

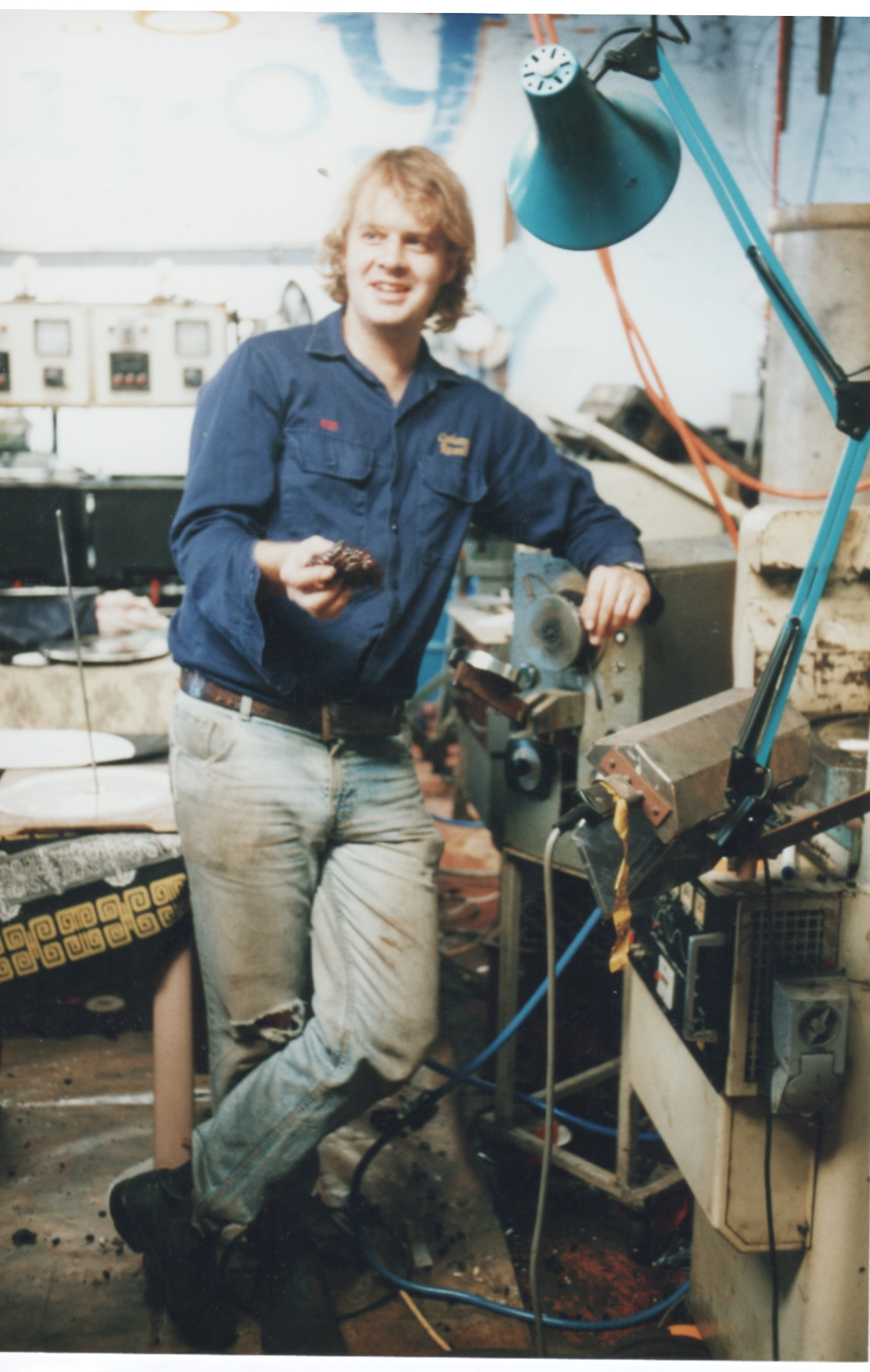
- Nick Phillips at Corduroy Records (2000)
- Founded: 1994
- Founder: Nick Phillips
- Defunct: 2005
- Headquarters: 38 Advantage Rd, Highett VIC 3190, Australia
- Products: Vinyl record pressing
- Website: corduroy.com.au

Corduroy Records was a vinyl record pressing plant and record label that existed from 1994 to 2005 in Highett, Victoria, Australia.

The Corduroy pressing plant was established by Nick Phillips of the garage rock band The Breadmakers who saved Australia's only vinyl pressing plant from the scrap dealers in Sydney and had it relocated to Highett, Victoria.

Staff members of Corduroy included several people who were active in Australian bands and record labels, including Mikey Young and Brendan Huntley of Eddy Current Suppression Ring, Guy Blackman of Chapter Music, Richard Stanley of Aarght Records, Mark Nelson of The Stabs and Saucerlike Records, Conrad Standish of The Devastations, Shaun Gionis of Boomagates, Brendan Webb of Sandpit, Kellie Laing of Wig Wam Records, and Kim Walvisch of Humber Records.

The pressing plant had the ability to record bands straight to acetate to be pressed onto records, and in 2000 The White Stripes recorded there. These recordings were shelved and remained in Australia until 2012 when the band secured them and were released in 2020. Members of Sonic Youth also recorded at Corduroy, releasing Melbourne Direct in 2004.

In 2005 the pressing plant was bought by Zenith Records and is now located in Brunswick East, Victoria. The new owners have not continued live to acetate recording sessions.

== Discography ==
Releases recorded live to acetate at Corduroy.

- Bob Log III - Bubblestrut! (2001)
- The Dirtbombs - Pray For Pills (2002)
- Johnny Casino - Two Sides To Every Coin (2002)
- Wayne "The Train" Hancock - The Viper Smoking Across Australia Tour 2002 Souvenir Seven Incher (2002)
- Dead Moon - Sabotage / These Times With You (2003)
- Kelley Stoltz - Live To Acetate (2003)
- Mount Eerie - Mount Eerie Dances with Wolves (2004)
- Damo Suzuki Network - The Swiftsure Session (2007)
