= Casio SK-1 =

Small sampling keyboard

SK-1
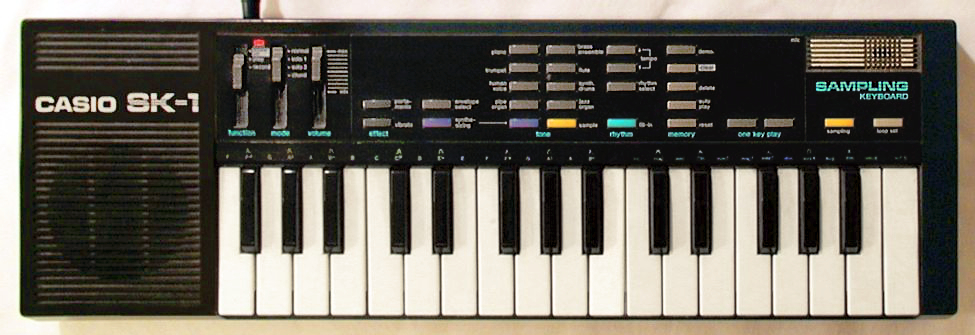
- Casio SK-1
- Manufacturer: Casio
- Dates: 1985–?

Technical specifications
- Polyphony: 4
- Timbrality: Monotimbral
- Synthesis type: Sampling, additive
- Attenuator: ADSR, 13 preset envelopes
- Storage memory: 5 preset PCM tones 3 preset additive tones 1 user additive tone 1 sample 400-step sequencer
- Effects: Portamento; Vibrato; Sample looping

Input/output
- Keyboard: 32 mini-keys
- Left-hand control: none
- External control: MIDI (starting in 1987)

The Casio SK-1 is a small sampling keyboard made by Casio in 1985. It has 32 small sized piano keys, four-note polyphony, with a sampling bit depth of 8 bit PCM and a sample rate of 9.38 kHz for 1.4 seconds, a built-in microphone and line level and microphone inputs for sampling, and an internal speaker and line out. It also features a small number of four-note polyphonic preset analog and digital instrument voices, and a simple additive voice.

All voices may be shaped by 13 preset envelopes, portamento, and vibrato. It also includes a rudimentary sequence recorder, preset rhythms and chord accompaniment. The SK-1 was thus an unusually full-featured synth in the sub-US$100 (equivalent to $300 today) home keyboard market of the time.

The SK-1 includes one pre-arranged piece of music, the Toy Symphony, which is played when the "Demo" button is pressed.

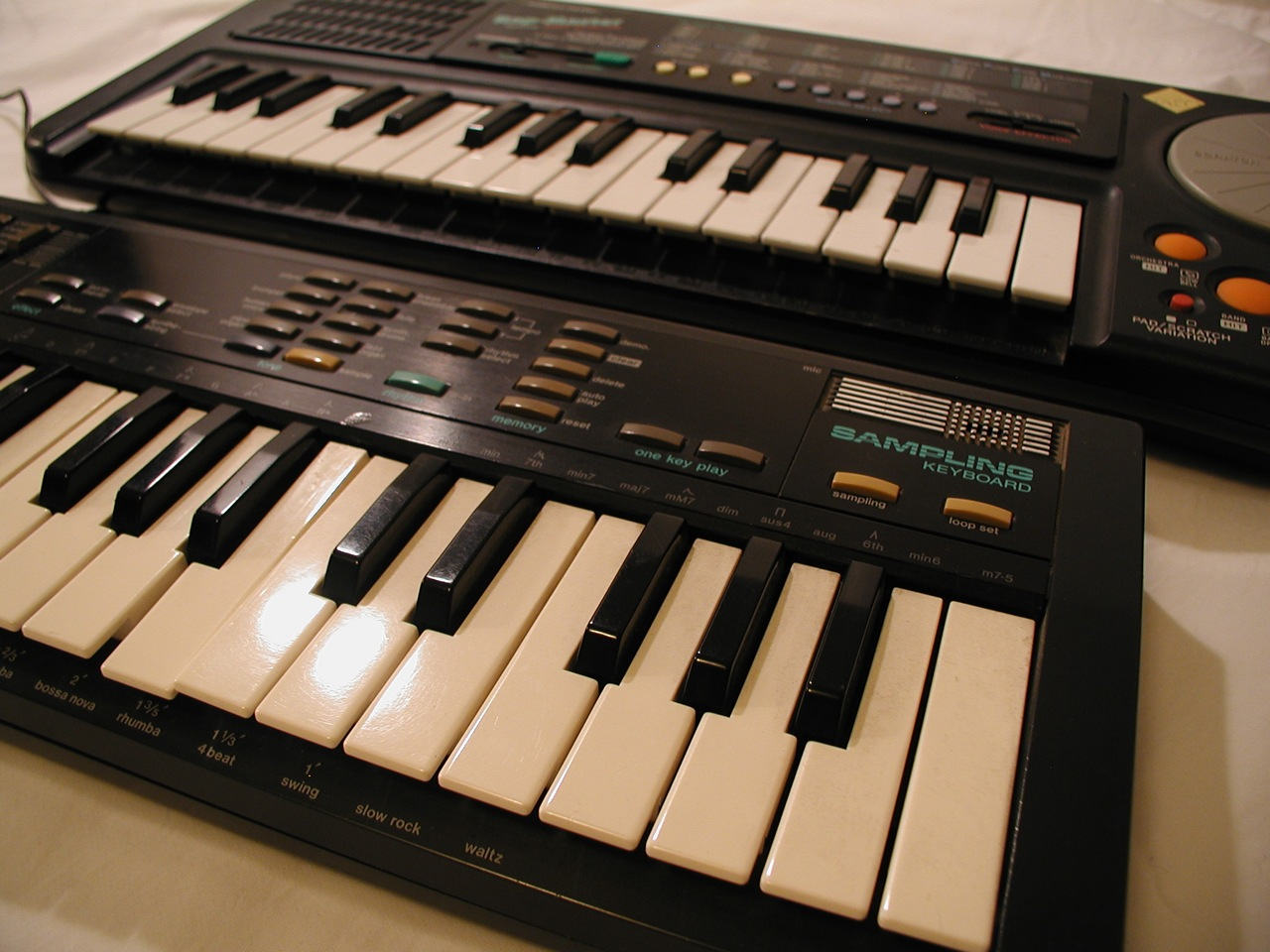
Casio SK-1 (fore) with the Realistic Rap-Master (rear).

The Radio Shack version of the Casio SK-1 is called the Realistic Concertmate 500.

The SK line continued throughout the late 1980s, including the SK-2, SK-5, SK-8 and 8A, SK-10, SK-60, SK-100, SK-200, and SK-2100.

== Use in music recordings ==
The SK-1 has been used by many recording artists for its simplicity and lo-fi sound. It became very popular in the late 1990s among the circuit bending crowd after the first guide to bending it was published by Reed Ghazala in Experimental Musical Instruments magazine, though the SK-1 was being modified as early as 1987 when Keyboard Magazine published an article on adding MIDI support.

- The synthesizer was one of the first pieces of equipment that Autechre had when they began recording music.
- Musician and score composer Michael Andrews featured a circuit bent SK-1 heavily in the Me and You and Everyone We Know musical score.
- The "Realistic Concertmate" version of the SK-1 is the primary synth used in the no wave / industrial band Special Interest.
- It was used by notable jungle artist DJ Hype for his seminal productions, and rapper and producer Large Professor used it in his early years of beat-making.
- Australian band Turnstyle used the keyboard's sample function on various songs as both repetitive motifs ("Happier Than Metallica") and melodic passages ("Sad Rambo").
- Owen Ashworth used and recorded with one for Casiotone for the Painfully Alone's second live album In Sydney.
- Graham Lewis of Wire used it frequently during their late-1980s period.
- Mount Eerie's Eleven Old Songs of Mount Eerie consisted solely of Phil Elverum's vocals and an SK-1, making use of its various effects and built-in rhythm machine.
- The SK-1 is featured on the cover of the Soccer Mommy album Collection.
- Composer Samuel Andreyev has written demanding parts for the SK-1 in several of his chamber compositions, including Vérifications, Iridescent Notation and Sextet in Two Parts.
- Damon Albarn of the British band Blur uses the SK-1 in the song "Advert", on the album Modern Life Is Rubbish.
- Fernando Ruiz of An Inferior Being uses the SK-1 for live performances as well as numerous songs in the album Please Call me Back, the live album Songs for a Rainy Day, and B-side We’re the Whiners
