= Live in Bloomington, September 30, 2011 =

Live album by Mount Eerie
- Released: July 9, 2013
- Recorded: September 30, 2011
- Venue: Russian Recording
- Genre: Indie folk
- Length: 40:24
- Label: XRA Records
- Producer: Phil Elverum

Mount Eerie chronology
Ocean Roar (2012)	Live in Bloomington, September 30, 2011 (2013)	Pre-Human Ideas (2013)

Live in Bloomington, September 30, 2011 is a live album by Mount Eerie, released in 2013. The album captures a live performance of songs from It Was Hot, We Stayed in the Water to Clear Moon.

== Recording ==
The album was recorded in Bloomington, Indiana at the Russian Recording studio while opening for the band Earth. It was recorded with a three-piece band consisting of two keyboard players and Phil Elverum.

== Reception ==
Professional ratings
Review scores
Source	Rating
Consequence of Sound	C+

Colin Joyce of Consequence of Sound wrote that "Live In Bloomington isn't just a straight-up run through Mount Eerie's greatest hits. It functions as a compelling document of what a Phil Elverum live set can be: a complete deconstruction of one of America's greatest growing songbooks".

== Tracklist ==
All tracks are written by Phil Elverum.

No.	Title	Length
1.	"introduction"	01:08
2.	"House Shape"	03:49
3.	"Between Two Mysteries"	05:36
4.	"Ancient Questions"	03:44
5.	"Karl Blau"	01:48
6.	"No Inside, No Out"	02:20
7.	"the Place I Live"	04:11
8.	"Lone Bell"	03:38
9.	"See Me"	02:44
10.	"Stone's Ode"	07:37
11.	"the Place Lives"	03:44
Total length:		40:24

== Personnel ==
- Phil Elverum – songwriting, vocals

Production

- Mike Bridavsky – recording
