= Song Islands vol. 2 =

Compilation album by Mount Eerie
- Released: October 19, 2010
- Recorded: 2002–2009, Dub Narcotic Studio
- Genre: Indie folk
- Length: 80:00
- Label: P.W. Elverum & Sun, ltd. (ELV 022)
- Producer: Phil Elverum

Mount Eerie chronology
Black Wooden (2009)	Song Islands vol. 2 (2010)	Clear Moon (2012)

Song Islands vol. 2 (Collected Rarities and Singles) is a compilation album by Mount Eerie. It was released on October 19, 2010. It is a sequel to the Microphones album Song Islands.

== Recording and release ==
The recording took place from 2002 to 2009 in the Dub Narcotic Studio in Olympia, Washington. The album consists of B-sides, rarities and never before released songs from the Microphones and Mount Eerie. Every song on the album was re-mixed and remastered. A 32-page booklet was released alongside the album.

== Music ==
The album incorporates elements of smooth jazz and punk. An official press release described the sound on the album as "Raw poems barely accompanied on acoustic guitar, expanses of wooden percussion, distorted punk instructionals, hundreds of voices singing, an attempt at smooth jazz, the lowest note on a questionable piano in a big empty".

Track 13 features a rendition of "Voice in Headphones" by Elverum's band Singers, who featured on the 2005 album Singers.

== Reception ==
Professional ratings
Review scores
Source	Rating
Consequence of Sound	C+
Pitchfork	5.6/10
Tiny Mix Tapes	3/5

The album received mixed reviews upon release. Paul Thompson of Pitchfork wrote that "Elverum's always at his best when the songs feel sewn into their surroundings; the songs from Song Islands 2 seem plucked piecemeal from the archives, divorced from the bursts of inspiration that birthed them". Alex Young of Consequence of Sound wrote that "Song Islands Vol. 2 hits incredible highs and lows even the most dedicated fan would question" but conceded that it was "on the whole, a worthy investment of time and thought". Nick Rs of Tiny Mix Tapes wrote that "The songs here, culled from eight years of output, present stylistic contrasts even starker than on any previous Microphones/Mount Eerie release". He gave particular praise to the song "Where Is My Tarp?" writing that it "overshadows practically everything around it".

== Track listing ==
All tracks are written by Phil Elverum.

No.	Title	Length
1.	"Where?"	1:12
2.	"Calf in Pasture"	1:37
3.	"the Intimacy"	4:40
4.	"I Whale"	2:48
5.	"O My Heart"	3:01
6.	"instrumental"	2:10
7.	"Where Is My Tarp?"	3:56
8.	"Don't Smoke"	2:54
9.	"Get Off the Internet"	2:11
10.	"Cooking"	1:43
11.	"Give Totally Up"	2:19
12.	"Do Not Be Afraid"	0:51
13.	"Voice in Headphones (singers)"	1:54
14.	"Cold Mountain"	3:30
15.	"Cold Mountain's Song #286"	2:22
16.	"Heart Lake at Night"	1:23
17.	"You Turn Me On"	3:33
18.	"A Sentimental Song"	2:32
19.	"Mystery Language"	1:57
20.	"Waterfalls"	2:04
21.	"This Is the Same Ocean"	0:46
22.	"In the Rain"	3:08
23.	"In Moonlight"	4:42
24.	"Thanksgiving"	2:52
25.	"instrumental"	1:30
26.	"Uncertainty"	1:33
27.	"Limp Climbing"	1:34
28.	"Grave Robbers"	1:35
29.	"Lost Wisdom"	6:44
30.	"(wind lyrics)"	5:14
31.	"Small House"	1:32
Total length:		80:00

== Personnel ==
- Phil Elverum – songwriting, vocals

Production John Golden – re-mixing and remastering
