= Sauna (disambiguation) =

Sauna may refer to:

- Sauna, a small room or house designed as a place to experience dry or wet heat sessions
  - Finnish sauna
  - Infrared sauna
  - Gay sauna
  - A term used for a type of brothel
- Sauna Open Air Metal Festival, music festival in Finland
- Sauna (1992 film), a Polish comedy-drama film directed by Filip Bajon
- Sauna (2008 film), a Finnish horror film directed by Antti-Jussi Annila
- Sauna (2025 film), a Danish drama film directed by Mathias Broe
- Sauna (album), by Mount Eerie, 2015
- "Sauna", a song by Jessie Ware on Superbloom, 2026
