= L'Oie de Cravan =

Quebec publishing house

L’Oie de Cravan or The Goose of Cravan is a Canadian publishing house based in Montreal, Quebec that specializes in poetry. It was founded in January 1992 by poet and writer Benoît Chaput. The name is seen as a tribute to the poet-boxer Arthur Cravan.

The poets published by L’Oie de Cravan are often influenced by the surrealist movement. L’Oie de Cravan also publishes the work of cartoonists and illustrators, such as Simon Bossé, Geneviève Castrée, Julie Doucet and Diane Obomsawin. It has also published the writings of people associated with the music world, such as critic Byron Coley, folk singer Michael Hurley and punk rock icon Mike Watt.
