= Mount Eerie Dances with Wolves =

EP by Mount Eerie
- Released: 2004
- Genre: Indie rock
- Length: 21:01
- Labels: P.W. Elverum & Sun, Ltd. (ELV 001)
- Producer: Phil Elverum

Mount Eerie chronology
Seven New Songs of "Mount Eerie" (2004)	Mount Eerie Dances with Wolves (2004)	"No Flashlight": Songs of the Fulfilled Night (2005)

Mount Eerie Dances with Wolves, also known as Two New Songs of Mount Eerie, is an EP by Mount Eerie. It was released in Australia as Two New Songs in 2004 and released in the United States as Dances with Wolves in 2005.

== Recording and release ==
The two songs were recorded live to acetate at Melbourne's Corduroy Records, a former pressing plant in suburban Melbourne. Elverum was joined by members of Architecture In Helsinki, Midnight Juggernauts, Ground Components and Eddy Current Suppression Ring in two largely improvised performances. 200 12" records were pressed in time for sale at the Melbourne show a week later. The record was initially released by three labels - Art School Drop Out, Bee Vamp and Elverum's own P.W Elverum & Sun album. Each of the initial records came with an individually hand-painted cover by Elverum himself.

== Reception ==
Professional ratings
Review scores
Source	Rating
Pitchfork Media	(6.9/10)

The album received a generally positive reception. Sam Ubl of Pitchfork wrote that the band were "seemingly attempting to simulate expansive Elvrum epics such as "The Glow", to somewhat inauspicious results." and that "The eleven-minute-plus "Fuck the World" shows a more brazen, even somewhat stylized Elvrum."

== Track listing ==
All songs by Phil Elverum. The same songs were released with different names.

=== Australian version ===
No.	Title	Length
1.	"Get Out of the World / In the World / Fuck the World"	11:48
2.	"Do Not Be Afraid / Get out of 'The World"	9:14
Total length:		21:04

=== North American version ===
No.	Title	Length
1.	"Mount Eerie Dances with Wolves"	11:48
2.	"Wolf Mountain Howls: 'In the World'"	9:14
Total length:		21:04
