= Geneviève Castrée =

Canadian musician and cartoonist (1981–2016)

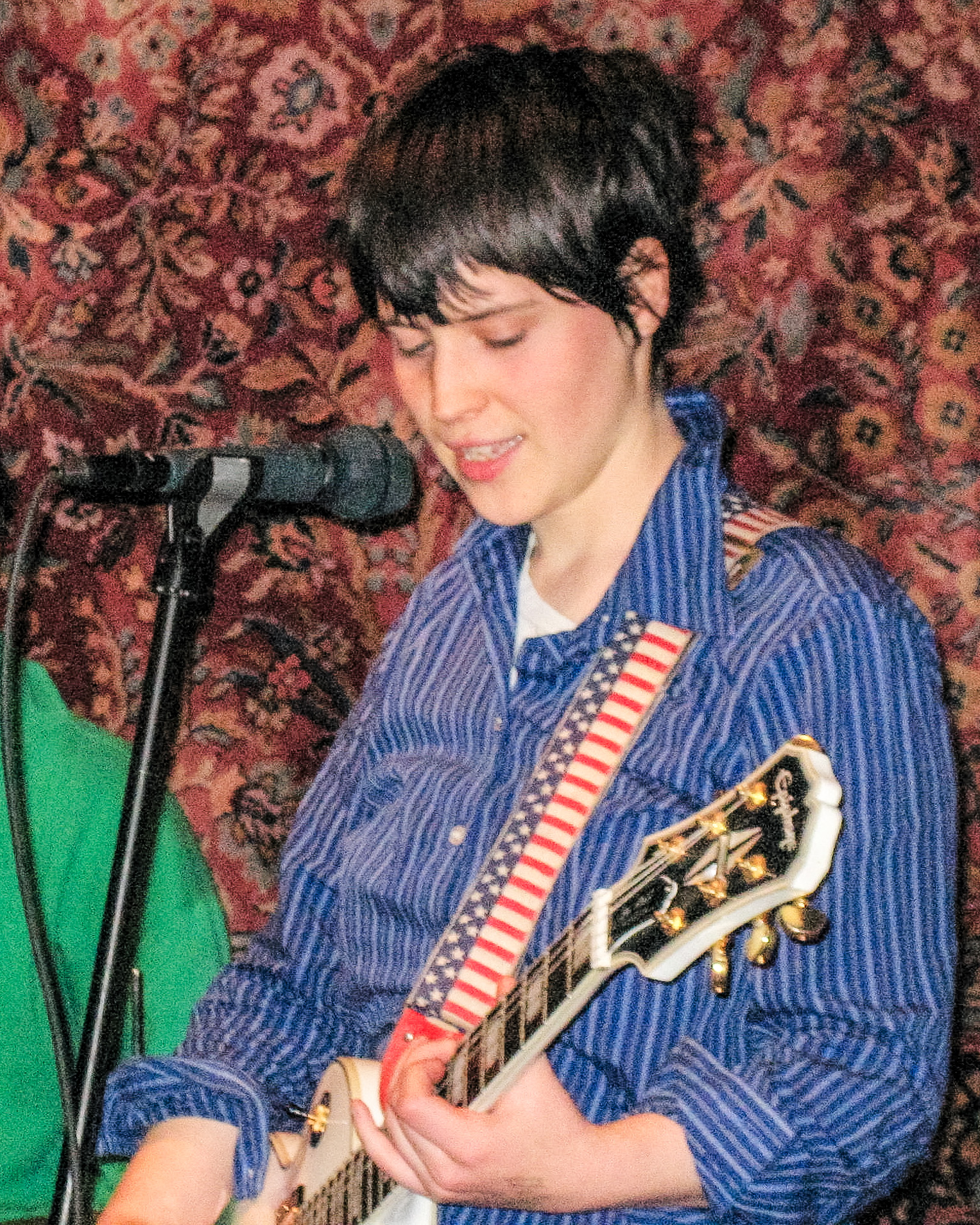
- Castrée performing in 2006
- Born: Geneviève Gosselin; April 9, 1981; Loretteville, Quebec, Canada
- Died: July 9, 2016 (aged 35); Anacortes, Washington, U.S.
- Spouse: Phil Elverum (m. 2004)
- Children: 1
- Musical career
- Genres: Indie rock; indie folk; lo-fi
- Occupations: Author; musician
- Instruments: Guitar; vocals
- Years active: 2000–2016
- Label: L'Oie de Cravan
- Website: www.opaon.ca

Geneviève Elverum (née Gosselin; April 9, 1981 – July 9, 2016), also known as Geneviève Castrée, was a Canadian cartoonist, illustrator, and musician from Quebec. An early admirer of comics, she began creating them at a young age. L'Oie de Cravan published her first book, Lait Frappé, in 2000. By 2004 she had released three more books—Die Fabrik, Roulatheque Roulatheque Nicolore and Pamplemoussi. The latter is considered her artistic breakthrough.

Her 2012 book Susceptible gave her international success and was followed by a book of poems in French titled Maman Sauvage in 2015. Her next two works A Bubble and Maman Apprivoisée were both released posthumously. She also recorded a total of eight albums under the name Woelv and Ô Paon (stylized in all caps).

In 2003, Castrée met musician Phil Elverum, and the two married the following year. In 2015, she gave birth to their only child. That same year, she was diagnosed with pancreatic cancer. She died in 2016. Elverum later recorded a series of albums centered around her life and death.

== Early life ==
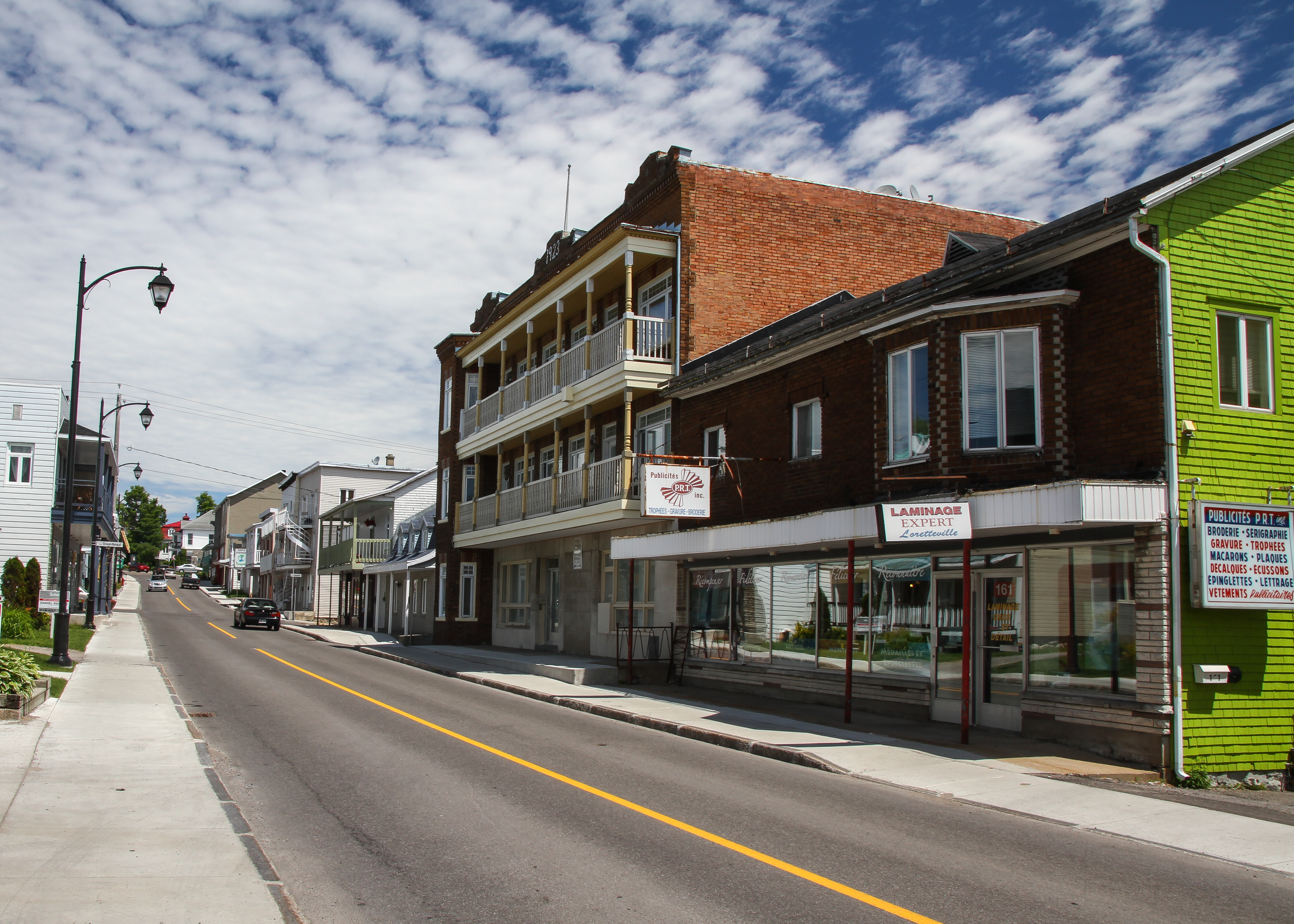
Loretteville, Quebec, where Castrée was born

Geneviève Gosselin was born in Loretteville, Quebec, in 1981. She grew up reading Tintin comics from an early age, so much so that she eventually entered, studied for, and won a Tintin competition. From an early age, she was drawing comics influenced by artists she loved, including Hergé, Renée French, Chester Brown, Julie Doucet, and Argentinian artist Quino. Doucet in particular had a significant influence on Castrée, influencing her character design and lettering style.

When Gosselin was five, her father left her and her mother. At age fifteen, Gosselin traveled around Canada and reunited with her absentee father. Although their relationship was strained, Gosselin's father did build her a log cabin to live in. In her teens, Gosselin, without formal training, began her cartooning career, publishing minicomics and adopting the name Geneviève Castrée.

Gosselin had a troubled relationship with her mother, experiencing both a deep connection and feelings of alienation and belittlement. Her relationship with her father was less contentious but also less intimate.

== Career ==
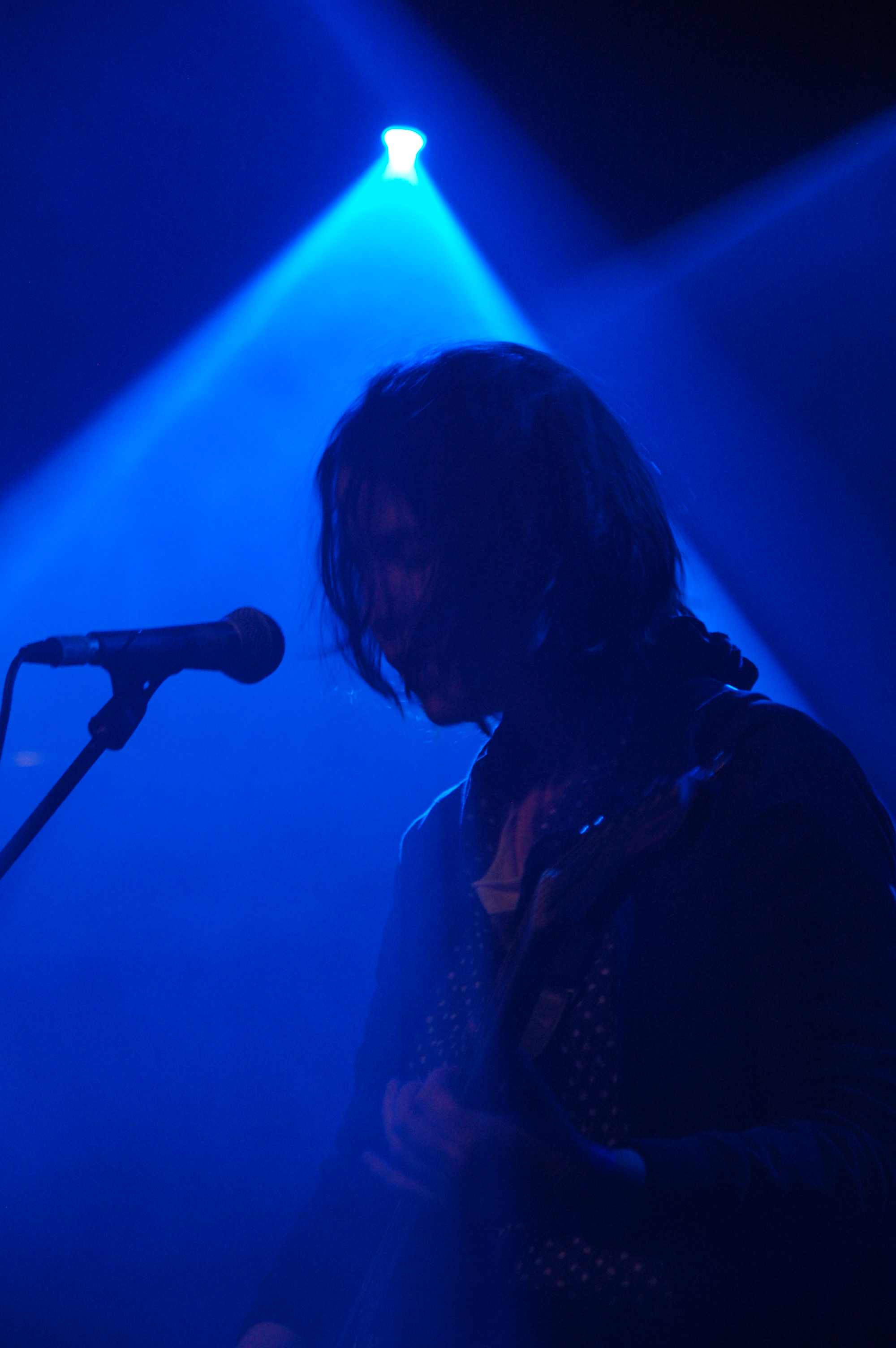
Castrée performing under the name Ô Paon in 2012

=== Artistry ===
In 2000, Montréal publisher L'Oie de Cravan published her first book, Lait Frappé, followed by Die Fabrik that same year and Roulatheque Roulatheque Nicolore in 2001, but it was Pamplemoussi in 2004 that served as her artistic breakthrough. The release marked her first major movement to integrate her music and visual art into one cohesive practice.

In 2012, Castrée released Susceptible, a graphic novel that chronicles her childhood growing up in Quebec through the character of Goglu, her childhood nickname. It was released to critical acclaim and saw her achieve international success, as well as helping her feel "unburdened" by her memories of her mother. In 2015, Maman Sauvage, a book of poems in French detailing Castrée's feelings as a mother, was published by L'Oie de Cravan under the name Geneviève Elverum. Following her death, Castrée was included in The Best American Comics 2016, edited by Roz Chast.

In 2017, her final book, A Bubble, was posthumously published by Drawn & Quarterly, having been completed by her husband, Phil Elverum, and Portland artist Anders Nilsen. They were initially wary about finishing it but concluded that it would be better for the book to be in a state of "easy readability rather than burden it with the awkward unfinished look, too cloaked in its context to be functional as a standalone thing." Castrée left instructions for its creation after her death. According to Elverum, she worked on it until her "literal final days". The book was created for her daughter as a gift, although she did intend for it to be published. It centers around their relationship and Castrée's struggle with cancer, which she compares to living in a bubble. It features sparse text and is instead primarily told via an image per page. It concludes with an afterword by Elverum. Elverum noted that its creation was Castrée's way of coping.

A book of poems titled Maman Apprivoisée was released in 2018. It consists of 44 poems written in French and English. It deals with her feelings surrounding her giving birth in 2015, and being diagnosed with pancreatic cancer the same year. Elverum has said that he is putting together a book of poems by her as well as a monograph of her illustrations.

=== Musical career ===
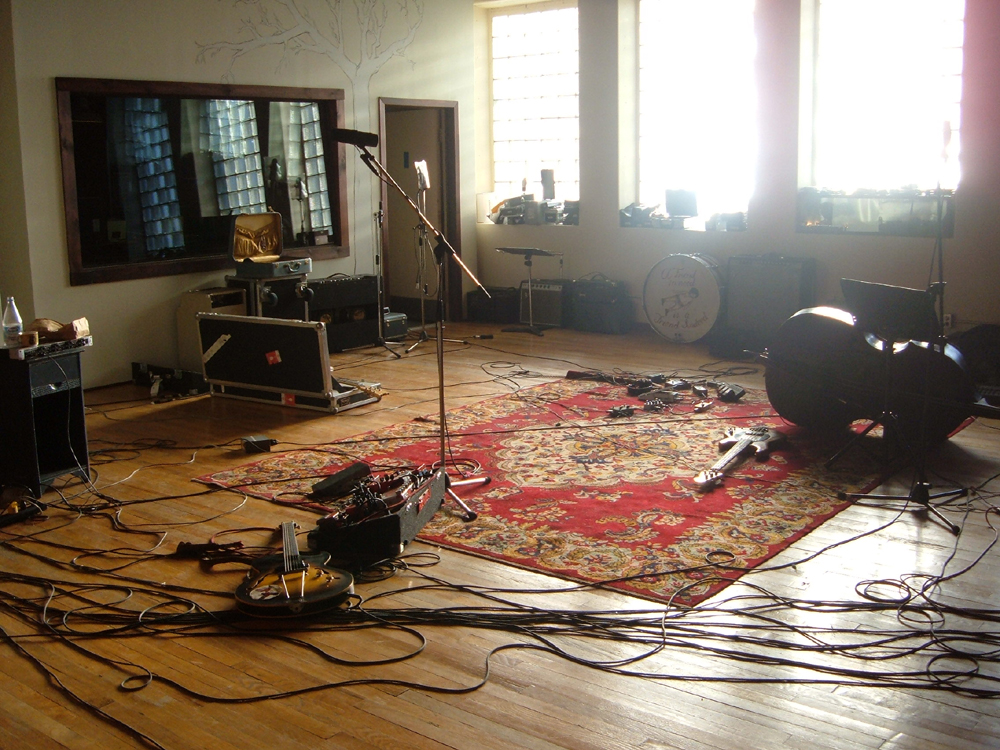
Hotel2Tango, the Montreal studio where Castrée recorded the Ô Paon album Courses

A self-taught musician, Castrée's first release was an accompanying LP to her 2004 book Pamplemoussi, recorded and mixed by Thomas Shields and Matt Skillings of the band Run Chico Run. The two artists provided many of the instruments and backing tracks to the album, as well as musical training and financing for the recording. The album was recorded and mixed in Victoria, British Columbia. It is lo-fi in nature, with Castrée singing in French over "childlike" instruments, such as a keyboard and recorder.

Under the name Woelv, Castrée released the 2006 EP Gris via Elverum's label P.W. Elverum & Sun, Ltd. Gris saw her expand on her already-established lo-fi sound. Her final release under the Woelv name came in 2007 as Tout seul dans la forêt en plein jour, avez-vous peur? (English: Alone in the Forest in the Middle of the Day, Are You Scared?). The album was recorded in Olympia, Washington, via K Records, with Elverum once again involved.

In 2009, Castrée established her own label and began releasing music under the name Ô Paon. In 2010, she released an LP, Courses, recorded at Hotel2Tango, Montreal, with Thierry Amar, and in 2015 released Fleuve, recorded with Elverum and featuring Nicholas Krgovich and Lori Goldston.

Castrée also made appearances on recordings by Mount Eerie, Thanksgiving, Karl Blau, D+ and Aidan Baker. She and Elverum helped create the What The Heck Fest. She released a total of eight albums under both names.

=== Themes and style ===
Castrée's literary work often dealt with topics such as loyalty, her relationship with her parents and childhood abuse. They were typically of a discreet nature, and often eschewed typical comics paneling, alongside using negative space and open page layouts, among other techniques. Her work featured a meticulous folk art style that made heavy use of vibrant color. Her characters were often expressive, being described as "fragile" and "broken", and were drawn with "wiggly" arms and "bending" legs. Themes such as sorrow and elation were present throughout her work in a symbiotic manner.

== Personal life and death ==
Castrée was married to musician Phil Elverum, who has released music as the Microphones and Mount Eerie. They met in 2003 and wed in 2004. They originally intended to move to Canada but after searching for residency decided to remain in the United States, in the town of Anacortes, Washington, where Elverum grew up. Castrée was also close friends with musician Lori Goldston and poet Joanne Kyger. French was Castrée's primary language.

Castrée was diagnosed with pancreatic cancer in 2015, shortly after the birth of her and Elverum's only child. In June 2016, a GoFundMe account was set up by Elverum to assist with their finances. She died on July 9, 2016, at the age of 35. Her husband soon posted an update: "She died at home with me and her parents holding her, hopefully having reached some last minute peace".

== Legacy ==
Her widower, Phil Elverum, released three albums under his Mount Eerie project – A Crow Looked at Me, Now Only and Lost Wisdom pt. 2 – which chronicle Castrée's life and mourn her early death. Katherine Paul's debut album Mother of My Children was inspired by Castrée's death, whom Paul described as her "mentor". Clyde Petersen was inspired by Castrée's death to release an album he had recorded while briefly house-sitting for Castrée and Elverum. Many other artists paid tribute to her. Anders Nilsen called her "one of my favorite people in the world and one of my favorite artists". Former publisher Chris Oliveros expressed gratitude and pride for having worked with her and publishing her works.

== Bibliography ==
=== Books ===
All titles published as Geneviève Castrée except where indicated:

- Lait Frappé, L'Oie de Cravan, 2000.
- Die Fabrik, Reprodukt, 2000.
- Roulathèque Roulathèque Nicolore, L'Oie de Cravan, 2001.
- Pamplemoussi, LP and book, L'Oie de Cravan, 2004.
- Masques, Sweet Dream Press, 2007.
- Tout Seul Dans La Forêt En Plein Jour, Avez-Vous Peur? (as Woelv), CD/LP and book, K Records, 2007.
- Enfance, self-published anonymously, 2010
- Susceptible, Drawn & Quarterly/L’Apocalypse, 2013.
- Maman Sauvage (poetry, as Geneviève Elverum), L'Oie de Cravan, 2015.
- A Bubble, Drawn & Quarterly, 2017.
- Maman Apprivoisée (poetry, as Geneviève Elverum), L'Oie de Cravan, 2018.
- Geneviève Castrée: Complete Works 1981-2016, Drawn & Quarterly, 2022.

==== Featured in ====
- Kramers Ergot Four, Ginkgo Press, 2003.
- Drawn & Quarterly Showcase #3, Drawn & Quarterly, 2005.
- Drawn & Quarterly: Twenty-Five Years of Contemporary Cartooning, Comics, and Graphic Novels, Drawn & Quarterly, 2012.
- The Best American Comics 2016, Houghton Mifflin Harcourt, 2016.

== Exhibitions ==
- Orange Sanguine (drawings and dolls), The Crying Room, Vancouver, BC, 2002.
- Deviate (with Allison Cole), Junc Gallery, Los Angeles, CA, 2006.
- Masques, Book Gallery Popotame, Tokyo, 2007.
- Geneviève Castrée : Drawings, Adam Baumgold Gallery, New York, NY, 2008.
- Pia-Anna Borneo Gallery, Lucerne, Switzerland, March 28 - April 5, 2009.
- Some Shit, THANKY, Richmond, VA, April 3–27, 2009.
- Débarrassée/Décomplexée, Presspop Gallery/Book Gallery Popotame, Tokyo, 2010.
- Hivers, Book Gallery Popotame, Tokyo, 2013.
- Susceptible , Fantagraphics Bookstore & Gallery, Seattle, WA, 2013.
- Forest of Suicides (group show), Galeria de Muerte, Tokyo, 2013.
- Drawn & Quarterly 25th (group show), Galerie Martel, Paris, 2016.
- A Bubble, Editions de la Pasteque, Montreal, QC, 2018.
- This is Serious (group show), Art Gallery of Hamilton, Hamilton, ON, 2019.

== Discography ==
=== Woelv releases ===
- Pamplemoussi (as Geneviève Castrée), LP and book, L'Oie de Cravan, 2004.
- Gris, CD-EP/10" record, P.W. Elverum & Sun, 2006.
- Le niveau de la mer/Bête à Cheval, 7" record, K Records, 2007.
- Tout Seul Dans La Forêt En Plein Jour, Avez-vous Peur?, CD/LP and book, K Records, 2007

=== Woelv compilation appearances ===
- Le Béluga on Trust In Sirens: What The Heck Fest 2004, CD, Kelp Monthly, 2004.
- Réconciliation on Flotsam and Jetsam: What The Heck Fest 2005, CD, Kelp Monthly, 2005.
- Le Déserteur (Boris Vian) on Free The Bird: What The Heck Fest 2006, CD, Kelp Monthly, 2006.

=== Ô Paon releases ===
- a)b)c)d)e), 7" record, TAUS 001 Disques Ô Paon, 2009.
- Courses, CD/LP, TAUS 003 Disques Ô Paon, 2010.
- Quatorze/Quinze Ans, 10" record, TAUS 004 Disques Ô Paon, 2013.
- Fleuve, LP, TAUS 005 Disques Ô Paon, 2015.

=== Ô Paon compilation appearances ===
- Raffinerie on What The Heck Fest 2007, CD, Charming Tedious, 2007
- Les Cerfs-Volants on The Second Marriage Compilation, CD, Marriage Records, 2007.
- Le Retour on No Band Is An Island, CD, Knw-Yr-Own, 2008.
- Nunavik on Songs For The Arctic Ocean, digital, Beat is Murder Records, 2009.
- Certitude (D+) on What The Heck?, CD, Knw-Yr-Own, 2009.
- Films Americains on Yeti Ten, CD and magazine, Yeti, 2010.
- Evolution (alternative version) on Resume vol. 2, digital, 7 e.p., 2011.

=== Collaborations and appearances ===
- Welcome Nowhere by Thanksgiving, LP, P.W. Elverum & Sun, 2004.
- No Flashlight by Mount Eerie, CD/LP, P.W. Elverum & Sun, 2005.
- The Watery Graves of Portland and/et Geneviève with The Watery Graves of Portland, CD/LP, Marriage Records, 2007.
- Mount Eerie Pts. 6 & 7 by Mount Eerie, 10" record and book, P.W. Elverum & Sun, 2007.
- Karl & Geneviève, with Karl Blau, 7" record, TAUS 002, Disques Ô Paon, 2011.
- Clear Moon by Mount Eerie, LP, P.W. Elverum & Sun, 2012.
- Already Drowning by Aidan Baker, CD/LP, Gizeh Records, 2013.
- Sauna by Mount Eerie, LP, P.W. Elverum & Sun, 2015.
