= Black Wooden Ceiling Opening =

EP by Mount Eerie
- Released: March 4, 2008
- Recorded: Department of Safety; Anacortes, Washington; October 30, 2006
- Genres: Indie rock, black metal
- Length: 21:39
- Labels: Southern Distribution; P.W. Elverum & Sun, Ltd. (ELV 016)
- Producer: Phil Elverum

Mount Eerie chronology
Mount Eerie pts. 6 & 7 (2007)	Black Wooden Ceiling Opening (2008)	Lost Wisdom (2008)

Black Wooden Ceiling Opening is an EP released by Mount Eerie. It was released on March 4, 2008. The EP was described by singer Phil Elverum as "black metal using natural materials".

== Recording and release ==
The album was recorded by Phil Elverum, Jason Anderson and Kjetil Jenssen on October 30, 2006 in Anacortes, Washington. It was released alongside an 11-song bootleg recording of the same group of musicians featured on the album live in concert at the Department of Safety in Anacortes, WA.

Elverum found the inspiration for the song "Domesticated Dog" from his time spent riding in a minivan across Montana with Calvin Johnson and his mother in September 2006. He speculated that the “sleeping giant” in the last verse "came from those reclining-human-like Montana hills." "Don't Smoke" came from Elverum's desire to "be more confrontational and pragmatic" with his songs hoping to get his audience who were "vegan and radical and eat healthy food" yet smoked cigarettes to stop.

3 of the 6 tracks have been released prior to the EP's release, albeit in different versions: "Blue Light on the Floor" was released on Mount Eerie pts. 6 & 7, "Don't Smoke" was released on Don't Smoke/Get Off the Internet under The Microphones name and "Stop Singing" was released on No Flashlight.

== Music ==
Expanding on the sound of heavier songs on previous albums like The Glow Pt. 2. Black Wooden Ceiling Opening sees Elverum go for a dark and raw aesthetic, incorporating elements of black metal and hardcore. Eric Hill of Exclaim! described it as a "quick distillation of everything that Mount Eerie was in the mid-2000s," and the closest to metal Elverum has produced.

== Reception ==
Professional ratings
Review scores
Source	Rating
Tiny Mix Tapes	4/5 stars
Pitchfork Media	(7.6/10)

Upon release, the EP received a generally positive reception. Brock Thiessen of Exclaim! wrote that "The record shows him having a bit of fun with his work and to the listener's benefit, including three superb reinterpretations of older, more reserved Mount Eerie tracks" and that "Factor in some added live tracks and there's no denying Black Wooden is an important and enjoyable part of the Elverum catalogue". Jessica Suarez of Pitchfork wrote that "Like a smoker, Elverum's compulsion to keep going trumps his own best interests-- when he recognizes that compulsion is when he's at his best".

"JSPICER" of Tinymixtapes wrote that "Black Wooden Ceiling Opening isn’t so much about reinvention as it is about reinterpretation." and that "With this EP, Phil isn’t cashing in on fan loyalty, nor is he trying any fancy parlor tricks. Black Wooden Ceiling Opening is simply another side of Phil’s Mount Eerie persona. And, for me, discovering Phil’s playful side through this EP has been a pleasure akin to sex"

== Track listing ==
All tracks are written by Phil Elverum.

No.	Title	Length
1.	"Appetite"	4:13
2.	"Domesticated Dog"	2:09
3.	"In Moonlight"	4:25
4.	"Blue Light on the Floor"	2:24
5.	"Don't Smoke"	2:52
6.	"Stop Singing"	2:52
Total length:		21:39

Live At The Dept. Of Safety, Oct. 30th 2006
No.	Title	Length
7.	"Intro"	1:12
8.	"Appetite"	4:38
9.	"Domesticated Dog"	2:22
10.	"Don't Smoke"	3:35
11.	"Stop Singing"	5:29
12.	"In Moonlight"	4:51
13.	"The Universe Is Shown"	2:58
14.	"No Inside, No Out"	2:20
15.	"Uncertainty"	2:15
16.	"The Moan"	2:26
17.	"Blue Light On The Floor"	4:55
Total length:		56:00

== Personnel ==
- Phil Elverum – lead vocals, songwriting, recording, and production
- Jason Anderson – recording
- Kjetil Jenssen – recording
