= White Stag (album) =

Live album by Mount Eerie
- Released: May 2, 2009
- Recorded: White Stag Building, Portland, Oregon
- Genre: Indie folk
- Length: 19:18
- Label: P.W. Elverum & Sun. (ELV 021)
- Producer: Phil Elverum

Mount Eerie chronology
Dawn (2008)	White Stag (2009)	Wind's Poem (2009)

Alternative album cover
- Zoomed in version of the poster that came with the album

White Stag is an album released by Phil Elverum under the name Mount Eerie, on May 2, 2009. The album centers around the building of the same name where Eleverum recorded the album and briefly lived.

== Recording and release ==
Writer Matthew Stadler, who led public programming and the Publication Studio at White Stag was the one who conceived of the project and subsequently contacted Elverum. Stadler's only stipulation was that the project be directly related to building. Elverum recorded the album during a week long residency at the White Stag building from March 30, 2009, to April 6, 2009. Elverum used a Marshall amp and a 4 track analogue tape to record the album.

Elverum performed the album in its entirety on May 2, 2009, in the White Stag building. He then collaborated with a group of graduate students to package and release the album. The album was released in a limited CD-R which included a poster with the lyrics printed onto it. Only a couple hundred copies were made.

== Music ==
The album is a mix of traditional songs and field recordings. Elverum chose to create a "fake history", focusing on the mythology of the building rather than presenting an accurate representation. In an interview with Portland Mercury he stated that "The songs are about how hard it is to maintain a relationship with memory when something bad has happened" noting the building's history with the oppression of Native Americans and the divide between the rich and poor.

== Track listing ==
All tracks are written by Phil Elverum.

No.	Title	Length
1.	"(calling)"	0:31
2.	"Origin"	2:08
3.	"(basement instrumental)"	2:49
4.	"Mud Grave"	1:49
5.	"Sighing"	1:53
6.	"(summoning)"	2:17
7.	"Quiet Echoes"	2:19
8.	"Hunting"	1:40
9.	"(3rd floor instrumental)"	1:45
10.	"Wasted Wealth"	2:01
Total length:		19:18

== Personnel ==
- Phil Elverum – songwriting, vocals
