= Zenith Records =

Australian record pressing plant

- Founded: 2005; 21 years ago
- Headquarters: Brunswick East 3057, Victoria, Australia
- Products: Vinyl record mastering, vinyl record pressing
- Services: Small and large production of vinyl records
- Owner: Paul Rigby (co-owner)
- Website: zenithrecords.org

Zenith Records is a vinyl record pressing plant based in Melbourne, Australia, established in 2005.

== History ==
Zenith Records was founded by Australian hip-hop artist Pegz, owner of Obese Records, who purchased and fixed the pressing machinery so that it was on par with international pressing plants.

The early machinery at Zenith had originated at Nick Phillips' Corduroy Records pressing plant which was sold to Zenith Records in 2005. Their record presses and infrastructure had all been operative in Australia in various independent record pressing plants like Modern and Sundown, the cutting lathe having run at EMI in Sydney. These presses have been progressively upgraded and refurbished. Originally located in Richmond, the plant relocated to Brunswick East in 2013.

In 2018, working with outside CNC machining / engineering firms, Zenith Records began development of its own in-house engineered products. A prototype mould or die (for record pressing) was developed in 2019, with ongoing modification and improvement. This eventually led to acquisition of CNC machining equipment. With a lease on the factory next door, they now had a modern CNC machine shop, with two engineering machinists. As a result, Zenith's engineering department produces and exports engineered solutions, moulds, and other spare parts and consumables to the vinyl record pressing industry.

In 2020, Zenith added two dedicated gluing lines for inner paper sleeve making and jacket gluing. With print finishing in-house, this eliminated supply chain delays, and improved the quality control of their finished sleeves, pockets, and gatefold jackets.

In 2025, Zenith had four Pheenix Alpha AD12 automatic record presses installed, which, according to Zenith, "tripled production capacity to approximately 6,000 records per week."

== See also ==
- List of independent record labels
