= SK =

SK may refer to:

== People ==
- SK (actor) or Sivakarthikeyan, Indian actor
- Salman Khan or SK, Indian actor
- Shahram Kashani (SK), an Iranian-American singer
- Shakib Khan, Bangladeshi film actor, known by the initialism SK
- Søren Kierkegaard, Danish philosopher and theologian

== Businesses and organizations ==
- SK Foods, an American agribusiness company
- SK Hand Tools, an American tool manufacturer
- Sangguniang Kabataan, Philippines youth councils
- SK Group, South Korean conglomerate
- Scandinavian Airlines (IATA code SK)
- Silicon Knights, a Canadian video game developer

== Places ==
=== Slovakia ===
- Slovakia (ISO country code)
  - ISO 3166-2:SK, codes for the regions of Slovakia
  - .sk, the internet country code top-level domain for Slovakia
  - Slovak koruna, a former currency of Slovakia
  - Slovak language (ISO 639-1 language code "sk")

=== Other ===
- sk. sokak, Turkish postal abbreviation
- South Korea, an Asian country
- Saskatchewan, a Canadian province by postal abbreviation
- Sengkang, a Singapore town
- Sikkim, a state in northeastern India (ISO 3166-2 code)
  - Kingdom of Sikkim, a former monarchy in South Asia (ISO 3166-1 alpha-2 code: SK, now deprecated), an Indian protectorate merged with it as a state in 1975
- Svidník, Slovakia, vehicle plates
- Sisak, vehicle plate for city in Croatia
- South Kingstown, Rhode Island, a United States town
- Sultan Kudarat, province in Soccsksargen, the Philippines

== Science and technology ==
- sk (unit) (Skot), an old and deprecated unit of measurement for dark luminance
- SK (people mover), a vehicle
- SK calculus, an alternate form of SKI combinator calculus
- SK radar, an American air-search radar used during World War II
- Silent key, an amateur radio operator who has died
- "Stop keying", a prosign used in Morse code
- Super-Kamiokande, a Japanese neutrino detector

=== Biology ===
- SK channel, small conductance calcium-activated potassium channels, a family of ion channels

=== Medicine ===
- Solar keratosis or senile keratosis
- Streptokinase, a bacterial enzyme used in the treatment of blood clots

== Sport ==
- SK Gaming, an electronic sports team

== Other uses ==
- Regulation S-K, regarding financial statements in the United States
- Sekolah Kebangsaan, a type of school in Malaysia
- Storekeeper, a naval rating in the United States Navy
- Senran Kagura (SK), video game series
- Satakunnan Kansa, a Finnish newspaper
