= Black Wooden =

EP by Mount Eerie
- Released: December 14, 2009
- Recorded: 2007
- Genre: Indie folk
- Length: 21:46
- Label: Southern Records
- Producer: Phil Elverum

Mount Eerie chronology
| Wind's Poem (2009) | Black Wooden (2009) | Song Islands vol. 2 (2010) |

Black Wooden is a compilation EP by Mount Eerie, the musical project of musician Phil Elverum. It was released on December 14, 2009. It is the first and only record by Elverum to be released under the Latitudes Series by Southern Records.

== Recording ==
The EP was recorded at Southern Studios in London, England while Elverum was touring the UK in the summer of 2007, using a borrowed guitar alongside Southern Records engineer Harvey Birrell.

== Reception ==
Professional ratings
Review scores
| Source | Rating |
|---|---|
| Pitchfork | 7.0/10 |
| Spectrum Culture | 3.5/5.0 |
| Beats Per Minute | 72% |

Upon release, the EP received a generally positive reception. Matthew Solarski of Pitchfork wrote that "if you're but an aspiring convert who's reluctant to make a huge commitment, as a welcome mat to the realm of Mount Eerie, you could do much worse".

Luke Winkle of Spectrum Culture while enjoying the EP found it at times frustrating or "astoundingly boring" but ultimately said that "He’s at his best when keeping it simple, and when the songs do drift into hollow wankery ("Marriage"), he's quick to refocus on the coniferous textures that make the music worth listening to in the first place".

Chase McMullen of Beats Per Minute said that the EP was a "pretty simplistic listen. While strong, the EP doesn't really boast one of those epiphanous Elverum moments. It's fine, but easily lost amongst the vast catalog the man already offers".

== Track listing ==
All tracks are written by Phil Elverum.

| No. | Title | Length |
|---|---|---|
| 1. | "Black Wooden" | 6:02 |
| 2. | "The Bottomless Pit" | 2:13 |
| 3. | "If We Knew" | 2:01 |
| 4. | "Appetite" | 3:21 |
| 5. | "Marriage" | 5:46 |
| 6. | "Mount Eerie Revealed" | 2:22 |
| Total length: | | 21:46 |
