= Eleven Old Songs of Mount Eerie =

Compilation album by Mount Eerie
- Released: December 6, 2005
- Label: P. W. Elverum & Sun, Ltd. (ELV 003)
- Producer: Phil Elverum

Mount Eerie chronology
Singers (2005)	Eleven Old Songs of Mount Eerie (2005)	Mount Eerie pts. 6 & 7 (2007)

Eleven Old Songs of Mount Eerie is an album by Mount Eerie written during Elverum's stay in Finnkonevika hyette, Norway in the winter of 2002/2003 and recorded in Anacortes in the winter of 2004. The only instrument present on the album is a Casiotone keyboard.

All songs from the album with the exception of "The Boom" were later re-recorded for the 2008 album Dawn with "I Love (It) So Much" being renamed as "A Show of Hands". Another version of "Wooly Mammoth's Mighty Absence" was also released on the Seven New Songs EP.

== Track listing ==
All songs written by Phil Elverum.

1. "Cold Mountain"
2. "I Say 'No'"
3. "The Boom"
4. "The Dead of Night"
5. "Wooly Mammoth's Mighty Absence"
6. "Great Ghosts"
7. "Log in the Waves"
8. "I Love (It) So Much!"
9. "Goodbye Hope"
10. "Who?"
11. "See Me"

== Critical reception ==
In a negative review for Cokemachineglow, Dom Sinacola wrote that "11 Old Songs is not very good. Seriously. It’s aimless and boring while still enamored with itself".
