= SK Foods =

California-based agribusiness company

- Industry: Agriculture
- Defunct: June 2009
- Fate: Acquired by Olam International
- Headquarters: Monterey, California, United States
- Key people: Scott Salyer
- Products: Tomatoes

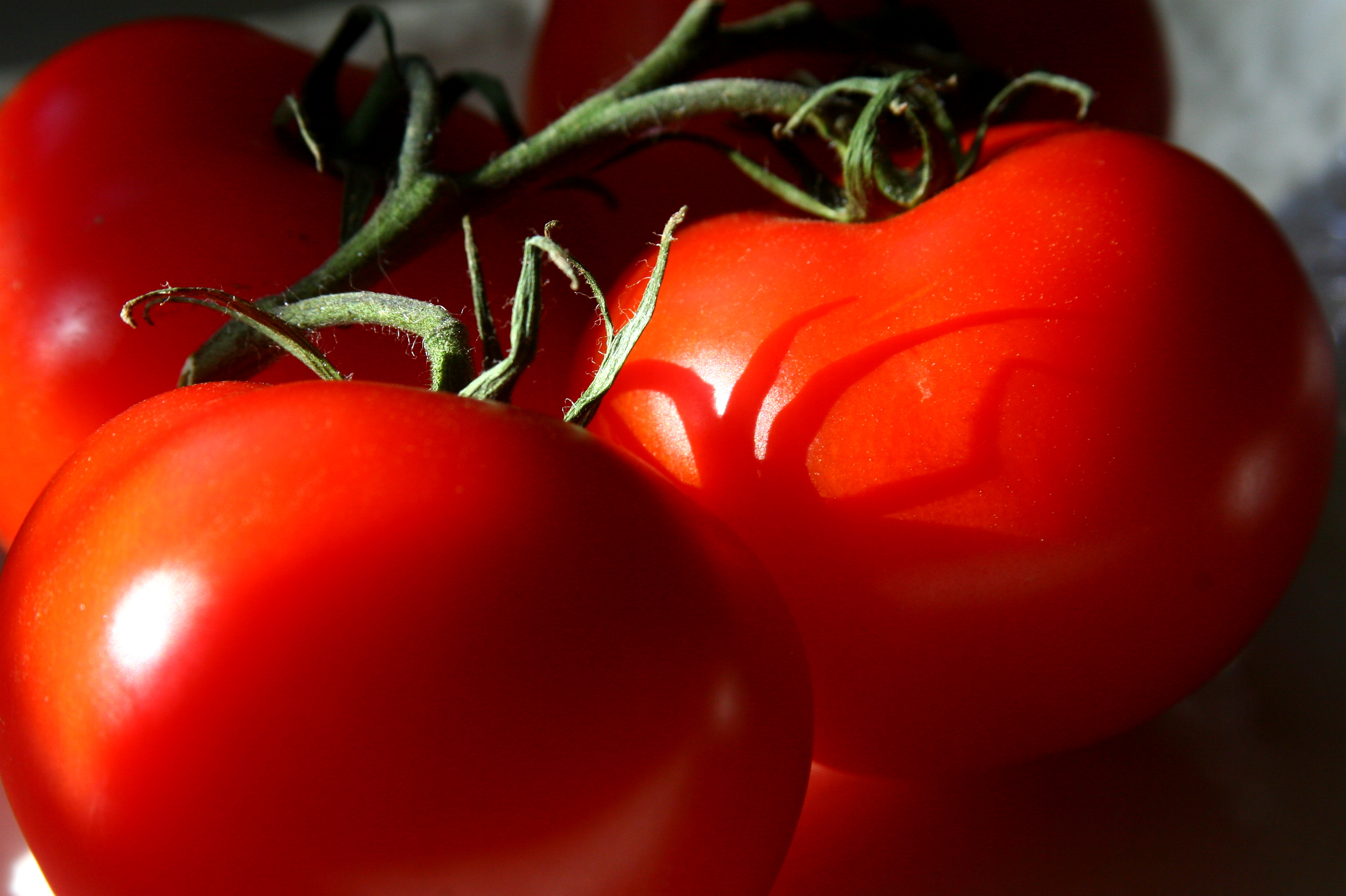
SK Foods was a major tomato processor

SK Foods L.P. was a California-based agribusiness company, with two packing and processing plants in Williams, California, and Lemoore, California, respectively. It was a major tomato processor. SK Foods, Ingomar Packing Co. and Los Gatos Tomato products formed the California Tomato Export Group, (CTEG), which collectively produced over half of the U.S. supply of tomato products at the time of the group's formation in 2005. The company's Williams plant has employed hundreds of people each summer to can and process tomatoes during harvest season.

== Controversy ==
Former owner Scott Salyer was accused of racketeering and corruption in early 2010 stemming from what was purported to be a five-year investigation targeting the processed-tomato division of his company SK Foods by the United States Department of Justice. Salyer's petition seeking a presidential pardon was denied in 2025.

The investigation, named "Operation Rotten Tomato" by Federal investigators, was prompted when Dale Campbell of Weintraub Tobin, representing The Morning Star Packing Company, paid for an internal investigation, the Vilfer Report. This investigation concerned an embezzlement by a former sales executive who had subsequently gone to work at SK Foods. The executive was turned into a key informant for the FBI and an operative working with the FBI against Salyer. Investigators alleged that the company bribed buyers such as Frito-Lay, Kraft Foods and Safeway to accept tomato paste with higher mold counts than listed, to pay above-market prices, and to provide SK with information on competitors' activities. Court documents filed by the law firm of Keker and Vannest demonstrate Salyer and SK Foods never paid any bribes, while senior district Judge Lawrence K. Karlton found no calculable victimization recommending parties should seek civil remedies, in United States Eastern District of California, Sacramento, case number 2:10-cr-00061 LKK. In the case 2:2009-cv-00208 Morning Star Packing Company, et al. v. SK Foods, et al. chief District Judge Kimberly J. Mueller found against the Plaintiff, The Morning Star Packing Company, and Ruled the Morning Star failed to prove its allegation of crime of conspiracy and bribery scheme. This Ruling was upheld in No. 19-16649 D.C. No. 2:09-cv-00208-KJM-EFB by the 9th Circuit Court of Appeals in San Francisco on December 21, 2020 validating the original finding made by Judge Karlton in 2013. SK Foods lenders forced an involuntary Chapter 11 bankruptcy instant action in May 2009, in United States Eastern District of California, Sacramento, case number Case 09-28956 referencing news articles that reported the FBI investigation as justification for withholding financing. SK Foods L.P. was transferred in an 11 U.S. Code § 363 transaction, initiated by the Duly Appointed and Acting Chapter 11 Bankruptcy Trustee Bradley D. Sharp, a member of the Board of Directors of the American Bankruptcy Institute and the President & CEO of Development Specialists, Inc. Los Angeles office, in United States Eastern District of California, Sacramento, case number 09-29160, in June 2009 to Olam International, based in Singapore. It is now known as Olam Tomato Processors. An associated produce company, Salyer American Fresh Foods, was forced to close after its lender referenced a news article as justification to stop providing the company with money.

On March 23, 2012, Salyer entered into a Plea Agreement supplied by the United States Department of Justice which identified one count price-fixing in the antitrust case and one count racketeering in the RICO 1964 case, counts 1 and 8. One RICO count alone risks a 30 year mandatory minimum sentence according to the United States Federal Sentencing Guidelines. A federal judge on Tuesday appeared perplexed how the former millionaire agribusiness owner ended up in the jam he confronted in a 15th-floor courtroom. U.S. District Court Judge Lawrence K. Karlton questioned why the 57-year-old threw away a Monterey-based farming empire that stretched from the San Joaquin Valley to New Zealand. "Here's a millionaire who risked everything for nothing," the judge said. "I don't understand it."

The controversy involving SK Foods L.P. has since become a case study underpinning academic research published in scholarly journals looking into issues in the financial industry, political economy, International affairs and International and other extra-territorial public administration.
