= "No Flashlight": Songs of the Fulfilled Night =

Studio album by Mount Eerie
- Released: May 9, 2005
- Recorded: Nowhere, Anacortes, Washington; Dub Narcotic, Olympia, Washington; October 19, 2004 – January 30, 2005
- Genres: Indie rock, lo-fi
- Length: 37:51
- Labels: P.W. Elverum & Sun, Ltd. (US), Play/Rec (EU)
- Producer: Phil Elverum

Mount Eerie chronology
Mount Eerie Dances with Wolves (2004)	"No Flashlight": Songs of the Fulfilled Night (2005)	Singers (2005)

Mount Eerie studio album chronology
"No Flashlight": Songs of the Fulfilled Night (2005)	Lost Wisdom (2008)

"No Flashlight": Songs of the Fulfilled Night is the debut studio album released by the band Mount Eerie. It was released on May 9, 2005, and features appearances by Geneviève Castrée and Jason Wall.

== Recording and release ==
The album was recorded in Nowhere, Anacortes, from October 19, 2004, to January 30, 2005, the mixing was done at The Unknown studio in Anacortes, it was mastered by T. Stollenwerk.

The album was initially released in 2005 under the name "ELV005". The album was re-released in 2015 under the name "ELV037". The re-release was re-mixed, re-mastered, and re-pressed with redesigned jackets.

Physical versions of the album come with a very large album fold-out with one side showing a large illustration, and the other filled with extensive footnotes and explanations of the songs, with references, clippings, and photos.

== The Drums from "No Flashlight" by Mt. Eerie ==
The drum tracks from this album were later released separately as The Drums from "No Flashlight" by Mt. Eerie, with the band claiming: "We felt the drums on 'No Flashlight' sounded good enough to listen to by themselves."

== Reception ==
Professional ratings
Aggregate scores
Source	Rating
Metacritic	72/100
Review scores
Source	Rating
Cokemachineglow	80%
Pitchfork	(5.0/10)
Portland Mercury	3.5/4 stars
Stylus	B
Tiny Mix Tapes	5/5 stars

"No Flashlight": Songs of the Fulfilled Night received generally positive reviews upon release. Metacritic, which assigns a normalized rating out of 100 to reviews from music critics, the album has received an average score of 72 based on 5 critics, indicating "generally favourable reviews". In a positive review Dom Sinacola of Cokemachineglow wrote that "No Flashlight doesn't sound much like a lullaby worth revisiting each night. Amazingly, Mount Eerie still crafts a series of passages that breathes, and walks, and enjoys a generous restraint." Zac Pennington and Adam Gnade of Portland Mercury wrote that "After releasing three consecutive records of masterfully progressive conceptual vision, Elverum's latest (as its title suggests) seems to be more about a search for something than a destination", "And though at times frustrating, it's the questions that keep me consistently coming back to No Flashlight. So Phil: what does Mount Eerie mean, anyway?"

In a review by Tiny Mix Tapes wrote that "Phil is obviously trying to communicate a particular message with little abstraction. He's taking this opportunity to share with us something special to him, and he's doing so in the most honest way he can." Elizabeth Newton of The Quietus praised the album writing that "Fluctuations in Elverum's persona, self-consciously sullen and wrung from second thoughts, ultimately add up to a stable whole because his tone remains so thoroughly distinctive" and that "Now more than ever, this music is laced with its maker's insistent worldview at every turn, and it's better for it."

A mixed review by Stylus wrote that "because Elvrum's philosophy is a rather muddled one (even with a surfeit explanation bordering on the absurd), it tends to take away from the album at key moments. Musical highlights like the beautifully hummed "How?" are weighed down by Elvrum's insistence on calling the visible world "the romance" or the unfortunate lyric "Because the pupil of my eye is a hole / There's no Inside and there's no Out / The world is in me and I am in the world" from the shimmering "No Inside, No Out.""

In a negative review, Sam Ubl of Pitchfork said that "Demanding listener input-- as Elverum does here by not-so-subtly inviting us to ponder him-- isn't a bad thing. But courting ears with such esoteric hooey is disingenuous and annoying" and that "he now makes boring music that is premised on his persona and the explanation thereof".

== Legacy ==
Eric Hill of Exclaim! Included the album in a ranking of Elverum's "essential" albums.

== Track listing ==
All tracks are written by Phil Elverum.

No.	Title	Length
1.	"I Know No One"	2:32
2.	"I Hold Nothing"	5:00
3.	"The Moan"	2:53
4.	"In the Bat's Mouth"	1:33
5.	"No Inside, No Out"	1:52
6.	"(2 Lakes)"	1:09
7.	"Stop Singing"	3:02
8.	"No Flashlight"	3:04
9.	"(2 Mountains)"	1:19
10.	"The Air in the Morning"	3:02
11.	"The Universe is Shown"	1:54
12.	"What?"	2:57
13.	"How?" (featuring Geneviève Castrée)	2:24
14.	"No Flashlight"	3:54
15.	"(2 Moons)"	1:16
Total length:		37:51

Japanese bonus tracks
No.	Title	Length
16.	"The Intimacy of the World with the World"	4:58
17.	"This is the Same Ocean"	0:45
18.	"Waterfalls" (featuring Adrian Orange)	2:04
19.	"Where"	1:17
Total length:		45.75

== Personnel ==
- Phil Elverum – lead vocals, songwriting, production, and engineering
- T Stollenwerk – mixing
- Genevieve Castree – guest artist
