= Mount Eerie pts. 6 & 7 =

EP by Mount Eerie
- Released: July 2007
- Recorded: Department of Safety
- Length: 24:27
- Label: P.W. Elverum & Sun, Ltd. (ELV 014)
- Producer: Phil Elverum

Mount Eerie chronology
Eleven Old Songs of Mount Eerie (2005)	Mount Eerie pts. 6 & 7 (2007)	Black Wooden Ceiling Opening (2008)

Mount Eerie pts. 6 & 7 is an EP released by Mount Eerie. This release acts as an extension to 2003's Mount Eerie, the fourth studio album by Phil Elverum's previous band The Microphones. It was released on a 10" picture disc packaged in a 132-page hardcover artbook of photography taken by Elverum.

== Music ==
In an interview with The Believer Elverum explained that the songs on Mount Eerie pts. 6 & 7 represent "the relationship between...the large mystery and the everyday" alongside being about "obliviousness v. clarity" and the "idea of “Mount Eerie” as a looming, invisible presence."

== Reception ==
Professional ratings
Review scores
Source	Rating
Pitchfork Media	(7.1/10)

Upon release, the EP received a generally positive reception. Matthew Solarski of Pitchfork wrote that "His apparent new mantra, more mature if less satisfying: Clarity comes and goes, and all we can be certain of is uncertainty."

== Track listing ==
All tracks are written by Phil Elverum.

Mount Eerie pt. 6
No.	Title	Length
1.	"Known World"	6:22
2.	"Unknown World"	5:29

Mount Eerie pt. 7
No.	Title	Length
3.	"Blue Light on the Floor"	4:50
4.	"Mount Eerie Revealed"	7:53
Total length:		24:27
