= SKL =

SKL can stand for:

- Seekriegsleitung (Naval Warfare Command), Germany (in WWI and WWII)
- Serine-lysine-leucine, a peroxisome targeting signal 1 in protein targeting
- AN/PYQ-10 Simple Key Loader
- Station code for Singaperumal Koil railway station (Tamil Nadu, India)
- Intel Skylake CPU microarchitecture product codename
- 1. SKL, Premier A Slovenian Basketball League
- 2. SKL, Slovenian Second Basketball League
- su.kaschenko.local, Russian FidoNet echo conference where Kashchenism originated
- Sumerian King List
- Suomen Kristillinen Liitto, historical name of the Christian Democrats political party in Finland
- Super Kabaddi League, Pakistan
