= Singers (album) =

Compilation album by Mount Eerie
- Released: September 6, 2005
- Recorded: 2000–2005
- Genre: Indie folk
- Length: 30:40
- Label: P. W. Elverum & Sun, Ltd. (ELV 002)
- Producer: Phil Elverum

Mount Eerie chronology
"No Flashlight": Songs of the Fulfilled Night (2005)	Singers (2005)	Eleven Old Songs of Mount Eerie (2005)

Singers is a compilation album by Phil Elverum. The album is often credited to Elverum's musical project Mount Eerie (and includes several songs which re-appear on other Mount Eerie releases), although the sleevenotes offer the following declaration: "This new band called "Singers" is born. This is the first album by Singers." The album features songs performed with a large group of singers (in some cases more than fifty individuals). The album was released on September 6, 2005.

== Recording ==
Recording took place over 5 years often during sessions for other projects at Dub Narcotic Studio in Olympia, WA. Performers on the album include Jason Anderson, Zac Pennington, Anna Oxygen, Geneviève Castrée, Adam Forkner, Kyle Field, Calvin Johnson, Adrian Orange, Khaela Maricich, Dennis Driscoll and Mirah.

== Reception ==
Professional ratings
Review scores
Source	Rating
Pitchfork Media	6.8/10

The album received a generally positive reception. Sam Ubl of Pitchfork wrote that "his words are whittled down to deep salience then removed from any discernible context and looped ad infinitum. What sounds meaningful reads like jabberwocky."

In a retrospective review, Daniel Bromfield of Spectrum Culture wrote that "as far as pure songwriting, it’s one of Elverum’s strongest collections," while observing that its treatment of death conflicts with that on his later albums: "It’s an example of the kind of writing about 'conceptual emptiness' Elverum angrily rebuked in his recent records, made in the wake of his wife Geneviève’s death from cancer in 2016."

== Track listing ==
All tracks are written by Phil Elverum.

No.	Title	Length
1.	"Let's Get Out of the Romance"	5:45
2.	"Ut-Oh! It's Mourning Time Again"	4:07
3.	"Do Not Be Afraid"	1:30
4.	"Where Is My Tarp?"	3:11
5.	"I Cut My Hands Off"	3:28
6.	"So Your Big Black Cloud Will Come"	1:11
7.	"Human"	5:09
8.	"I'll Shut Up"	1:20
9.	"I Can't Believe You Actually Died"	4:55
Total length:		30:40
