= Sauna (Mount Eerie album) =

2015 album by Mount Eerie

Studio album by Mount Eerie
- Released: February 3, 2015
- Recorded: June 27, 2013 – August 13, 2014
- Genres: Indie rock, experimental, ambient
- Length: 55:15
- Labels: P.W. Elverum & Sun, Ltd. (ELV 036)
- Producer: Phil Elverum

Mount Eerie chronology
| Pre-Human Ideas (2012) | Sauna (2015) | A Crow Looked at Me (2017) |

Mount Eerie studio album chronology
| Ocean Roar (2012) | Sauna (2015) | A Crow Looked at Me (2017) |

Sauna is the seventh full-length album by Mount Eerie. It was released on February 3, 2015.

== Concept ==
Upon announcing Sauna, Phil Elverum said that the album was inspired by "Vikings and zen and real life". On his label's website, Elverum had this to say about the title:

"The sauna that this album was inspired by is not a sauna that actually exists anywhere. It is about the idea of a small man-made wooden room crushed beneath a universe’s worth of bad weather; a concentration of extreme heat within a vast tough world. Inside this deliberate space a transformation occurs. The exaggerated atmosphere of flames, steam, smoke and dim light obliterate the usual sensations and new kinds of perception are exposed. Then the shocking plunge under cold water and the razor sword through sky."

"All of the song titles are single words and some of the songs are very long," he said in a press release, "This is music meant to weigh heavy on you like a lot of cold water at night, and also the sword glimmering at the bottom of the lake at night."

== Recording and release ==
The album was recorded between June 27, 2013 and August 13, 2014 at The Unknown, a church-turned recording studio in Anacortes, Washington.

Elverum began to first tease his new release by premiering a stripped-down version of the song "DRAGON" on the Pinball Sessions studio in Ontario, Canada. The video from this session was shared via the studio's website on September 16, 2014.

Phil Elverum announced the album through a series of teasers on his label's YouTube channel. Following that, he released a music video for two songs on the album, "THIS", and "SAUNA".

Sauna, after beginning production in 2013, was released on February 3, 2015. It exists on his Bandcamp page and was also released as a double LP, as well as a CD. Both the LP and CD are packaged containing photography done by Elverum.

== Reception ==
Professional ratings
Aggregate scores
| Source | Rating |
|---|---|
| AnyDecentMusic? | 7.6/10 |
| Metacritic | 82/100 |
Review scores
| Source | Rating |
| Allmusic | 3.5/5 stars |
| No Ripcord | 8/10 |
| Pitchfork Media | 8.1/10 |
| Magnet | 9/10 |
| The 405 | 9/10 |
| Tiny Mix Tapes | 3/5 marks |

Sauna received critical acclaim upon its release. At Metacritic, the album received an average score of 82 out of 100, based on 15 reviews, indicating "universal acclaim". Aggregator AnyDecentMusic? gave Sauna 7.6 out of 10, based on their assessment of the critical consensus.

In a review from No Ripcord Magazine stated that "Sauna not only proves itself to be one of Elverum’s most personal and intimate releases, it’s also one of his most artistically inspired as well," also commenting on its use of ambient music as a strong advancement in Elverum's use of setting to create mood, saying that "The crushing, almost melody-less ambience of Sauna might suggest that this is the album where Elverum goes fully native on us, with Elverum completely disappearing into the ether of the solitary natural world which has always been his fascination". However, the review also praises Sauna for its sense of intimacy.

Other critics have also praised Sauna for its use of setting. The 405 stated in their review that "Although it starts in a relaxing atmosphere, there is certainly an unease the underscores the album. 'Dragon' features gentle singing from a gathering of females, trading off lines with Elverum beautifully, until they are gradually drowned out by what sounds like a field recording of a jet overhead."

In a review from Tiny Mix Tapes, however, the album was criticized for its lyrics being too literal about the metaphors and images in which Elverum wrote about in his working, saying that "Perhaps with the sole exception of Don’t Smoke/Get Off the Internet, never before has Elverum’s work seemed so boldly transparent, so artificial". However, in another review by Pitchfork the lyrics were praised, saying that "There is something almost aggressively quotidian about the scenarios he paints, like an indie film that aims to test your patience for how little action constitutes a "motion picture." Coffee is poured, windows are gazed at pensively, tractors idle".

== Legacy ==
Eric Hill of Exclaim! Included the album in a ranking of Elverum's "essential" albums. Daniel Bromfield of Spectrum Culture wrote in 2019 that Sauna is "the last product of what could be called the Old Mount Eerie," noting how later releases took sharp new turns.

== Track listing ==
All tracks are written by Phil Elverum. All song titles are capitalized, with the exception of the song "(something)".

| No. | Title | Length |
|---|---|---|
| 1. | "Sauna" | 10:00 |
| 2. | "Turmoil" | 1:50 |
| 3. | "Dragon" | 3:15 |
| 4. | "Emptiness" | 3:23 |
| 5. | "(Something)" | 2:16 |
| 6. | "Boat" | 2:13 |
| 7. | "Planets" | 1:24 |
| 8. | "Pumpkin" | 5:12 |
| 9. | "Spring" | 13:21 |
| 10. | "Books" | 3:30 |
| 11. | "This" | 3:18 |
| 12. | "Youth" | 5:27 |
| Total length: | | 55:15 |

== Sauna (bonus tracks) ==
Sauna (bonus tracks)

Compilation album by Mount Eerie
- Released: February 3, 2015
- Genres: Indie folk, experimental
- Length: 13:01
- Labels: P.W. Elverum & Sun, Ltd.
- Producer: Phil Elverum

The Japanese edition of Sauna included a second disc, Sauna (bonus tracks), which contains four additional tracks. The tracks were recorded alongside the album and were made to organize and compose the vocal tracks for Allyson Foster and Ashley Eriksson as well as the flutes Evie Opp play on "This". The album cover is from Anna Riwkin-Brick's book "Nomads of the North", 1942.

=== Track listing ===
All tracks are written by Phil Elverum.

| No. | Title | Length |
|---|---|---|
| 1. | "Sauna (demo)" | 2:52 |
| 2. | "Spring (demo)" | 4:10 |
| 3. | "This (demo)" | 3:17 |
| 4. | "Dragon (demo)" | 2:42 |

== Personnel ==
The personnel of Sauna according to Mount Eerie's Bandcamp page and the liner notes of the albums LP release:

- Phil Elverum – guitar, vocals
- Geneviève Castrée – vocals
- Allyson Foster – vocals
- Ashley Eriksson – vocals
- Paul Benson – vocals
- Evin Opp – flutes
- Timothy Stollenwerk – mastering
