= Dawn (Mount Eerie album) =

Studio album by Mount Eerie
- Released: November 1, 2008
- Genre: Indie folk, lo-fi
- Length: 42:14
- Label: P. W. Elverum & Sun (ELV 017)
- Producer: Phil Elverum

Mount Eerie chronology
Lost Wisdom (2008)	Dawn (2008)	White Stag (2009)

Mount Eerie studio album chronology
Lost Wisdom (2008)	Dawn (2008)	Wind's Poem (2009)

Professional ratings
Review scores
Source	Rating
AllMusic	3.5/5 stars
Tiny Mix Tapes	4.5/5 stars
Sputnikmusic	4.5/5 stars

Dawn, also known as Dawn: Winter Journal, is the third full-length album by Mount Eerie. It was officially released November 1, 2008 on P. W. Elverum & Sun.

== Recording and release ==
The songs were all written by Phil Elverum during the winter of 2002–03, which he spent alone in a cabin in a remote part of Norway. The trip was inspired by a recent breakup and Elverum's growing disillusionment with the Bush administration.

The album was released on CD concurrently with a 144-page hardcover book and 16 colour photo cards. The book includes Elverum's journal entries and drawings from his Norway trip. The book is bound in paper that gives the feeling of wood. The album was also released as just an LP packaged with Elverum self-portraits drawn from the reflection of a window in the cabin in Norway Karl Blau also contributed engineering on the album.

== Music ==
Many of the songs appear on earlier releases by Mount Eerie. "Moon Sequel" is a follow-up to The Microphones' song "The Moon", and it carries the same melody. The song "Voice in Headphones" (which also appears on Lost Wisdom, released a month earlier) reprises the chorus from Björk's song "Undo", over a different verse. Elverum had previously covered Björk's "All Is Full of Love" on the 2001 Microphones album Blood. "The Dead of Night" was inspired by Elverum's experience with waking up during the night and the subsequent disorientation. He explained that the song is about the "idea of holding on to the memory of that mysterious black void while in the middle of the bright day."

== Track listing ==
All tracks are written by Phil Elverum.

No.	Title	Length
1.	"It Wasn't the Hunting"	2:49
2.	"Cold Mountain"	2:48
3.	"Moon Sequel"	2:29
4.	"I Have Been Told That My Skin Is Exceptionally Smooth"	1:32
5.	"I Say "No""	2:05
6.	"Moon, I Already Know"	1:20
7.	"With My Hands Out"	1:43
8.	"A Show of Hands"	1:46
9.	"Woolly Mammoth's Mighty Absence"	3:24
10.	"My Burning"	1:39
11.	"Great Ghosts"	3:07
12.	"Climb Over"	2:37
13.	"We Squirm"	1:29
14.	"Voice in Headphones"	1:52
15.	"Who?"	2:11
16.	"Dead of Night"	2:43
17.	"See Me"	1:57
18.	"Log in the Waves"	1:57
19.	"Goodbye Hope"	2:25
Total length:		42:14

== Personnel ==
- Phil Elverum – vocals, guitar
- Karl Blau – engineering
