= Ocean Roar =

Studio album by Mount Eerie
- Released: August 29, 2012
- Recorded: January 4, 2011, to February 21, 2012, at the Unknown in Anacortes, Washington
- Genre: Experimental rock, indie rock, noise, dark ambient
- Length: 38:43
- Label: P.W. Elverum & Sun, Ltd. (ELV 026/043)
- Producer: Phil Elverum

Mount Eerie chronology
Clear Moon (2012)	Ocean Roar (2012)	Live in Bloomington, September 30, 2011 (2013)

Mount Eerie studio album chronology
Clear Moon (2012)	Ocean Roar (2012)	Sauna (2015)

Ocean Roar is the sixth studio album by Mount Eerie, released on August 29, 2012. It is the second of two albums released by Mount Eerie in 2012.

== Recording and release ==
Ocean Roar is the second of two albums released by Mount Eerie in 2012. Phil Elvrum described Ocean Roar as a "counterpoint to the soft synth walls and landscape pondering of Clear Moon, presenting the opposite of that album’s clear glints of awareness: a total wall of blue-grey oceanic fog, a half remembered dream of a trip through dense old growth hills to the gnarly winter ocean, in the middle of the night, decades ago."

== Clear Moon / Ocean Roar (Condensed Versions) ==
On October 17, 2012, Phil released a 7-inch single entitled "Clear Moon / Ocean Roar (Condensed Versions)". Side B consists of all the songs on Ocean Roar played at once

== Reception ==
Professional ratings
Aggregate scores
Source	Rating
AnyDecentMusic?	7.8/10
Metacritic	85/100
Review scores
Source	Rating
Beats Per Minute	86%
Consequence of Sound	4/5 stars
Drowned in Sound	10/10
The Line of Best Fit	8.5/10
Mojo	4/5 stars
Pitchfork	8.1/10
PopMatters	8/10
Sputnikmusic	4/5
Tiny Mix Tapes	4/5 stars
Under the Radar	7.5/10

Ocean Roar received mostly positive reviews. At Metacritic, which assigns a normalized rating out of 100 to reviews from mainstream critics, the album received an average score of 85 based on 11 reviews, indicating "universal acclaim". Aggregator AnyDecentMusic? gave Ocean Roar 7.8 out of 10, based on their assessment of the critical consensus.

The album was listed 38th on Stereogum's list of the top 50 albums of 2012.

== Track listing ==
No.	Title	Length
1.	"Pale Lights"	9:59
2.	"Ocean Roar"	2:47
3.	"Ancient Times"	1:11
4.	"Instrumental"	5:32
5.	"Waves"	4:57
6.	"Engel Der Luft" (Popol Vuh cover)	3:15
7.	"I Walked Home Beholding"	4:05
8.	"Instrumental"	6:58
Total length:		38:43

"Engel Der Luft" is a cover of a Popol Vuh song from their soundtrack Fitzcarraldo.

== Legacy ==
American musician Andy Stack cites opening track "Pale Lights" as an influence, describing it as genius.
