= Mount Eerie =

American indie rock/folk band

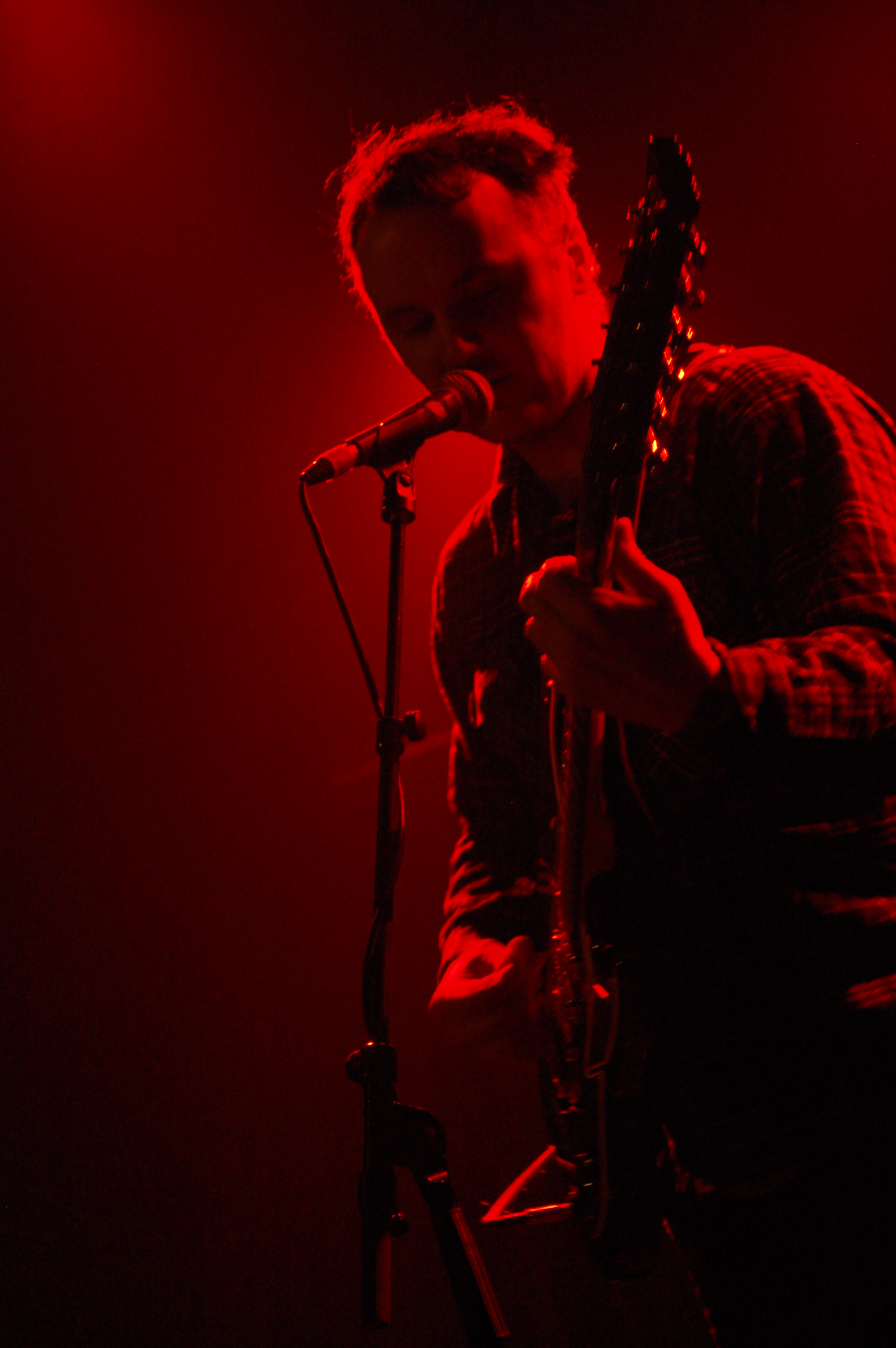
- Phil Elverum performing as Mount Eerie in March 2012

Background information
- Origin: Anacortes, Washington, U.S.
- Genres: Indie folk; indie rock; experimental; lo-fi
- Years active: 2003–present
- Labels: P.W. Elverum & Sun, Ltd.
- Members: Phil Elverum
- Website: pwelverumandsun.com

Mount Eerie is the musical project of American songwriter and producer Phil Elverum. Elverum (also of the Microphones) is the principal member of the band, but has collaborated with many other musicians on his records and in live performances. Most of Mount Eerie's releases have been issued on Elverum's label P.W. Elverum & Sun, Ltd., and feature highly detailed packaging with his own artwork.

== History ==
=== 2003–2005: Career beginnings ===
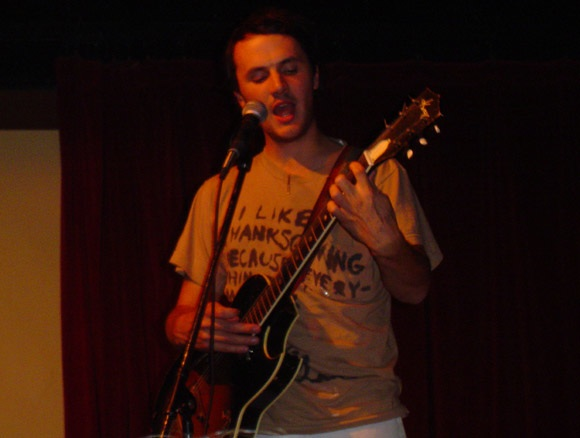
Elverum at UCLA in May 2004 (shortly after switching from The Microphones to Mount Eerie)

Following the release of the Microphones' Mount Eerie album, Elverum announced that he would no longer use the Microphones moniker, opting instead to record under the name Mount Eerie, after the area in Anacortes, Washington called Mount Erie. In an interview with CITR-FM's Discorder in September 2003, Elverum gave his reasons for this change: "Mount Eerie is a new project. The Microphones was completed, or at least at a good stopping point. I did it because I am ready for new things. I am new." Around this time, Elverum also changed the spelling of his own surname (previously, Elvrum).

The first Mount Eerie releases included a limited edition CD of new recordings (Seven New Songs), a 12" EP recorded live to acetate with local musicians during an Australian tour (Mount Eerie Dances with Wolves), and a live triple album released by Burnt Toast Vinyl in late 2004 (Live in Copenhagen).

Elverum returned to his hometown of Anacortes after spending several years living in Olympia, Washington whilst recording for K Records, and established his own label and imprint, P.W. Elverum & Sun, Ltd. The first official Mount Eerie studio album in Phil's eyes was No Flashlight, released in August 2005. The original pressing featured an extremely large fold-out sleeve with extensive footnotes and explanations. Following pressings of the album feature more simple packaging with the original liner notes and poster absent.

=== 2006–2015: Touring and further releases ===
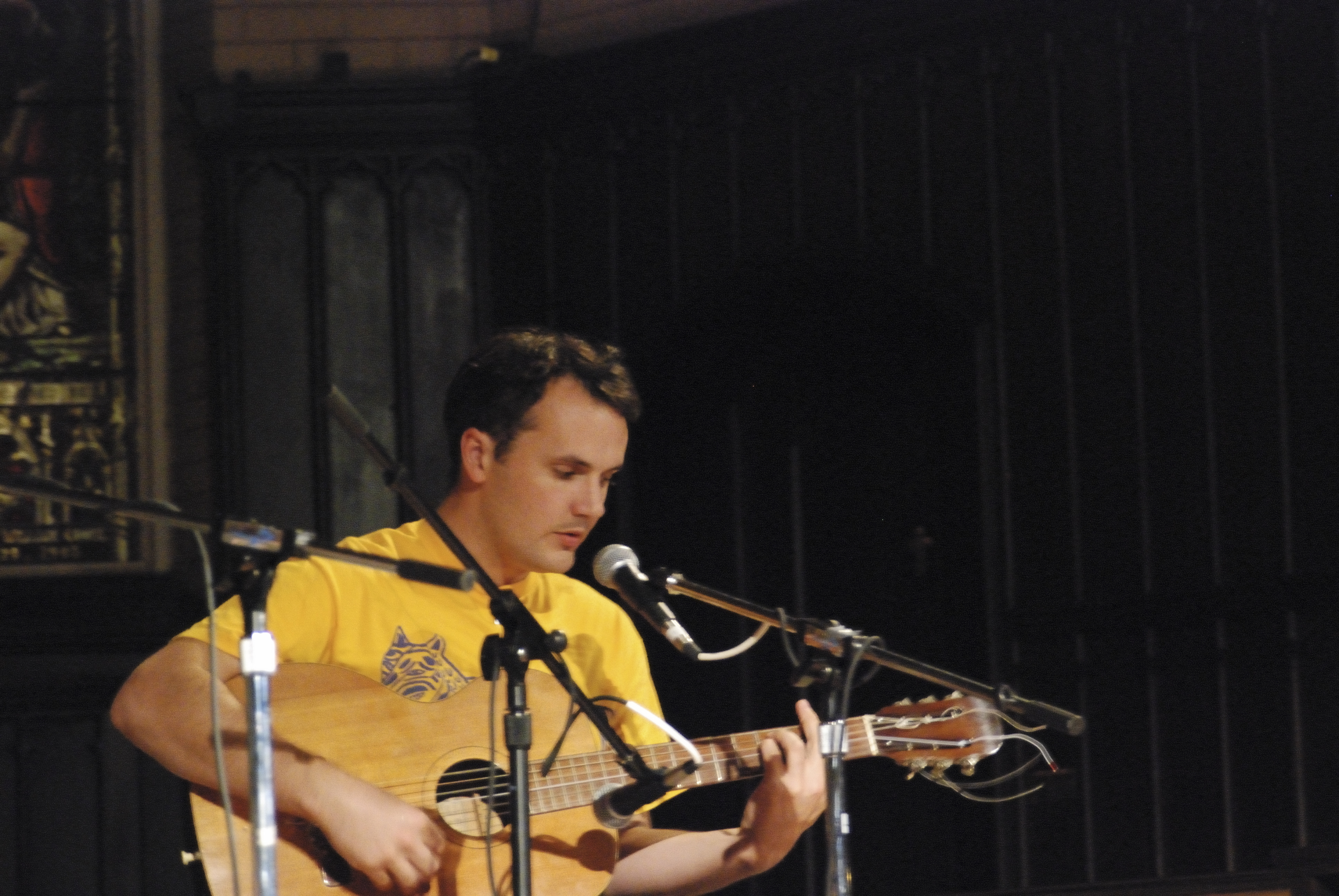
Elverum performing in 2008

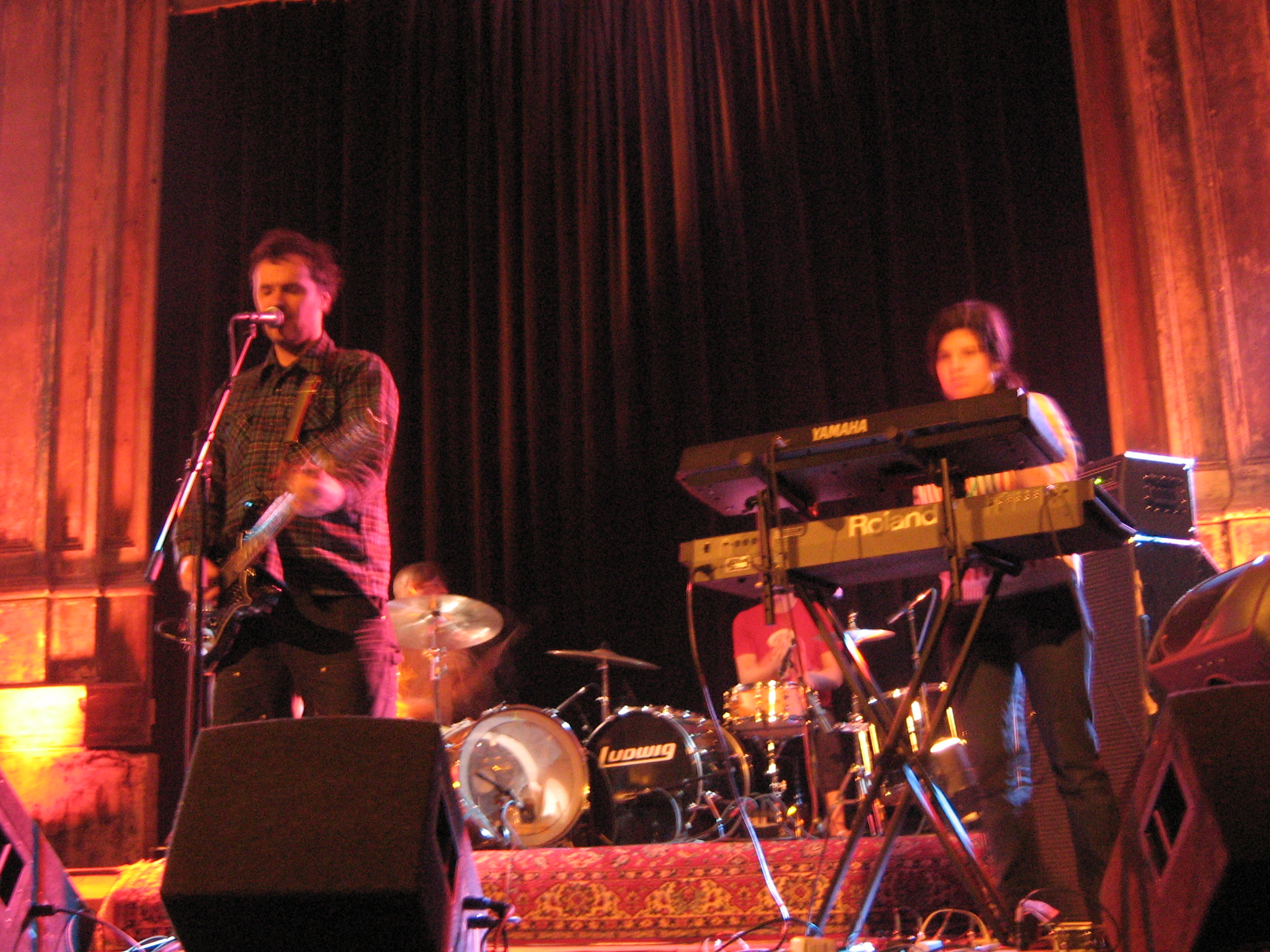
Elverum live in 2010

Elverum has continued to tour and record prolifically in recent years, to considerable critical acclaim. Noteworthy releases have included Mount Eerie pts. 6 & 7 (a hardcover coffee-table book of Elverum's photography, packaged with a 10" record), Lost Wisdom (recorded with Julie Doiron and Frederick Squire), and Wind's Poem (a black metal-influenced album, recorded with Nicholas Krgovich). In 2012, Elverum released two albums, Clear Moon and Ocean Roar. He was also chosen to perform at Jeff Mangum's All Tomorrow's Parties festival in Minehead, England. An admirer of Neutral Milk Hotel, he stated it was an "honor to be chosen." In 2013, Elverum was a part of the Primavera Sound line-up. A new Mount Eerie album entitled Sauna was released on February 2, 2015.

=== 2017–Present: A Crow Looked at Me, Now Only and Lost Wisdom Pt. 2 ===
In January 2017, the song "Real Death" was released from the forthcoming album A Crow Looked at Me. A second single, "Ravens", was released on February 15. The album was written and recorded in 2017 shortly following the death of Geneviève Castrée, Elverum's wife. On March 24, A Crow Looked at Me was released to high critical praise. Exclaim!'s Alex Hudson scored the album a 9 out of 10, calling the record an "emotionally nuanced meditation on death that is both heartbreaking and hopeful."

After touring North America in the summer of 2017, Elverum played songs from A Crow Looked at Me across Europe and Australasia. The second of these shows became (after), a live recording eventually released in September 2018 and was well received by Pitchfork who noted "the most striking thing about (after) is that, even after so many performances, these songs sound as raw as they did when Elverum first committed them to paper and tape".

In January 2018, the album Now Only was announced along with the release of the album track "Distortion". The album was officially released on March 16, 2018, to positive reviews, with The Atlantic describing the album as a progression from A Crow Looked at Me: "not an experience of total sadness, featuring flashes of irony, hope, and love".

On September 25, 2019, Elverum announced a sequel to his 2008 collaboration with Julie Doiron, Lost Wisdom, entitled Lost Wisdom Pt. 2. It was released on November 8, 2019. Two singles were released. On January 28, 2020, Elverum announced a North American tour in support of the album. That same week as the announcement Elverum toured through Canada with singer Angel Olsen. The tour was set to take place in April of that year with Julie Doiron accompanying him, however was cancelled and rescheduled to October 2020 due to the COVID-19 pandemic. Elverum also announced a show with Angel Olsen at Brooklyn's Prospect Park Bandshell on July 22.

In 2020, Mount Eerie appeared on a charity compilation album entitled The Song Is Coming from Inside the House, organized by indie rock band Strange Ranger in response to the COVID-19 pandemic. All proceeds from the album went to Groundswell's Rapid Response Fund, a charity intended to help "provide fast funding to grassroots organizations led by women of color, trans people of color, and low-income women and trans people." Elverum was also featured on the 20th anniversary reissue Mirah's debut album, You Think It’s Like This but Really It’s Like This; performing an "Of Pressure" cover.

In January 2023, Elverum released "Huge Fire," a new song that appeared on the compilation album Colors to commemorate the 20th anniversary of the Japanese label 7e.p. The track was written and recorded in the month prior to its release. The song marks his first original release since 2020's Microphones in 2020 and his first release under the Mount Eerie moniker since 2019. In November 2024, Elverum released the album Night Palace to positive reception.

== Artistry ==
Elverum's music under the Mount Eerie moniker expresses a close relationship to nature and the Pacific Northwest, in particular the minute details. Early Mount Eerie albums often discussed how "the distinction between wild and not wild is an illusion". In a 2014 interview, Elverum discussed how his choice for moniker coming from a mountain in Anacortes was a way of infusing a sense of regional connection between the music and the place.

His lyrical matter has been seen by some to be more introspective than his work before the name change. Brady Baker of Spectrum Culture called Mount Eerie "a solid foundation for an ever-expanding lyrical labyrinth that centers on his introspective philosophy." Eric Hill of Exclaim! believed the opposite, writing that Elverum's work under the Mount Eerie title is more "universal and, at times, hermetic."

Elverum also believed that the songs under Mount Eerie were more universal describing them as "this one long chain, about the idea of singing from the point of view of this dark looming mountain shape, while Microphones songs, historically, have been more personally narrative, maybe more human." After the death of Elverum's wife, Geneviève Castrée, in 2016 his lyrics became more direct and plainspoken.

Musically, Elverum has experimented with "black metal, lo-fi krautrock, fuzzy post-rock textures and Auto-Tune experimentation". My Bloody Valentine, George Gurdjieff and black metal have all been cited by Elverum as influences on the project.

== Reception ==
Kerrang! included Mount Eerie on their list of 10 non-metal artists enjoyed by metal fans.

== Discography ==
=== Studio albums ===
- "No Flashlight": Songs of the Fulfilled Night (2005)
- Lost Wisdom (2008)
- Dawn (2008)
- Wind's Poem (2009)
- Clear Moon (2012)
- Ocean Roar (2012)
- Sauna (2015)
- A Crow Looked at Me (2017)
- Now Only (2018)
- Lost Wisdom pt. 2 (2019)
- Night Palace (2024)

=== EPs and other albums ===
- Seven New Songs of "Mount Eerie" (2004)
- Live in Copenhagen (2004)
- Mount Eerie Dances with Wolves (2004)
- The Drums from "No Flashlight" by Mt. Eerie (2005)
- Singers (2005)
- Eleven Old Songs of Mount Eerie (2005)
- Nobody's Perfect (2005)
- Mount Eerie pts. 6 & 7 (2007)
- Black Wooden Ceiling Opening (2008)
- White Stag (2009)
- Black Wooden (2009)
- Daytrotter Session (2010)
- Song Islands vol. 2 (2010)
- LOST WISDOM live at Gunjyo, March 12th, 2010 (2012)
- the LAST HIT (soundtrack) (2013)
- Live in Seattle, Sept. 7th, 2013 (2013)
- Live in Bloomington, September 30, 2011 (2013)
- Pre-Human Ideas (2013)
- Sauna (bonus tracks) (2015)
- (after) (2018)

=== Singles ===
- "2 Songs" (2005)
- "In The World/I Love You Guys (slow)" (2005)
- "I Whale" (2006)
- "Prisoner of Desire/Through the Trees (excerpt)" (2008)
- "Alphabet Series Ö 7"" (2012)
- "To The Ground/The Mouth Of Sky (M.I.D.I. Strings)" (2012)
- "World Heaves 7"" (2012)
- "Distorted Cymbals/Angelpoise Cymbals" (2012)
- "World Heaves b/w Engel der Luft (Popol Vuh) (version)" (2012)
- "The Place Lives (version)/The Place I Live (version)" (2012)
- "Clear Moon/Ocean Roar (Condensed Versions)" (2012)
- "Live With Odeon Quartet" (2013)
- "Emptiness (version)" (2014)
- "Real Death" (2017)
- "Ravens" (2017)
- "Distortion" (2018)
- "Tintin in Tibet" (2018)
- "Soria Moria (live)" (2018)
- "2 remixes by Wolves in the Throne Room" (2018)
- "(fireworks & wind)" (2019)
- "Love Without Possession" (2019)
- "Belief Pt. 2" (2019)
- "I Walk" (2024)
- "Broom of Wind (2024)

=== Guest appearances ===
- "The Song Is Coming from Inside the House" (2020)
