= Clear Moon =

Album by Mount Eerie

Studio album by Mount Eerie
- Released: May 22, 2012
- Recorded: October 3, 2010 – January 7, 2012
- Studio: the Unknown, Anacortes, Washington
- Genre: Indie rock, experimental
- Length: 41:42
- Label: P.W. Elverum & Sun, Ltd. (ELV 025/043)
- Producer: Phil Elverum

Mount Eerie chronology
Song Islands vol. 2 (2010)	Clear Moon (2012)	Ocean Roar (2012)

Mount Eerie studio album chronology
Wind's Poem (2009)	Clear Moon (2012)	Ocean Roar (2012)

Singles from Clear Moon
- 1. "House Shape" Released: March 22, 2012; 2. "Lone Bell" Released: April 24, 2012

Clear Moon is the fifth studio album by Mount Eerie, a solo project by American musician Phil Elverum. It was released May 22, 2012 on Elverum's own label P.W. Elverum & Sun. The album was written and produced entirely by Elverum, who recorded it at his studio the Unknown.

Musically, Clear Moon sees Elverum depart from the distortion-heavy sound of his previous studio album, Wind's Poem, in favour of a hypnotic, guitar and synthesizer based sound. To promote the album, Elverum released two singles, "House Shape" on March 22, 2012, and "Lone Bell" on April 24, 2012. Elverum also embarked on North American/European tours.

Clear Moon received critical acclaim and was commercially successful. It is the first part of an aesthetically and conceptually connected duo of albums released by Mount Eerie in 2012, the other being Ocean Roar.

== Recording and composition ==
Clear Moon is the first of two albums released by Mount Eerie in 2012, the other being Ocean Roar. Both albums are aesthetically and conceptually connected and represent a "transition from day-to-day." Elverum chose not to release Clear Moon and Ocean Roar as a double album as he felt that it was too much for listeners to take in and that such a release would be too similar to his previous studio albums.

The album initially came from Elverum experimenting with instruments such as a gong and organs and use of the space within sound during winter months. Most of the aforementioned experimentations were discarded, however some were eventually developed and were placed into 2 distinct groups: Clear Moon and Ocean Roar. The songs that were chosen for Clear Moon were based on if they evoked "sharp clarity". The album was recorded on analogue equipment from October 3, 2010, to January 7, 2012, in Anacortes, Washington at Elverum's studio the Unknown. Elverum described the recording process as:

...spending days and days fucking around and trying things, moving it a little bit, accidentally leaving the mic on and hearing the tape rewinding through the speaker echoing through the room, recording that sound onto another piece of tape, pitching it down, putting it with this other thing, spending two days pursuing this weird possibility only to realize it sucks.

Said studio was an overarching influence on the development of the album. Elverum cites Burzum, Eihei Dōgen, Gary Snyder, Cold Mountain and zen poetry as an influence on the album. Other influences include Popol Vuh, Wolves in the Throne Room, Menace Ruine, and Nadja.

== Music and lyrics ==
Musically, Clear Moon is a departure from Elverum's previous studio album, the distortion-heavy Wind's Poem; replacing the heavy guitars for "ominous rumbling and isolated feedback squalls." Described as "lush and expansive," the album is predominantly guitar-based, featuring downplayed vocals, droning organs, 4/4 drum beats, chimes and "overlapping, hypnotic guitar lines." The album takes inspiration from multiple genres such as psychedelia, folk, chamber, electronic, ambient and metal. Themes of solitude, which Elverum presents through the imagery of the moon, a recurring motif in the album and his work at large, and maturity are present, with the album seeing Elverum exploring new avenues of his established sound and lyrical content. According to Thomas May the songs on Clear Moon are the most melodically dynamic he has created since The Glow Pt. 2. Tonally, the album is clearer and lighter than Ocean Roar, while still retaining Elverum's typical dark style, and has more extensive use of synthesizer and vocals. The range of tempo is diverse throughout the record.

Lyrically, the songs makes reference to existentialism, the artificiality of being an artist, Elverum's relation to nature, his life in Anacortes, Washington and "the unexpected moments of clarity that briefly flash through." Narratively, it expands on the story first introduced in the final Microphones studio album at the time, Mount Eerie, and sees Elverum traverse the ocean and undergo a metaphorical rebirth. Elverum described the album as a "resonant lone bell symbol, the glint in the water, the sudden breath" and as an "abstract non-narrative diary" exploring his mental state.

Philosophical in nature, the quite, melodic, drum- and acoustic guitar-driven, folk jazz, opening track "Through the Trees Pt. 2" has Elverum calmly singing about "nature, life and death, [and] the inherent pointlessness of existence." As the song goes on more instrumentation such as additional percussion, piano resonant strings and bells are added. The song also make use of ambient noise, Elverum's "trademark" humor and stereo panning with the guitars utilising the left and right speakers.

"The Place Lives" explores humanity's relation and ultimate insignificance to the world at large in a lyrical manner akin to Japanese poetry. Instruments such as piano and cymbals are present on the song. Reminiscent of the sound of Earth, the third song "The Place I Live" is a "hymn-like ode to Anacortes". It begins with a single bass guitar before synthesizer, electric guitar and vocals by Allyson Foster are soon incorporated, concluding in a near-grunge manner. It also features feedback, strings, drums, a "heart beat pulse" and double tracking on the guitar. Elverum and Foster sing in a call-and-response manner. Foster is also featured on "Through the Trees Pt. 2". The fourth and eighth tracks, both entitled "(something)", serve as instrumental interludes, dividing the album into three distinct sections.

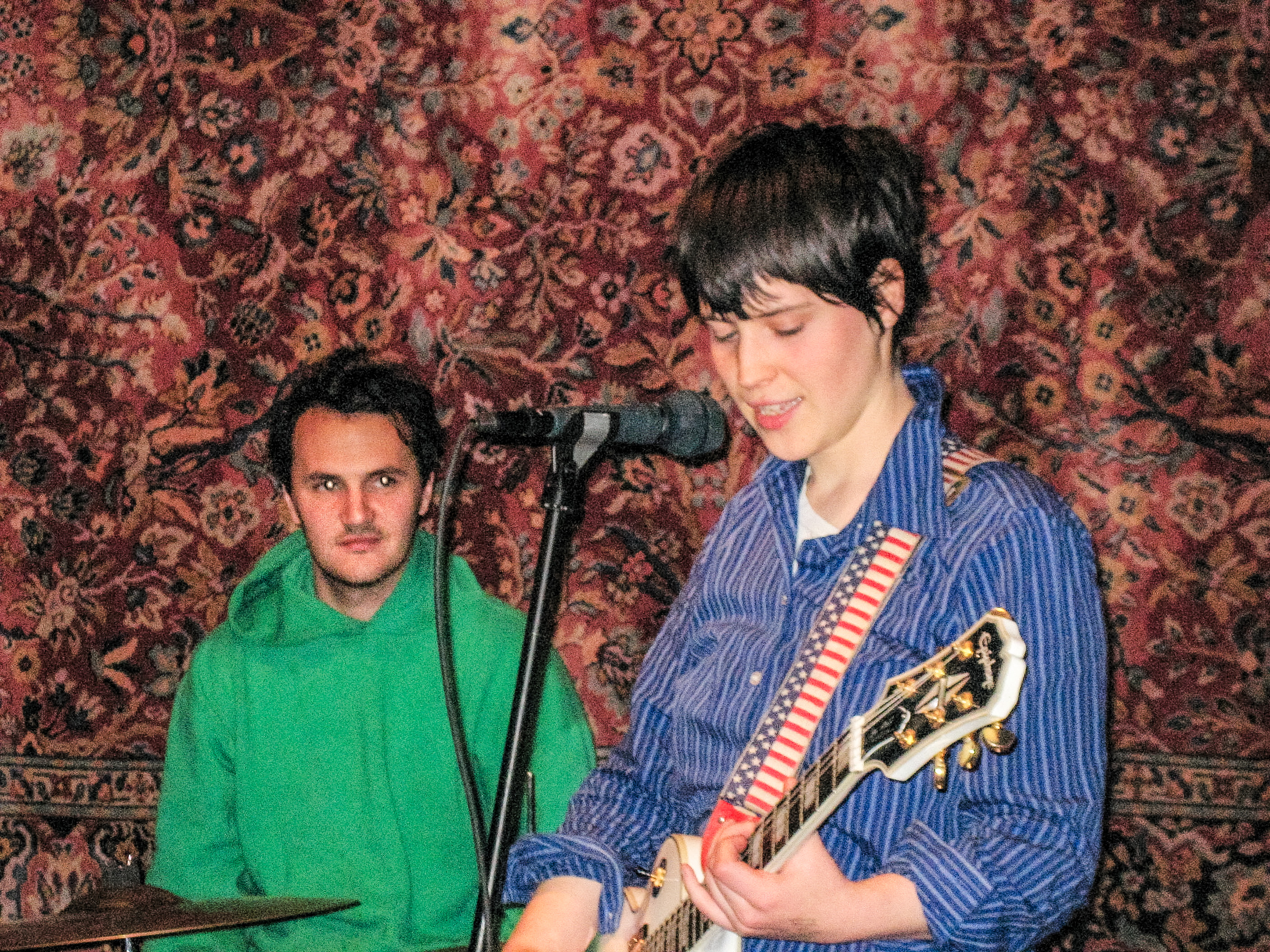
Elverum and Castrée, who is featured on "Over Dark Water", performing together in 2006.

"Lone Bell" is a jazz-like noise rock song, composed of processed vocals, piano, saxophone accents, snare drum brushes, bass and "metal" riffs and two repeating droning chords. Utilising space and repetition in a manner similar to that of Neu!, "House Shape" features a pump organ, detuned acoustic guitars, strings, keyboard, drums and elements of shoegaze. According to Elverum, "Lone Bell" and House Shape" are fairly indicative of the sound of Clear Moon.

"Over Dark Water" is a gothic, doom metal "anti-hymn to night and nothingness" which features choral singing from Geneviève Castrée. It is composed of drums, synthesized strings, organ, bass guitar and distorted electric guitar and synthesized bass played in unison. The song concludes with a drum-heavy black metal climax.

Described as the climax of the album, the cacophonous title track features manipulated—vocoder-like—vocals from Elverum alongside additional vocals from Carson Churchill and Paul Benson. It also features "hum-like" bass, synthesizer, cymbals, keyboards chants and bells. "Yawning Sky" is an ambient track with lyrical themes of man's frailty and mortality and keyboards and guitar. "(Synthesizer)" is an instrumental new-age song which Elverum described as an "extreme exaggeration of what [the] album is."

== Release ==
The first track released from Clear Moon, "House Shape", was released on March 22, 2012, on SoundCloud. The second track released from the album was "Lone Bell," released on April 24, 2012, on SoundCloud. On May 13, 2012, the album was streamed in its entirety on NPR Music. On July 31, 2012, Elverum released his first music video through Pitchfork TV for “The Place Lives”. It is composed of footage of Elverum traversing Oregon woods, brewing a pot of tea, and pouring that tea into the dirt. Stereogum chose it as one of the best videos of the week of its release.

== Touring ==
In support of the album, Elverum embarked on a tour of Europe from March 2012 to April 2012. Elverum was accompanied by Earth and Ô PAON. This was succeeded by a North American tour from August 2012 to October 2012. Elverum was accompanied by Loren Mazzacane Connors and Bouquet as well as a live band consisting of a drummer, a bass player, two guitarists, a keyboardist and three singers.

== Clear Moon / Ocean Roar (Condensed Versions) ==
On October 17, 2012, Phil released a 7-inch single entitled "Clear Moon / Ocean Roar (Condensed Versions)". Side A consists of all the songs on Clear Moon played at once.

== Reception ==
Professional ratings
Aggregate scores
Source	Rating
AnyDecentMusic?	7.9/10
Review scores
Source	Rating
AllMusic	4/5 stars
The A.V. Club	B
Consequence of Sound	B
No Ripcord	8/10
Pitchfork	8.3/10
Spin	8/10
Sputnikmusic	4.5/5 stars
Tiny Mix Tapes	4.5/5 stars
Under the Radar	7/10

Clear Moon received mostly positive reviews from music critics. Aggregator AnyDecentMusic? gave Clear Moon 7.9 out of 10, based on their assessment of the critical consensus.

Heather Phares of AllMusic wrote that "Elverum's meditation on the fact that life goes on within you and without you is thoughtful and thorough in a way few other songwriters could manage". David Greenwald of The A.V. Club found that album was "meaningful without feeling personal" and that it was a "thunderous effort". Sean Caldwell of No Ripcord wrote that "Elverum’s utilization of metallic and avant-garde elements into what might otherwise be considered a folk album demonstrates a songwriter unlimited by genre and also turned on by creative possibility".

Jayson Greene of Pitchfork wrote that "the album's sound, meanwhile has the misty-but-tactile feeling of a sense memory. Every sound echoes from side to side of the mix, and the effect isn't so much "panning" as it is a shimmering omnipresence". "kingsoby1" of Sputnikmusic wrote the following: "The impressive thing about Clear Moon though is how truly organically rooted it is. The recording is still lo-fi, but not such that there is a lapse in quality. Elverum's recording techniques really enhance the compositions". Joe Clinkenbread of Spectrum Culture despite liking the album found it hard to judge the album on its own and described some songs such as "Lone Bell" and both "(Something)" songs as underwhelming.

The album was also commercially successful selling out its first pressing almost immediately.

=== Accolades ===
The Tyee called it one of the best albums of the year.

== Legacy ==
Donovan Farley of Willamette Week chose "The Place I Live" and "Through the Trees Pt. 2" as two of Elverum's "essential" songs. Eric Hill of Exclaim! Included the album in a ranking of Elverum's "essential" albums. A version of "Lone Bell" was used as the lead single for Elverum's album "Pre-Human Ideas".

== Track listing ==
All tracks are written by Phil Elverum.

No.	Title	Length
1.	"Through the Trees Pt. 2"	5:50
2.	"The Place Lives"	2:42
3.	"The Place I Live"	5:58
4.	"(Something)"	1:31
5.	"Lone Bell"	4:15
6.	"House Shape"	4:03
7.	"Over Dark Water" (featuring Geneviève Castrée)	3:06
8.	"(Something)"	0:30
9.	"Clear Moon"	7:20
10.	"Yawning Sky"	3:28
11.	"(Synthesizer)"	2:59
Total length:		41:42
