= Lori Goldston =

American musician

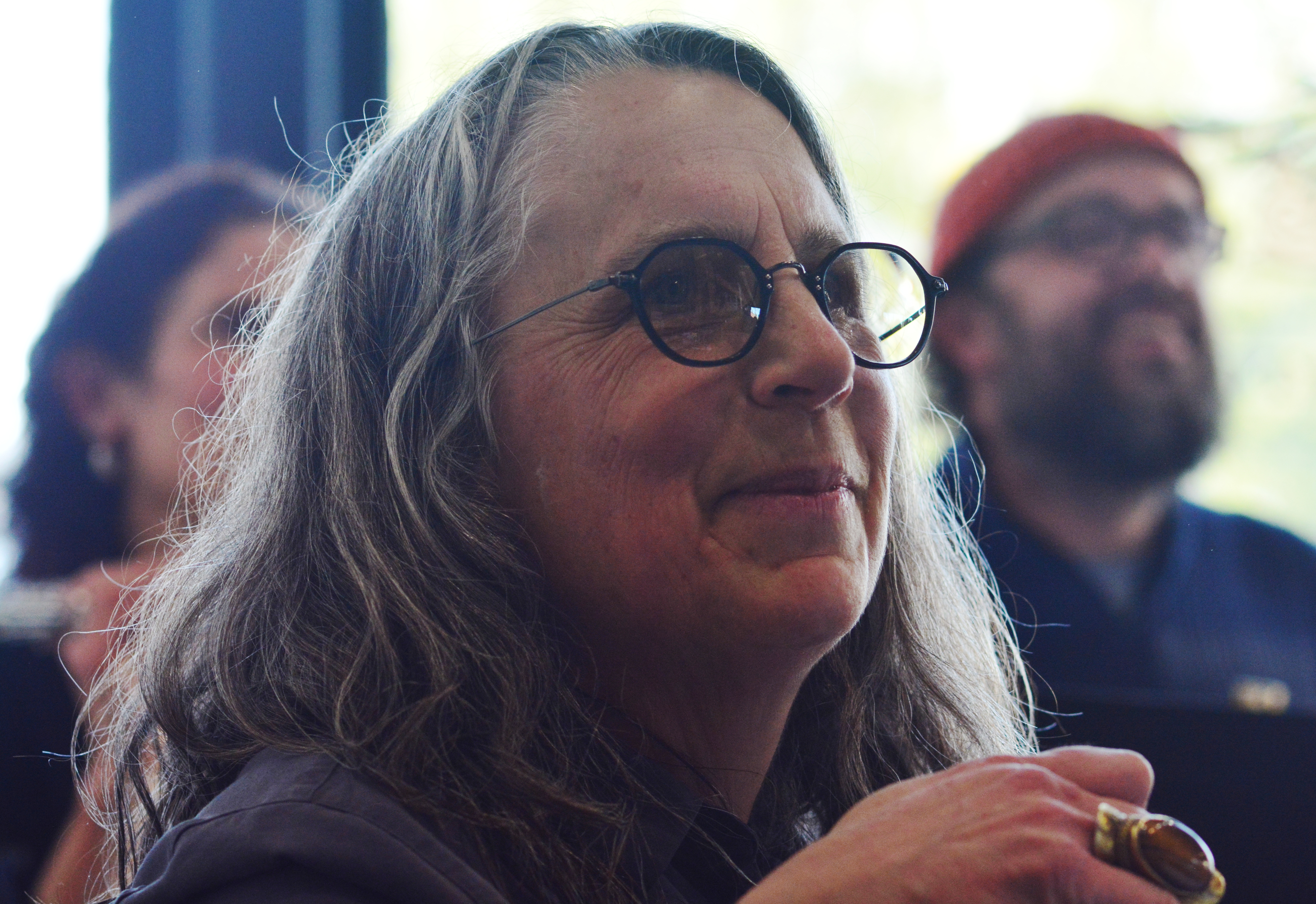
- Goldston in 2024

Background information
- Born: 1963 or 1964 (age 62–63)
- Genres: Classical; world; rock; film score; free improvisation
- Occupations: Musician; songwriter; artist
- Instruments: Cello; guitar; voice
- Years active: 1983–present
- Labels: Sub Rosa; Mississippi; Sub Pop; DGC/Geffen; Irene Records; Yoyo Recordings; K Records; Substrata

Lori Goldston (born 1963 or 1964) is an American cellist and composer. Accomplished in a wide variety of styles, including classical, world music, rock and free improvisation, she came to prominence as the touring cellist for Nirvana from 1993–1994 and appears on their live album MTV Unplugged in New York. She was a member of Earth, the Black Cat Orchestra, and Spectratone International, and also performs solo.

== Career ==
=== Training and early bands (1970s–1991) ===
Raised in the Long Island town of East Meadow, Goldston received training on cello, guitar, piano, and voice. She studied cello with Aaron Shapinsky, and guitar with Bob Suppan and Joe Monk. At Bennington College, Goldston trained with Maxine Neuman, Milford Graves, Arthur Brooks, Vivian Fine, and Frank Baker. Goldston dropped out before attaining a degree and would later describe herself as “rigorously detrained.”

In 1986, Goldston moved to Seattle. Through the late eighties, Goldston performed with the Run/Remain Ensemble, a multimedia collaboration with Dayna Hanson, Kyle Hanson, Greg Lachow, and Megan Murphy.

In 1989, Goldston co-founded the Black Cat Orchestra, with Don Crevie on horn, Scott Granlund on saxophone, Jessika Kenney on vocals, and Goldston's partner and fellow Run/Remain alum Kyle Hanson on accordion.

=== Nirvana's MTV Unplugged session and studio recordings (1993–1994) ===
In the mid-nineties, Goldston rose to prominence in the Pacific Northwest music scene as a session cellist, notably joining Nirvana on a US tour and appearing on their famous MTV Unplugged in New York set. Through the nineties and early millennium, Goldston played on dozens of studio albums. Meanwhile, with the Black Cat Orchestra, she toured and recorded for prominent national acts, including David Byrne (on his 1997 album Feelings), the One Reel Film Festival (at that time under the aegis of Bumbershoot), and NPR's This American Life. In 1996, the group recorded and independently released a self-titled debut album. They followed it in 2001 with Mysteries Explained, co-produced with Irene Records, and then and Long Shadows at Noon from Yoyo Recordings (2003).

=== Later bands and collaborations with Mirah (2003–2015) ===
In 2003, Goldston and Hanson entered the first of many collaborations with then-Portland-based artist Mirah. The Black Cat Orchestra teamed up with Mirah for the political album To All We Stretch the Open Arm. Goldston's group disbanded in 2004, but soon after, she and Hanson founded Spectratone International. Goldston and Hanson reprised their roles on cello and accordion, respectively. They were joined by Kane Mathis on oud, Jane Hall on percussion, and Darko Vukmanic on bass. With Spectratone International, Goldston's rejoined Mirah for the 2007 album Share This Place: Stories and Observations. For the project, Goldston commissioned stop-motion animator Britta Johnson to make short films for the band to perform against live; Share This Place premiered at the 2006 Seattle International Children's Festival and was performed throughout the US, including the Kennedy Center, Museum of Fine Arts, Portland Institute for Contemporary Art's TBA Festival, Henry Art Gallery, and What the Heck Fest. Goldston has also appeared as a solo artist on Mirah's recent albums (a)spera (2009) and Changing Light (2014).

In 2005, Goldston formed another ensemble, Instead Of, with Angelina Baldoz (trumpet, flute, and bass), Jaison Scott (drums), and Torben Ulrich (text and vocals). The group independently released the album Live on Sonarchy in 2007. By 2009, Goldston was also regularly touring and recording with Earth. She appeared on their two-part Angels of Darkness, Demons of Light (2011, 2012), but by 2015, Goldston had left the band to pursue independent projects.

=== Solo work ===
As a solo artist, Goldston has recorded and performed around the country and the world. Her work is often eclectic, irreverent, and genre-bending. She has appeared as a voiceover artist on The Dina Martina Holiday Album (playing the role of Martina's eleven-year-old daughter Phoebe); and composed a suite of solo cello work in response to Melinda Mueller's poetry collection Mary’s Dust. She has also worked on numerous dramas, and as a co-creator (with Stacey Levine and Goldston's partner Kyle Hanson) of the puppet opera The Wreck of the St. Nikolai (2003) for On the Boards and the radio play The Post Office.

Goldston has worked on performances with composers including Eyvind Kang, Jherek Bischoff, Cynthia Hopkins, Malcolm Goldstein, Matana Roberts, Terry Riley, Eddie Prevost, Steve Moore, Bob Marsh, Olivia Block, Byron Au Yong, Erin Jorgensen, Bill Horist, Threnody Ensemble, Scott Fields, Christian Asplund, and Julio Lopezhiler. She has ongoing and/or long-term collaborations with Jessika Kenney, Robert Jenkins (a.k.a. Buzz Gundersen), Paul Hoskin, Ellen Fullman, Angelina Baldoz, Ed Pias, Vanessa Renwick, Greg Campbell, Stuart Dempster, Dan Sasaki, and Clyde Petersen.

With an emphasis on improvisational work, Goldston has composed on-the-spot in performances with Lonnie Holley, Vratislav Brabenec, Ilan Volkov, Amy Denio, Thollem McDonnas, Mazen Kerbaj, Marika Anderson, Dan Peek, Balász Pándi, Kanako Pooknyw, Stuart Dempster, Dana Reason, Mary Oliver, and Jaap Blonk.

From 2015 to 2017, Goldston traveled to Tel Aviv, Athens, and Glasgow for the Tectonics Festival, culminating in a composition for the BBC Scottish Symphony.

Goldston has been commissioned by numerous established arts organizations, including performing arts companies like On the Boards, Portland Institute for Contemporary Art's Time-Based Art (TBA) Festival, the Degenerate Art Ensemble; and art institutions such as the Frye Art Museum, the Seattle Asian Art Museum, the New Foundation, and the Henry Art Gallery.

Numerous theaters, film organizations, and dance companies have commissioned Goldston to compose scores including the Olympia Film Society, the Rebecca Stenn Dance Company, 33 Fainting Spells, Seattle Jewish Film Festival, and the Regenbogen Kino in Germany. Numerous of these commissions, including those for Bumbershoot's One Reel Film Festival, Northwest Film Forum, and Seattle International Film Festival, have included composing scores for early silent films. In 2001, Goldston collaborated with filmmaker Lynn Shelton on “Our Round Earth” for On the Boards's Northwest New Works Festival and in 2009 scored Shelton's feature film Humpday. She has collaborated extensively with choreographer Peter Kyle composing for dance pieces. She has also contributed to numerous film scores, including the 2016 stop-motion film Torrey Pines and the documentaries Water Is Life and Where the House Was. In 2013, Goldston released a solo album of such work, entitled Film Scores, through the Sub Rosa record label.

In January 2017, Goldston was commissioned to compose and perform a solo acoustic cello score for Étude's Paris Fashion Week runway show. The score was recorded at the Paris Red Bull studio and released as a limited edition LP by Ed Banger.

Goldston did a solo set at the Le Guess Who? musical festival in Utrecht, Netherlands in 2021.

== Musical style and influences ==
Goldston is known in large part for her improvisational work. Her work in cello is notable for a disorienting emphasis on pizzicato, which Goldston has said stemmed from attempts to play her cello like a guitar. Goldston has been heavily influenced by Western classical music and folk tunes, citing the Folkways folk and ethnographic records as childhood touchstones and Arnold Schoenberg, Toru Takemitsu, John Cage, George Crumb, Olivier Messiaen, and Carl Maria von Weber as influences later in her life. Though not a jazz musician, Goldston has studied and listened to jazz extensively, particularly Eric Dolphy, Wes Montgomery, John Coltrane, Charles Mingus, Thelonious Monk, Albert Ayler, and Pharoah Sanders. At the award ceremony for her 2012 Genius Award for Music, Goldston handed the orchestra written directions on how to follow her rather than sheet music, a move she traced back to Ornette Coleman. The Stranger said that "listening to her was not entirely an earthbound experience [...] the music could only be described as a storm or flock of sound."

Goldston draws on musical styles from around the world. She has performed as a member of the Seattle Turkish Music Ensemble and Seattle Chinese Orchestra, Volunteer Park Conservatory Orchestra, with Turkish Sufi singer Latif Bolat, Brazilian music with guitarist Marco De Carvalho, Japanese 20th-century and classical repertoire with Elizabeth Falconer, Klezmer music with Jack Falk, Lev Lieberman, Sandra Layman, Hank Bradley and Cathy Whitesides.

== Discography ==
Goldston has appeared on a number of albums, both for her own bands and as a session musician.

=== Solo and ensemble albums ===
- Mysteries Explained by Black Cat Orchestra (2001)
- Long Shadows at Noon by Black Cat Orchestra (2003)
- To All We Stretch the Open Arm by Mirah and the Black Cat Orchestra (2003)
- Share This Place: Stories and Observations by Mirah and Spectrone International (2007)
- Live on Sonarchy by Instead Of (2007)
- Angels of Darkness, Demons of Light I by Earth (2011)
- The Lichens in the Trees / Moss on the Ground (solo album) (2012)
- Angels of Darkness, Demons of Light II by Earth (2012)
- Film Scores (solo album) (2013)
- creekside: solo cello (solo album) (2014)
- The Seawall with Dan Sasaki (2017)
- Études No. 11 (solo album) (2017)
- Things Opening (solo LP on Second Editions) (2019)
- Feral Angel with Dylan Carlson (2021)
- Ô by various artists (2021). Goldston contributed the first track, "Fleuve iii." Compiled by Ô Paon, Geneviève Castrée's music project.
- Punk Equinox with Stefan Christoff (2022)

=== Appearances on compilation albums ===
- Give the People What We Want: The Songs of the Kinks electric guitar on "Art Nice and Gentle" (2001)
- This American Life: Stories of Hope & Fear "Seum Ma" with the Black Cat Orchestra (2006)
- The 1st Seattle Festival of Improvised Music cello on four tracks, with Paul Hoskin, Charley Rowan, Wall Shoup et al. (2010)
- Below the Radar 17 solo track "Tide" on album for UK publication The Wire (2012)
- Mind the Gap solo improvisation on album for Gonzo Circus magazine (2013)
- Sub Pop 1000 solo track "Tangled North" for Seattle record company Sub Pop (2013)
- Torrey Pines: Official Soundtrack "Beauty and the Beast" with Zach Burba (2016)

=== Appearances as a session musician ===
- MTV Unplugged in New York, live album by Nirvana (1994)
- Peace Wave by Don Glenn (1996)
- Skinwalkers by Skinwalkers (1996)
- Shugg vs. Cockpit: A Bittersweet Team Up of Bands Vol. 2 by Shugg (1996)
- You Can Be Low by Mavis Piggott (1996)
- No More Medicine by Citizens' Utilities (1996)
- Octoroon by Laura Love (1997)
- Feelings by David Byrne (1997)
- Fulcrum by Sue Ann Harkey (1997)
- Wigwam Bendix by Craig Flory/Doug Haire (1998)
- Release the Butterfly by Carrie Clark (1999)
- Metal Shed Blues by Old Joe Clarks (1999)
- Ride by Jeff Greinke (1999)
- The Dina Martina Holiday Album by Dina Martina (1999)
- The Big Slowdown by Larry Barrett (2000)
- For the Moment by Marco deCavalho (2003)
- Come Across the River by Heather Duby (2003)
- Principal of Uncertainty by Mark Quint (2004) album
- Carbon Glacier by Laura Veirs (2004)
- C'mon Miracle by Mirah (2004)
- Take Fountain by Wedding Present (2005). She also appeared on their 2006 DVD Search for Paradise.
- For Better or Worse by Paul Manousos (2006)
- Sailor System by Your Heart Breaks (2007)
- Chicken or Beef? by Reptet (2008)
- Entanglements by Parenthetical Girls (2008)
- Villainaire by The Dead Science (2008)
- Trombone Cake, EP by Trombone Cake (2008)
- Wall to Wall by The Golden Bears (2008)
- FLEUVE by Ô Paon (2008)
- Long Live the Days by Mia Katherine Boyle (MKB) (2009)
- (a)spera by Mirah (2009)
- Live and Loud, DVD by Nirvana (2013)
- Consolation E.P. by Protomartyr (2018)
- Keep This Be the Way by Helms Alee (2022)
- Participant by Sheridan Riley (2022)
- Eternalise by Grimm Grimm (2026)

== Equipment ==
Goldston plays a cello made in Seattle in 2013 by Jason Starkie, modeled after Giovanno Grantino. Prior to 2013 she played an instrument made in the 1950s in the shop of Anton Schroetter.

Electrified, she uses a Schertler pickup through a variety of amplifiers, most often a Softscience modeled after Marshall Plexi, a 1970s Fender Deluxe Reverb modified by Kevin Hilbiber of Softscience, a Sunn Beta Lead, or a Soldano Astroverb. Pedals usually include a vintage Pro Co RAT and/or MXR Bass Octave Deluxe, often with various combinations of MXR Phase 90, Boss TR2, Boss RV-6, Cry Baby, and/or Eau Claire Thunder, among others. Goldston also uses one of the first twenty manufactured Juggernautics Fuzz Fixx pedals.

== Awards ==
Goldston has received awards and grants from 4Culture, Meet The Composer, Artist Trust, Jack Straw, and Seattle Arts Commission, King County Arts Commission, Allied Arts (as a member of the Run/Remain Ensemble), and was a 2010 City Artist for Seattle. Goldston was also the recipient of a Stranger Genius Award in 2012. Most recently, Goldston's work with Steve Fisk and Alexander Miranda was nominated for Best Score for Manzanar, Diverted: When Water Becomes Dust at the 2021 IDA Documentary Awards.
