= Cold Cold Water =

EP by Mirah
- Released: March 19, 2002
- Recorded: June–Sep 2001
- Genre: Indie rock
- Length: 19:26
- Label: K Records
- Producer: Mirah, Phil Elvrum, Calvin Johnson, Marno Hay

Mirah chronology
Small Sale EP (2001)	Cold Cold Water (2002)	Songs from the Black Mountain Music Project (2003)

Cold Cold Water EP is an EP by artist Mirah, released on March 19, 2002, on K Records. It includes the studio version of "Cold Cold Water" with acoustic renditions of songs from her Advisory Committee album.

The song "Cold Cold Water" was remixed by the French artists Electrosexual & Abberline for Mirah's Joyride: Remixes album, in 2006.

== Reception ==
Professional ratings
Review scores
Source	Rating
AllMusic	3/5 stars
Pitchfork	8.2/10

It received a positive review in Pitchfork, who praised the title track, stating "the song is deadly serious, dark, and full of the kind of not-so vague sexual innuendos we've come to expect from Mirah. Then, Phil Elvrum's panoramic, Morricone-esque production technique explodes onto the soundstage with swelling strings, huge crashing cymbals, mammoth tympani, and strikingly effective hoof-clopping sounds." It called the other three tracks "admirable bedroom folk."

== Track listing ==
No.	Title	Length
1.	"Cold Cold Water (Album Version)"	5:10
2.	"Apples In The Tree"	1:52
3.	"Make It Hot"	2:27
4.	"Cold Cold Water (Acoustic)"	4:46
5.	"Excerpts..."	0:34
6.	"Untitled"	0:18
7.	"Untitled"	1:03
8.	"Untitled"	0:46
9.	"Untitled"	0:56
10.	"Untitled"	0:23
11.	"Untitled"	0:23
12.	"Untitled"	0:45

== Personnel ==
- Mirah - primary artist
- Phil Elvrum - production
- Calvin Johnson - recording
