= Black Cat Orchestra =

- Origin: Seattle, Washington, U.S.
- Genres: Classical; world music; film score
- Years active: 1991–2004
- Label: Irene
- Past members: Lori Goldston; Kyle Hanson; Don Crevie; Scott Granlund; Emily Marsh; Russ Meltzer; Jeff Teitelbaum; Jessika Kenney; John Helle Otto; Jason Munger; Gina Sala; Detonator Beth; Matthew Sperry; Joseph Zajonc; Jack Magai; Friese Undine
- Website: http://www.theblackcatorchestra.com/index.html

Black Cat Orchestra was an American musical group formed in Seattle, Washington, active from 1991 to 2004. It consisted, in various forms over the years, of Lori Goldston (cello), Kyle Hanson (accordion), Don Crevie (horn), Scott Granlund (saxophone), Russ Meltzer (guitar), Jason Munger and Jeff Teitelbaum (bass), Matthew Sperry (double bass), Detonator Beth, Gina Sala and Jessika Kenney (vocals), Emily Marsh and Joseph Zajonc (drums), Jack Magai (percussion), and Friese Undine (harmonica). The band released two albums, as well as a collaboration with Mirah, To All We Stretch the Open Arm, and appeared on the David Byrne album Feelings.

== History ==
Three members of the band, Kyle Hanson, Lori Goldston, and Don Crevie, had previously played together in a Seattle-area band called The Run/Remain Ensemble. John Helle Otto (baritone sax) was also a member of the original Run/Remain group and continued into the Black Cat configuration. They played their first show together at a wedding in 1989, but would not officially form until 1991. Since then, they have released two albums, a self-released and self-titled debut in 1996 and Mysteries Explained from Irene Records in 2001. In the intervening time, they appeared on David Byrne's 1997 album Feelings, performed for This American Life (a performance that would be featured on the 2006 compilation This American Life: Stories of Hope and Fear), and appeared at numerous film festivals providing live scores for early silent films. In 2003, the Orchestra collaborated with then-Portland-based artist Mirah on a politically themed album called To All We Stretch the Open Arm. The band dissolved in 2004 but Goldston and Hanson's next band, Spectratone International, collaborated with Mirah on the 2007 album Share This Place: Stories and Observations.
