= The Old Days Feeling =

Studio album by Mirah
- Released: July 15, 2008
- Genre: Indie rock, lo-fi
- Length: 31:18
- Label: Modern Radio

Mirah chronology
Share This Place: Stories and Observations (2007)	The Old Days Feeling (2008)	(a)spera (2009)

The Old Days Feeling is a collection of out-of-print, reissued, and unreleased songs by American musician Mirah. Additionally, the album features collaborative work by Phil Elvrum and Calvin Johnson of K Records. Released to a positive reception in 2008, the album received a score of 7/10 by PopMatters.

== Production ==
In the genre of indie rock recorded in a lo-fi style, many tracks are similar in nature to Mirah's debut album, You Think It's Like This But Really It's Like This. Additionally, the album features collaborative work by Phil Elvrum, who had produced Advisory Committee and C'mon Miracle, and Calvin Johnson, who also wrote the liner notes.

It was released on the record label Modern Radio on July 15, 2008.

== Reception ==
Professional ratings
Review scores
Source	Rating
Pitchfork	(7.5/10)
Tiny Mix Tapes	3.5/5 stars
PopMatters	(7/10)

The album met a largely positive reception. Pitchfork gave it 7.5/10, Tiny Mix Tapes gave it 3.5/5, and PopMatters gave it 7/10.

== Track listing ==
1. "Location Temporary" - 1:17
2. "Slighted" - 2:09
3. "Don't Go" - 2:17
4. "Dreamboat" - 1:34
5. "Lone Star" - 2:24
6. "Take Me Out Riding" - 1:22
7. "Heat Gets Hotter" - 1:55
8. "Birthday Present" - 1:35
9. "The Place" - 2:16
10. "Get It?" - 1:38
11. "Land Ho!" - 2:53
12. "The Sun" - 3:01
13. "Don't!" - 2:54
14. "Lonesome Sundown" - 3:32
