= This World Made Itself; Myth and Infrastructure; Dreaming of Lucid Living =

- Directed by: Miwa Matreyek
- Music by: Flying Lotus; Eric Lindley; Anna Oxygen
- Release date: January 19, 2014 (Sundance)
- Running time: 60 minutes
- Country: United States
- Language: English

This World Made Itself; Myth and Infrastructure; Dreaming of Lucid Living is a 2014 animated film by artist Miwa Matreyek. Matreyek combined three of her multimedia solo live performance pieces, mixed them with recorded music and projected animation including her body and different shapes like traversing ocean scapes, cityscapes, and dreamscapes. The film had its premiere at the 2014 Sundance Film Festival on January 19, 2014.

The film later shown at Baltimore Theatre Project from March 16 to March 18, 2014.

== Production ==
Talking about the film, Matreyek said that "From early on, I was interested in breaking down the languages of theater, performance and cinema, and I liked playing with the structure of video." She further added that "When you combine the body with video and music, it can create a feeling that defies the physics and gravity of the real world; the body becomes a bit more ephemeral and the animation can then become more tangible and have a weight to it."

=== Setting ===
Matreyek projected her own body doing domestic chores at home and with animation and projection transports to different scapes of universe.
