= This Is an Exercise =

Studio album by Anna Oxygen
- Released: February 21, 2006
- Genre: Electropop
- Length: 32:23
- Label: Kill Rock Stars (KRS 432)

Anna Oxygen chronology
All Your Faded Things (2003)	This Is an Exercise (2006)

This Is an Exercise is an album by experimental electropop artist Anna Oxygen, released in 2006 on Kill Rock Stars. Allmusic described the album as "just as fascinating as it is chilly and alienating. In her songs, Oxygen explores some of the same issues of authenticity, creation, and consumption that Tracy + the Plastics do, but with a sci-fi/fantasy bent."

== Production and release ==
Oxygen composed the album herself, also handling piano, primary vocals, and sequencing. It also featured Melissa Collins on cello, Andy Gertz on accordion, and guest vocalists Kitty Jenson, Mirah Yom Tov Zeitlyn & Ginger Takahashi. Portland artist Jona Bechtolt helped Oxygen with the cover art. It was released on February 21, 2006 on Kill Rock Stars.

== Critical reception ==
Professional ratings
Review scores
Source	Rating
Allmusic	3.5/5 stars
Phoenix New Times	(positive)

The album met with a mixed reception, with a number of reviewers writing about the album with acclaim. In a positive review for the Phoenix New Times, Ray Cummings called the album "dancey." About Oxygen's vocals, Cummings wrote that "Huff's voice recalls Linda Perry's... at its lightest, it's diva-in-training delightful. In either mode, her pipes are a perfect contrast to the rhythmically ebullient programmed synths and beats supporting them - backdrops coursing, playful, robotic, and pop basic."

In a positive review for Allmusic, Heather Phares called the album "a darker, more dramatic, and more polished affair than All Your Faded Things," also describing it as "just as fascinating as it is chilly and alienating. In her songs, Oxygen explores some of the same issues of authenticity, creation, and consumption that Tracy + the Plastics do, but with a sci-fi/fantasy bent." Phares gave the album 3.5/5 stars, also stating that "on This Is an Exercise, Anna Oxygen excels at creating a unique, sometimes disturbing sonic world with an almost-palpable sense of atmosphere."

== Track listing ==
1. "Fairy Quest" – 2:59
2. "Fake Pajamas" – 2:41
3. "Dream. Dream. Dreams." – 2:26
4. "March of Human" – 1:40
5. "Hypertension" – 3:25
6. "R.R.N." – 2:23
7. "Mechanical Fish" – 2:51
8. "Walk" – 2:53
9. "Psychic Rainbow" – 2:13
10. "Willow Song" – 4:08
11. "This Is..." – 2:27
12. "Hold You" – 2:17

== Personnel ==
- Anna Oxygen - Composer, Cover Art, Layout Design, Piano, Primary Artist, Sequencing
- Melissa Collins - Cello
- Andy Gertz - Accordion
- Kitty Jenson - Vocals
- Mirah Yom Tov Zeitlyn & Ginger Takahashi - vocals
- Jona Bechtolt - Cover Art, Layout Design
