= (a)spera =

Studio album by Mirah
- Released: March 10, 2009
- Genres: Indie rock; indie pop; chamber pop
- Label: K

Mirah chronology
The Old Days Feeling (2008)	(a)spera (2009)	Thao + Mirah (2011)

(a)spera is the fourth studio album by American singer-songwriter Mirah, released on March 10, 2009. Produced by Phil Elverum, it met with a largely positive reception from music critics.

== Production and release ==
(a)spera was the first album after a four-year hiatus by Mirah, after time spent working on collaborations and remixes of previous albums. Phil Elverum produced and engineered the album, as with many of her previous releases. It was released on March 10, 2009, on Olympia label K Records.

== Critical reception ==
Professional ratings
Aggregate scores
Source	Rating
Metacritic	82/100
Review scores
Source	Rating
AllMusic	4/5 stars
Alternative Press	4/5 stars
American Songwriter	4/5 stars
Drowned in Sound	8/10
Paste	8.3/10
Pitchfork	7.8/10
PopMatters	8/10
Spin	3.5/5 stars
Under the Radar	8/10

The album received positive reviews, including 4/5 stars from Allmusic, a positive review in Dusted Magazine, 7.8/10 by Pitchfork Media, 8/10 by PopMatters, and 3.5/5 stars from Spin.

According to PopMatters, "The musical marriage of Mirah and Elvrum is one of those rare perfect meeting of the minds—Jay-Z and Kanye, Butch Vig and Kurt Cobain, Phil Spector and... basically anyone who can sing. One could easily imagine Mirah being just another songwriter, singing turgid ballads about loneliness over an acoustic guitar (and indeed there is the occasional disturbing flash of this in her work), but through the intelligent production of Elvrum, and indeed, some of the other producers on (a)spera, she is able to set her thoughts upon soaring mountains of musical genius."

== Track listing ==
All tracks are written by Mirah, except where noted.

No.	Title	Length
1.	"Generosity"	3:43
2.	"The World Is Falling"	5:00
3.	"Education"	5:18
4.	"Shells" (Kane Mathis, Mirah)	2:31
5.	"Country of the Future"	3:34
6.	"The Forest"	3:29
7.	"Gone Are the Days"	3:40
8.	"The River"	7:49
9.	"Bones & Skin"	3:11
10.	"While We Have the Sun" (originally recorded in 2003; new version)	4:40

== Personnel ==
Songwriting, etc.

- Mirah – Vocals, Songwriting, etc.
- Christopher Doulgeris – Bass, Guitar, Piano, Vocals, Producer, Organ (Pump), Horn Arrangements, String Arrangements

Production

- Phil Elverum – Producer, Engineer, Guitar, Piano, Cymbals, Organ (Hammond),
- Bryce Panic – Producer, Percussion, Bongos, Drums, Vocals, Kalimba, Bells, Claves, Vibraphone, Hi Hat
- Tucker Martine – Producer, Engineer, Mixing
- Kane Mathis – Producer, Kora
- Adam Selzer – Producer, Engineer, Mixing
- Barry Corliss – Mastering
- Liz Haley – Photography, Cover Collage

Instrumentals

- Jef Brown – Sax (Baritone), Sax (Tenor)
- Chris Funk – Dobro, Mandolin, Celeste, Hurdygurdy, Dulcimer (Hammer)
- Lori Goldston – Cello
- Cory Gray – Trumpet
- Radio Sloan – Guitar
- Doug Jenkins – Cello
- Robert Andrew Jones – Double Bass
- Emily Kingan – Caixa
- Justin Mackovich – Violin
- Lisa Molinaro – Viola
- Cynthia Nelson – Flute
- Tara Jane O'Neil – Bass, Guitar, Guitar (Bass)
- Toussaint Perrault – Trombone, Trumpet, Tuba
- Mehmet "Memo" Vurkaç – Caixa, Pandeiro, Repique, Surdo
