= Anna Oxygen =

American singer-songwriter

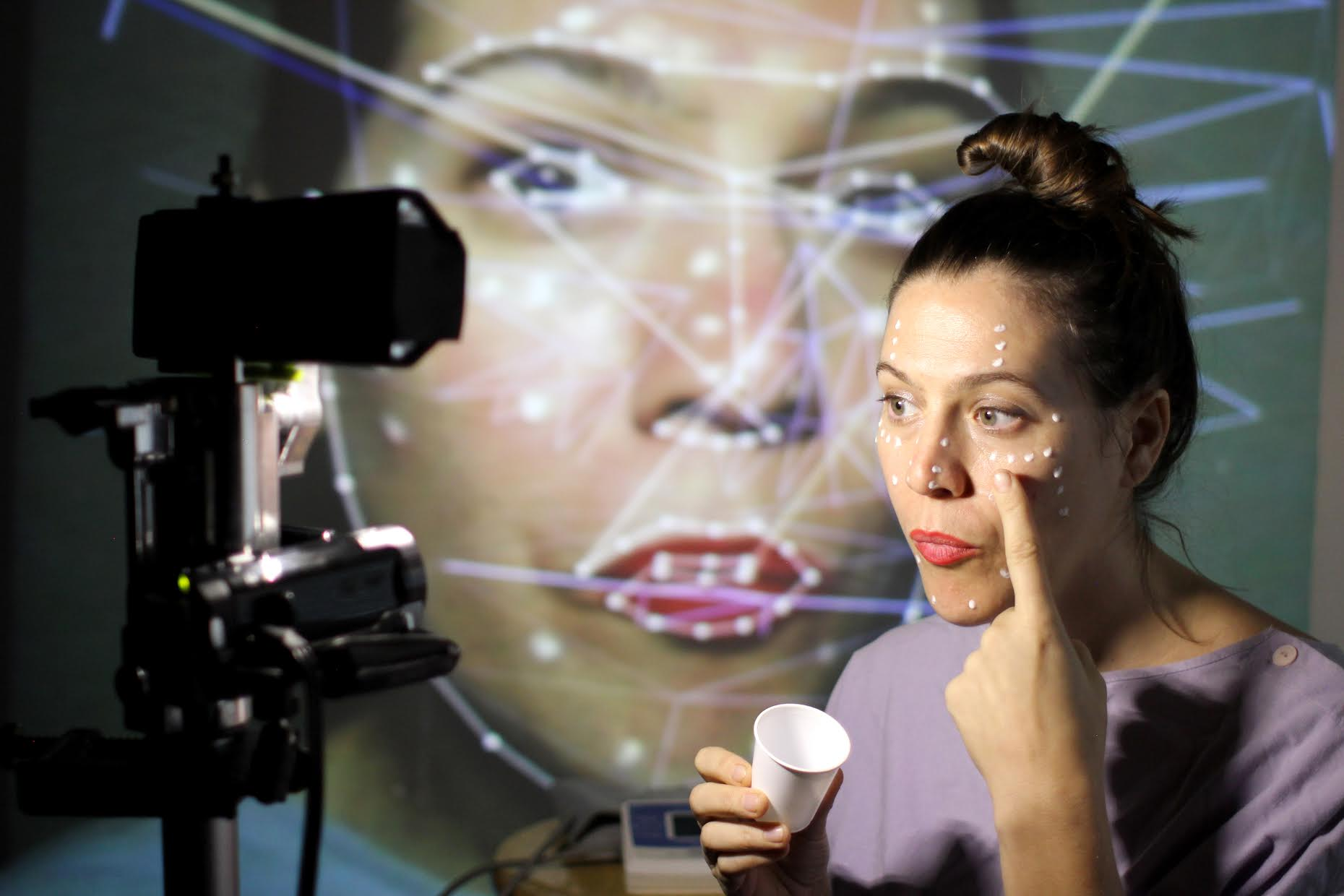
- Oxygen in 2014

Background information
- Born: Anna Jordan Huff
- Origin: Olympia, Washington
- Genres: Electropop, psychedelic folk
- Occupations: Actress, vocalist, musician, songwriter
- Instruments: Piano, vocals
- Years active: Late 1990s–present
- Labels: Kill Rock Stars, Cold Crush, K
- Member of: The Space Ballerinas, Cloud Eye Control
- Website: www.annaoxygen.com

Anna Jordan Huff is an American multi-media artist, composer, producer and actress best known by her stage name Anna Oxygen. After starting her music career as a member of the Space Ballerinas, a synth-pop group then based in Olympia, she recorded her debut solo album All Your Faded Things (2003) with producer Justin Trosper, before releasing her second album This Is an Exercise (2006) on the Kill Rock Stars label. Her albums have featured guest vocalists such as Beth Ditto and Mirah.

Huff has appeared as a guest artist on recordings by groups such as the Microphones. Huff is also a member of Cloud Eye Control, a performance art group, and is a member of the psychedelic folk group Day/Moon. Her feature film debut as an actress was the 2005 film Police Beat, and she has written for a number of film soundtracks, including the three films This World Made Itself, Myth and Infrastructure, and Dreaming of Lucid Living, animated by Miwa Matreyek, and numerous short films by animator Maureen Selwood.

Since 2020, Huff has taught at Hamilton College. She had previously taught at the Cornell University College of Architecture, Art, and Planning and California Institute of the Arts' Center for Integrated Media.

== Performance career ==
=== Space Ballerinas (1990s–2001) ===
Huff began her musical career in the late 1990s with the novelty synth-pop group the Space Ballerinas, based in Olympia. She handled vocals and keyboards, as well as helping write their original material. Making their debut as a trio at Ladyfest Olympia, the group released two EPs on Yoyo Records entitled "Diamonds" and "If Goth Was Pink" and opened a show for Peaches before disbanding in 2001. Also around this time she contributed to albums by local artists such as the Blow, Phil Elverum, Mirah, and Karl Blau.

=== Solo material, acting (2002–2007) ===
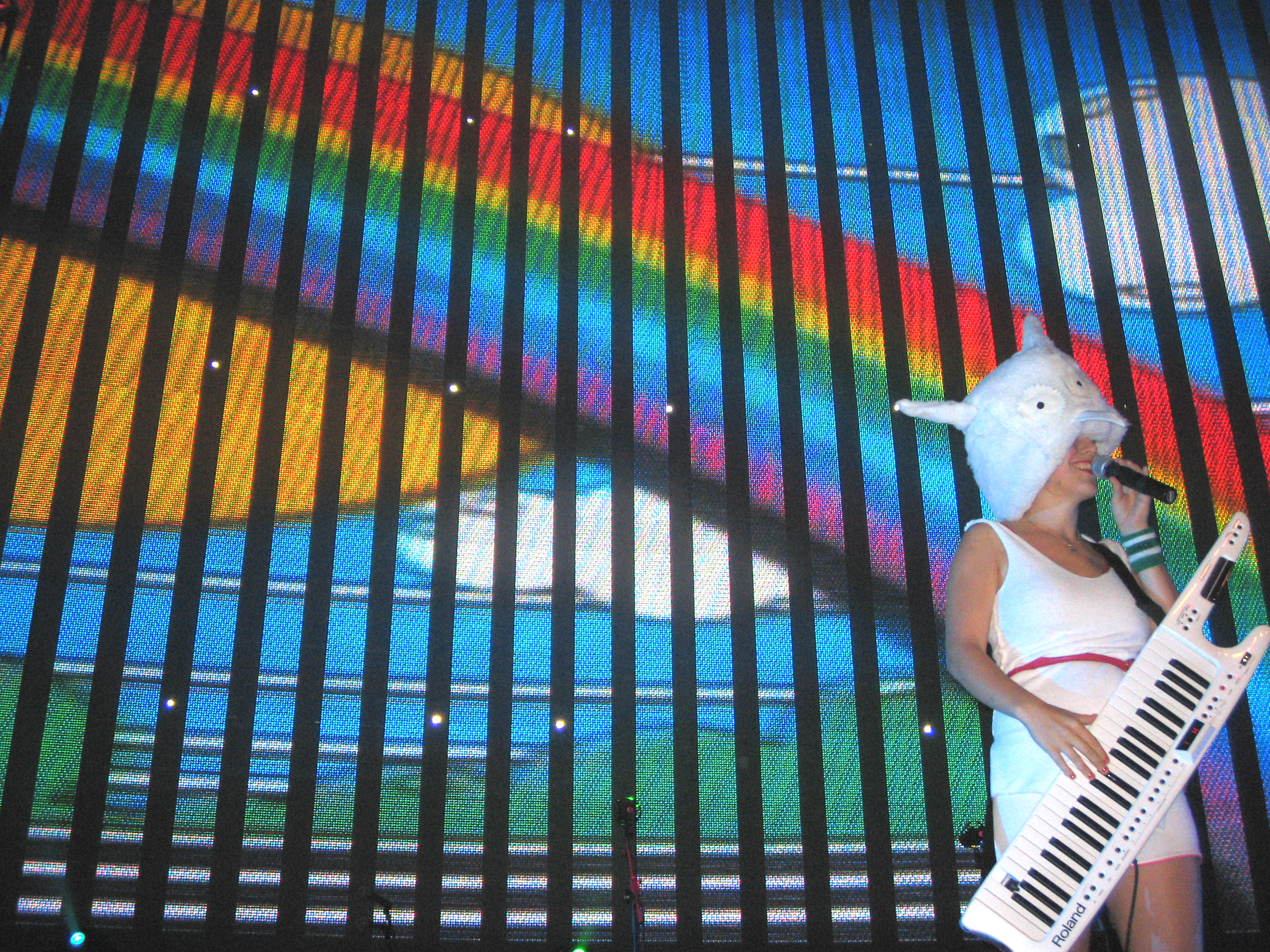
Anna Oxygen at Bumbershoot in 2005, while touring in support of her debut solo album All Your Faded Things.

Huff's solo career started in 2002 after she moved from Olympia to Seattle. She then recorded All Your Faded Things with producer Justin Trosper, which was released on Cold Crush Records (an affiliate of Dim Mak Records founded by Derek Fudesco of Murder City Devils and Steve Aoki) in 2003. MacKenzie Wilson of AllMusic termed the album synth-pop and commented on the "minimalist approach" of the production, stating "she adds a bit of sauce to the new-millennium electroclash stage and celebrates the delicious design of classic new wave."

Huff's feature film debut as an actress was in the 2005 film Police Beat, an American crime film written by Charles Mudede of The Stranger.

"This Is an Exercise [is] just as fascinating as it is chilly and alienating. In her songs, Oxygen explores some of the same issues of authenticity, creation, and consumption that Tracy + the Plastics do, but with a sci-fi/fantasy bent."

— AllMusic

After releasing the single "45 Meet Jennifer", Huff released her second album This Is an Exercise on the Kill Rock Stars label on February 21, 2006. As Anna Oxygen, she composed the album herself, handling primary vocals and sequencing. It featured guest artists such as Kitty Jensen and Mirah Yom Tov Zeitlyn as vocalists. Portland artist Jona Bechtolt helped Huff with the cover art. With mostly original music, the album also includes a cover of "Willow's Song" by American composer Paul Giovanni The album was met with a largely positive reception. The Phoenix New Times wrote that Huff's vocal stylings were "a perfect contrast to the rhythmically ebullient programmed synths and beats supporting them—backdrops coursing, playful, robotic, and pop basic." In 2007, as Anna Oxygen, she contributed the song "Born to Shake" to the Play compilation released by DeSoto Records.

=== Cloud Eye Control (2007–present) ===
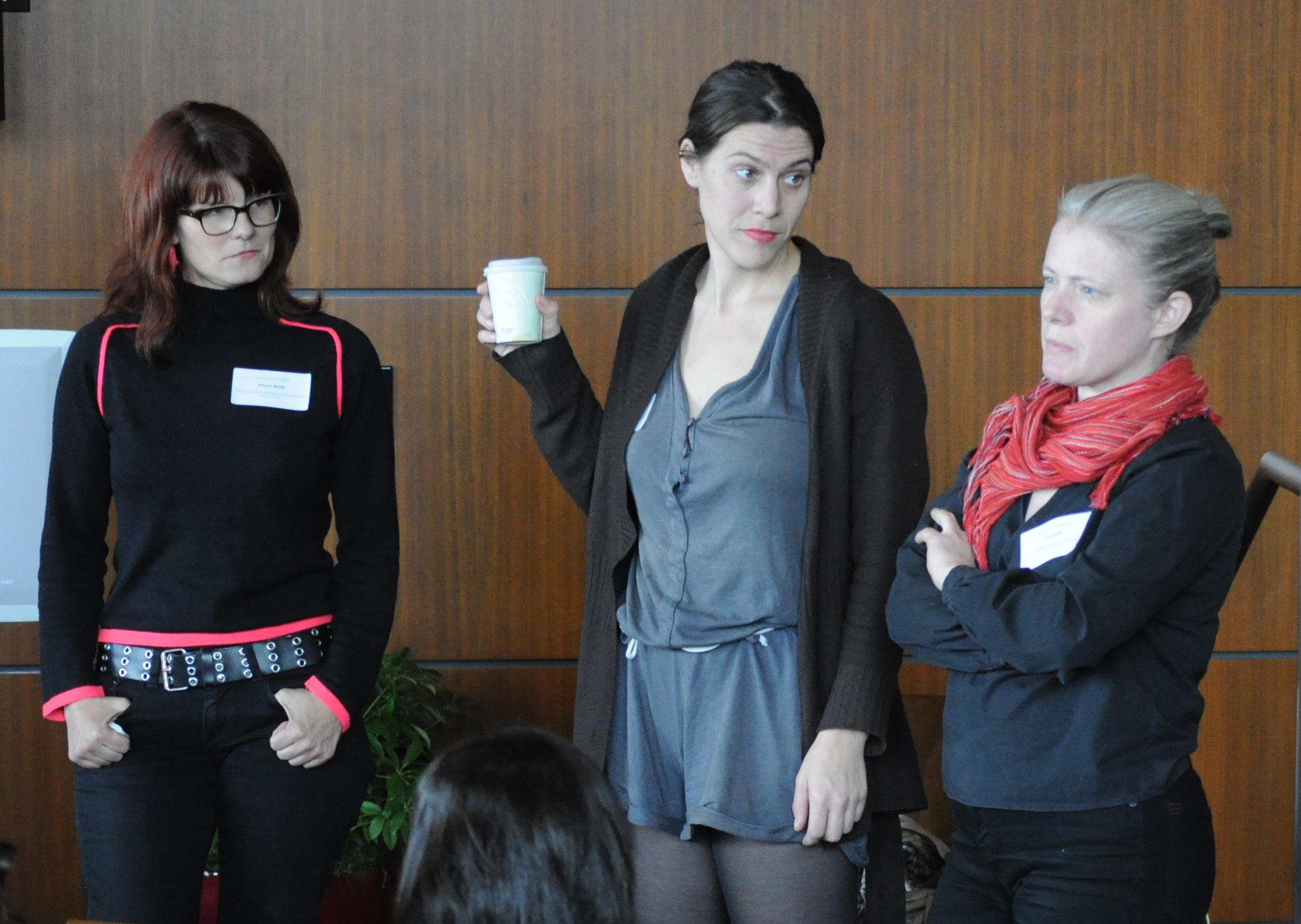
Allison Wolfe, Anna Oxygen (center) and Jen Smith at a 2011 conference

While attending CalArts in Los Angeles, California as a graduate student in 2007, Huff formed Cloud Eye Control with fellow students Miwa Matreyek and Chi-wang Yang. Cloud-Eye Control is an experimental theater group, with Huff handling composition, co-creation and serving as a primary performer. In 2009 the group completed and performed the multimedia performance art piece entitled Under Polaris, first performed in Portland, Oregon and hosted by the Portland Institute of Contemporary Art (PICA). Under Polaris sold out a five-day run at REDCAT in Los Angeles, and was featured at the 2009 National Performers Network conference in Knoxville, Tennessee. In 2010 the show traveled to the Exit Festival in Paris, and the Fusebox Festival in Austin, Texas. The Los Angeles Times called the show "retro-futuristic" and "a transcendently spectacular piece of theater."

Huff, Flying Lotus, and Eric Lindley contributed music to various animated performances by Miwa Matreyek, including This World Made Itself, Myth and Infrastructure, and Dreaming of Lucid Living. Myth and Infrastructure premiered at the Global TED Conference in Oxford and all three films went on to various international venues including the 2014 Sundance Film Festival. Huff's own live performances have been exhibited in museums such as PS1 MOMA Contemporary, The Seattle Art Museum, Hammer Museum, PICA, and the Rohsska Museet in Gothenburg, Sweden.

=== Collaborations (2014–present) ===
Huff has collaborated with Tamala Poljak, of the Los Angeles group Longstocking recording a psyche folk LP (still unreleased) under the name Day//moon, The group has also collaborated with Tara Jane O'Neil. Huff has worked with other artists such as Eric Lindley, Becky Stark, David Scott Stone and many others in the Los Angeles scene, and was a member of the Los Angeles Ladies Choir. She has collaborated with Jack Black's wife Tanya Haden on art, music and puppet shows, and can be seen alongside Black and Kyle Gass of Tenacious D, promoting their Festival Supreme in a series of shorts directed by Liam Lynch.

== Discography ==
=== With Space Ballerinas ===
- 2001: Diamonds EP CDr/12" (YoYo Records)
- 2001: If Goth Were Pink EP CD (YoYo Records)

=== Solo material ===
==== Albums ====
Albums by Anna Oxygen, with hidden track listings
Year	Title	Release details
2003	All Your Faded Things: 1. "Baby Blue" – 2:49; 2. "Red Horse Cafe" – 2:56; 3. "Psychedelic Dance Party" – 1:49; 4. "Aviva" – 2:01; 5. "Scientist" – 2:22; 6. "Mine All Mine" – 1:32; 7. "Loose to the Tight" – 2:15; 8. "Spectacle" – 2:50; 9. "Nerve Angels Two" – 2:15; 10. "Primary Colors" – 1:32; 11. "Painted Yellow Crown" – 2:19; 12. "Man on the Screen" – 2:10; 13. "Nerve Angels Three" – 1:49; 14. "Ponytails" – 3:17	Released: July 22, 2003; Label: Cold Crush Records/Dimmak; Format: Digital, CD
2006	This Is an Exercise: 1. "Fairy Quest" – 2:59; 2. "Fake Pajamas" – 2:41; 3. "Dream. Dream. Dreams." – 2:26; 4. "March of Human" – 1:40; 5. "Hypertension" – 3:25; 6. "R.R.N." – 2:23; 7. "Mechanical Fish" – 2:51; 8. "Walk" – 2:53; 9. "Psychic Rainbow" – 2:13; 10. "Willow Song" – 4:08; 11. "This Is..." – 2:27; 12. "Hold You" – 2:17	Released: February 21, 2006; Label: Kill Rock Stars; Format: Digital, CD

=== Guest appearances ===
Incomplete list of production credits for Anna Huff
Year	Title	Artist(s)	Role
1999	Anthem	Nomy Lamm	Composer, keyboards, vocals (as Huff)
2001	Clothes Your I's	Karl Blau	Vocals (as Huff)
2001	Blood	The Microphones	Choir
2003	Mount Eerie	The Microphones	Composer, spoken word, voices
2003	The Concussive Caress	The Blow	Beats, keyboards, Sangbe drum (as Huff)
2004	Poor Aim: Love Songs	The Blow	Composer
2004	Mountain Rock	Dear Nora	Performer
2006	Joyride: Remixes	Various	Primary artist
2008	The Old Days Feeling	Mirah	Choir/chorus (as Huff)
2014	Where Shine New Lights	Tara Jane O'Neil	Voices (as Huff)

== See also ==
- Music of Olympia
- List of California Institute of the Arts people
