= To All We Stretch the Open Arm =

Studio album by Mirah
- Released: 2004
- Recorded: Seattle, Washington, January 2003
- Genre: Indie rock
- Length: 38:09
- Label: Yoyo Records
- Producer: Pat Maley, Ed Varga

Mirah chronology
Songs from the Black Mountain Music Project (2003)	To All We Stretch the Open Arm (2004)	C'mon Miracle (2004)

To All We Stretch the Open Arm is a collection of political songs by a variety of songwriters, performed by Mirah and the Black Cat Orchestra. It met with a positive review in AllMusic and mixed review from Pitchfork.

== Production ==
The album was produced by Pat Maley and Ed Varga, and recorded in early 2003 in Seattle, Washington. Mirah and the orchestra cover songs by artists such as Fausto Amodei, Bob Dylan, Leonard Cohen, Kurt Weill, Bertholt Brecht, Horacio Guarany, and Stephen Foster, and also cover several original songs by Mirah as well. It was released on Yoyo Records in 2004.

== Reception ==
Professional ratings
Review scores
Source	Rating
AllMusic	3/5 stars
Pitchfork	5.2/10

It met with a positive review in AllMusic and mixed review from Pitchfork. According to AllMusic, "While the album certainly addresses war and oppression with an appropriately somber tone (especially on Cohen's "Story of Isaac" and the sweetly earnest reading of Foster's "Hard Times"), To All We Stretch the Open Arm doesn't lose sight of how important passion and wit are to any good protest."

== Track listing ==
1. "Per I Morti [di] Reggio Emilia" (Fausto Amodei) – 2:30 (Instrumental)
2. "Monument" (Mirah) – 3:40
3. "Dear Landlord" (Bob Dylan) – 3:25
4. "Story of Isaac" (Leonard Cohen) – 4:09
5. "The Light"(Mirah) – 4:10
6. "What Keeps Mankind Alive?"(Kurt Weill/Bertholt Brecht) – 3:15
7. "How Sweetly Friendship Binds" (Kurt Weill/Paul Green) – 1:47
8. "Si Me Quieres Escribir" (Anonymous)– 2:48
9. "Si Se Calla el Cantor" (Horacio Guarany) – 3:16
10. "Hard Times (Come Again No More)" (Stephen Foster) – 4:02
11. "El Cant Dels Ocells" (Anonymous) – 2:58
12. "Bella Ciao" (Anonymous) – 2:01

== Personnel ==
- Mirah - primary artist
- Black Cat Orchestra - instrumentals
- Ed Varga - producer
- Pat Maley - producer
