= All Your Faded Things =

Studio album by Anna Oxygen
- Released: July 22, 2003
- Genre: Electropop, synthpop
- Length: 31:56
- Label: Cold Crush Records (CC005)
- Producer: Justin Trosper

Anna Oxygen chronology
| All Your Faded Things (2003) | This Is an Exercise (2006) |

Professional ratings
Review scores
| Source | Rating |
|---|---|
| Allmusic | 3/5 stars |

All Your Faded Things is an album released by Anna Oxygen on July 22, 2003 under the Cold Crush Records label. It was produced by Justin Trosper.

== Critical reception ==
Wrote MacKenzie Wilson of Allmusic in a review for the album, Oxygen is "enjoyably cheeky in delivering her own dance-pop formula." Calling the album synthpop, the review also praised the "minimalist approach" of the production, which led to a "fluid, full sound well-suited for both dance and indie rock fans." Also, "she adds a bit of sauce to the new-millennium electroclash stage and celebrates the delicious design of classic new wave."

== Track listing ==
1. "Baby Blue" – 2:49
2. "Red Horse Cafe" – 2:56
3. "Psychedelic Dance Party" – 1:49
4. "Aviva" – 2:01
5. "Scientist" – 2:22
6. "Mine All Mine" – 1:32
7. "Loose to the Tight" – 2:15
8. "Spectacle" – 2:50
9. "Nerve Angels Two" – 2:15
10. "Primary Colors" – 1:32
11. "Painted Yellow Crown" – 2:19
12. "Man on the Screen" – 2:10
13. "Nerve Angels Three" – 1:49
14. "Ponytails" – 3:17

== Personnel ==
- Anna Oxygen - primary artist
- Justin Trosper - engineer and production
