= Mirah =

American musician

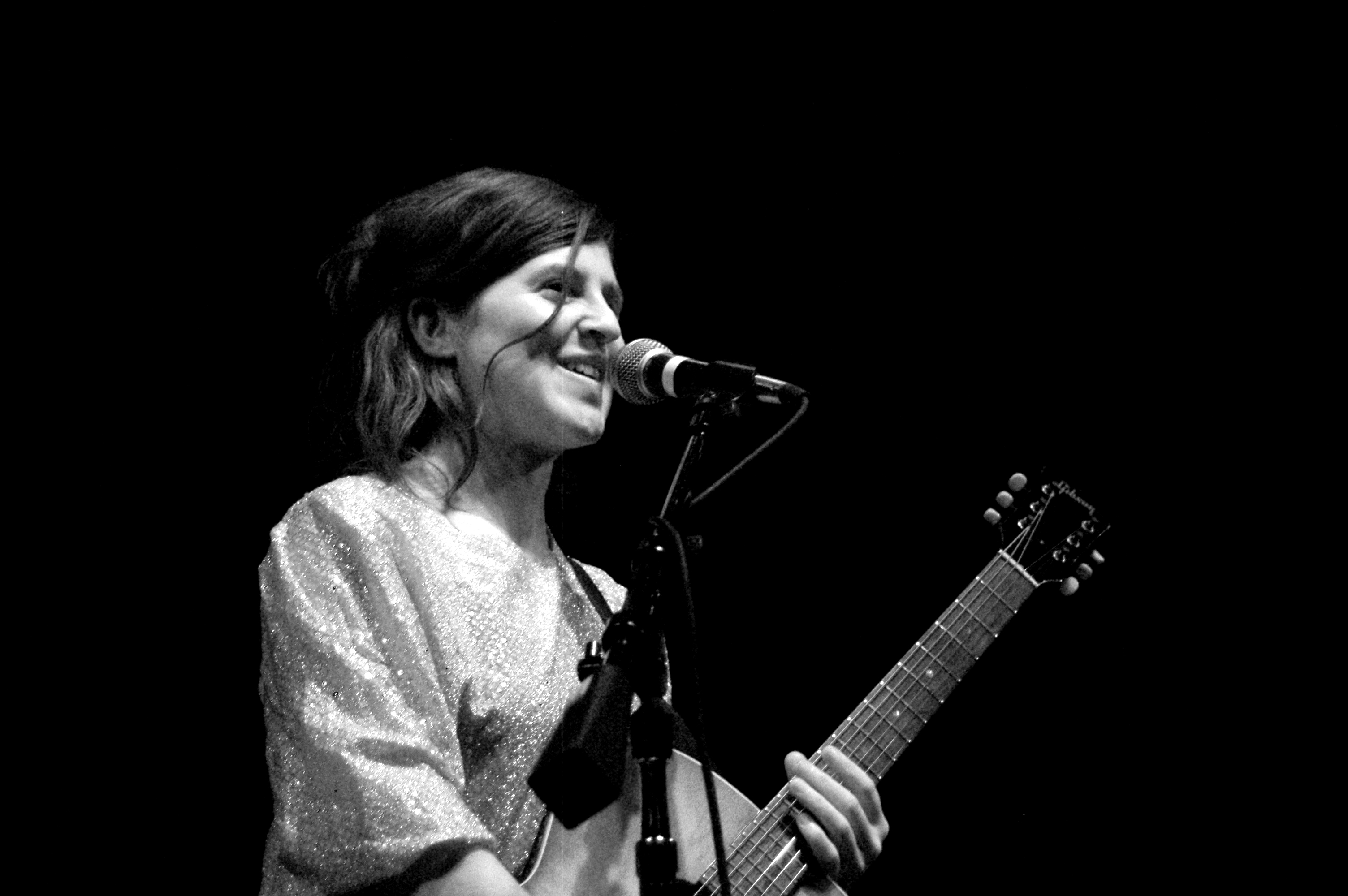
- Mirah performing in January 2008

Background information
- Born: Mirah Yom Tov Zeitlyn; September 17, 1974 (age 52); Philadelphia, Pennsylvania, U.S.
- Genres: Indie rock, chamber pop, indie pop
- Occupation: Singer-songwriter
- Instruments: Vocals, guitar
- Years active: 1997–present
- Labels: Double Double Whammy, Absolute Magnitude Recordings, K Records, Kill Rock Stars, Yoyo Recordings, Modern Radio Record Label, Morning Light Records
- Formerly of: Phil Elvrum of The Microphones/Mt. Eerie, The Black Cat Orchestra, Thao Nguyen, The Blow, Calvin Johnson, Ginger Brooks Takahashi, Spectratone International (Lori Goldston and Kyle Hanson), Tara Jane O'Neil, Jherek Bischoff, Susie Ibarra
- Website: mirahmusic.com

Mirah (born Mirah Yom Tov Zeitlyn) (born September 17, 1974) is an American musician and songwriter based in Brooklyn, New York. After getting her start in the music scene of Olympia, Washington, in the late 1990s, she released a number of well-received solo albums on K Records, including You Think It's Like This but Really It's Like This (2000) and Advisory Committee (2002). Her 2009 album (a)spera peaked on the Billboard Top Heatseekers chart at No. 46, while her 2011 collaborative album Thao + Mirah peaked at No. 7.

She has released eleven full-length solo and collaborative recordings, numerous EP's and 7" vinyl records, and has contributed tracks to a wide variety of compilations. Mirah has collaborated with artists such as Phil Elverum of The Microphones, Tune-Yards, Susie Ibarra, Jherek Bischoff and Thao Nguyen.

Her style encompasses indie pop, acoustic, and experimental pop. According to The Rumpus in 2011, "Mirah's early records...are DIY mini-masterpieces that express a punk sensibility through broken drum machines, reverb-drenched guitars and ukulele. Her more recent albums...are mature, complex and immaculately-produced."

On July 31, 2020, Mirah released a 20 Year Anniversary Reissue of her germinal album, You Think It's Like This But Really It's Like This via Double Double Whammy. The double LP reissue includes a remastered version of the record as well as a tribute to the album that features covers by Mount Eerie, Half Waif, Hand Habits, Palehound, Shamir, Sad13 (Sadie Dupuis), Allison Crutchfield (of Swearin') and more. The Fader premiered the reissue record and wrote, "the LP established Mirah as one of the smartest and most exciting young artists in America. It also went on to inspire a new generation of indie musicians, drawn in by Mirah’s deft and introspective songwriting..."

== Early life, education ==
Mirah Yom Tov Zeitlyn was born on September 17, 1974, in Philadelphia, Pennsylvania, the youngest of three children. Her mother is a painter and massage therapist and together with her father ran a small natural foods bakery throughout Mirah's childhood and adolescence. Her father worked delivering Rolling Stone magazine for several years in the late 1970s. Her parents raised the family on macrobiotic foods. Her father was an avid music lover with a large record collection and Mirah developed an early interest in music. As a child, she listened heavily to Motown, 1960s R&B, soul music, and folk music.

Mirah's family moved a number of times between 1974 and 1979, including a stint on a hippie commune near Spencer, West Virginia and several years in a rural Pennsylvania farmhouse adjacent to the farm owned by her extended family. The family moved to Bala Cynwyd, a suburb of Philadelphia, in 1979. Her mother's family identifies as Protestant and her father is Jewish. Mirah was raised observing Shabbat and identifies as Jewish.

Mirah took part in a number of anti-nuclear walks during her middle school and high school years, including a 6-week stretch of the 9-month cross country Great Peace March for Global Nuclear Disarmament in 1986 when she was 12. In middle school she developed a love of 1980s pop music and female artists such as Sinéad O'Connor and Cyndi Lauper. By the time she got to college, her music collection had expanded to include a diverse range of artists (Huggy Bear, Cat Stevens, The Pretenders, Nina Simone, etc.).

== Music career ==
=== Start in Olympia (1990s) ===
After graduating high school early at 16, Mirah spent a year traveling before moving to Olympia, Washington, in 1992 to attend the Evergreen State College. She taught herself guitar and wrote her first song as an assignment for class. While in college she worked at a collectively run vegetarian campus café with Kimya Dawson, who later became her label-mate at K Records.

She was a member of the short-lived all-female Olympia band The Drivers with Molly Burgdorf and Sarah Reed. For a short stint she sang with a swing band and occasionally contributed vocals to an early incarnation of Old Time Relijun. She was briefly the drummer for The Chosen, a Jewish heavy metal duo. In 1996 she began developing her own musical style, composing lo-fi indie pop with vocals and acoustic guitar. Her early style drew comparisons to Liz Phair, and she soon began performing around Olympia under the one-name moniker Mirah.

Mirah was involved with a number of "secret cafes" in Olympia, including The Red Horse Cafe which she and her roommate Ariana Jacob ran out of their one bedroom apartment. The Red Horse Cafe served a different menu every Sunday for a year and a half in 1998/1999. The Red Horse Cafe appears in the documentary short 9 Weeks. She was also involved with several large scale theatrical productions including The Transfused, a 2000 rock opera written by Nomy Lamm and The Need.

Though surrounded by the local riot grrrl movement of the 1990s, Mirah didn't explicitly associate herself with the genre.

After graduating from the Evergreen State College in 1996, she began experimenting on her 4-track recorder with sounds that would be used on her debut album. Her first EP Storageland was released on Yoyo Recordings in 1997 and received a positive review in Allmusic. The 6 song one sided 12" featured an etching on the B side by artist Nikki McClure. According to Laura Leebove in Venus Zine, listeners were "drawn to the unpolished sound...with its sometimes muffled vocals, raw guitars, and background-noise cracklings." In 1999 she self-released a second EP titled Parts of Human Desire. The bulk of her first records were recorded at the Dub Narcotic studio space in Olympia Washington.

Olympia musician Phil Elverum soon invited her to contribute guitar and vocals to his psychedelic pop group The Microphones, and she performs on many Microphones recordings including Don't Wake Me Up (1999) and Window (2000). She later toured extensively with The Microphones across the US and Canada. According to The Rumpus, Mirah "was part of the K Records renaissance [of the late '90s] along with bands like The Microphones, The Blow and Old Time Relijun – all highly distinct, idiosyncratic groups with Calvin Johnson's influence perhaps manifesting in the form of a primitivist or intentionally naïve approach."

=== Early albums (2000–2005) ===
You Think It's Like This but Really It's Like This (2000)

Mirah joined the Olympia-based label K Records in 1999. Her full-length debut and first album on the label, You Think It's Like This but Really It's Like This, was released on June 6, 2000. Produced by Mirah and Phil Elverum, it scored 4/5 stars from AllMusic, who called it "a masterpiece of lo-fi beauty" and praised "Mirah's wistful voice and intimately personal lyrics."

Small Sale EP (2001)

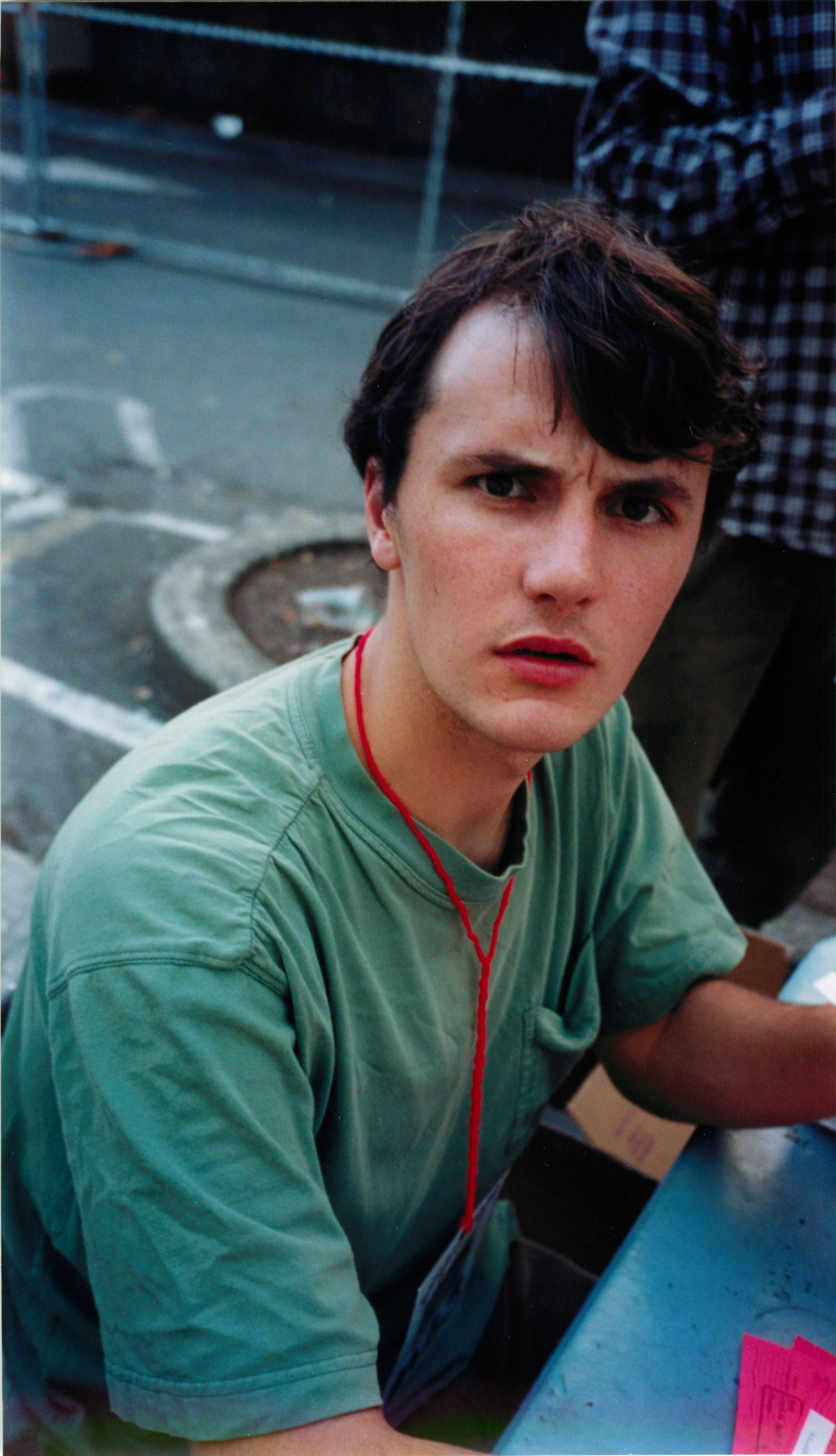
Phil Elverum produced or co-produced many of Mirah's early recordings.

Small Sale EP is a 2001 album by Mirah released on Modern Radio Records. Songs were recorded from 1999 to 2001 at Mirah's house and the recording studio Dub Narcotic, all while Mirah was still touring for her previous album. It was positively received by Allmusic, who compared Mirah's vocals to Lucinda Williams and called her voice "intoxicatingly endearing, as are the electronic beats and textures she uses as deftly as she does a ukulele or acoustic guitar."

Advisory Committee (2002)

Mirah's second full-length album was recorded over a one-year period, starting on September 17, 2000, and ending on July 4, 2001, and was produced by both Mirah and Phil Elverum. Advisory Committee was released on K Records on March 19, 2002, and was well-received, earning an AllMusic score of 4.5/5 and a Pitchfork score of 8.3/10, who praised the maturity of her voice and lyrics.

Cold Cold Water EP (2002)

Mirah's Cold Cold Water EP was released on March 19, 2002, on K Records. It received a positive review in Pitchfork, who praised the title track, stating "the song is deadly serious, dark, and full of the kind of not-so vague sexual innuendos we've come to expect from Mirah. Then, Phil Elverum's panoramic, Morricone-esque production technique explodes onto the soundstage." Pitchfork called the other three tracks "admirable bedroom folk."

Songs from the Black Mountain Music Project (2003)

Songs from the Black Mountain Music Project is a collaboration between Mirah and Ginger Brooks Takahashi. It was written by Mirah and Takahashi in a secluded house in the Blue Ridge Mountains in 2002, and recorded using a Tascam four-track and a mini-disc recorder. According to Allmusic, "the chirping birds, lonesome train whistles, and buzzing insects that pop up throughout [the album] make it feel like a collection of audio postcards from Takahashi and Mirah's vacation." K Records released the album on August 19, 2003.

After living in Washington state for about ten years, Mirah moved to Portland, Oregon around early 2004.

To All We Stretch the Open Arm (2004)

Performed by Mirah and the Black Cat Orchestra, To All We Stretch the Open Arm is a collection of political songs by a variety of songwriters. Songs include covers of artists such as Fausto Amodei, Bob Dylan, Leonard Cohen, Kurt Weill, Bertholt Brecht, Horacio Guarany, and Stephen Foster, and several original songs by Mirah as well. Recorded in Seattle in early 2003, it was released on Yoyo Records in 2004 to a positive review in Allmusic and a mixed review from Pitchfork. According to Allmusic, "While the album certainly addresses war and oppression with an appropriately somber tone, To All We Stretch the Open Arm doesn't lose sight of how important passion and wit are to any good protest."

C'mon Miracle (2004)

C'mon Miracle is Mirah's third full-length solo album. Several of the songs on C'mon Miracle reflect her experience visiting South America, specifically Buenos Aires, Argentina. The two songs recorded in Buenos Aires were co-produced with Mirah's long-time collaborator Bryce Kasson, also known as Bryce Panic. The rest of the tracks were co-produced with Phil Elvrum. The album was released on K Records on May 4, 2004, to a positive reception, earning "Best New Music" and a 8.5/10 rating from Pitchfork.

She released a music video for the C'mon Miracle single "Don't Die in Me," which was created by Tara Jane O'Neil and Kristina Davies and features animated drawings and paintings by O'Neil.

=== Collaborations (2006–2008) ===
Joyride: Remixes, 2006

Joyride: Remixes is a double CD containing remixes of Mirah's material by K Records artists, such as Guy Sigsworth, Anna Oxygen, Tender Forever, Yacht, Mount Eerie, Khaela Maricich, Lucky Dragons and Electrosexual. Released by K Records on November 21, 2006, the album was positively received, scoring 3.5/5 from Allmusic and 3/5 from Tiny Mix Tapes.

Mirah's music is featured in the 2006 documentary, Young, Jewish, and Left. Around 2006 she began working with Portland-based musician Tara Jane O'Neil, with O'Neil joining Mirah's live band and co-headlining a tour to Europe. Mirah played at the Sasquatch Festival in the summer of 2007.

Share This Place: Stories and Observations

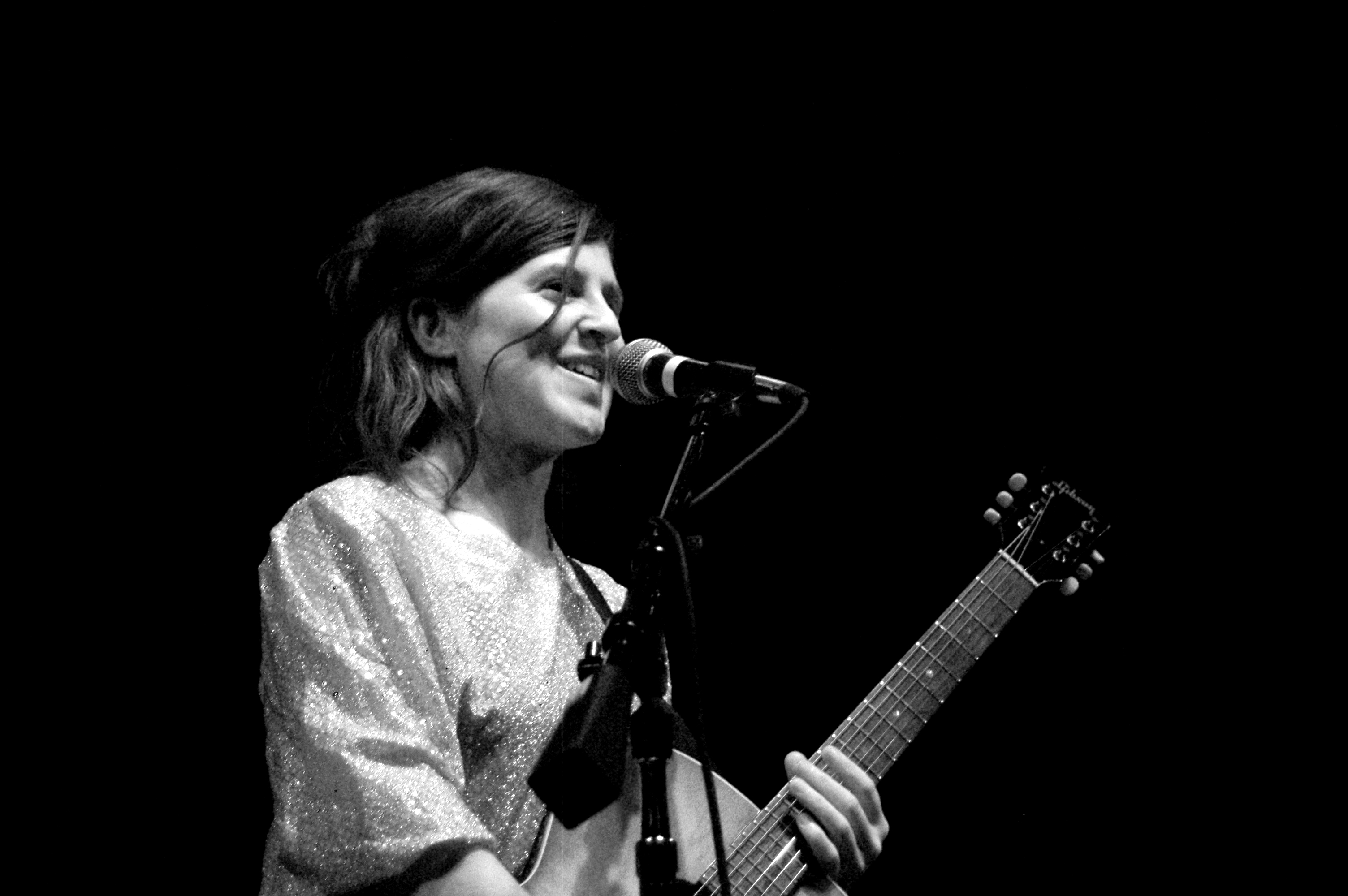
Mirah at the Rio Theatre, Santa Cruz, Jan. 2008

Released on K Records on August 7, 2007, Share This Place: Stories and Observations is a collaborative album between Mirah and Spectratone International (Lori Goldston and Kyle Hanson, formerly of the Black Cat Orchestra). The subject matter revolves around the lives of insects, and the album was inspired by the writing of 19th century entomologist and poet J. Henri Fabre, as well as The Insect Play by Karel Čapek. Stop motion films by Britta Johnson were also a part of the project. According to Allmusic, "[the songs] are intricate and beautifully made, giving a larger scale to the big events in these tiny lives – birth, death, mating, eating, sacrifice, survival – while keeping the details that make them fascinating." As of September 2008 she was touring and performing with Spectratone International, playing a string of gigs on the west coast.

In 2008, she had an essay published in the book Rock 'n' Roll Camp for Girls.

The Old Days Feeling, singles

The Old Days Feeling is a collection of out-of-print, reissued, and unreleased songs by Mirah, featuring collaborative work by Phil Elvrum and Calvin Johnson of K Records. In the genre of indie rock and recorded in a lo-fi style, it was released on Modern Radio Records on July 15, 2008, to a positive reception. Pitchfork gave it a score of 7.5/10, while Tiny Mix Tapes gave it 3.5/5.

In July 2008 her song "The Garden" was featured in the TV show So You Think You Can Dance. The song, which had been previously released on her 2002 album Advisory Committee, also charted at No. 45 on the US Top Heatseekers song chart, reaching No. 31 on the same chart in Canada.

=== Live performances, touring ===
Between 1998 and 2009 she toured extensively, mostly in the US and Canada with smaller stints in Europe and Japan, all within a network of underground and DIY spaces and promoters. These shows would happen at house parties, all-ages spaces and small clubs. She performed at Ladyfest in Seattle, Philadelphia, London, and Amsterdam, as well as at several Yoyo A Go Go festivals. In 2009 she started working with the Billions booking agency.

=== Recent releases (2009–present) ===
(a)spera, touring (2009)

(a)spera, the title of Mirah's fourth full-length studio album, released on March 10, 2009, is a play on the Latin words for hope and difficulty. It was her first solo album after a four-year hiatus spent working on collaborations and remixes of previous albums. As with many of her previous releases it was co-produced by Phil Elverum and released on K Records. She also worked with Grammy-nominated producer Tucker Martine on 4 of the tracks.

The album peaked on the Billboard Top Heatseekers chart at No. 46, and received largely positive reviews. PopMatters praised Elverum's production, stating, "The musical marriage of Mirah and Elverum is one of those rare perfect meeting of the minds—Jay-Z and Kanye, Butch Vig and Kurt Cobain...through the intelligent production of Elvrum...she is able to set her thoughts upon soaring mountains of musical genius."

As of May 2009 she had toured both the US and Europe in support of the album, and she moved to San Francisco in November of that year. Her 2010 music video for "The Forest" (from (a)spera) was directed by Lauryn Siegel and has choreography by Faye Driscoll and photographed by Ava Berkofsky.

Thao + Mirah (2010)

In early 2010, after performing with singer-songwriter Thao Nguyen at the Noise Pop Festival in San Francisco, the two announced a 2010 North American tour, billed under the name Thao and Mirah with the Most of All. They performed a collaborative set and shared vocal duties on each artist's respective songs. They subsequently recorded a full-length album of original material called Thao + Mirah. Produced by musician Merrill Garbus of the band Tune-Yards, the album was released by Kill Rock Stars on April 26, 2011. It was well received by music critics; according to Pitchfork, "everything on Thao & Mirah feels of a cohesive collaborative piece, separate from either artist's solo work, a combination that synthesizes their individual strengths to outstanding effect."

The two toured in support of the album while working with Air Traffic Control, an organization that provides artists a platform for social activism.

2010–present

She released a solo EP Don't/The Tears That Fall EP in 2010 as a vinyl single on Mississippi Records. Also in 2010 her track "Engine Heart" off You Think It's Like This but Really It's Like This was used in the soundtrack for the romantic comedy Love & Other Drugs. In October 2011 her song "Special Death" was featured in the TV show American Horror Story.

Her 2011 release of the digital single "Low Self Control" was produced by Christopher Doulgeris and the accompanying video was by Doulgeris and Aubree Bernier-Clarke.

She began living part-time in Brooklyn in October 2012, moving there full-time in the fall of 2013.

Mirah co-wrote a song called "The Nest" which appeared on Jherek Bischoff's 2012 album Composed, and she has performed that song and others with various ensembles in Seattle and New York City, including The Wordless Music Orchestra and Contemporaneous. Mirah and Bischoff first performed "The Nest" (and several of Mirah's songs which Bischoff arranged for orchestra) live at the 2012 Ecstatic Music Festival in NYC with notable vocalists including David Byrne, and again at St. Ann's Warehouse in Brooklyn in 2014.

As part of the "Portland's Indies" series, she had a 2013 performance with the Oregon Symphony. She also wrote a piece collaboratively with percussionist and composer Susie Ibarra, which they debuted at the 2014 Ecstatic Music Festival (NYC). The opera piece is titled "We Float," and according to the Kaufman Music Center, is about "exploring the substance and ethereality of spacewalks, sound and the human experience."

Changing Light (2014)

Changing Light, was released on May 13, 2014. Changing Light features guest appearances by Mary Timony, Deerhoof's Greg Saunier, Jherek Bischoff, Emily Wells and Heather McEntire. Bischoff wrote the string arrangements for many of the tracks. Changing Light was released on Mirah's imprint, Absolute Magnitude Recordings, in collaboration with K Records.

Glide Magazine gave it 9/10 stars, stating the album "covers a lot of earthly ground, from animals to nature and seasons...Light deals with being in transition on deep levels, confronting mortality in fascinating ways." The review described her vocals as "gauzy, but never thin, and this time around she sounds a bit world-wearier. But it works for her, adding a smoky sultriness, and subtle imperfections that make each song rawer because of it."

Sundial EP (2017)

Mirah’s Sundial EP was released on October 6, 2017, through her imprint label, Absolute Magnitude Recordings. The EP was created in collaboration with Jherek Bischoff and features reworked versions of six songs from Mirah’s back catalogue, along with the title track “Sundial.”

The release has been described as featuring orchestral arrangements and reflective themes, with the title track incorporating string instrumentation and lyrical imagery centered on cosmic observation and human experience.

Understanding (2018)

On September 7, 2018, Mirah released her 2nd full-length album on her imprint label Absolute Magnitude Recordings, "Understanding". The 10-track record stems from demos recorded during Mirah's time in residency at the Headlands Center for the Arts in Northern California. Mirah returned to New York and fleshed out the rest of the album with frequent collaborators Greg Saunier (of Deerhoof) and Eli Crews (Tune Yards, Julie Ruin). Mirah released four singles to accompany the album - "Hot Hot", "Information", "Lighthouse", and "Ordinary Day". She also released a music video for "Lake/Ocean", which follows Mirah on her journey through the Alaskan Inside Passage, confronting her fear of water and darkness. The album's first track, Counting, is featured on the TV show Veronica Mars.

All Music calls it "a commanding and confident collection of songs that blends the confessional with the celebratory. Much more shimmering and robust than earlier lo-fi albums...Understanding doesn't shy away from layered vocals, synthesizer flourishes, and big crescendos." NPR included Understanding on its list of 'Eight Albums You Should Hear Now" on its release day.

You Think It's Like This But Really It's Like This: 20 Year Anniversary Reissue (2020)

On July 31, 2020, Mirah released a deluxe reissue version of her seminal LP, You Think It's Like This But Really It's Like This, via Double Double Whammy. The original record was remastered by Josh Bonati and the double LP includes a full tribute album featuring more than twenty contributing artists. Many of the artists have been longtime collaborators of Mirah's, such as Mount Eerie and The Blow, and many newer artists inspired by Mirah's catalog, including Half Waif, Shamir, Palehound, Mal Blum and more.

Dedication (2026)

Mirah released her seventh studio album, Dedication, on February 20, 2026, through Double Double Whammy and her imprint Absolute Magnitude Recordings.The album consists of ten songs and was recorded at Altamira Sound in Los Angeles. It marked her first full-length release in eight years, following Understanding (2018).

The album includes singles such as “The Ballad of the Bride of Frankenstein,” “After the Rain,” and “Catch My Breath.”Critics described Dedication as a reflective work addressing themes of motherhood, grief, and personal change.

== Style, equipment ==
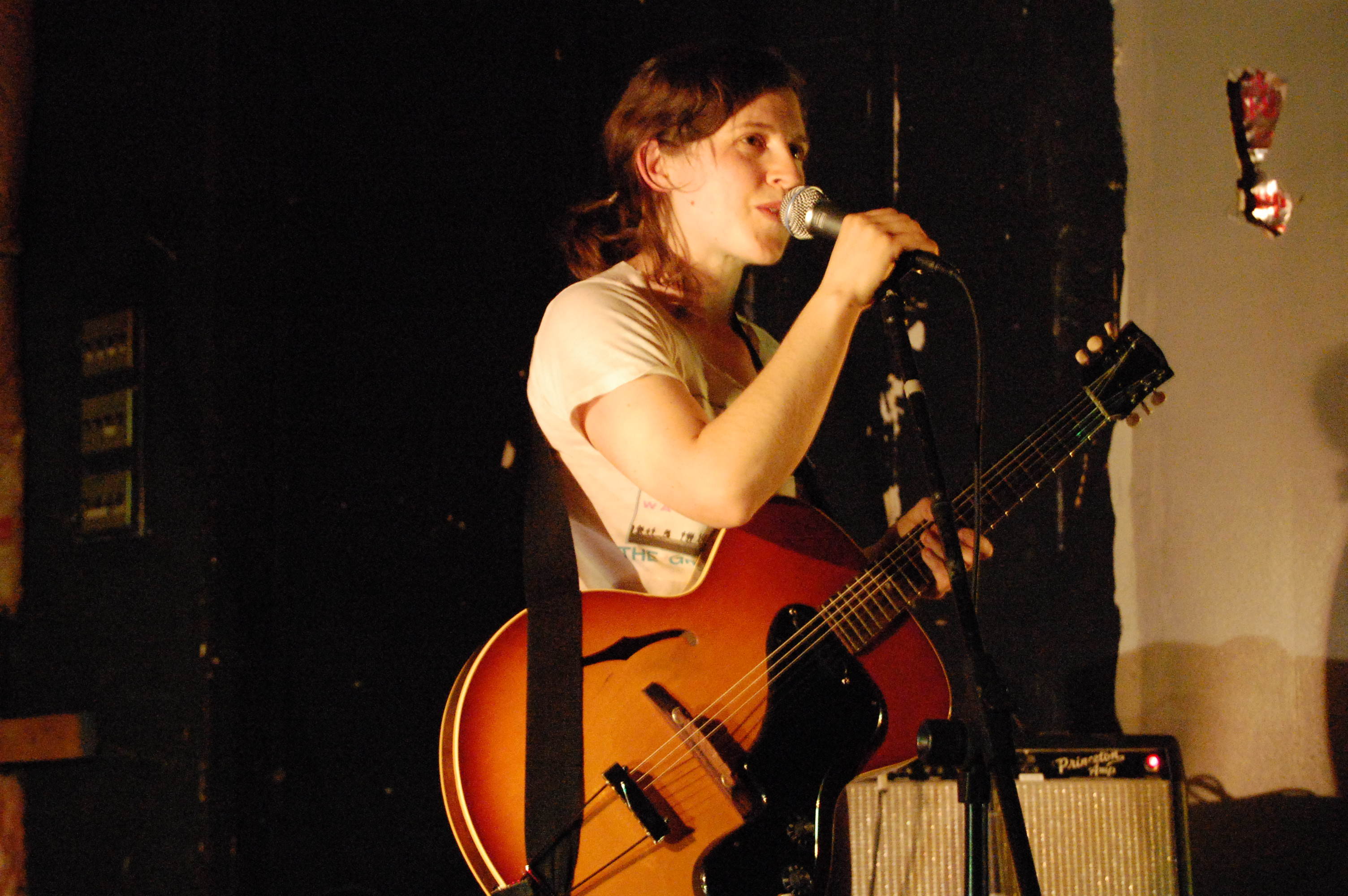
Mirah with her Gibson guitar in 2009

As a vocalist, songwriter, and experimental pop recording artist, Mirah typically works independently while songwriting, though frequently collaborates as a recording artist. In 2007, she began writing collaboratively for the first time with Spectratone International.

According to The Rumpus in 2011, "Mirah's early records...are DIY mini-masterpieces that express a punk sensibility through broken drum machines, reverb-drenched guitars and ukulele, singing with frank sexuality in an occasionally child-like voice. Her more recent albums...are mature, complex and immaculately-produced."

She primarily plays guitar and also has guest musicians accompany her live and on records. According to Mirah in 2008, "I play the same guitar as I did when I first started out. I only own two guitars, my Gibson and a little acoustic...So for me, the simpler the better onstage. Just me and my guitar, and sometimes just me and my voice, my favorite instrument."

Mirah's live band has included friends and artists such as Bryce Kasson, Tara Jane O'Neil, Rachel Blumberg, Melanie Valera, Alex Guy, Andrew Maguire, Lisa Schonberg, Lori Goldston, Emily Kingan (Lovers), Christopher Doulgeris, Maia MacDonald and many others.

== Personal life ==
As of 2014 Mirah is based in Brooklyn, New York. Her older sister is Emily Ana Zeitlyn of The Weeds and Divers. Her partner is film-maker Todd Chandler. On September 5, 2018, she announced that she and her partner were pregnant with their first child. Mirah has been out as queer throughout her professional career.

Mirah identifies as Jewish. She has stated that her "most Jewish" song is "Jerusalem", originally written for a Hanukkah compilation album. The song criticizes Israel's treatment of Palestinians. In addition to the song "Jerusalem", she has criticized Israel in interviews and social media. She has stated: "the violence that’s perpetrated against Palestinians—the whole situation is just like, how could we do that?"

== Publishing history ==
- 2008: Rock 'n' Roll Camp for Girls – essay included

== Filmography ==
- 2005: Burn to Shine DVD

== Discography ==
=== Solo material ===
==== Studio albums ====
List of studio and live solo albums by Mirah
Year	Album title	Chart peaks	Release details
Year	Album title	Heat	Release details
2000	You Think It's Like This but Really It's Like This	—	Released: June 6, 2000; Label: K; Format: CD
2002	Advisory Committee	—	Released: March 19, 2002; Label: K; Format: CD, digital
2004	C'mon Miracle	—	Released: May 4, 2004; Label: K / 7 e.p. (Japan only); Format: CD, digital
2009	(a)spera	46	Released: March 10, 2009; Label: K / 7 e.p. (Japan only); Format: CD, digital, vinyl
2014	Changing Light	—	Released: May 13, 2014; Label: Absolute Magnitude/K; Format: CD, digital
2018	Understanding	—	Released: September 7, 2018; Label: Absolute Magnitude/K; Format: LP, CD, digital
2020	You Think It's Like This But Really It's Like This: 20 Year Anniversary Reissue	—	Released: July 31, 2020; Label: Double Double Whammy; Format: LP, CD, digital
2026	Dedication	—	Released: February 20, 2026; Label: Double Double Whammy; Format: LP, CD, digital
"—" denotes a recording that did not chart or was not released in that territory.

==== EPs ====
List of extended plays by Mirah
Year	Album title	Release details
1998	Storageland	Released: April 24, 2001; Label: Yoyo USA; Format: 12" vinyl single
1999	Parts of Human Desire EP	Released: 1999; Label: self-released; Format: cassette
2001	Small Sale EP	Released: 2001; Label: Modern Radio Records; Format: 7" vinyl
2002	Cold Cold Water EP	Released: March 19, 2002; Label: K; Format: CD
2010	Don't/The Tears That Fall EP	Released: 2010; Label: Mississippi Records; Format: vinyl single
2017	Sundial EP	Released: October 6, 2017; Label: Absolute Magnitude Recordings; Format: 12" vinyl, clear

==== Singles ====
Incomplete list of notable singles by Mirah
Year	Song	Album	Chart peaks		Notes
Year	Song	Album	US	Can	Notes
	"Promise to Me"		—	—	Used in Ringer (CW)
2002	"Special Death"	Advisory Committee	—	—	Featured in American Horror Story, Oct. 2011, and promo
2002	"The Garden"	Advisory Committee	—	—	Used in CSI (CBS)
2006	"The Garden" (live)	College Park Is Always Ready to Party	45	13	Used for routine in So You Think You Can Dance
2006	"The Fruits of Your Garden"	Joyride: Remixes	64	31	
2006	"La Familia"	Joyride: Remixes	—	—	Used in episode of Grey's Anatomy and a Kinder chocolate ad in France
2010	"Gone Are the Days"	EP with 4 versions	—	—	Used in Private Practice (ABC)
2010	"Low Self Control"	Digital single	—	—	Also with music video
2011	"Hallelujah"	Thao + Mirah	—	—	Used in MTV's Teen Wolf
2011	"Teeth"	Thao + Mirah	—	—	Used in Parenthood (NBC)
2012	"The Nest" (with Jherek Bischoff)	Composed	—	—	
"—" denotes a recording that did not chart or was not released in that territory.

=== Collaborations ===
List of collaborative albums with Mirah
Year	Album title	Chart peaks		Release details
Year	Album title	Heat	—	Release details
2003	Songs from the Black Mountain Music Project (with Ginger Brooks Takahashi & Friends)	–	–	Released: August 19, 2003; Label: K Records; Format: CD, digital
2004	To All We Stretch the Open Arm (with Black Cat Orchestra)	–	–	Released: March 16, 2004; Label: Yoyo Records; Format: CD, digital
2007	Share This Place: Stories and Observations (with Spectratone International)	–	–	Released: August 7, 2007; Label: K / 7 e.p. (Japan); Format: CD, LP
2011	Thao + Mirah (with Thao Nguyen)	7	–	Released: April 26, 2011; Label: Kill Rock Stars; Format: CD, digital
"—" denotes a recording that did not chart or was not released in that territory.

=== Collections and other releases ===
List of remix or compilation albums related to Mirah
Year	Album title	Release details
2003	College Park Is Always Ready To Party (lo-fi concert recording by Mirah)	Released: 2003 / February 16, 2006; Label: Morning Light Records; Format: Vinyl, digital
2006	Joyride: Remixes (by various)	Released: November 21, 2006; Label: K Records; Format: Double CD, digital
2008	The Old Days Feeling (reissues by Mirah)	Released: July 15, 2008; Label: Modern Radio Records; Format: CD, digital
2010	Gone Are All The Days – Remixes EP (remix album by Mirah)	Released: August 24, 2010; Label: K; Format: Digital

=== Scores, orchestral pieces ===
- 2014: We Float (opera co-written with Susie Ibarra)

=== Compilations, soundtracks ===
Compilations

- 1994: TESC Student Compilation – track "Carve in It" by The Mirah Yom Tov Zeitlyn Band
- 1996/7: TESC Student Compilation – track "Lucky Little Shark" by Mirah Yom Tov Zeitlyn
- 1997: Overboard (comp by Yoyo Records) – track "Letter" by The Drivers
- 1997: Go Olympia by Nikki McClure (cass comp.) – track "Tumwater Falls"
- 1997: Chez Vous (K Records, produced by Jen Smith) – track "Lucky Little Shark"
- 1997: Shmompilation (cass comp.) – tracks "I'm My Own Best Friend" and "Aftermath"
- 1999: Projector (studio compilation) – track "Precious Little Rocket"
- 1999: Hootenholler (LoveTapeLove in Santa Cruz, cass comp.) – track "Get It?" as well as "Who Among the Mighty Can Compare to You?" by The Chosen
- 1999: Olympia Talent Show (CD comp.) – cover of Yoko Ono's "Yes I'm Your Angel"
- 1999: YoYo a GoGo 1999 (CD comp, Yoyo Records) – track "Engine Heart"
- 1999: Lullaby Lullaby (Eighty North Records) – track "Special Death"
- 2000: Secret Home Party 7" (Little Pad Records, Japan) – track "Location Temporary"
- 2001: Breakout (Dead Turtle Recordings, cass comp.) – track "I'm Alive"
- 2002: One year later...It Still Hurts/Queers Against the G8 (Speed Demon Queer Zine) – track "Monument"
- 2004: Hidden Songs, a Green UFOs 10th Anniversary Compilation – track "Dogs of BA"
- 2005: "The Vibration Split" with Emilyn Brodsky (Third Story Records, 7") – track "Out Riding"
- 2005: Pressing Sounds compilation – track "The Life You Love"
- 2005: PDX Pop Now compilation – track "While We Have the Su"n (4-track home version)
- 2009: This Is a Care Package (benefit comp for H.I.P.S., or Helping Individual Prostitutes Survive) – track "While We Have the Sun"
- 2010: Subterranean Homesick Blues: A Tribute to Bob Dylan's 'Bringing It All Back Home – version of "Love Minus Zero"
- 2016: 30 Days, 30 Songs - track "No Guns No Guns"

Soundtracks

- 2010: Group soundtrack (film w/Carrie Brownstein and Nomy Lamm, Yoyo Recordings) – track "Sweepstakes Prize"

=== Performance credits ===
- 1999: Don't Wake Me Up by The Microphones – vocals, guitar
- 2000: Window by The Microphones – vocals, guitar
- Sick of Recorder by Tokyo – Japanese vocals on track "Cold Cold Winter"
