= Tender Forever =

- Born: Vito Valera; 1977 (age 47–48)
- Origin: Maurrin, France
- Genres: Pop
- Occupation: Musician
- Instruments: Vocals, Guitar, bass guitar, Keyboard, Ukulele, Drums
- Years active: 2003-present
- Labels: K Records
- Website: http://www.tenderforever.com/

Tender Forever is the pop electronica project of Franco-American musician Vito Valera. Valera has released four albums with K Records and now works on multimedia projects where they reside in Olympia, Washington.

== Background ==
Valera was born in Maurrin, France in 1977 to Spanish parents. They moved to the US because they felt that France was "very old fashioned and uptight".

== Music ==
Valera began creating music as a student at the University Michel de Montaigne of Arts in Bordeaux, France. They first served as the lead singer of The Bonnies, a cover band of songs by 1960s girl bands. Later they were involved with a band called Garrison Rocks.

In 2003, they started Tender Forever. Valera said that the name refers to: "Something I am trying to be and maybe it´s part of me, but more like an ideal."

Their debut album, The Soft and the Hardcore, was released in 2005. The album includes both acoustic folk rock and synth-based R&B. It features a song about taking a shower after sex.

Two years later, Tender Forever released Wider, an album about love and heartbreak. Most of the instruments and vocals were performed by Valera. The instruments included: "synthesizers, mostly, but also a wooden spoon, chopsticks, an 'old crappy drumset from 1981', a saucepan, 'some rice', and more."

Their next album, No Snare (2010), was darker compared to their earlier work.

In 2012, Tender Forever raised money to pay for renewing their American work visa. They also released the EP Where Are We From, which was called "a puzzling enigma of a release".

They use many instruments including guitar, bass, keyboard, their computer, wooden utensils, glockenspiel, and maracas. Tender Forever's musical style has been described as unique and "deconstructed rhythm ‘n’ blues filtered through a laptop" that "offers a great deal of sonic adventurousness".

Valera, performing as Tender Forever, has toured in the US and Europe with MEN, Rae Spoon, Mirah, Lovers, and others. Tender Forever's performances have been called high-energy, "playful", and "programmed for enjoyment".

== Multimedia Projects ==
Valera has worked on big scale multimedia projects, including collaborations with film maker Ted Passon, artist Nick Lally, producer Christopher Doulgeris, musician The Blow, and singer songwriter Mirah. Most recently, they performed at the Time-Based Art Festival in Portland, Oregon, the Whitney Museum of American Art in New York City, the Centre Georges Pompidou, La Cité Internationale Universitaire de Paris, and La Gaîté Lyrique in Paris. They received the RAAC (Regional Arts & Culture Council) Grant to complete a collaborative project called MAZED with Peter Burr and was invited to the Henry Art Gallery to lecture on reenactment and public source content. they are currently working and teaching at Evergreen State College in Olympia, Washington.

== Discography ==
=== Albums ===
- The Soft And The Hardcore (2005, K Records)
- Wider (2007, K Records)
- No Snare (2010, K Records)
- Where Are We From (2011, K Records)

=== Compilation appearances ===
- My Love (Justin Timberlake cover) on Reprises Inrocks no. 1 (2007, Les Inrockuptibles)

=== Collaborations ===
- remix of Mirah's song Make It Hot on Joyride: Remixes (2006, K Records)
