= The Caretaker (album) =

Studio album by Half Waif
- Released: March 27, 2020
- Length: 34:01
- Label: Anti-

Half Waif chronology
Lavender (2018)	The Caretaker (2020)

The Caretaker is the fourth studio album by American musician Nandi Rose Plunkett, under her stage name Half Waif. It was released on March 27, 2020, under Anti-.

The first single from the album, "Ordinary Talk" was released on January 28, 2020.

== Critical reception ==
Professional ratings
Aggregate scores
Source	Rating
Metacritic	79/100
Review scores
Source	Rating
AllMusic	3.5/5 stars
Beats Per Minute	90%
Exclaim!	8/10
Loud and Quiet	8/10
Paste	7.3/10
Pitchfork	8/10

The Caretaker was met with generally favorable reviews from critics. At Metacritic, which assigns a weighted average rating out of 100 to reviews from mainstream publications, this release received an average score of 79, based on 9 reviews.

== Track listing ==
The Caretaker track listing
No.	Title	Length
1.	"Clouds Rest"	2:19
2.	"Siren"	3:15
3.	"Ordinary Talk"	3:25
4.	"My Best Self"	3:04
5.	"In August"	3:45
6.	"Lapsing"	2:39
7.	"Halogen 2"	2:18
8.	"Blinking Light"	3:15
9.	"Brace"	3:37
10.	"Generation"	2:50
11.	"Window Place"	3:34
Total length:		34:01
