= You Think It's Like This but Really It's Like This =

Studio album by Mirah
- Released: June 6, 2000
- Genre: Indie rock
- Length: 45:22
- Label: K
- Producer: Mirah, Phil Elvrum

Mirah chronology
Storageland EP (1997)	You Think It's Like This but Really It's Like This (2000)	Advisory Committee (2002)

You Think It's Like This but Really It's Like This is Mirah's debut album, released in 2000 on K Records. In July 2020, Mirah released a 20th anniversary reissue of the album via Double Double Whammy. The double LP reissue includes a remastered version of the record as well as a tribute to the album that features covers by Mount Eerie, Half Waif, Palehound, Shamir, Sad13 (Sadie Dupuis), Allison Crutchfield (of Swearin') and more.

== Production ==
The album followed Mirah's debut release, Storageland EP and was produced by Mirah and Phil Elvrum, with a number of contributing instrumentalists.

Of the reissue record, Phil Elverum of Mount Eerie shares, “It was a joy to record my version of Mirah’s song ‘Of Pressure’ using the old cassette 4 track and all the instruments we used to use together in the old days,” Phil Elverum said in a statement. “Same air organ, same antique drum machine, same chaos. I remember when Mirah first recorded her original. It was part of a batch of songs that she worked on independently of our collaboration in Dub Narcotic studio. Her 4 track world. That one was a big built world of mounting layers, the feeling of pressure and depth. I loved it and I still do. I wanted to see if I could make it a little more oppressive even.”

Nandi Rose of Half Waif shares, "It was a huge honor to record a cover for the legendary Mirah in celebration of this 20th anniversary reissue. I chose “Murphy Bed” because I could immediately hear the chorus being reimagined as a more choral-focused arrangement. There’s also something obviously sensual about this song lyrically, so I wanted to play that up with the slow backbeat and just have some fun with it. I’m really grateful to Mirah for her fearless songwriting, and I loved getting to interpret that with my own arrangement."

== Reception ==
Professional ratings
Review scores
Source	Rating
AllMusic	4/5 stars
Pitchfork	8.0/10

The album was well received, scoring a 4/5 stars from AllMusic, who called it "a masterpiece of lo-fi beauty." They praised the production by Phil Elvrum, and stated the album is "a true indie pop triumph. From beginning to end, You Think It's Like This But Really It's Like This hovers majestically on a cloud of songcrafting genius and, as the title suggests, is constantly in a state of shapeshifting. Tones change from elegant to pensive to heavy but still manage to drift by graciously with the help of Mirah's wistful voice and intimately personal lyrics."

Pitchfork named the album #35 on its list of The 50 Best Indie Rock Albums of The Pacific Northwest, calling it "an album about perception, how one thing can seem like something else, and how sincerity can be subversive."

Tracks from the album have been used in many movies and television shows, including "Engine Heart" which was used for the soundtrack of the film Love & Other Drugs, a 2010 romantic comedy, and "Sweepstakes Prize" which was featured in an episode of NBC's Good Girls in early 2020.

== Track listing ==
1. "Million Miles" – 1:55
2. "Sweepstakes Prize" – 4:49
3. "Of Pressure" – 3:53
4. "This Dance" – 2:26
5. "La Familia" – 2:53
6. "Gone Sugaring" – 1:19
7. "Person Person" – 2:21
8. "Engine Heart" – 2:35
9. "Archipelago" – 4:23
10. "100 Knives" – 3:53
11. "Murphy Bed" – 2:19
12. "Pollen" – 2:27
13. "Small Town" – 1:17
14. "Water and Sleep" – 4:00
15. "Telephone Wires" – 2:30
16. "Words Cannot Describe" – 2:22

== Personnel ==
- Mirah - Choir/Chorus, Composer, Primary Artist, Recorder
- John Golden - Mastering
- Paul West - Piano
- Amber Bell - Choir/Chorus, Photography
- Arrington de Dionyso - Choir/Chorus, Flute
- Phil Elvrum - Choir/Chorus, Multi Instruments
- Jenn Kliese - Choir/Chorus, violin
- Khaela Maricich - Photography
- Ariana Murray - Choir/Chorus
