= Storageland =

EP by Mirah
- Released: 1997
- Genre: Indie rock
- Length: 23:34

Mirah chronology
Storageland (1997)	You Think It's Like This but Really It's Like This (2000)

Professional ratings
Review scores
Source	Rating
Allmusic	3/5 stars

Storageland is the first release by musician Mirah, released independently as a vinyl EP in 1997. The album received largely positive reviews, and listeners were "drawn to the unpolished sound...with its sometimes muffled vocals, raw guitars, and background-noise cracklings."

== Production ==
The EP was released independently in 1997. All tracks are on one side of the 12", and the B-side is an etching by Nikki McClure. Mirah is the primary artist, while contributing musicians include Bryce Panic on drums, Molly Burgdorf on bass on tracks, Jessie Breznau on violin, and Pat Maley on organ.

== Reception ==
The album received a positive review in Allmusic, and a score of 3/5. Listeners were "drawn to the unpolished sound...with its sometimes muffled vocals, raw guitars, and background-noise cracklings", wrote Laura Leebove in Venus Zine.

== Track listing ==
1. "Telescope" – 2:42
2. "Pretty Eyes" – 1:48
3. "Where's My Heart?" – 2:54
4. "In a Sailboat" – 2:48
5. "Storm" – 3:06
6. "1982 (Atari)" – 1:30

== Personnel ==
- Mirah Yom Tov Zeitlyn – guitar, synthesizer, voice
- Bryce Panic – drums on tracks 2–5
- Molly Burgdorf – bass on tracks 2 and 5
- Jessie Breznau – violin on track 4
- Pat Maley – organ on tracks 2 and 5
