= Small Sale (EP) =

Small Sale EP

EP by Mirah
- Released: 2001
- Recorded: 2000/2001
- Genre: Indie rock
- Length: Approximately 12 min.
- Label: Modern Radio Records (7")
- Producer: Bobby Burg, Mirah, Diana Arens

Mirah chronology
Advisory Committee (2001)	Small Sale EP (2001)	Cold Cold Water EP (2002)

Small Sale EP is a 2001 album by Mirah, released on Modern Radio Records. It was positively received by AllMusic, who stated "Mirah's sweetly expressive, breathy voice...is intoxicatingly endearing, as are the electronic beats and textures she uses as deftly as she does a ukulele or acoustic guitar."

== History ==
Songs recorded 1999–2001 at Mirah's House & Dub Narcotic, while Mirah was still touring for her previous album. Engineered by Mirah, Bobby Burg & Diana Arens. 505 copies were pressed on black vinyl with 8 test pressings. Sleeve was designed by K. Mroczek and Amber Bell and printed on Combination Press using silkscreen, letterpress and file folders.

== Reception ==
Professional ratings
Review scores
Source	Rating
AllMusic	4/5 stars

It was positively received by AllMusic, who stated "Mirah's sweetly expressive, breathy voice, that she inflects like Lucinda Williams and occasionally Juliana Hatfield, is intoxicatingly endearing, as are the electronic beats and textures she uses as deftly as she does a ukulele or acoustic guitar. Mirah is a rare musician who actually sounds dedicated to and confident in her art, and the byproduct is a fresh, liberating set of songs."

== Track listing ==
No.	Title	Length
1.	"Don't Go"
2.	"Dreamboat"
3.	"Music"
4.	"Birthday Present"
5.	"Lonestar"

== Personnel ==
- Mirah - Engineer, Multi Instruments, Primary Artist, Vocals
- Stan Ricker - Mastering
- Bobby Burg - producer
- Diana Arens - producer
