= Songs from the Black Mountain Music Project =

Studio album by Mirah & Ginger Brooks Takahashi
- Released: August 19, 2003
- Recorded: 2002
- Genre: Indie rock; sound collage
- Length: 28:53
- Label: K Records

Mirah & Ginger Brooks Takahashi chronology
Cold Cold Water EP (2002)	Songs from the Black Mountain Music Project (2003)	To All We Stretch the Open Arm (2004)

Songs from the Black Mountain Music Project is a collaboration between Mirah and Ginger Brooks Takahashi with assorted guests. The album consists of nine full-length songs, interspersed with nine shorter instrumental interludes.

== Production ==
The eighteen-track album was written by Mirah and Takahashi in a secluded house in the Blue Ridge Mountains in 2002, where the friends spent a month writing songs about their experience together, and recording using a Tascam four-track, and a mini-disc recorder. According to Allmusic, "the chirping birds, lonesome train whistles, and buzzing insects that pop up throughout Songs from the Black Mountain Music Project make it feel like a collection of audio postcards from Takahashi and Mirah's vacation."

== Release and reception ==
Professional ratings
Review scores
Source	Rating
AllMusic	3.5/5 stars
Pitchfork	7.1/10

K Records released the album on August 19, 2003. It received a positive reception from AllMusic, who gave it 3.5/5 stars, and praised both the vocals, instrumentals, and whimsical and emotional nature of the songwriting. A reviewer for Pitchfork commented that the album is "a 28-minute sound collage that nestles five or six songs among freeform instrumentals, unprocessed ideas and found sounds", and added that "I don't know what's at the root of this need to bury songs in ephemera, but it's beginning to look a lot like fear of responsibility."

== Track listing ==
- All tracks without noted composer are interludes not listed in the CD liner notes.
1. "Lil' Bit (Of Baritone)" (Takahashi)
2. "Birdy Noises"
3. "Plink Plink Plink"
4. "The Red Curtain" (Takahashi/M. Zeitlyn)
5. "The Knife Thrower" (Takahashi/M. Zeitlyn)
6. "The Party" (Takahashi/M. Zeitlyn)
7. "Noisy Groove"
8. "Life You Love" (M. Zeitlyn)
9. "Plink Plink"
10. "Broken Mirah"
11. "Pure" (E. Zeitlyn)
12. "Acoustic Groove"
13. "While We Have The Sun" (M. Zeitlyn)
14. "Horny Groove"
15. "Rock Of Ages" (Marcus)
16. "Squocky Groove"
17. "Oh! September" (Hockel/Takahashi/M. Zeitlyn)
18. "Buggy Noises"

== Personnel ==
- Mirah - primary artist, various instruments
- Ginger Brooks Takahashi - primary artist, various instruments
- Steve Hockel - composer
