= Share This Place: Stories and Observations =

Studio album by Mirah and Spectratone International
- Released: 2007
- Genre: Indie rock, indie pop
- Length: 47:34
- Label: K Records

Mirah and Spectratone International chronology
Joyride: Remixes (2006)	Share This Place: Stories and Observations (2007)	The Old Days Feeling (2008)

Share This Place: Stories and Observations is a collaborative album between Mirah and Spectratone International (Lori Goldston and Kyle Hanson), released on K Records in 2007. The subject matter revolves around the lives of insects. Stop motion films by Britta Johnson were also a part of the project, which received a positive reception in publications such as AllMusic and Pitchfork.

== Production ==
For the 2007 album, Mirah collaborated with Spectratone International, an ensemble formed by former Black Cat Orchestra founder and cellist Lori Goldston and accordionist Kyle Hanson. The songs are about the lives of insects. The project was inspired by the writing of 19th century entomologist and poet J. Henri Fabre, as well as The Insect Play by Karel Čapek. It was released on K Records.

== Reception ==
Professional ratings
Review scores
Source	Rating
AllMusic	4/5 stars
Pitchfork	7.7/10

According to AllMusic, "Share This Place begins with an interesting concept that becomes something richer than might be expected. Paired with Johnson's films and in their own right, [the songs] are intricate and beautifully made, giving a larger scale to the big events in these tiny lives -- birth, death, mating, eating, sacrifice, survival -- while keeping the details that make them fascinating."

== Track listing ==
All tracks are written by Mirah Yom Tov Zeitlyn, Lori Goldston, Kyle Hanson.

No.	Title	Length
1.	"Community"
2.	"Gestation of the Sacred Beetle"
3.	"Following the Sun"
4.	"My Prize"
5.	"Supper"
6.	"Song of Psyche"
7.	"Luminescence"
8.	"Emergence of the Primary Larva"
9.	"My Lord Who Hums"
10.	"Ecdysis"
11.	"Love Song of the Fly"
12.	"Credo Cigalia"

== Personnel ==
- Mirah Yom Tov Zeitlyn - writing
- Lori Goldston - writing
- Kyle Hanson - writing
- Britta Johnson - short films of stop-motion animation
