= Joyride: Remixes =

Remix album by Mirah
- Released: November 21, 2006
- Genre: Indie rock
- Length: 75:54
- Label: K Records

Mirah chronology
| C'mon Miracle (2004) | Joyride: Remixes (2006) | Share This Place: Stories and Observations (2007) |

Joyride: Remixes is a double CD, containing remixes of Mirah's material, by K Records artists. Released by K Records on November 21, 2006, it received a 3.5/5 from Tiny Mix Tapes.

== Production ==
Released by K Records on November 21, 2006, artists include Guy Sigsworth, Anna Oxygen, Tender Forever, Yacht, Mount Eerie, Khaela Maricich, Lucky Dragons and Electrosexual.

== Reception ==
Professional ratings
Review scores
| Source | Rating |
|---|---|
| AllMusic | 3.5/5 stars |
| Tiny Mix Tapes | 3/5 stars |

The album was positively received, receiving 3.5/5 from AllMusic and 3/5 from Tiny Mix Tapes.

== Track listing ==
Disc 1

1. "The Light" (Hooliganship) – 1:50
2. "La Familia" (Guy Sigsworth) – 2:53
3. "Monument" (Anna Oxygen) – 3:07
4. "Nobody Has to Stay" (Shawn Parke) – 2:21
5. "Don’t Die in Me" (Bryce Panic) – 3:47
6. "Apples in the Trees" (Pash) – 3:02
7. "Sweepstakes Prize" (Ben Adorable) – 4:36
8. "Make It Hot" (Tender Forever) – 3:15
9. "Advisory Committee" (Shok) – 4:32
10. "Dogs of B.A." (Krts) – 5:10
11. "Jerusalem" (Yacht) – 3:08

Disc 2

1. "Don’t Die in Me" (Mount Eerie) – 3:20
2. "The Fruits of Your Garden" (Khaela Maricich) – 2:15
3. "Mt. St. Helens" (Shawn Parke) – 3:45
4. "Make It Hot" (Yacht) – 2:52
5. "Pollen" (Lucky Dragons) – 3:16
6. "Cold Cold Water" (Electrosexual & Abberline) – 3:09
7. "Advisory Committee" (Emily Kingan) – 4:56
8. "La Familia" (Chris Baker) – 3:29
9. "We're Both So Sorry" (Scream Club) – 3:53
10. "The Light" (DJ Beyonda) – 3:19
11. "Apples in the Trees" (Bryce Panic) – 3:59
