= Eric Lindley =

American singer (born 1982)

- Born: 1982 (age 43–44)
- Origin: Los Angeles
- Occupations: Writer, musician, artist
- Years active: 2003–present
- Label: Sounds Super Recordings
- Website: http://www.ericlindley.com

Eric Lindley (born December 10, 1982) is an American artist, writer, and musician working primarily in Los Angeles and New York City under the name Careful. His work includes recorded and live "glitch folk," works of fiction, poetry, performance art, photography, and interactive installation.

Lindley attended Dartmouth College, where he studied music under Charles Dodge and Larry Polansky. He graduated Darthmouth in 2005 with degree in physics and music; his honors thesis was titled Theoretical Extensions and Compositional Applications of James Tenney's Theories of Temporal Gestalt Perception in Music. Lindley went to graduate school at the California Institute of the Arts, where he studied composition with composer James Tenney. During graduate school he released the album Nightcat! under the moniker Careful, which was recorded at John Vanderslice's Tiny Telephone studio in Mission District, San Francisco. He also scored numerous short and feature films, as well as several performance works at CalArts. He was active in the Los Angeles music scene, playing with Anna Oxygen, Lucky Dragons, and Phil Elverum of The Microphones at venues like The Smell. Lindley graduated CalArts in 2008 with an MFA in Music, Writing, and Integrated Media.

In 2008, he moved to New York, where he released both "Careful" and "Oh, Light," the latter recorded in his partner's closet in Washington Heights, Manhattan. There, he also recorded a cover of Lady Gaga's "Bad Romance."

== Discography ==
- Nightcat! (Sounds Super Recordings, 2006)
- Careful (Sounds Super Recordings, 2010)
- Oh, Light (Sounds Super Recordings, 2010)
- Because I Am Always Talking (2012)
- The World Doesn't End (2014)
