= Miwa Matreyek =

Miwa Matreyek is a director, animator, and designer working in Los Angeles, California. In 2007, Matreyek received her MFA in Experimental Animation and Integrated Media at the California Institute of the Arts. While being a student, she developed her talent and passion for animation and collage. Matreyek collaborated with fellow students and interactive multi-media expert Chi-wang Yang and American singer Anna Oxygen to form a theater company called Cloud Eye Control. Miwa Matreyek blends animation, collage, and performance together in order to present her work of art to the public. She uses her own shadow body, rear-projected animation, and perfect timing in her work. Matreyek won the Student Grand Prize at the Platform Festival for her thesis project performance Dreaming of Lucid Living in 2007. She is known for her performance Myth and Infrastructure (2010) and her short film Lumerence (2012), which its premiere was presented at the reputable TED Global Conference in Oxford, England in July 2010. Matreyek's art (performances, short films, and installations) have been presented in many conferences, festivals, museums, schools and art centres.

== Career ==
Miwa Matreyek's first performance Ocean Flight (2005) is a piece of art put together with the help of MFA student Chi-wang Yang and singer Anna Oxygen. Matreyek will wait two years before putting out another animated performance. Matreyek's second performance, Dreaming of Lucid Living (2007), was her M.F.A thesis project. Her work was nominated for the Student Grand Prize at the Platform Festival, which she won.

Two years later, in 2009, Matreyek's work was globally praised with the release of a short film, Panorama City (2009). In the same year, Matreyek had an installation called City Lights (2009). The installation is a mix of the artist's different talents like animation, collages, and her shadow body. Matreyek's second short film, Lumerence (2012), came out three years after her first short film, Panorama City. The film has a more experimental approach, since she used collages and digital software to add a narrative to her story.

The next performance presentated by Matreyek was This World Made Itself released in 2013. Once again, she used her own body to make shadow silhouettes, collages, and digital software to realize the performance. The third animated performance by Miwa Matreyek is Myth and Infrastructure (2010). The artist had the opportunity to present the work of art in front of a live audience at TED Global 2010, which gave her a lot of visibility. She also performed the same work five years later in Zurich, in Switzerland, at the Museum for Design.

== Influences ==
Being half Japanese, Matreyek is very much influenced by her childhood memories in her art. The Japanese landscapes and architecture can be observed in her work. Russian constructivism is an important influence in Matreyek's art, as well as the surrealist collage technique. The famous French filmmakers Georges Méliès and Michel Gondry are also two important figures who inspired Matreyek's work.

== Filmography ==
Year	Title	Notes
2005	Ocean Flight	Performance
2007	Dreaming of Lucid Living	Performance
2009	Panorama City	Short Film
2010	Myth and Infrastructure	Performance
2012	Lumerence	Short Film
2013	This World Made Itself	Performance
