= Half Waif =

American singer

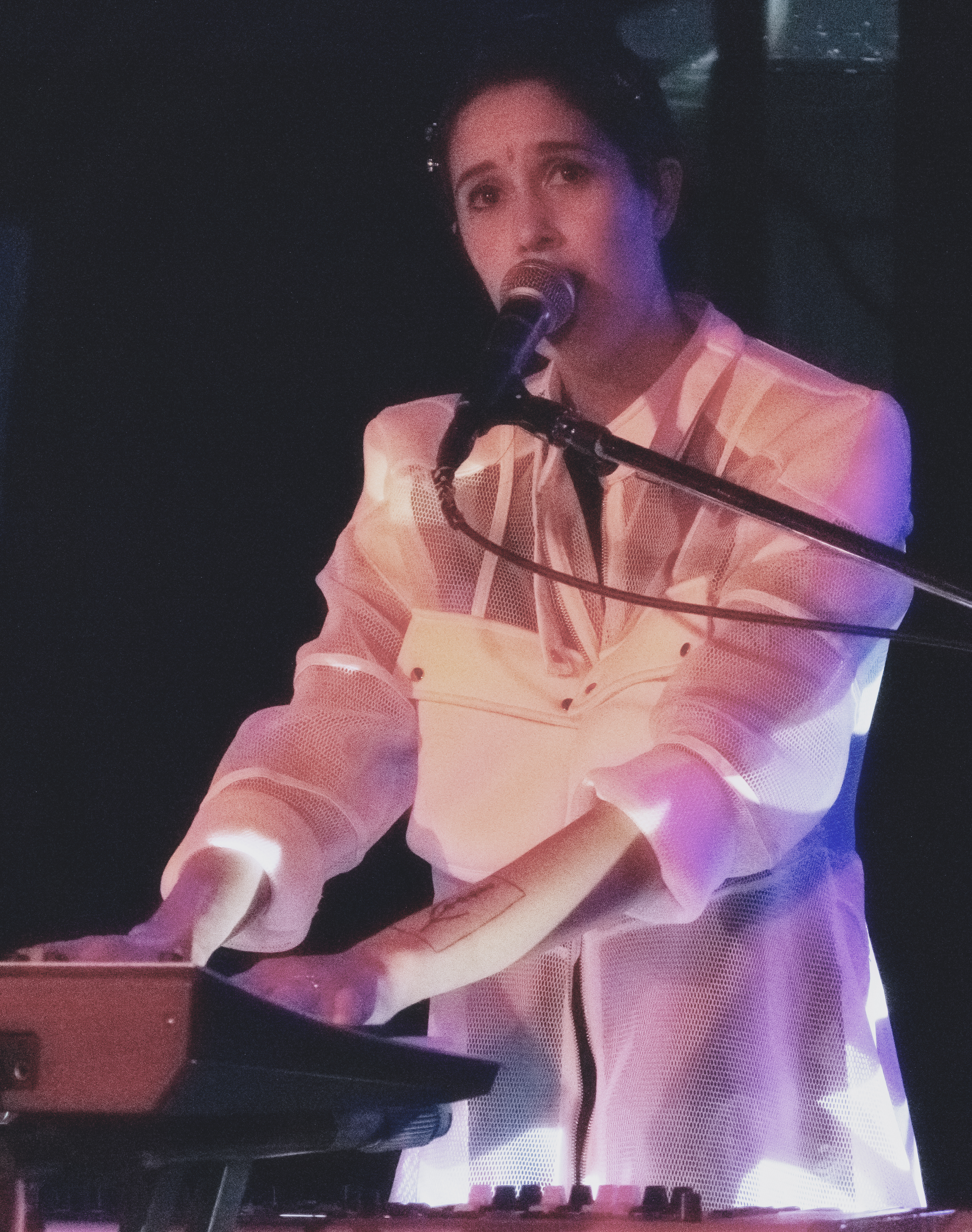

Background information
- Also known as: Nandi Rose
- Born: Ananda Rose Plunkett
- Genres: Synth-pop; Dream pop; electronic
- Occupations: Singer-songwriter; producer
- Labels: Cascine; Anti-
- Formerly of: Pinegrove
- Website: halfwaif.com

Half Waif is the stage name of American musician Ananda Rose "Nandi" Plunkett.

== Early life ==
Born to an Indian mother from Uganda, Rose grew up in Williamstown, Massachusetts. Her parents divorced when she was a child.

Rose began writing music when she was a child in Massachusetts. She later attended Kenyon College.

== History ==
A former member of the indie rock band Pinegrove, Rose released her first full-length album as Half Waif in 2014, titled Kotekan. She followed it up with the release in 2016 of her second full-length album, titled Probable Depths. In 2017, she released an EP titled form/a.

Rose released her third full-length album as Half Waif in 2018, titled Lavender. The album received a 7.8 out of 10 rating from Pitchfork and became Stereogum's album of the week on its release. At the end of the year, it appeared in some publications' best-of-the-year lists, ranking notably in such lists by Stereogum (17th), The Skinny (27th), Loud and Quiet (40th), and The 405 (41st).

In April 2021, Rose announced her fifth album, Mythopoetics, with a July 9 release date.

Rose's music has been described as synth-pop and electronic.

== Personal life ==
Rose is married to Pinegrove member Zack Levine.

== Discography ==
=== Studio albums ===
- Kotekan (2014)
- Probable Depths (2016)
- Lavender (2018)
- The Caretaker (2020)
- Mythopoetics (2021)
- See You at the Maypole (2024)

=== EPs ===
- form/a (2017)
