= Advisory Committee =

Studio album by Mirah
- Released: March 19, 2002
- Recorded: September 17, 2000–July 4, 2001
- Genre: Indie rock
- Length: 37:50
- Label: K Records
- Producer: Mirah; Phil Elvrum

Mirah chronology
| You Think It's Like This but Really It's Like This (2000) | Advisory Committee (2002) | Small Sale EP (2001) |

Advisory Committee is Mirah's second album. It was released on K Records on March 19, 2002, and produced by both Mirah and Phil Elvrum.

== Production ==
Advisory Committee was recorded over a one-year period, starting on September 17, 2000 and ending on July 4, 2001. It was produced by both Mirah and Phil Elvrum, and was released on K Records on March 19, 2002.

== Reception ==
Professional ratings
Review scores
| Source | Rating |
|---|---|
| AllMusic | 4.5/5 stars |
| Pitchfork | 8.3/10 |

The album was well-received, earning an AllMusic score of 4.5/5, and a Pitchfork score of 8.3/10, who praised the maturity of her voice and lyrics.

== Track listing ==
1. "Cold Cold Water" – 5:09
2. "After You Left" – 1:38
3. "Make It Hot" – 2:30
4. "Mt. St. Helens" – 4:08
5. "Recommendation" – 1:20
6. "Body Below" – 4:08
7. "The Sun" – 3:14
8. "Advisory Committee" – 2:57
9. "Special Death" – 2:32
10. "The Garden" – 2:21
11. "Light the Match" – 3:00
12. "Apples in the Trees" – 2:01
13. "Monument" – 2:51
14. "Untitled" – 1:31

== Personnel ==
- Mirah - Bass Pedals, Bells, Composer, Drums (Steel), Engineer, Guitar, Layout Design, Machines, Mixing, Organ, Percussion, Piano, Primary Artist, Pump Organ, Vocals, Xylophone
- Phil Elvrum - Engineer, Mixing
- Chris Adolph - Bass Pedals, Engineer, Melodica, Moog Synthesizer, Musical Saw, Xylophone
- Mark Greer - Mastering
- Ed Varga - Mixing
- Bobby Burg - Engineer, Loop, Percussion
- Nora Danielson - Strings, Violin
- Aaron Hartman - String Bass
- Khaela Maricich - Choir/Chorus, Guitar
- Ariana Murray - Choir/Chorus
- Bryce Panic - Bass Pedals, Drums, Percussion, Vocals
- Kory Ross - Drums
- Tae Won Yu - Photography
