= C'mon Miracle =

Studio album by Mirah
- Released: May 4, 2004
- Recorded: 2003
- Genre: Indie rock
- Length: 36:14
- Label: K Records
- Producer: Phil Elvrum

Mirah chronology
To All We Stretch the Open Arm (2004)	C'mon Miracle (2004)	Joyride: Remixes (2006)

C'mon Miracle is Mirah's third full-length solo album. Produced by Phil Elvrum, the indie rock album was released on K Records on May 4, 2004.

== Production ==
When Mirah visited South America, specifically Argentina, she was struck by the music and culture, and several songs on C'mon Miracle reflect her experience, most notably "The Dogs of B.A."

== Reception ==
Professional ratings
Review scores
Source	Rating
AllMusic	4/5 stars
Pitchfork	(8.5/10)

The album was met with positive reception, getting 4/5 from AllMusic, and 8.5/10 from Pitchfork.

== Track listing ==
All tracks are written by Mirah.

No.	Title	Length
1.	"Nobody Has to Stay"	2:46
2.	"Jerusalem"	2:20
3.	"The Light"	3:18
4.	"Don't Die in Me"	3:48
5.	"Look Up!"	2:25
6.	"We're Both So Sorry"	4:36
7.	"The Dogs of B.A."	4:32
8.	"The Struggle"	2:39
9.	"You've Gone Away Enough"	3:08
10.	"Promise"	3:14
11.	"Exactly Where We're From"	3:21

== Personnel ==
- Mirah - primary artist
- Phil Elvrum - producer
