= Horacio Guarany =

Argentine folklore singer and writer

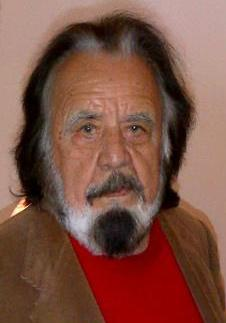
- Horacio Guarany in 2011

Background information
- Born: Eraclio Catalín Rodríguez Cereijo; May 15, 1925; Las Garzas, Argentina
- Died: January 13, 2017 (aged 91) Luján, Argentina
- Genre: Argentine folk music
- Occupations: Musician, composer, writer
- Instruments: Guitar, vocals

Eraclio Catalin Rodríguez Cereijo, better known as Horacio Guarany (May 15, 1925 – January 13, 2017), was one of the main Argentine folklore singers, and a writer. Guarany died on January 13, 2017, at the age of 91.

== Biography ==
He was born in Las Garzas, Santa Fe Province, the thirteenth child of Jorge Rodríguez, a Guaraní man from Corrientes, and Feliciana Cereijo, a Spanish woman from León. He was a member and supporter of the Communist Party of Argentina, which led to him being persecuted by the Argentine Anticommunist Alliance, and forced him into exile in 1974. He settled in Venezuela, later moving to Mexico and Spain. He returned to Argentina in 1978. The military dictatorship made all their records disappear, in addition to censoring the diffusion of some songs such as "La guerrillera" or "Coplera del prisionero", among others.

== Political activism ==
After the overthrow of Juan Domingo Perón, he joined the Communist Party; during the presidencies of Eduardo Lonardi and Pedro Eugenio Aramburu, he used to say that he belonged to "the glorious Communist Party," which caused him difficulties.
