= Electrosexual =

French electronic musician

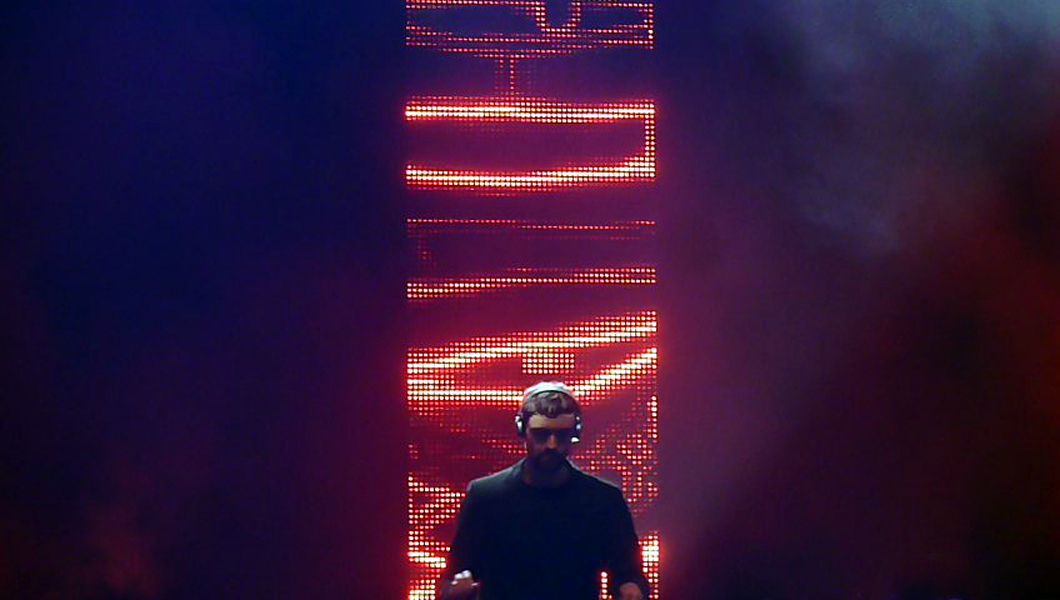
- Electrosexual during a performance in 2014

Background information
- Also known as: Romain Frequency
- Born: 28 July 1975 (age 51); Paris, France
- Origin: Toulouse, France
- Genres: French house; house; electronica; electro house; nu disco; alternative dance; synth-pop; electronic
- Instruments: Keyboards; vocals; guitar; percussion
- Website: www.electrosexual-official.com

Electrosexual is a French electronic musician, composer, performer, record producer and music video director living in Berlin. Electrosexual has been described by The Guardian as one of the key figures of French Electroclash alongside Miss Kittin & The Hacker and Vitalic. Electrosexual has worked with other musicians such as Peaches, Aérea Negrot, Billie Ray Martin, Hanin Elias, Kiko and David Carretta.

== Career ==
Electrosexual's passion for early electronic music instruments and primitive sounds from analog synthesizers inspired their mingling arpeggiated bass with an uptempo rhythm. They are the electro-sex (sometimes called sex-tronica) precursor and pioneer in France. They are an advocate of LGBT rights.

Electrosexual created their stage name in reference to surrealistic non "(human) sexuality", considering machines and synthesizers as genitors, following in the footsteps of David Cronenberg, H.R. Giger, Chris & Cosey and Add N to (X).

In the summer of 2005, Electrosexual performed for the first time as a solo act at the Sage Club in Berlin, as part of the Plastique party. Following this debut performance, the track “Trapped Inside” was selected for inclusion on the fifth anniversary compilation of the Berlin-based record label Das Drehmoment, marking an early milestone in their recording career.

The same year, Electrosexual founded their own record label and music platform, Rock Machine Records (named after the French title of Norman Spinrad's novel Little Heroes), to maintain full creative and production independence.

Electrosexual produced for the American queer hip hop duo Scream Club, combining electronic dance music with lyrics addressing gender and queer politics alongside club-oriented performances. Their first collaboration "Fine as Fuck" featuring vocals by Peaches, was released in 2006 as the first 12" Picture Disc vinyl on the Rock Machine label. Electrosexual and Scream Club continued to collaborate and perform live internationally in the following years. In 2010, they released two further EPs, including Break You Nice / Screaming & Crying, featuring Shunda K. The record was issued as a limited edition white vinyl and included remixes by Hard Ton, Leonard De Leonard, and Divider.. The music video for “Break You Nice,” directed by Electrosexual, was their first work as a director and received rotation on MTV and VH1 for several months.

The same year, Shunda K of Yo Majesty asked Electrosexual to co-produce her first solo single "Here I Am To Save The World" (2010, Fanatic Records).

In March and April 2010, Electrosexual and Scream Club supported Robots in Disguise "Wake Up Tour" in the UK. They performed the "Wake Up" Electrosexual & Scream Club Remix as an encore.

Sue Denim of the Robots in Disguise recorded vocals for Electrosexual's EP "Partytime" featuring Scream Club, released as a Digi-EP, with remixes by aMinus, Kumbia Queers and French hip hop artist Flore.

At the end of 2010, Electrosexual released "I Feel Love" that quickly became an underground club hit. The song was referred to as "a disco neo classic" and "best song of the year 2012" by the blogosphere.

Electrosexual has remixed material by other artists, including Billie Ray Martin and Aérea Negrot, David Carretta's "Lovely Toy", I Monster’s "Sucker For Your Sound", Mirah’s "Cold Cold Water", Ssion’s "Ah-Ma", Peaches featuring Scream Club "Fine As Fuck" & Shero´s Berlin Moon.

They composed the official themes for the 2011 and 2012 "Ecrans Mixtes" LGBTQ movie festivals in Lyons, where they also performed.

Electrosexual performed at events including the Waves festival in Vienna, the Paradiso, at Paris's Le nouveau Casino and La Machine du Moulin Rouge or in Berlin's Berghain Kantine, SO36 Barcelona's Apolo2, Munich´s Rote Sonne and presented a sound and video installation for the Digital Arts Show ´Turn Around´ in Berghain in 2015.

After a series of single and EPs with various guest vocalists, Electrosexual released in 2014 their debut album "Art Support Machine", a mixture of retro-futuristic analogue electronics and kaleidoscopic synths. The album is influenced by 1980s synthwave, techno and prototrance. Only four tracks are instrumental on the LP.

Art Support Machine explores the Machine as the supreme vision of the human condition, and is focusing on the concept of the identity of the Machines, their gender, sexuality and soul. The album has received strong DJ support from Laurent Garnier “Loving this, will play everywhere”, Hard Ton (International_DeeJay_Gigolo_Records) and David Carretta who remixed its first single Tempelhof

The 2014 single "The way they make you feel" received a special 9/10 mention by Mixmag magazine comparing it to Juan_Atkins's Model 500

In 2024 Electrosexual released the song "Tomorrow" on French electronic key figure Kiko´s album Digital Family, also including collaboration tracks with Etienne De Crecy, Oxia and The Hacker

== Production and equipment ==
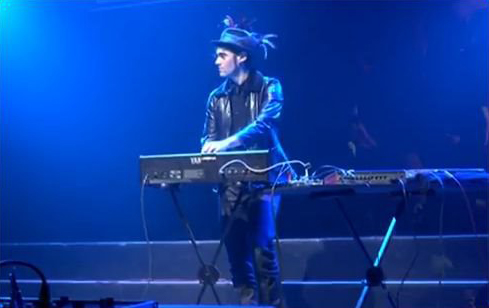
Electrosexual performing Live at Amsternam's Paradiso with a Yamaha CS5 and Moog Rogue in 2010.

Electrosexual is currently known for the strong use of analog synthesizers in their music. They stated in an interview with Add N to (X) front woman Ann Shenton for Zoot Magazine, that they use the Korg MS-10/MS-20, Moog Rogue, Yamaha CS 5 and Roland JX-3P. Additional gear includes the Ensoniq DP4+ and multi-effects pedals.

== Discography ==
=== Albums ===
Year	Title	Format	Label
2016	Art Support Remix	Digital	Rock Machine Records
2014	Art Support Machine	LP Picture Disc & Digital	Rock Machine Records

=== Singles and EPs ===
Year	Title
2026	"Body Work incl. Kiko Remix (Melopee Obscur Records)"
2025	"Like That & Aquatic Love featuring Nicky Miller (Rock Machine Records)"
2024	"Tomorrow (with Kiko) on the album Digital Family (Hot Banana Records)"
2024	"We Dance Together, We Fight Together Incl. Mala Ika Remix (Weirdos Records)"
2023	"Age Of Access feat.Mavin Incl. Lazercat Remix (Rock Machine Records)"
2022	"Lèvres Roses feat. Nicky Miller (Klub Kid Records)"
2022	"Divine Lust (Singular Arts Group)"
2021	"(how to) Change Your Mind"
2021	"Free Yourself"
2020	"Watch Me Lakshmi" featuring Karma She
2018	"Darkroom"
2018	"The Way They Make You Feel"
2016	"Hold Me" & "Kraken" featuring Hanin Elias
2016	"I'm Your Machine" featuring Hard Ton
2015	"Silver Soul"
2015	"Fetish (A.S.F.R.)" incl. Mondowski Remix
2014	"Automatic People" featuring Hanin Elias
2014	"Tempelhof" incl. David Carretta Remix
2013	"Lay My Eye"
2013	"Devolution" incl. remixes by Tubbe, Henning Specht and Lois Plugged & Fruckie
2013	"Demolition"
2012	"Discolition"
2012	"Heading for the Moon"
2011	"Trapped Inside"
2010	"I Feel Love"
2010	"Break You Nice" featuring Scream Club
2006	I'm Going Crazy/Fine as Fuck EP featuring Scream Club and Peaches

=== Remixes ===
- Captain Mustache feat Mel E Logan - Pen Weapon (Electrosexual remix) Mobilee Records
- Hence (Daryl_Bamonte+ Knuth - Sex Dwarf (Electrosexual Remix) Cosmic Cassette records
- Unconscious Honey - Darkroom Tease (Electrosexual´s extended pleasure remix) Random Records
- Karma She – "Why She Dance"(Electrosexual remix) KlubKid Records
- Jørgen Thorvald – "Hypno"(Electrosexual remix) Nu Body Records
- Sherø – "Berlin Moon"(Electrosexual remix) KlubKid Records
- Sky Deep – "Yes I Did"(Electrosexual remix) Reveller Records
- Millimetric – "Deflection"(Electrosexual remix) Nu Body Records
- Rituel (Christophe Monier of The_Micronauts) – "Dreams"(Electrosexual remix)
- Plasticzooms – "Quite Cleary"(Electrosexual remix) Vinyl Junkie Records
- Autist – "Chien"(Electrosexual remix)[unreleased]
- Plasticzooms – "Veiled Eyes"(Electrosexual remix)
- Billie Ray Martin & Aérea Negrot – "Off The Rails"(Electrosexual remix)
- Billie Ray Martin & Aérea Negrot – "Off The Rails"(Electrosexual dub)
- Ost + Front – "MNSTR" – (Electrosexual remix) Out Of Line Records
- Adan & Ilse – "Like Me" – (Electrosexual remix) Unknown Pleasures Records
- Autist – "Low Passion"(Electrosexual remix)
- Lois Plugged & Fruckie – "Spleen" – (Electrosexual remix) Boxon Records
- aMinus – "Morning After thrill" – (Electrosexual remix)
- Fantôme – "Love" (Electrosexual remix) Cleopatra records/Rough Trade
- Dualesque – "Uncomplicated" (Electrosexual Complicated remix)
- Desireless & Operation of the Sun – "Sertao" (Electrosexual remix)
- Tubbe – "Liebe Fertig" (Electrosexual remix) Audiolith Records
- aMinus Feat Magritte Jaco – "Don't Mind Me now" (Electrosexual remix)
- Hedi Mohr – "Little Red" Feat. Red Noise(Electrosexual remix) Black Mink Rec
- Tkuz – "In The Box" (Electrosexual remix) Black Leather
- Dead Sexy Inc. – "Lonesome Poupée" (Electrosexual remix + Le Bardot remix)
- Equitant – "Body Vehement" (Electrosexual remix) Black Montanas
- The Niallist – "Work It" (Electrosexual remix)
- Steve Morell & Monika Pokorna – "Lady Pheres" (Electrosexual remix) Pale Music International
- Peaches Feat Shunda K. – "Billionaire" (Electrosexual remix)
- Transformer di Roboter – "Baghdad Disco" (Electrosexual remix) Leonizer Records
- Vesto Caino – "Dolce Vita" (Electrosexual remix) Sony/Columbia
- Minor Sailor – "Doctor Said" (Electrosexual remix) Les Boutiques Sonores
- Robots in Disguise – "Wake Up" (Electrosexual remix) President Records
- Fil Ok – "Listen To Me" (Electrosexual remix) OK Music
- I Monster – "Sucker for Your Sound" (Electrosexual remix) Twins of Evil Records
- Ssion – "Ah-Ma" (Electrosexual remix) Sleazetone Records
- Candy Clash – "79" (Electrosexual remix) Sister Records
- Keen K & P Muench – "Connection Flight" (Electrosexual Radionnection) Perfect Stranger Records
- Dusti – "New York Slaves" (Electrosexual Slavery) Rock Machine Records
- Mirah – "Cold Cold Water" (Electrosexual & Abberline remix) K Records
- David Carretta – "Lovely Toy" (Electrosexual remix) Space Factory disques
- Punk Bunny – "Next Caller" & "G-Spot" (Electrosexual remix) Crunch Records
- Lesbians on Ecstasy – "Tell Me Does She Love the Bass" (Electrosexual remix) Alien8 Recordings
- Houston Bernard "Str8 Acting" – (Electrosexual remix) MOFA Schallplatten

=== DJ mixes ===
- The Acid Tape (Rock Machine Records)
- The Beat Tape (Rock Machine Records)
- Art Support Mixtape (Track listings 2.0)
- The Wrangeltape (Wrangelkiez)
- Long Live The New Flesh (Novafuture Blog)
- The Razortape, Vol. 1 (Rock Machine Records)
- The VogueTape, Vol. 2 (Rock Machine Records)
- The VogueTape, Vol. 1 (Rock Machine Records)
- The Rock Machine Mix Series, Vol. 1 (Rock Machine Records)

== Filmography ==
Year	Film	Role	Notes
May 2009	Electrosexual & Scream Club BREAK YOU NICE Music Video	Director/Editor	Shot in Berlin's Wirr Warr art gallery. Cast: The Heartbreaker:Cindy Wonderful, The Foxy Femme:Sarah Adorable, The Hedonist:Sunday The Sadist: Zoe Vermillion, and, Hank Bobbit, Aline & Vaness.
September 2009	FAX ART	Director/Editor	Art Film Commissioned by N.Y. Bienale Art 2009
September 2010	Electrosexual I Feel Love Music Video	Director/Editor/Himself	Shot in Berlin on 23 March 17 August and 7 September 2010. Cast: Mz Sunday Luv: The Puppet, Jessie Evans (singer): The Prisoner, Jay Grand: The Filmmaker, Electrosexual: The Magician .
November 2010	Jessie Evans Ninos Del Espacio Music Video	Co-Director	Shot in Berlin (Haus Of Ophelia) in November 2010. Cast: Jessie Evans (singer), Rubbish Fairy, Lady Balloon, The Sexy Freaks Of Berlin.
April 2011	Electrosexual & Scream Club Feat Sue Denim Partytime Music Video	Director/Editor/Himself	Shot in Berlin in July 2010. Plays performance artist in collaboration with Robots in Disguise's Sue Denim & Scream Club.
July 2012	Electrosexual Heading for the Moon Music Video	Director	Shot in Berlin in May 2012. Cast:Electrosexual, Sigrid Elliott.
Sept 2014	Electrosexual Automatic People" Feat Hanin Elias Music Video	Director	Shot in Berlin in August 2014. Cast:Hanin Elias, Electrosexual, Jay Stanway.
June 2016	Electrosexual I'm Your Machine" Feat Hard Ton Music Video	Director (as Romain Frequency)	Shot in Berlin in June 2016.
Dec 2018	Electrosexual Darkroom" Music Video	Director (as Romain Frequency)	Shot in Berlin in Sept 2018
