= Blippo+ =

2025 video game

- Developers: Yacht; Telefantasy Studios; Noble Robot
- Publisher: Panic Inc.
- Director: Jona Bechtolt
- Producers: Jona Bechtolt; Claire L. Evans; JJ Stratford
- Programmer: Dustin Mierau
- Writer: Claire L. Evans
- Composers: Rob Kieswetter; Jona Bechtolt
- Platforms: Playdate; Windows; Nintendo Switch; macOS
- Release: May 29, 2025: Playdate; May 29, 2025; Windows; September 23, 2025; Nintendo Switch; September 23, 2025; macOS; January 26, 2026
- Genre: Simulation
- Mode: Single-player

Blippo+ is a full-motion video television simulation video game developed by Yacht, Telefantasy Studios, Noble Robot, and Dustin Mierau, and published by Panic. The game simulates a collection of linear television broadcasts, each with their own live-action programs, which can be watched and switched between by the player to recreate the experience of channel surfing public-access television.

It was first announced for the handheld black and white console Playdate. A full color version was later announced and released for PC and console.

Blippo+ is the first Panic-developed game to be released for both Playdate and other major gaming platforms.

== Premise and gameplay ==
In Blippo+, the player receives transmissions from the fictional alien planet Blip. These come in the form of the planet's principal TV service provider, also called Blippo+. By consuming the alien media, players piece together the culture of Planet Blip and uncover the mystery of a space anomaly nicknamed "The Bend."

Gameplay consists of channel surfing via Blippo+'s Electronic program guide (EPG), receiving messages from the network, and reading through text content. Writer and producer Claire L. Evans described Blippo+ as "a six hour science-fiction movie disguised as a television network disguised as a video game."

The game contains 11 batches of 1-minute television programs, with each batch containing 45–50 different episodes spread across 9–10 different channels. Programs play in real-time similar to traditional linear television. The entire programming block repeats on a 5-minute loop. An additional channel called Femtofax contains text content and serves as a forum-like service for fictional subscribers to the Blippo+ service. The 10th batch ends the story of Blippo+ while the 11th contains credits and outtakes for the individual programs and the project itself.

== Versions ==
Gameplay features and graphical elements vary between the Playdate ("Pee Dee") version and PC/console ("Color") versions of Blippo+, but the core video and text content is similar across both versions.

=== "Pee Dee" version ===
Upon launching the Playdate version of the game, players must use the Playdate's crank and gyroscope to align and lock on to the alien signal, after which they can access the EPG. The game runs on a 11-week real-time cycle, where every Thursday replaces the batch of content available to watch. Players cannot navigate between batches. The "Desktop Electronic Program Guide" (DEPG) page on the official Blippo+ website indicates which week the game is currently on, and what programs and channels are currently available. This is meant to simulate real TV as it allows each person to talk to the community about what they might have missed and catch up in the process.

The Pee Dee version was programmed by Dustin Mierau.

=== "Color" version ===
The PC/console version of Blippo+ (for Windows, macOS, and Nintendo Switch) contains additional features and mechanics as well as full color video content, although the game offers a "Low Data Mode" which displays the 1-bit versions of video content as it appeared in the Playdate version.

The color version does not run on a real-time cycle. Instead, subsequent "packettes" are unlocked after players have watched a certain threshold of material, and players can re-load previous "archived packettes" via an in-game menu. User logs display various statistics including how many times there has been a signal loss and how much time has been spent watching programs.

If a player remains on a single packette for an extended period of time, the image will slowly begin to warp with color bleeding and image distortion. When this happens, a Tuner Calibration option becomes available, where players must adjust various signal values until the picture returns to normal. If players repeatedly ignore a request to calibrate the signal, the image degrades severely and eventually results in a complete "signal loss."

The Color version was developed by Mark LaCroix of Noble Robot.

== Development ==
Panic Inc. showed Yacht a prototype of the Playdate hardware at a music festival in 2015, and invited the band to make a game for them. The concept of Blippo+ was approved by one of Panic's co-founders Cabel Sasser. According to the Los Angeles Times, Blippo+ was in production for a year, followed by a year of post-production. The footage was shot with real analog television equipment to give the game the appearance of being a collection of real programs from the 1990s.

The COVID-19 pandemic led to general disruptions in the entertainment industry, allowing the developers to hire talent and use props they would otherwise not have been able to access, according to Creative Bloq. There were intentions for Blippo+ to be an advertising tool for the Playdate system as the Playdate can be seen in various channels but this was denied.

The Blippo+ logo is a nod to the postmodern design that permeates the Blippo+ world—it has two references to the history of computing and infographic display: the curve of the letter L mirrors the smiling profile of the original macintosh finder icon, and the shape of the lower-case i is the universally-recognized symbol for "information". The Electronic Program Guide was inspired by the history of television scrolling guide channels, dating back to 1981. Some of the shows on Blippo+ were inspired by the following: Cheers, Doctor Who, Star Trek, Talk Soup, Dick Cavett, Leta Powell Drake, MTV, Walter Cronkite, NHK World, The Twilight Zone, the Jerry Lewis Telethon, Max Headroom, Regis and Kathie Lee, Antiques Roadshow, and the Psychic Friends Network. Femtofax was inspired by the BBC's Ceefax service, the world's first teletext information service. The ZEST Channel was inspired by tantalizingly encoded premium cable channels that were common on TV in the late 1970s to early 2000s.

On May 29, 2025, the Playdate version of Blippo+ was released as a surprise bonus to the Playdate Season 2 bundle pack which contained 12 other games.

On September 23rd, 2025, the Windows version of Blippo+ was released on Steam and Itch.io, and the Nintendo Switch version was released on the Nintendo eShop.

On January 26th, 2026, the macOS version of Blippo+ was released on Steam and the Mac App Store.

== Reception ==
The game received a positive review from Engadget for its unique style of being "more like an old episode of The Twilight Zone if it were made by Tim & Eric and aired after midnight on Adult Swim". GameSpot gives the game a 7 out of 10 for its amusingly bizarre recreation of channel-surfing in a bygone decade but criticized it for the shows all tending to have a singular vibe despite the many genres attempted. Writing for Inverse, Robin Bea praised the programming and overall narrative and called Blippo+ a "storytelling feat". Writing for PC Gamer, Joshua Wolens noted that Blippo+ was less of a game and more like interactive art, but praised the authenticity of the programming to 1980s and 1990s television, as well as its take on a Ceefax-like system.
