= I Believe in You. Your Magic Is Real. =

Studio album by Yacht
- Released: May 17, 2007
- Recorded: 2004–2006
- Genre: Alternative, electronic, indie pop
- Length: 40:58
- Label: Marriage Records
- Producer: Jona Bechtolt

Yacht chronology
Mega (2004)	I Believe in You. Your Magic Is Real. (2007)	See Mystery Lights (2009)

I Believe in You. Your Magic Is Real. is an album released by YACHT on Marriage Records in 2007. To promote the album, frontman Jona Bechtolt performed a live show on a yacht.

== Background ==
While he recorded I Believe in You. Your Magic Is Real., Jona Bechtolt was also working with Khaela Maricich in the band The Blow. I Believe in You. Your Magic Is Real. is his third solo album. The album is the first by YACHT to feature appearances from musician Claire L. Evans, who would become a full member of the band following its release. The album was recorded between 2004 and 2006.

== Style ==
In general, the album is underscored with themes of positivity and magic. One exception to this trend is "It's Coming to Get You", which, according to Bechtolt, was inspired by a negative personal experience. That song explores karma; Bechtolt has stated that he "wanted to focus on it being okay for bad things to happen to people if those are things that are coming back and biting them in the ass". He sang the lyrics over upbeat "dance" instrumentation to make the track more accessible.

== Reception ==
Professional ratings
Review scores
Source	Rating
AllMusic	3.5/5 stars
Pitchfork Media	6.8/10

I Believe in You. Your Magic Is Real. received mixed reviews from critics. In a review for Allmusic, Jason Lymangrover discusses the distinction between the album and Jona Bechtolt's primary project at the time, The Blow. Lymangrover added that the unprofessional vocals gave the album an endearing whimsical nature, while sparse arrangements provided an experimental background. Lymangrover deemed the album an interesting side project, but not distinct enough from The Blow's work to be outstanding. Rob Mitchum, reviewing for Pitchfork Media, called the album a step forward from Bechtolt's previous solo albums. He praised the album's charisma and childishness. Mitchum concluded that "YACHT may not be the innovative and distinctive force that Max Tundra proved himself to be, but as a willing disciple, he's wise enough to harvest in Tundra's fertile territory".

== Track listing ==
All tracks are written by Jona Bechtolt, except where noted.

No.	Title	Length
1.	"So Post All 'Em"	3:42
2.	"See a Penny (Pick It Up)"	3:41
3.	"We're Always Waiting""	3:02
4.	"Platinum" (featuring Bobby Birdman)	3:11
5.	"It's All the Same Price" (featuring Eats Tapes)	4:56
6.	"The Magic Beat"	4:11
7.	"Drawing in the Dark"	1:58
8.	"It's Coming to Get You"	2:58
9.	"If Music Could Cure All That Ails You"	4:26
10.	"I Believe in You"	3:04
11.	"Your Magic Is Real"	3:08
12.	"Women of the World" (Ivor Cutler)	2:42

== Personnel ==
YACHT

- Jona Bechtolt – songwriting, vocals, guitar, bass guitar, drums, percussion, synthesizers

Additional musicians

- Bobby Birdman – additional songwriting, vocals
- Ivor Cutler – songwriting (track 12)
- Eats Tapes – drum machine
- Claire Evans – vocals
- Adam Forkner – additional bass
- Steve Schroeder – additional vocals
- David Shrigley – additional songwriting

Production

- Jona Bechtolt – producer, art director
