= Party at the NSA =

- The logo was designed by New York-based illustrator Tim Lahan.

Single by Yacht
- Released: August 15, 2013 (United States)
- Genre: Alternative rock, dance-punk, electropop, protest song, synthpop
- Length: 3:30
- Songwriter(s): Jona Bechtolt; Claire L. Evans
- Producer(s): Jona Bechtolt; Claire L. Evans

Music video
- "Party at the NSA" on YouTube

"Party at the NSA" is a protest song and charity single originally recorded by electropop music group Yacht released on August 15, 2013. It was written, recorded, and produced by Jona Bechtolt and Claire L. Evans. Inspired by the 2013 global surveillance disclosures, proceeds from the single benefit the international non-profit digital rights group Electronic Frontier Foundation.

Stand-up comedian and podcast host Marc Maron contributed a guitar solo to the song.

== Release ==
"Party at the NSA" was released on August 15, 2013, as a direct download link on partyatthensa.com with a pay what you want option and the statement:

We live much of our lives online; we should be outraged by the extent of the NSA's domestic spying programs. Instead, we are sinking into a dangerous indifference. Insidious forces are at work. Help us reverse the entropy. The Electronic Frontier Foundation is a donation-supported nonprofit that fights back against the government to protect our digital rights; 100% of your donation to download "Party at the NSA" will go straight to fund their important work.

The website made for the song uses a special font designed by a former National Security Agency contractor that is supposedly unreadable by optical character recognition software.

== Reception ==
Professional ratings
Review scores
| Source | Rating |
|---|---|
| Rolling Stone | 3.5/5 stars |

"Party at the NSA" received positive reviews. Internet forum Big Think's Nicholas Clairmont found it a "fun yet serious protest song" that "features an upbeat tone and bitter lyrics criticizing the widespread domestic surveillance being done by the NSA's PRISM program, among others." Music blog BrooklynVegan reviewed it as in "early B-52s-style new wave format". Media company CMJ's Brooke Segarra reviewed the song as "a high-gear dance number that has caffeine in its bass drum and a vendetta against government spying. The quirky urgency, oscillating synth, and forewarnings about the U.S. surveillance state makes the track sound like a musical rendition of some estranged cyberpunk novel." IFC's Melissa Locker noted that Marc Maron plays a "mean guitar".

Brian Merchant of Vice's Motherboard reviewed "Party at the NSA" as a "fantastically goofball paranoid dance jam" as well as "a catchy, new wavy dance tune with, you know, satirically topical lyrics." Rolling Stone's Christian Hoard called it a "lefty satire you can dance to: a deadpan-catchy shot at the surveillance state, complete with references to PRISM, whistle-blowing and the NSA data-gathering center in Utah." Spin's Chris Martins reviewed the song as "[a] punk-addled dance-ripper [that] takes aim at the U.S. government's controversial information gathering techniques." Stereogum's Tom Breihan said it was "a lightweight new-wave jam about the surveillance state, which puts it firmly in the '99 Luftballoons' tradition of lightweight new-wave jams about heavy issues." The Stranger's Dave Segal said it "sounds like Devo and the B-52s taking liberties with Elvis Costello's 'Pump It Up.' In other words, it's an infeasibly upbeat, new-wave dance jam for such a dark subject."

== Personnel ==
Yacht

- Jona Bechtolt
- Claire L. Evans

Additional musicians

- Rob Kieswetter – bass guitar
- Marc Maron – guitar solo

Production

- Timothy Stollenwerk – audio mastering
- Tim Lahan – artwork

== See also ==
- Protest songs in the United States
