= See Mystery Lights =

Studio album by Yacht
- Released: July 28, 2009
- Recorded: 2007–2008
- Genre: Indie pop; electropop
- Label: DFA
- Producer: Yacht

Yacht chronology
| I Believe in You. Your Magic Is Real. (2007) | See Mystery Lights (2009) | Shangri-La (2011) |

See Mystery Lights is the fourth full-length studio album by American musical band Yacht. It was released on July 28, 2009, via DFA Records. Recording sessions took place in Portland, Oregon and Marfa, Texas in 2007 and 2008. Production was handled by Yacht.

The album marks the band's first released to feature its eventual frontwoman Claire L. Evans as a full-time member. The album's cover art was designed by Boyd Elder.

== Critical reception ==
Professional ratings
Aggregate scores
| Source | Rating |
|---|---|
| Metacritic | 70/100 |
Review scores
| Source | Rating |
| AllMusic | 3.5/5 stars |
| Drowned in Sound | 7/10 |
| musicOMH | 3.5/5 stars |
| Now | 2/5 Ns |
| Pitchfork | 8.5/10 |
| PopMatters | 6/10 |
| Prefix | 7.5/10 |
| Rolling Stone | 3.5/5 stars |
| The A.V. Club | B |
| The Guardian | 4/5 stars |

See Mystery Lights was met with generally favourable reviews from music critics. At Metacritic, which assigns a normalized rating out of 100 to reviews from mainstream publications, the album received an average score of 70, based on twenty-five reviews.

Accolades for See Mystery Lights
| Publication | Accolade | Rank | Ref. |
|---|---|---|---|
| CLASH | Top 40 Albums of 2009 | 12 | |

== Track listing ==
| No. | Title | Length |
|---|---|---|
| 1. | "Ring the Bell" | 4:23 |
| 2. | "The Afterlife" | 4:58 |
| 3. | "I'm in Love with a Ripper" | 4:13 |
| 4. | "It's Boring / You Can Live Anywhere You Want" | 8:52 |
| 5. | "Psychic City (Voodoo City)" | 5:07 |
| 6. | "Summer Song" | 3:32 |
| 7. | "We Have All We've Ever Wanted" | 4:11 |
| 8. | "Don't Fight the Darkness" | 3:08 |
| 9. | "I'm in Love with a Ripper" (Party Mix) | 5:16 |
| 10. | "Psychic City" (Version) | 1:32 |

== Personnel ==
- Jona Bechtolt — songwriter, producer, recording, mixing, artwork
- Claire L. Evans — songwriter, art direction
- Rich Jensen — songwriter (tracks: 5, 10)
- Steve Schroeder — additional vocals (tracks: 1, 7)
- Jherek Bischoff — strings (tracks: 3, 9)
- Adam Forkner — additional guitar (tracks: 3, 9), additional mixing
- Alex Marks — additional vocals (track 4)
- Anthony Desimone — additional vocals (track 4)
- Chase Lindley — additional vocals (track 4)
- Lauren Klotzman — additional vocals (track 4)
- Rachel Lindley — additional vocals (track 4)
- Rebecca Carlisle-Healy — additional vocals (track 7)
- Simon Davey — mastering
- Boyd Elder — cover art

== Charts ==
| Chart (2009) | Peak position |
|---|---|
| US Top Dance Albums (Billboard) | 10 |
| US Heatseekers Albums (Billboard) | 17 |
