= VVRSSNN =

Studio album by VVRSSNN
- Released: 2003
- Recorded: 2002
- Genre: Indie
- Length: 45:45
- Label: K Records
- Producer: Adam Forkner

VVRSSNN (pronounced "Version"), released on K Records in 2003, is the only full-length album made by musician Adam Forkner under the band name VVRSSNN. Soon after the release of VVRSSNN, Forkner permanently changed the name of his solo project to White Rainbow.

== Content ==
While it was promoted as Forkner's debut solo outing, the album features many collaborations with other artists. Opening track "Double Dragons" features vocals by Dave Longstreth and synthesizers by Franz Prichard of Yume Bitsu. "Bruise Blood" feature vocals by Bobby Birdman. "Come Out (K-Hole Version)" features Jeremiah Green and Eric Judy of Modest Mouse on drums and bass, as well as Phil Elverum (of The Microphones/Mount Eerie) on various horns, and Calvin Johnson on various sounds. "Blankets Made Of Snow" is a remix of a song by Y.A.C.H.T. which appeared in its original form under a different name on Y.A.C.H.T.'s debut album Super Warren MMIV in 2004. The song "Guilded Golden Ladies" is an early version of a track that appears on the White Rainbow album ZOME. Track titles like "Comeouttoshowdem", "Bruise Blood", and "Come Out" all reference the early tape-phasing compositions Come Out by minimalist composer Steve Reich.

== Track listing ==
1. "Double Dragons (Version DLO Version)" - 3:12
2. "Comeouttoshowdem" - 2:49
3. "Bruise Blood" - 3:44
4. "I Want To Warm You (I Need To Warn You)" - 1:48
5. "Come Out (K-Hole Version)" - 7:08
6. "Invisible Wavez" - 2:57
7. "Surface III (Hardcore Version)" - 5:36
8. "Guilded Golden Ladies" - 1:34
9. "Blankets Made Of Snow" - 6:14
10. "Shield Of Invisibility" - 2:23
11. "Whispers In The Waiting" - 8:25
