= Poor Aim: Love Songs =

EP by The Blow
- Released: November 2, 2004; re-released April 24, 2007
- Label: States Rights Records/Slender Means Society; re-release K Records
- Producer: The Blow

The Blow chronology
Paper Television (2006)	Poor Aim: Love Songs (2004)

Poor Aim: Love Songs is an EP by The Blow originally released in 2004 by States Rights Records/Slender Means Society. It was re-released in 2007 by K Records with remixed bonus tracks.

== Reception ==
Professional ratings
Review scores
Source	Rating
Allmusic	3.5/5 stars
Pitchfork Media	(8.0/10)

Exclaim! gave the album a positive review, calling it "Nintendo music intended for dancing, or folk singer songs remixed by an electro pop-loving hipster." They especially praised the final track on the re-release, "We Are Over Here".

== Track listing ==
1. "Hey Boy"
2. "The Sky Opened Wide Like the Tide"
3. "Knowing the Things That I Know"
4. "Let's Play Boys Chase Girls"
5. "The Love That I Crave"
6. "Hock It"
7. "Come on Petunia"

All tracks were written by Jona Bechtolt and Khaela Maricich, except "The Sky Opened Wide Like the Tide", which was written by Bechtolt, Maricich, and Anna Oxygen. The refrain and part of the lyric from "Come on Petunia" was taken from "Every Little Thing She Does Is Magic", a song written by Sting of The Police.
