= Skulls Example =

Studio album by Dear Nora
- Released: May 25, 2018
- Recorded: Summer and autumn 2017
- Genre: Indie folk; indie pop; indie rock
- Length: 36:16
- Label: Orindal Records
- Producer: Katy Davidson

Dear Nora chronology
There Is No Home (2006)	Skulls Example (2018)

Skulls Example is the fourth studio album by indie folk band Dear Nora. Released May 25, 2018, Skulls Example is Dear Nora's first new album in 12 years.

== Background ==
Dear Nora, a musical project of songwriter Katy Davidson, initially formed in 1999 as a trio. Dear Nora released three albums—We'll Have a Time (2001), Mountain Rock (2004), and There Is No Home (2006)—before Davidson discontinued the project in 2008. After Dear Nora, Davidson released music under the names Lloyd & Michael and Key Losers, worked as a session guitarist for the bands Gossip and YACHT, and took a job with the music agency Marmoset as a commercial music producer.

In 2017, Orindal Records reissued Mountain Rock and Davidson embarked on a new Dear Nora tour, recruiting musicians Zach Burba, Gregory Campanile, and Stephen Steinbrink. Davidson told The Fader that the new tour inspired them to record a backlog of their new unreleased songs, saying "I felt like, I need to do this, I have these songs, they're ready, I need to release them! I need to get them out! I want to play! Touring in support of Mountain Rock was a kick in the pants." Davidson's earlier decision to stop using the name "Dear Nora" was a conscious choice to shift away from their early musical style; telling Stereogum that they chose to revive the band name after receiving encouragement from their friend Casey Jarman, a music journalist, and because:

I think the main thing for me was that I was getting ready to start sharing music again and wanting to perform and wanting to record and release things, and I think ultimately what it came down to was that enough time had passed and I had separated from all my other judgements about using that band name from before. Now, I was thinking about how I could reach the most people, and I think that the most people know this name. Even if my new music doesn't sound exactly like that old stuff, who cares? If we're gonna do this, let's just reach the most people.

== Release ==
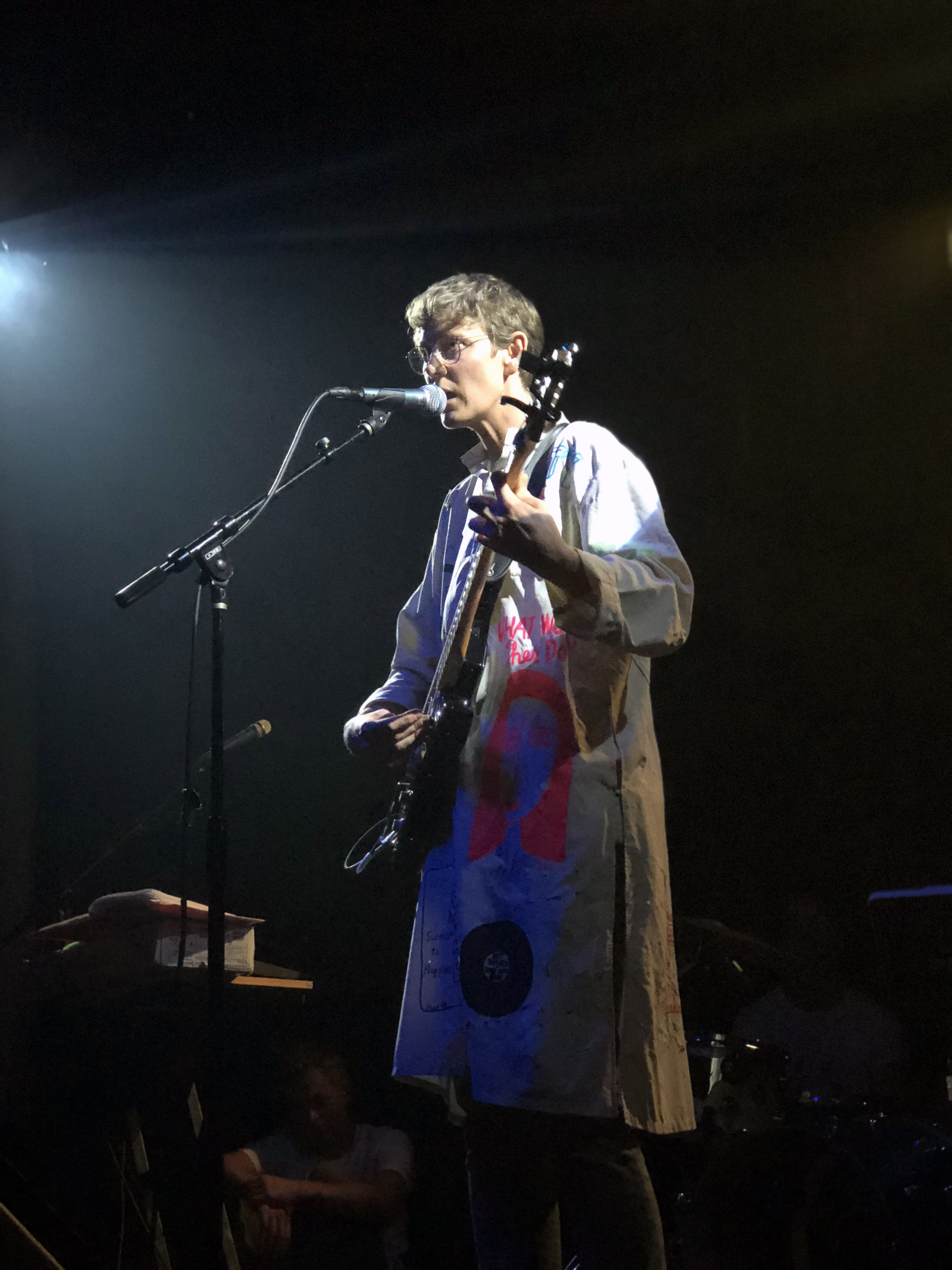
Katy Davidson performing with Dear Nora in Oakland, California in May 2018, on tour promoting Skulls Example

Dear Nora debuted the songs "Sunset on Humanity", "White Fur", and "Simulation Feels" as streaming singles in the month prior to the album's release. Skulls Example was released by Orindal Records on May 25, 2018 in a limited edition of 600 LP records. On the album's release date, Dear Nora played a show in Portland, Oregon and embarked on a tour with shows in Washington, California, Arizona, Massachusetts, New York, and Pennsylvania, accompanied by Nicholas Krgovich, Stephen Steinbrink, and Hand Habits as opening acts.

== Reception ==
Professional ratings
Aggregate scores
Source	Rating
Album of the Year	75
Review scores
Source	Rating
Exclaim!	7/10
Pitchfork	7.5/10
The Independent	4/5 stars
Stereoboard	4/5 stars

Skulls Example received generally favorable reviews, with an aggregate score of 75 out of 100 from the website Album of the Year. Writing for Exclaim!, Jenna Mohammed called the album an "engaging and mesmerizing listen" and said "[m]any tracks on Skulls Example have a feel-good vibe initially, but when you listen closely, Davidson has arranged lyrically engaging songs that suggest that not everything is as it seems." Ilana Kaplan at The Independent noted the album's anti-capitalist lyrics and remarked that "Davidson aptly and gorgeously narrates the need for love in a world that has been set on fire." In a positive review at Pitchfork, Jay Balfour compared the album to "a Mexican travelogue filled with philosophical poetry about the natural world. Davidson favors surprising juxtapositions, images of transformation, and snapshots that highlight the absurdity of scenes, places, and contemporary existence in general, often considering the ancient and timeless within the same songs that capture the technology-driven frenzy of 2018."

In a review published in the alt-weekly newspapers The Portland Mercury and The Stranger, Ciara Dolan wrote that Skulls Example features the "classic Dear Nora building blocks of jangly, reverbed guitar riffs, layered harmonies, and observational lyrics that painstakingly catalog details of the natural world," but with a new lyrical focus on "the modern age's regimented grids and simulated realities." According to Dolan, Skulls Example is less similar to the "straightforward indie folk" of Mountain Rock than it is to the band's followup There Is No Home, only with "tighter melodies and more focused themes"; she concluded that the album's high points "prove Davidson's songwriting hasn't lost the gentle power of Dear Nora's earlier releases—the scope is just broader now, the view a little clearer." Andrew Sacher at indie music blog BrooklynVegan noted Skulls Example was released just as Dear Nora was gaining "increased acclaim" and "acknowledge[ment] as an artist ahead of their time," yet the album is "not just a victory lap to remind people of their classic material," but "a clear shift in direction." Calling it the band's "most cleaned-up, poppy album" to date, Sacher believed the album's sound would please loyal and new fans alike and wrote "[t]ons of indie bands have reunited to put a cherry on top of their legacy in recent years, but few seem primed to create an entirely new legacy the way Dear Nora does."

Martin Douglas of the Seattle public radio station KEXP-FM praised the album's diverse sonic influences and lyrical sophistication, writing that the lyrics are "so bustling with detail, it would take a book club rather than this column to parse the album's lyrics out substantially." Naming "Sunset on Humanity" as a highlight of the album, Douglas wrote that the song "brilliantly encompasses the themes of Skulls Example and the merits of Dear Nora as a whole — critical but warm, poetically observant, simultaneously hilarious, discouraging, and hopeful in a long shot sort of way." At the Cardiff, Wales-based music site Stereoboard, Liam Turner opened his review by asking: "Did Katy Davidson need to bring back Dear Nora?" Turner decided Dear Nora was "worth reviving, after all," calling the album their "most cohesive, coherent and accomplished record yet," but he also said that the album's shorter songs can feel undeveloped while the longer songs—particularly "Antidote for Mindlessness" and "Skulls Example"—are the ones that "truly soar[]."

== Track listing ==
All tracks are written by Katy Davidson, except where noted

No.	Title	Lyrics	Length
1.	"White Fur"	Davidson and Cynthia Nelson	2:39
2.	"Morning Glories"	From the public domain song "Where the Morning Glories Grow"	2:45
3.	"New to Me"		1:42
4.	"Simulation Feels"		2:08
5.	"Sunset on Humanity"	Davidson and Franz Prichard	2:39
6.	"Anyway"		2:22
7.	"Skulls Example" (Davidson and Zach Burba)		4:49
8.	"Worship the Cactus"		2:06
9.	"Antidote for Mindlessness"	Davidson and Nelson	3:45
10.	"Black Truck"		1:45
11.	"Creature of Habit"		2:29
12.	"Ancient Plain"		3:37
13.	"Long Distance"		2:14
14.	"Walking in the Hills"		1:16
Total length:			36:16

== Personnel ==
- Dear Nora

- Katy Davidson – producer, engineer, vocals, guitar, synth, other photos
- Zach Burba – bass, synth, guitar, percussion, vocals (track 12)
- Tom Filardo – guitar
- Greg Campanile – drums, drum programming (track 9)
- Jessica Jones – guitar, album design
- Chris Sutton – bass
- Jessica Dennison – Casio (track 11)
- David Longstreth – vocals (track 12)

- Tim Shrout – mixing
- Matthew Barnhart – mastering
- Andrea Zittel – cover photo
