= Dear Nora =

American indie pop band

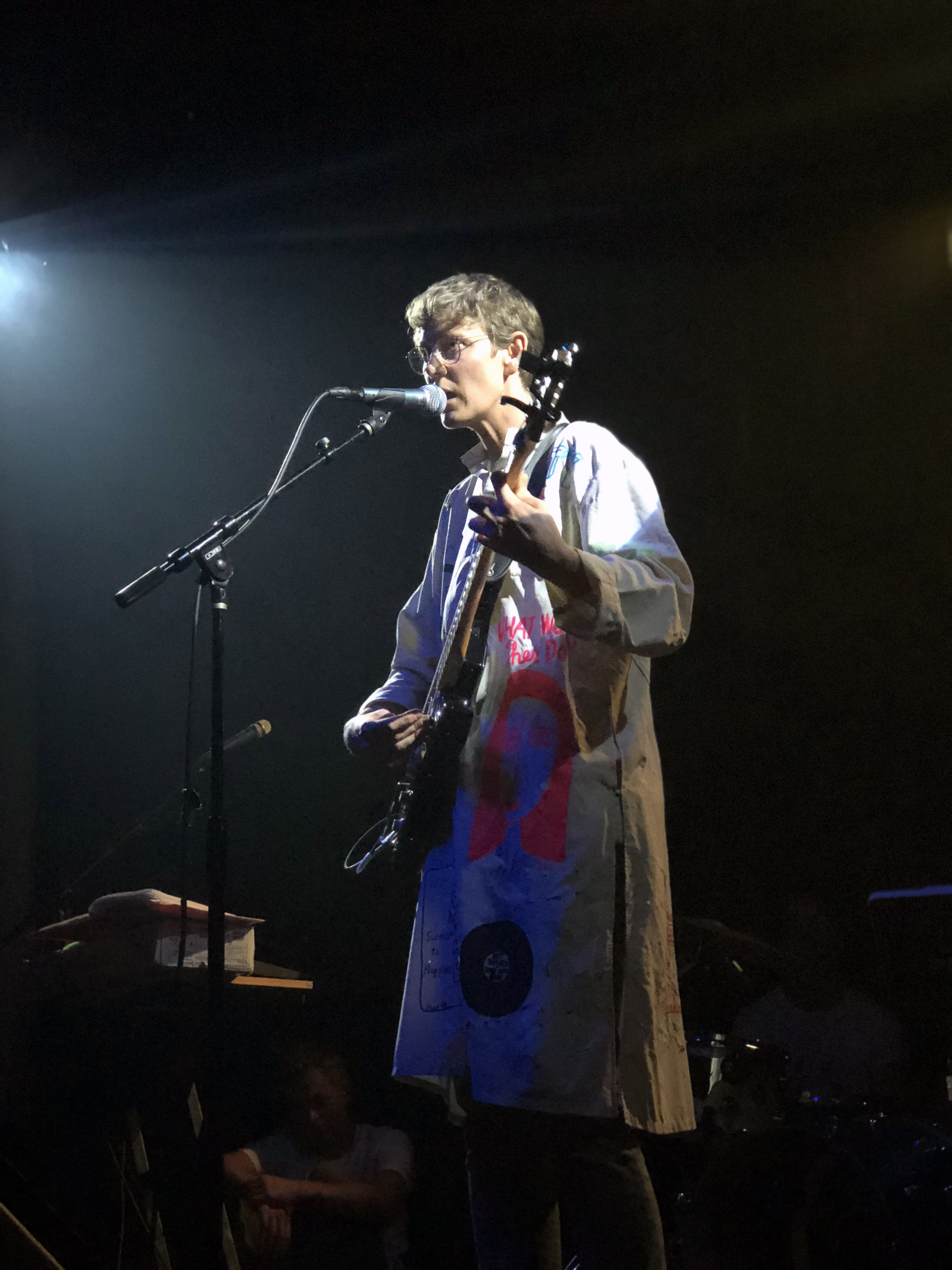
- Katy Davidson performing with Dear Nora in 2018.

Background information
- Origin: Portland, Oregon
- Genres: Indie rock, folk rock, indie pop, twee pop (early)
- Years active: 1997–2008, 2017–present
- Labels: Magic Marker, States Rights Records, Valve Records, Orindal Records
- Members: Katy Davidson
- Past members: Gretchen Hildebran; Jaime Knight; Jake Longstreth; Marianna Ritchey; Nora Roman; Antonio Roman-Alcalá; Ryan Wise
- Website: Katy Davidson and Friends

Dear Nora is an indie pop/rock band formed in Portland, Oregon in 1999 by songwriter, vocalist, and guitarist Katy Davidson, drummer and vocalist Marianna Ritchey, and bassist Ryan Wise.

Pitchfork conferred the title of "your favorite indie rocker’s favorite indie rocker" on Davidson.

== History ==
Ritchey and Wise were previously members of Wolf Colonel. They named their new band after Lewis & Clark College music professor Aaron Beck. Dear Nora's first album, We'll Have a Time, was produced by Amy Linton of The Aislers Set and released on the Portland label Magic Marker Records in 2001.

After moving to San Francisco, Davidson continued to record under the name Dear Nora with a rotating cast of band members. The band released two more main albums, Mountain Rock (2004) and There Is No Home (2006), as well as several 7" singles and EPs. From 2004 to 2007, they performed locally in San Francisco and toured with musicians such as The Blow, Mirah, and YACHT.

After a tour of Florida with Casiotone for the Painfully Alone in 2008, Davidson retired the name Dear Nora, though they continue to record music. In 2006, Davidson moved to Los Angeles, where they and Ritchey recorded Just as God Made Us under the name Lloyd & Michael on States Rights Records. Davidson now resides in Portland and performs under the name "Key Losers."

In 2017, after a vinyl reissue of 'Mountain Rock', Katy Davidson reached out to several fellow musicians, Zach Burba, Gregory Campanile, and Stephen Steinbrink to play with them under the Dear Nora moniker, for the first time since 2008, on tour across the United States.

In May, 2018, Dear Nora released their fourth album Skulls Example on Orindal Records.

In October, 2022, Dear Nora released human futures on Orindal Records.

== Musical style ==
Dear Nora's early material was twee pop and cuddlecore in the vein of Cub, Heavenly and All Girl Summer Fun Band. Their later material is considered to be more mellow in timbre and instrumentation. AllMusic said the band represents "the folkier side of indie rock".

== Personal life ==
Davidson uses they/them as pronouns.

== Discography ==
- 2000 - Make You Smile (7"), Magic Marker Records
- 2000 - Dreaming Out Loud (7"), Magic Marker Records
- 2001 - We'll Have a Time, Magic Marker Records
- 2002 - The New Year, Magic Marker Records
- 2003 - split w/ Mates of State (7"), Polyvinyl Records
- 2004 - Mountain Rock, Magic Marker Records
- 2005 - split w/ What the Kids Want (7"), Shake Got the Beets Records
- 2006 - There is No Home, Magic Marker Records
- 2008 - Three States: Rarities 1997-2007, Magic Marker Records
- 2018 - Skulls Example, Orindal Records
- 2022 - human futures, Orindal Records
