= Broad Band =

2018 book by Claire Evans

Broad Band: The Untold Story of the Women Who Made the Internet
- Author: Claire L. Evans
- Subject: Women in science
- Genre: Nonfiction
- Publisher: Penguin Putnam Inc.
- Publication date: 2018
- ISBN: 9780735211759
- Website: https://clairelevans.com/

Broad Band: The Untold Story of the Women Who Made the Internet is a nonfiction book by American writer Claire L. Evans published in 2018 by Penguin Putnam Inc. The magazine Inc. named it one of the ten top business books of 2018.

== Summary ==
Broad Band explores the development of the Internet through contributions made by women. Evans said in an interview, "Broad Band itself came out of a series of articles that I wrote for Motherboard a few years ago about cyberfeminism."

The book begins with the first use of the word computer in print, an 1892 classified ad in The New York Times for a job at the United States Naval Observatory, and then describes the accomplishments of Maria Mitchell, the sole woman computer for the observatory's Nautical Almanac Office. By the turn of the century, being a computer was considered women's work.

The book's first in-depth examination is of Ada Lovelace's work on Charles Babbage's proposed mechanical general-purpose computer, the Analytical Engine. Next it tells the stories of computer scientist Grace Hopper and the six original programmers of the ENIAC: Kathleen Antonelli, Jean Bartik, Betty Holberton, Marlyn Meltzer, Frances Spence, and Ruth Teitelbaum.

Continuing the evolution of the internet through the twentieth century and into the twenty-first, the book introduces:

- Pamela Hardt-English, Jude Milhon, and the impact of Resource One with its Social Services Referral Directory
- Jake Feinler and the early days of ARPANET
- Radia Perlman and her Spanning Tree Protocol
- Stacy Horn and EchoNYC, a New York-based bulletin board system influenced by The WELL
- Wendy Hall, Cathy Marshall, and hypertext systems
- Marisa Bowe, Jaime Levy, and electronic publishing
- Nancy Rhine, Ellen Pack, Marleen McDaniel, and Women's WIRE
- Brenda Laurel and computer gaming

The book concludes with a discussion of VNS Matrix and cyberfeminism.

== Reception ==
In The New York Times, Dava Sobel wrote that Broad Band and similar books "provide much needed perspective, along with presumed-absent foremothers and role models". Katherine Boyle in the Wall Street Journal says "While Broad Band excels as a collection of brief lives, it struggles as a work of social history and criticism." Booklist praises it as a "fascinating and inspiring work of women's history".

Kirkus Reviews says Broad Band is "An edifying and entertaining history of the rise of the computer age and the women who made it possible". The review in Publishers Weekly describes it as "an invigorating history of female coders, engineers, entrepreneurs, and visionaries who helped create and shape the internet".

== See also ==
- Harvard Computers
- Hidden Figures
- Women in computing
