= Suicide of Evelyn McHale =

American bookkeeper and suicide victim (1923–1947)

Evelyn McHale
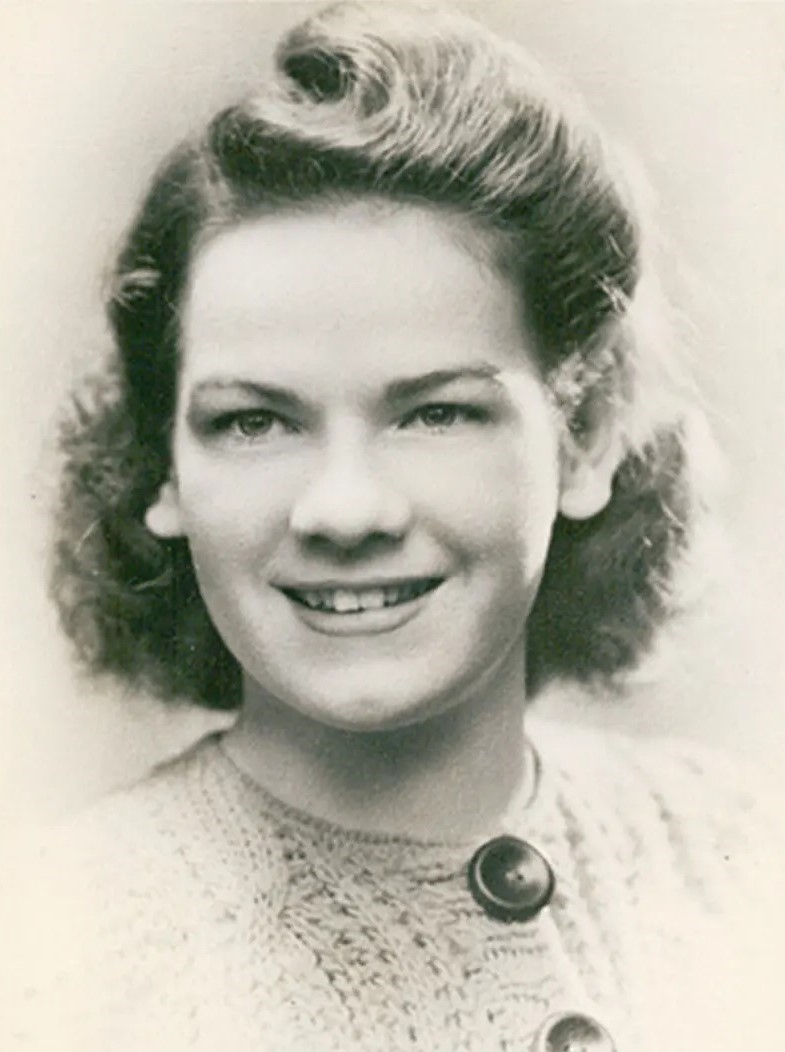
- McHale's 1942 high school graduation photograph
- Born: Evelyn Frances McHale; September 20, 1923; Berkeley, California, U.S.
- Died: May 1, 1947 (aged 23); Manhattan, New York City, U.S.
- Cause of death: Suicide by jumping
- Resting place: Cremated
- Occupations: Bookkeeper, US Army Corps

Evelyn Frances McHale (September 20, 1923 – May 1, 1947) was an American bookkeeper who jumped to her death from the 86th-floor observation deck of the Empire State Building. Robert Wiles, a photography student, took a picture of her corpse where it lay on top of a crushed car. The photograph was republished around the world and led Time magazine to call it "the most beautiful suicide". It inspired Andy Warhol, among other artists.

== Early life and education ==
Evelyn McHale was born in Berkeley, California, one of nine children born to Helen and Vincent McHale. Her father was a bank examiner who relocated to Washington, D.C., in 1930. Her mother suffered from undiagnosed and untreated depression. This led to a challenging marriage and ultimately a divorce. McHale moved to Tuckahoe, New York under the custody of her father Vincent, where she attended Eastchester High School as a junior.

== Career ==
After graduating from Normandy High School in 1942, McHale joined the Women's Army Corps and was stationed in Jefferson City, Missouri. She later moved to Baldwin, New York, and was employed as a bookkeeper at the Kitab Engraving Company on Pearl Street.

== Death ==
On April 30, 1947, McHale took a train from New York to Easton, Pennsylvania, to visit her fiancé Barry Rhodes, a Lafayette College student discharged from the United States Army Air Force. The next day, after leaving Rhodes's residence, she returned to New York City and went to the Empire State Building, where she jumped from the 86th-floor observatory, landing on top of a parked car. A security guard reportedly stood approximately 10 feet (3.0 m) from her just before she jumped.

Rhodes did not notice any indication of suicidal thoughts before McHale left. Detective Frank Murray found her suicide note in a black pocketbook next to her neatly folded cloth coat over the observation deck wall. The note read:

I don't want anyone in or out of my family to see any part of me. Could you destroy my body by cremation? I beg of you and my family – don't have any service for me or remembrance for me. My fiance asked me to marry him in June. I don't think I would make a good wife for anybody. He is much better off without me. Tell my father, I have too many of my mother's tendencies.

Her body was identified by her sister, Helen Brenner. In accordance with her wishes, McHale was cremated with no memorial, service, or grave.

Barry Rhodes became an engineer before moving south. He married Adelaide Marie Haas in Garden City, New York on June 23rd, 1950. He died in Melbourne, Florida, on October 9, 2007.

== Legacy ==
The Most Beautiful Suicide
- Artist: Robert Wiles
- Completion date: 1947
- Medium: Photograph
- Subject: Suicide
- Location: New York City, New York, U.S.

The photo of her body, taken by Robert Wiles, was published in Life magazine. Ben Cosgrove of Time praised the photo as "technically rich, visually compelling and ... downright beautiful", describing her body as "resting, or napping, rather than ... dead" and appearing as if she is "daydreaming of her beau".

== In popular culture ==
Andy Warhol used Wiles' photo in one of his prints entitled Suicide (Fallen Body).

Her picture was also used on the cover of Saccharine Trust's album Surviving You, Always, released in 1984 by SST Records.

Lethal Weapon references this picture in the opening sequence.

David Bowie's 1993 video for the single "Jump They Say" and Radiohead's 1995 music video for the single "Street Spirit (Fade Out)" both include a recreation of the image, with Bowie and Thom Yorke respectively splayed atop a smashed car.

The cover of the 1995 album Gilt by the Tucson band Machines of Loving Grace uses a color photo that recreates the original image, while that of the 2009 Pearl Jam album Backspacer features an artist rendition of the iconic photograph in the bottom right corner.

On the cover of the 2019 album Better Out Than In by the St. Paul, Minnesota band Skittish, singer and songwriter Jeff Noller poses in a stylized recreation of the infamous picture.

The photograph is referenced in the movie Stranger Than Fiction by the character Karen Eiffel. The photograph is also referenced in the song "Shatter Me with Hope" by HIM from their album Screamworks: Love in Theory and Practice, with the lyrics "Turn to page 43, and you'll know how I feel", being in direct reference to the photograph as shown in LIFE Magazine's May 12, 1947 issue.

Parenthetical Girls' 2013 release Privilege (Abridged) opens with the track "Evelyn McHale". A reference was also made to the shot at the start of Taylor Swift's "Bad Blood" music video, released in 2015.

The 2022 music video for the Cyberpunk: Edgerunners ending theme song "Let You Down" by Dawid Podsiadło contains a visual homage to the Evelyn McHale photo, with a character's body being depicted atop a car in a pose reminiscent of McHale's.

In 2018, a novel by journalist and writer Nadia Busato was published in Italy, tracing the story of Evelyn McHale and her suicide. The novel is entitled Non sarò mai la brava moglie di nessuno (I will never be anyone's good wife).

== See also ==
- The Falling Man
- Thích Quảng Đức
