= I Thought the Future Would Be Cooler =

Studio album by Yacht
- Released: October 16, 2015
- Genre: Indietronica; synth-pop; dance-punk
- Length: 46:25
- Label: Downtown
- Producer: Bobby Birdman; Jona Bechtolt; Jacknife Lee

Yacht chronology
Shangri-La (2011)	I Thought the Future Would Be Cooler (2015)	Chain Tripping (2019)

I Thought the Future Would Be Cooler is the sixth studio album by American musical band Yacht. It was released on October 16, 2015 via Downtown Records. Production was handled by Jona Bechtolt, Bobby Birdman and Jacknife Lee, with Justin Meldal-Johnsen co-produced one song.

== Critical reception ==
Professional ratings
Aggregate scores
Source	Rating
Metacritic	66/100
Review scores
Source	Rating
AllMusic	4/5 stars
Clash	6/10
Consequence of Sound	B
Drowned in Sound	5/10
Exclaim!	7/10
Pitchfork	5/10
PopMatters	8/10
Rolling Stone	3/5 stars
Uncut	7/10
Under the Radar	6.5/10 stars

I Thought the Future Would Be Cooler was met with generally favourable reviews from music critics. At Metacritic, which assigns a normalized rating out of 100 to reviews from mainstream publications, the album received an average score of 66, based on twelve reviews.

AllMusic's Tim Sendra wrote: "people looking for a bit more substance from a band that once made concept albums and instituted its own Belief System might wonder what the heck is going on, but anyone who loves pop music that moves feet, brings smiles, and snaps like bubblegum, and who is also deathly tired of the mainstream, will think I Thought the Future Would Be Cooler is just about the coolest thing around". Brice Ezell of PopMatters praised the album, saying: "future finds YACHT alive in a whole new way, with the group crafting not only some of the best pop of their careers, but of 2015 as a whole". Sasha Geffen of Consequence of Sound found "YACHT balances its snark with just enough warmth to keep its dystopian dreams engaging". Calum Slingerland of Exclaim! wrote: "preventing such weighty topics from becoming too exhausting are the upbeat instrumentals with which they've been paired". Nigel Williamson of Uncut stated that "their defining touchstones remain intact". Alee Karim of Under the Radar wrote: "it's a slower burn to catch YACHT's fire. I Thought the Future Would Be Cooler often demands a more careful listen to perceive riches inside those aforementioned innocuous interfaces".

In mixed reviews, Mat Smith of Clash wrote: "YACHT have consciously positioned themselves as intelligent conceptualists, not wanting to adhere to what's expected of them, and that makes for an interesting amalgam of deep themes set to brazenly outlandish pop styles". Jon Dolan of Rolling Stone resumed: "their sixth album is steeped in sci-fi parody". Luke Beardsworth of Drowned in Sound claimed: "the tracks themselves work if you can get past the contrast. That might even be what makes you love it rather than hate it. The problem is that if you're going to have a deep concept behind your pop tracks then it really needs to be stronger or more current than something that has gone before". Patric Fallon of Pitchfork wrote: "future is YACHT's would-be critique of our pre-dystopian, post-Internet culture, but it rarely comes off as more than a charismatic cover band singing us yesterday's news".

== Track listing ==
All tracks are written by Jona Bechtolt, Claire L. Evans and Rob Kieswetter, except track 7 written with Family Fodder.

No.	Title	Length
1.	"Miles & Miles"	8:21
2.	"White Mirror"	3:13
3.	"Matter"	3:58
4.	"Ringtone"	4:12
5.	"I Thought the Future Would Be Cooler"	3:27
6.	"L.A. Plays Itself"	3:23
7.	"I Wanna Fuck You Till I'm Dead"	3:27
8.	"Hologram"	3:44
9.	"Don't Be Rude"	4:19
10.	"War on Women"	3:14
11.	"The Entertainment"	5:07
Total length:		46:25

== Charts ==
Chart (2015)	Peak position
US Top Dance/Electronic Albums (Billboard)	9
US Heatseekers Albums (Billboard)	17
