= Love in the Dark =

Love in the Dark may refer to:

== Film ==
- Love in the Dark (film), a 1922 American silent film
- Love in the Dark, a 1985 South Korean film featuring Kim Hae-sook

== Literature ==
- Love in the Dark (play), a 1675 play by Francis Fane
- Love in the Dark, a 1979 novel by Barbara Cartland
- Love in the Dark, a 1986 novel by Charlotte Lamb
- "Love in the Dark", a short story by H. L. Gold

== Music ==
- "Love in the Dark" (song), a 2015 song by Adele
- "Love in the Dark", a song by Jessie Reyez from Before Love Came to Kill Us, 2020
- "Love in the Dark", a song by the Twins, 1985
- "Love in the Dark", a song by Yacht from Shangri-La, 2011
