= Golden Vessyl of Sound =

Studio album by Yume Bitsu
- Released: May 7, 2002
- Recorded: Fall 2001
- Studio: Radsoul and Dub Narcotic Studios (Portland, OR)
- Genre: Post-rock, psychedelic rock, shoegaze
- Length: 62:03 (CD), 83:55 (vinyl)
- Label: K

Yume Bitsu chronology
Auspicious Winds (2000)	Golden Vessyl of Sound (2002)

Professional ratings
Review scores
Source	Rating
Allmusic	3/5 stars
Pitchfork Media	(8.5/10)

Golden Vessyl of Sound is the fourth studio album by Yume Bitsu, released on May 7, 2002, through K Records.

== Track listing ==
All tracks are written by Yume Bitsu.

No.	Title	Length
1.	"[untitled]"	8:20
2.	"[untitled]"	5:35
3.	"[untitled]"	2:03
4.	"[untitled]"	6:46
5.	"[untitled]"	1:57
6.	"[untitled]"	18:13
7.	"[untitled]"	7:01
8.	"[untitled]"	4:07
9.	"[untitled]"	8:01

Vinyl version
No.	Title	Length
1.	"[untitled]"	8:20
2.	"[untitled]"	5:35
3.	"[untitled]"	2:03
4.	"[untitled]"	8:45
5.	"[untitled]"	7:09
6.	"[untitled]"	4:07
7.	"[untitled]"	18:13
8.	"[untitled]"	8:01
9.	"[untitled]"	22:40

== Personnel ==
Adapted from the Golden Vessyl of Sound liner notes.

Yume Bitsu

- Adam Forkner – vocals, guitar, engineering
- Franz Prichard – guitar

Additional musicians

- Jason Anderson – drums (1, 7), guitar (6)
- Alex Bundy – keyboards (1, 3–7), guitar (2)
- Daniel Eaton – trombone (6)
- McCloud Zicmuse – alto clarinet (6)

Production and additional personnel

- Wade Chamberlain – mastering
- Johannah Goldstein – cover art

== Release history ==
Region	Date	Label	Format	Catalog
United States	2002	K	CD, LP	KLP 137
