= Mountain Rock =

Studio album by Dear Nora
- Released: May 18, 2004 (original release); January 13, 2017 (re-issue)
- Recorded: December 2003
- Studio: Peggy Davidson's living room (Cave Creek, Arizona); Bea Rector's quonset hut (Catalina, Arizona); A kitchen in Lower Haight (San Francisco, California)
- Genre: Anti-folk; folk-pop; indie pop; lo-fi
- Length: 31:58
- Label: Magic Marker Records (2004 release); Orindal Records (2017 reissue)
- Producer: Katy Davidson

Dear Nora chronology
The New Year (2002)	Mountain Rock (00000001)	There Is No Home (2006)

Mountain Rock is the third record by Portland-formed indie pop band Dear Nora. It was originally released through Magic Marker Records in 2004. In 2017, it would receive a critically applauded reissue through Orindal.

== Composition ==
Mountain Rock has been applauded as an "overlooked anti-folk masterpiece" and an "indie pop masterpiece". It has also been called a "lo-fi folk-pop classic".

== Critical reception ==
Professional ratings
Review scores
Source	Rating
AllMusic	3/5 stars
Pitchfork	8.3/10
PopMatters	
Tiny Mix Tapes	4/5 marks

Mountain Rock has been welcomed with mostly positive reviews towards both its 2004 release and 2017 reissue. Quinn Moreland of Pitchfork called it Davidson's "most complex album". Moreland credited tracks "You Are a Bear" and "Oxygen & the Mellow Stuff" with anticipating indie pop musician Frankie Cosmos and the "charmed beltings" of indie rock duo Girlpool.

== Track listing ==
Mountain Rock track listing
No.	Title	Length
1.	"The Lonesome Border, Pt. 1"	1:32
2.	"Living Song"	1:07
3.	"Loose"	2:14
4.	"Hung Up"	1:49
5.	"Here We Come Around"	2:30
6.	"The Climb"	0:35
7.	"Mountain Rock"	0:58
8.	"Departure Song"	0:50
9.	"Make It Real"	1:32
10.	"Caribou, Timber Wolf"	1:54
11.	"Give Me Some of Your Love"	1:00
12.	"West Nile!!"	0:31
13.	"You Are a Bear (For a New Friend)"	1:42
14.	"Oxygen & the Mellow Stuff"	1:44
15.	"People, Don't You Know??"	0:41
16.	"Suicide Song"	2:07
17.	"Love Song For My Friends"	9:29
Total length:		31:58
