= Shangri-La (Yacht album) =

Studio album by Yacht
- Released: June 21, 2011
- Recorded: 2010–2011
- Genre: Indietronica; synth-pop; dance-punk
- Length: 43:22
- Label: DFA
- Producer: Jona Bechtolt

Yacht chronology
See Mystery Lights (2009)	Shangri-La (2011)	I Thought the Future Would Be Cooler (2015)

Shangri-La is the fifth studio album by American dance-pop band Yacht. It was released on June 21, 2011, via DFA Records. Produced entirely by its member Jona Bechtolt, it marks the band's second album to include Claire L. Evans. It is a concept album about utopia.

== Critical reception ==
Professional ratings
Aggregate scores
Source	Rating
AnyDecentMusic?	6.7/10
Metacritic	75/100
Review scores
Source	Rating
Beats Per Minute	84/100%
Consequence of Sound	B
Entertainment Weekly	B+
Los Angeles Times	3.5/4 stars
Pitchfork	6.5/10
Slant	2.5/5 stars
The A.V. Club	B
The Guardian	3/5 stars
Tiny Mix Tapes	4/5 marks
Under The Radar	6/10 stars

Shangri-La was met with generally favourable reviews from music critics. At Metacritic, which assigns a normalized rating out of 100 to reviews from mainstream publications, the album received an average score of 75, based on twenty-one reviews. The aggregator AnyDecentMusic? has the critical consensus of the album at a 6.7 out of 10, based on twenty-two reviews.

== Track listing ==
All tracks are written by Jona Bechtolt and Claire L. Evans.

No.	Title	Length
1.	"Utopia"	3:09
2.	"Dystopia (The Earth Is on Fire)"	4:01
3.	"I Walked Alone"	4:52
4.	"Love in the Dark"	4:34
5.	"One Step"	3:23
6.	"Holy Roller"	5:11
7.	"Beam Me Up"	2:14
8.	"Paradise Engineering"	3:46
9.	"Tripped and Fell in Love"	7:14
10.	"Shangri-La"	4:58
Total length:		43:22

== Personnel ==
- Jona Bechtolt — songwriter, producer, engineering, mixing
- Claire L. Evans — songwriter
- Rob "Bobby Birdman" Kieswetter — additional vocals & additional vocals arrangement (tracks: 1–5, 7, 10)
- Ryann Bosetti — additional vocals (tracks: 1, 3, 4, 6, 10)
- Susannah Lipsey — additional vocals (tracks: 1, 6, 10)
- Tim Johnson — additional vocals (tracks: 1, 6, 10)
- Jeffrey Brodsky — drums (track 1), congas (track 5)
- Nicholas Miller — additional vocals (track 6)
- Wolf Carr — additional vocals (track 6)
- Jherek Bischoff — strings arrangement & cello (track 10)
- Paris Hurley — violin (track 10)

== Charts ==
Chart (2011)	Peak position
US Top Dance Albums (Billboard)	15
US Heatseekers Albums (Billboard)	30
