= Urban Honking =

Urban Honking is an American webzine and pioneering blogging collective founded in 2001 by Steve Schroeder, Jona Bechtolt and Mike Merrill. The site and the community that has grown up around it are often collectively referred to by the contraction "UrHo" or "URHO."

The site is based in Portland, Oregon, and its content is provided by the authors of the 80+ blogs that are hosted at [urbanhonking.com. The blogs of Urban Honking display a great deal of diversity, and both reflect and innovate upon the most popular topics and trends of the contemporary blogosphere: they range from the traditional open-format personal blog (as with Regarding), to showcases for young, professional artists (Owl and It Won't Fucking Kill You), along with multi-authored efforts that provide opinionated commentary on popular topics such as music and gastronomy (Cowboyz 'n' Poodles and Digest, respectively). Other blogs chronicle the developments of local businesses (The Fresh Pot), non-profit organizations (PICA), and academic research projects (Co-Branded), or explore singular topics, like Science (Space Canon). Though most of the site's blogs are authored by Portlanders, many others are updated by bloggers who reside elsewhere, making Urban Honking a truly global blogging community.

The Ultimate Blogger was an annual reality TV influenced competition operated by the site, where bloggers from around the world participated in weekly "challenges" and posted their results on their personal blogs. The field was narrowed in the same process of elimination popularized by the long-running reality show Survivor, where contestants are "voted off" or awarded "immunity" by their peers. The last contestant left standing is named "the best blogger on the World Wide Web". Those that are eliminated are instructed, with tongue planted firmly in cheek, to vacate the internet immediately. The Ultimate Blogger completed three seasons, and earned a notable amount of attention from popular media outlets.

== History ==
From the website: "The site sat patiently for quite some time and then the blog phenomenon started and breathed new life into UrHo. As the new writers grew so did the audience. Some people moved on, and new people moved in. Group blogs sprung up, photo and other visual blogs, and then Ultimate Blogger, which was a culmination of everything we learned!"

One of the blogs, Regarding, now also has a long-format email mailing list named Zuckerberg's Lament.
