= Giant Surface Music Falling to Earth Like Jewels from the Sky =

Studio album by Yume Bitsu
- Released: 1998
- Recorded: Spring 1998
- Studio: Lewis & Clark College (Portland, OR)
- Genre: Post-rock
- Length: 49:45
- Label: Ba Da Bing
- Producer: Alex Bundy; Adam Forkner

Yume Bitsu chronology
Giant Surface Music Falling to Earth Like Jewels from the Sky (1998)	Yume Bitsu (1999)

Professional ratings
Review scores
Source	Rating
AllMusic	3.5/5 stars

Giant Surface Music Falling to Earth Like Jewels from the Sky is the debut studio album of Yume Bitsu, released in 1998 by Ba Da Bing Records.

== Track listing ==
All tracks are written by Yume Bitsu.

No.	Title	Length
1.	"Of Freedom and Flight"	11:12
2.	"The End of Pain Is Near"	6:36
3.	"Travels Over Seascapes"	11:40
4.	"Flight of the Navigator"	4:00
5.	"Where Fog Blurs and Covers, Emptiness Prevails"	16:17

== Personnel ==
Adapted from the Giant Surface Music Falling to Earth Like Jewels from the Sky liner notes.

Yume Bitsu

- Jason Anderson – drums
- Alex Bundy – sampler, production, recording
- Adam Forkner – vocals, guitar, keyboards, producer, recording
- Franz Prichard – guitar

== Release history ==
Region	Date	Label	Format	Catalog
United States	1998	Ba Da Bing	CD	BING-016
