= New Clouds =

Studio album by White Rainbow
- Released: October 19, 2009; 15 years ago
- Genre: Ambient and psychedelic rock
- Length: 60:04
- Label: Kranky
- Producer: Adam Forkner

White Rainbow chronology
Prism Of Eternal Now (2007)	New Clouds (2009)	THRU.U (2014)

New Clouds is the sixth studio album by Adam Forkner under the band name White Rainbow, released in 2009 under the record company Kranky.

== Reception ==
Professional ratings
Aggregate scores
Source	Rating
Metacritic	72/100
Review scores
Source	Rating
Allmusic	4/5 stars
Mojo	8/10
Pitchfork	7/10

Joe Colly of Pitchfork praised the album, comparing it to a "long-form jazz" or "modern-classical piece".

== Track listing ==
Another Place
No.	Title	Length
1.	"Tuesday Rollers and Strollers"	18:06
2.	"Major Spilage"	12:49
3.	"All the Boogies In the World"	20:09
4.	"Monday Boogies Forward Forever"	16:00

== Charts ==
Chart (2009)	Position
Billboard New Age Albums	7
