= Yume Bitsu (album) =

Studio album by Yume Bitsu
- Released: November 15, 1999
- Genre: Post-rock
- Length: 63:47
- Label: Ba Da Bing
- Producer: Rick Duncan; Yume Bitsu

Yume Bitsu chronology
Giant Surface Music Falling to Earth Like Jewels from the Sky (1998)	Yume Bitsu (1999)	Auspicious Winds (2000)

Professional ratings
Review scores
Source	Rating
AllMusic	3/5 stars

Yume Bitsu is the eponymously titled second studio album by American post-rock band Yume Bitsu, released on November 15, 1999 by Ba Da Bing Records.

== Track listing ==
All tracks are written by Yume Bitsu

No.	Title	Length
1.	"Team Yume"	8:19
2.	"I Wait for You"	7:50
3.	"Surface I"	8:03
4.	"Truth"	11:20
5.	"Surface II"	9:46
6.	"The Frigid, Frigid, Frigid Body of Dr. T.J. Eckleberg"	18:29

== Personnel ==
Adapted from the Yume Bitsu liner notes.

Yume Bitsu

- Jason Anderson – drums
- Alex Bundy – keyboards
- Adam Forkner – vocals, guitar, engineering
- Franz Prichard – guitar

Production and additional personnel

- Rick Duncan – production, engineering, mastering
- Joe Guest – photography
- Yume Bitsu – production

== Release history ==
Region	Date	Label	Format	Catalog
United States	1999	Ba Da Bing	CD	BING-020
