= Privilege (Abridged) =

Studio album by Parenthetical Girls
- Released: 14 February 2013
- Recorded: 2010–2012
- Genres: Chamber pop, experimental
- Length: 43:25
- Label: Slender Means Society
- Producer: Parenthetical Girls

Parenthetical Girls chronology
Entanglements (2008)	Privilege (Abridged) (2013)

Professional ratings
Review scores
Source	Rating
Consequence of Sound	3/5 stars
Pitchfork	(6.5/10.0)
Paste	8.7/10 stars
NME	8/10 stars

Privilege (Abridged) is the fourth full-length album from indie rock ensemble Parenthetical Girls, released on February 14, 2013. In December 2012, it was announced via the Parenthetical Girls Twitter account that there would be an official, abridged version of the Privilege series of EPs, which began in 2010.

The album includes a DVD featuring "[seven] promotional films, blood draw documentation, live performances, [and] other ephemera."

== Track listing ==
1. Evelyn McHale – 3:49
2. The Common Touch – 4:01
3. Careful Who You Dance With – 2:39
4. For All The Final Girls – 3:06
5. The Pornographer – 3:16
6. Sympathy For Spastics – 2:28
7. Weaknesses – 3:21
8. A Note To Self – 3:10
9. Young Throats – 4:02
10. On Death & Endearments – 4:38
11. The Privilege – 4:52
12. Curtains – 4:04
