= Mega (Yacht album) =

Studio album by Yacht
- Released: 2005
- Genre: Experimental, electronica
- Length: 22:45
- Label: States Rights Records

Yacht chronology
Super Warren MMIV (2004)	Mega (2005)	I Believe in You. Your Magic is Real (2007)

Mega is the second full-length album released by electronic rock band Yacht. It was released on States Rights Records in 2005. The last track is a remix of the song "Now It Is All Over Like the Birds" by Thanksgiving.

== Track listing ==
1. "Hello? Hello?" – 0:09
2. "Totally Stoked (On You)" – 3:39
3. "Hot Dog" (Iron Cobra version) – 1:29
4. "Roar" (Opps version) – 1:22
5. "I Love a Computer" (Anacortes version) – 1:54
6. "Dans Denmark" (2005 version) – 2:42
7. "Moot Point" – 1:04
8. "I Fought with My Friend (Call Back)" – 2:14
9. "Why Do Trucks? Etc." – 0:24
10. "Daydreams with Daffodils" – 0:55
11. "Vacationland Guitaroo" – 2:23
12. "Possessive" – 0:33
13. "Night Terrors" (grunge version) – 1:28
14. "DC November 2003" – 0:44
15. "Now It Is All Over Like the Birds" (Thanksgiving remix version) – 1:52
