= Yume Bitsu =

American post-rock band

- Origin: Portland, Oregon, U.S.
- Genres: Post-rock, psychedelic rock
- Years active: 1995–2002
- Members: Adam Forkner; Franz Prichard; Alex Bundy; Jason Anderson

Yume Bitsu (meaning "dream beats" in Japanese) was an American post-rock band from Portland, Oregon, active from 1995 and 2002.

== History ==
Their debut Giant Surface Music Falling to Earth Like Jewels from the Sky was self-released in 1998 and was re-released by Ba Da Bing Records in 1999. Their self-titled second album and was released in 1999. Their third LP, Auspicious Winds, was released by K Records in 2000. Their fourth and final album Golden Vessyl of Sound was released in 2002 by K Records. It received a rating of 8.5 out of 10 from music criticism site pitchfork.com. Beyond full-length records, Yume Bitsu released two vinyl EPs: a split 12-inch vinyl EP with Andrew Reiger of Elf Power was released in 2002 on Planaria Records and Wabi Morning, a one-sided twelve-inch, was released in 2003 on Burnt Toast Vinyl. Recordings of live shows from 2002 (originally available as the fourth side of the vinyl version of 2002's Golden Vessyl of Sound) were released by States Rights Records in 2002.

Vocalist and guitarist Adam Forkner is active as White Rainbow and was part of Surface of Eceon, a group which featured Forkner along with members of Landing. Forkner also recorded VVRSSNN on K Records.

Guitarist Franz Prichard was a part of the Japanese instrumental rock group kabaddi kabaddi kabaddi kabaddi, which included members of Japanese rock bands Moools and Maher Shalal Hash Baz. A self-titled record was released in Japan in 2005.

Drummer Jason Anderson is a singer-songwriter with releases on K Records.

== Members ==
- Adam Forkner (guitar/vocals)
- Franz Prichard (guitar)
- Alex Bundy (keyboard/electronics)
- Jason Anderson (drum/percussion)

== Discography ==
- Giant Surface Music Falling to Earth Like Jewels from the Sky (1998)
- Yume Bitsu (1999)
- Auspicious Winds (2000)
- Golden Vessyl of Sound (2002)
