= Bonus Album (The Blow EP) =

Studio album by The Blow
- Released: October 1, 2002
- Length: 20:11
- Label: K Records
- Producer: The Blow

Professional ratings
Review scores
Source	Rating
AllMusic	3/5 stars
Pitchfork	6.0/10
Stylus	C

Bonus Album is the first EP released by Khaela Maricich under the band name The Blow. It was released in 2002 by K Records.

== Track listing ==
All tracks by Khaela Maricich except where noted.

1. "The Democracy of Small Things" – 2:23
2. "She Buried Herself In the Air" – 0:48
3. "Some Chocolates" – 1:37
4. "Jet Ski Accidents" (Anderson) – 2:49
5. "The Moon Is There, I Am Here" – 2:54
6. "The Touch Me" – 1:40
7. "Sing Like Kyle" – 0:48
8. "Watch the Water Roll Up" – 3:41
9. "Little Sally Tutorial" – 3:00

== Personnel ==
- Phil Elvrum – Voices, Producer, Engineer
- Johannah Goldstein – Voices
- Calvin Johnson – Voices
- Khaela Maricich – Engineer
- Jason McCloud – Vocals (background)
- Mirah – Vocals
