= Entanglements =

Studio album by Parenthetical Girls
- Released: 9 September 2008
- Recorded: 2008
- Genre: Chamber pop, experimental
- Length: 32:41
- Label: Tomlab
- Producer: Parenthetical Girls

Parenthetical Girls chronology
Safe as Houses (2006)	Entanglements (2008)	Privilege (Abridged) (2013)

Professional ratings
Review scores
Source	Rating
Allmusic	4/5 stars
Pitchfork Media	(7.3/10)

Entanglements is the third full-length album from indie rock ensemble Parenthetical Girls.

== Track listing ==
1. "Four Words" - 3:10
2. "Avenue of Trees" - 3:17
3. "Unmentionables" - 1:51
4. "Gut Symmetries" - 3:58
5. "A Song for Ellie Greenwich" - 2:55
6. "Young Eucharists" - 3:44
7. "Entanglement" - 1:38
8. "Abandoning" - 1:42
9. "The Former" - 3:16
10. "Windmills of Your Mind" - 2:44
11. "This Regrettable End" - 4:26

== Personnel ==
- Zac Pennington
- Jherek Bischoff
- Matthew Carlson
- Edward Crichton
- Rachael Jensen
