= Safe as Houses (album) =

Studio album by Parenthetical Girls
- Released: June 27, 2006
- Recorded: 2005
- Genre: Indie rock
- Length: 38:10
- Label: Slender Means Society / Acuarela Discos / Oedipus Records (LP Version)
- Producer: Jherek Bischoff

Parenthetical Girls chronology
(((GRRRLS))) (2004)	Safe as Houses (2006)	Entanglements (2008)

Professional ratings
Review scores
Source	Rating
Allmusic	link
Pitchfork Media	7.9/10 link

Safe as Houses is the second full-length album from indie rock ensemble Parenthetical Girls. It was released on June 27, 2006 on Slender Means Society and April 27, 2007 on Acuarela Discos. It features album art by American artist Autumn Whitehurst.

== Track listing ==
1. "Love Connection, Pt. II" - 5:16
2. "I Was the Dancer" - 4:42
3. "Oh Daughter/Disaster" - 4:01
4. "One Father, Another" - 3:16
5. "The Weight She Fell Under" - 3:09
6. "Survived by Her Mother" - 3:34
7. "Keyholes and Curtains" - 4:01
8. "Forward to Forget" - 2:45
9. "The Four Platitudes (A Bridge Song)" - 3:16
10. "Stolen Children" - 4:10

== Personnel ==
- Zac Pennington – vocals, keyboards, glockenspiel, guitar
- Jherek Bischoff – percussion, violin, upright bass, bass guitar, clarinet, vocals
- Sam Mickens – guitar, synthesizer, piano, vocals
