= Auspicious Winds =

Studio album by Yume Bitsu
- Released: November 14, 2000
- Recorded: February–June 2000
- Studio: Radsoul and Dub Narcotic Studios (Portland, OR)
- Genre: Post-rock
- Length: 48:18
- Label: K

Yume Bitsu chronology
Yume Bitsu (1999)	Auspicious Winds (2000)	Golden Vessyl of Sound (2002)

Professional ratings
Review scores
Source	Rating
Allmusic	3/5 stars
Alternative Press	4/5 stars

Auspicious Winds is the third studio album by Yume Bitsu, released on November 14, 2000, by K Records.

== Track listing ==
No.	Title	Writer(s)	Length
1.	"The Wedding Procession"	Jason Anderson, Alex Bundy, Adam Forkner, Franz Prichard	13:55
2.	"Doctor Trips"	Franz Prichard	4:54
3.	"Sharp, Twisted"	Adam Forkner	4:15
4.	"Mothmen Meet the Council of Frogs"	Alex Bundy	12:50
5.	"Into the Hole"	Jason Anderson	12:24

== Personnel ==
Adapted from the Auspicious Winds liner notes.

Yume Bitsu

- Jason Anderson – drums
- Alex Bundy – keyboards
- Adam Forkner – vocals, guitar
- Franz Prichard – guitar, design

Production and design

- Rick Duncan – recording
- Mark Greer – mastering
- Joe Guest – photography
- Calvin Johnson – recording, photography

== Release history ==
Region	Date	Label	Format	Catalog
United States	2000	K	CD, LP	KLP 121
