= Boyd Elder =

American painter

- Born: Harold Boyd Elder; January 12, 1944; El Paso, Texas, U.S.
- Died: October 6, 2018 (aged 74); San Marcos, Texas, U.S.
- Occupations: Painter; sculptor
- Years active: 1972–2018
- Children: 2 (Shauna Elder and Flaunn Elder)

Harold Boyd Elder (January 12, 1944 – October 6, 2018), (Note: Also known as "El Chingadero",) was an American artist. Elder studied art at the Chouinard Art Institute in Los Angeles and earned his Bachelor of Fine Arts degree in 1968. Elder had a major exhibition of his works in an art gallery in 1972.

Elder is best known for creating the painted skulls used in the cover artwork for The Eagles' 1975 album One of These Nights and their compilation album Their Greatest Hits (1971–1975). On October 16, 2018, Elder died of natural causes in San Marcos, Texas.

== Early life ==
Elder was born in El Paso, Texas, to Hal Elder and Billye Lee Bell Elder, a family with close links to Valentine, Texas. He had two brothers Kenneth Mack Elder and Howard Stanton Elder. He studied at Burges High School and El Paso Tech in El Paso. He developed an interest in art, and took lessons in art at the El Paso Museum of Art on weeknights and weekends.

After high school, he won a scholarship to Chouinard Art Institute in Los Angeles in 1963 where he studied painting and sculpture. He also worked as a teaching assistant and earned his BFA degree in 1968. He was a friend of Bobby Fuller, who acted as a patron and helped establish Elder's first studio in Los Angeles. The intention was that Elder would create artwork for Fuller's album covers, although the project was never realized after Fuller died in 1966.

== Career ==
After graduating, Boyd returned to El Paso and later set up a workshop in Valentine where he created artwork made of polyester resin.

In April 1972, Elder exhibited his latest works in an art gallery in Venice, California, in a solo show titled "El Chingadero" (meaning "The Fucker"). The show was attended by musicians such as Joni Mitchell, Jackson Browne, and Mama Cass Elliot; among those who attended the opening were members of the newly-formed Eagles who performed at the show, an early appearance by the band as the Eagles. However, on May 31, 1973, his studio burnt down including 15 pieces of the artwork that he had planned to exhibit. Having also lost his art supplies in the fire, he started to use the skulls of animals including a cow and a bull that had died in a flood on which to paint, inspired by a painted turkey breastbone sent to him as a present by Rick Griffin. Wings and feathers were then added to the skulls.

Elder was a friend of the album cover designer Gary Burden, who was responsible for the Eagles' three previous albums and was interested in using one of Elder's skull pieces for this cover. Elder presented two of his works to the Eagles in Dallas in late 1974, one of which was then chosen for the cover of One of These Nights. Later another work of Elder, an image of an eagle's skull, would be used for the cover of Their Greatest Hits album. The work was created from a plastic cast of an eagle skull, which was then painted. The skull was set against a light-blue background made of silver mylar, and the bumpy appearance of the background gave rise to a myth that it was cocaine powder that they were using. Glenn Frey also noticed the resemblance, telling Elder that the background reminded him of "a field of blow" (slang term for cocaine), however the band chose not to debunk the myth. The artist was paid $5,000 for the work. Another skull created by Elder was also used in Eagles' compilation album The Very Best Of. He appeared in an image in the back cover of Eagles' album Desperado.

Elder continued to produce a number of skull artwork after the Eagles covers. He also produced works in various media such as plastics and resins, holographic foil and aluminum, as well as multi-media works. He also produced album artwork for other artists such as Yacht. He served as caretaker for an art installation called Prada Marfa, a fake Prada store erected in Valentine.

He produced artwork in Valentine and showed them in the nearby town of Marfa, Texas. He also worked in California and Hawaii.

== Personal life ==
Elder met Luann Darling Finlayson while he was studying at Chouinard in Los Angeles. They moved back to El Paso where their daughter Flaunn was born in 1968. They then moved to Valentine and their second daughter Shaula was born in 1971 in nearby Marfa. The family moved to Kona, Hawaii, in 1979, but the couple separated in 1981 and Elder moved back to Texas.

Elder died on October 6, 2018, of natural causes at age 74 in San Marcos, Texas.
