= Paper Television =

Studio album by The Blow
- Released: October 24, 2006
- Length: 30:15
- Label: K Records
- Producer: The Blow

Professional ratings
Review scores
Source	Rating
Allmusic	4/5 stars
Drowned in Sound	8/10
Exclaim!	positive
Pitchfork Media	8.3/10
PopMatters	8/10
Prefix	6/10

Paper Television is the fourth LP from The Blow. It is also the band's first album as a duo consisting of Khaela Maricich and Jona Bechtolt. Previously, Khaela Maricich had been the sole member.

== Track listing ==
1. "Pile of Gold" – 2:12
2. "Parentheses" – 3:33
3. "The Big U" – 2:32
4. "The Long List of Girls" – 2:55
5. "Bonjour Jeune Fille" – 2:50
6. "Babay (Eat a Critter, Feel Its Wrath)" – 3:09
7. "Eat Your Heart Up" – 2:14
8. "Pardon Me" – 3:13
9. "Fists Up" – 4:14
10. "True Affection" – 3:23

All songs produced, recorded, performed, and written by The Blow.
