= The Blow =

American electro pop band

- Origin: Olympia, Washington, United States
- Genres: Indie pop, electro, lo-fi
- Years active: 2001–present
- Labels: K Records and Kanine Records (United States); Tomlab (Europe); Popfrenzy (Australia)
- Members: Khaela Maricich; Melissa Dyne
- Past members: Jona Bechtolt

The Blow is an American electro pop band, comprising Khaela Maricich and Melissa Dyne. Maricich and Dyne write, compose, produce and perform all the music. It was formed as a solo project by Maricich in 2002, and she was joined by Jona Bechtolt, from Yacht, from 2004 to 2007. Melissa Dyne became part of the project in 2007.

The live shows often incorporate monologues and other performance elements. Melissa Dyne began collaborating with Maricich on the live Blow shows starting in 2007, gradually incorporating her background in installation, sound, and conceptual art into the live show. Dyne performs live from a location off stage. Maricich and Dyne composed and produced an eponymous album for The Blow, released in 2013. They have given a series of artist talks discussing The Blow as a mode of performance art.

== History ==
=== Formation ===
The Blow was formed in Olympia, Washington, United States. Maricich's solo music project had previously been called Get the Hell Out of the Way of the Volcano. Dyne was influenced by her childhood classical cello training, while Maricich has cited English popular music acts such as The Beat, OMD, XTC, and Erasure.

The first Blow releases, Everyday Examples of Humans Facing Straight into The Blow and Don't Do the Bomb Before My Mustache Comes, were made as home recordings by Maricich in 2001. Soon afterwards, Maricich began working with K Records, releasing Bonus Album in 2002 and The Concussive Caress in 2003. Both albums were engineered and produced by Maricich at K Records' Dub Narcotic Studio. The live performance of Concussive Caress was a monologue interspersed with songs, titled Blue Sky vs. Night Sky. Maricich toured the performance extensively in clubs, house parties, and art venues; it was part of Portland Institute of Contemporary Art's TBA festival and was performed at the LTTR Explosion at Art in General in New York. In 2004, Maricich began collaborating with Jona Bechtolt, and The Blow relocated to Portland. Together they produced two albums, Poor Aim: Love Songs, released in 2004 via States Rights Records/The Slender Means Society (later rereleased by K in 2007), and Paper Television, released on K Records in 2006. The Blow has been based in Brooklyn, NY since 2008.

In 2011, The Blow began recording a new album about "someone who is quasi-lesbian and might have gone off the rails." At performances Maricich claimed that the songs were for Lindsay Lohan's new album. The recording was completed in 2012 and includes guest appearances from Rostam Batmanglij, Bashiri Johnson, Sarab Singh, Mirah Zeitlyn, Rainy Orteca, Brian Patrick Hill, and Brian Taylor.

The Blow's album titled The Blow was released October 1, 2013, on the Brooklyn-based indie label, Kanine Records.

== Discography ==
=== Albums ===
- Look for It in the Sky, It Will Always Be There (1998 Knw-Yr-Own Records) (released under the artist name "Get the Hell Out of the Way of the Volcano")
- Everyday Examples of Humans Facing Straight into the Blow (2001, 2004 K Records) (originally self-released under the artist name "Get the Hell Out of the Way of the Volcano")
- Don't Do the Bomb Before My Moustache Comes (2002, self-released)
- Bonus Album E.P. (2002, K Records)
- The Concussive Caress, Or, Casey Caught Her Mom Singing Along with the Vacuum (2003, K Records)
- Poor Aim: Love Songs E.P. (2005, Slender Means Society/States Rights Records)
- Paper Television (2006, K Records)
- Poor Aim: Love Songs (2007, K Records)
- The Blow (2013, Kanine Records)
- Brand New Abyss (2017)

=== Singles ===
- "Alphabet Series K" (2006, Tomlab)
- "Parentheses" (2007, Tomlab)

=== Compilations ===
- Yoyo a Go Go (1997, Yoyo) A compilation of live performances from various artists at the Yoyo A Gogo music festival. Khaela performs "A Girl in the Sky" with Jenn Kliese
- Projector (1998, Yoyo) Get the Hell Out of the Way of the Volcano "Bagfull of Spiders"
- Remote Wing (2001, Knw-Yr-Own), an alternate version of "That Boy Makes me Want Things" from Everyday Examples..., retitled simply "That Boy"
- Shipwreck Day (2002, Knw-Yr-Own), a cover of the Little Wing's "Faith Children"
- Own Zone (2004, States Rights Records), remix of "Hey Boy"
- Invisible Shield (2004, K Records), "The Democracy of Small Things"
- Good Grooming for Girls (2004, Shameless Magazine), "What Tom Said About the Girls"
- Trust in Sirens (2005, Kelp Monthly), a cover of Devo's "Snowball"
- 2005 PDX Pop Now! (2005, PDX Pop), "Pile of Gold"
- Free the Bird (2006, Kelp Monthly), "The Sky Opened Wide Like the Tide (Lucky Dragons New Age Power Mix)"
- 2006 PDX Pop Now! (2006, PDX Pop), "Babay (Eat a Critter, Feel Its Wrath)"
- Yeti No. 4 (2006, Yeti Publishing), "Get Around"
- Joyride: Remixes (2006, K Records), a cover of Mirah's "The Garden"

== Accolades ==
- 'Parentheses' Ranked No. 55 in Pitchfork's "Top 100 Tracks of 2006"
- Paper Television Ranked No. 66 in Idolater 2006 Jackin' Pop Critics Poll "Top Albums" category"
- 'Parentheses' Ranked No. 66 in Idolater 2006 Jackin' Pop Critics Poll "Top Tracks" category"
