= Stacy Horn =

American author and businesswoman

- Born: June 3, 1956 (age 70); Norfolk, Virginia
- Education: Tufts University; New York University
- Occupations: Author, journalist

Stacy Horn (born June 3, 1956) is an American author, businesswoman and occasional journalist.

She was born in Norfolk, Virginia, and grew up on Long Island, New York. Horn received a B.F.A. from Tufts University and the School of the Museum of Fine Arts. She received a graduate degree from New York University's Interactive Telecommunications Program.

In 1990, after working as a telecommunications analyst for Mobil Corporation, Horn founded Echo, a New York-based bulletin board system.

== EchoNYC ==
Stacy Horn founded EchoNYC or Echo, a New York City Internet salon, in 1990, whose members are called Echoids and go by their real names rather than a UserName. The WELL, one of the oldest virtual communities in continuous operation, was an influence. Horn later decided that Echo stood for "East Coast Hang Out".

Horn saw the Echo bulletin board system as a place where conversation could revolve around literature, film, culture, and sex, rather than the more pervasive topics of computer technology at the time. Originally run out of Horn's apartment in Greenwich Village in her spare time, Echo rapidly expanded its membership, and eventually consumed every free phone line in her Greenwich Village neighborhood, requiring New York Telephone to run a separate cable to Horn's apartment. In 1990, Echo became a company with a core group of members chosen by Horn for their "strong on-line personalities", who were responsible for creating enticing discussions to attract users. She donated twenty years worth of Echo's archives to the New York Historical Society.

== Books ==
Her first book, Cyberville: Clicks, Culture and the Creation of an Online Town (Warner Books, 1998), describes the community that formed on Echo, the problems Horn encountered as Echo's final authority, and her observations about the nature of the virtual world. Through the 90s, she was often profiled and quoted in articles about life and business on the internet. Her book is still used in courses on the sociology of virtual communities.

The publication of her second book, Waiting For My Cats to Die: A Morbid Memoir (St. Martin's Press, 2001), a memoir about her midlife crisis, revealing an unusual fascination with death, coincided with a series of commentaries for the NPR's All Things Considered on the same subject.

Her third book, The Restless Sleep: Inside New York City's Cold Case Squad (Viking, 2005), recounts the stories of four of New York's cold cases and profiles the detectives who investigate them.

Her fourth book, Unbelievable: Investigations into Ghosts, Poltergeists, Telepathy, and Other Unseen Phenomena, from the Duke Parapsychology Laboratory, was published in 2009.

Her fifth book is about singing. It is titled Imperfect Harmony: Finding Happiness Singing With Others, and it was published by Algonquin Books in 2013.

Her sixth book, titled Damnation Island: Poor, Sick, Mad, and Criminal in 19th-Century New York, is about Blackwell's Island and was also published by Algonquin Books in May, 2018.

Her seventh book, The Killing Fields of East New York: The First Subprime Mortgage Scandal, a White-Collar Crime Spree, and the Collapse of an American Neighborhood, uses the history of East New York, Brooklyn, to explore the connection between white collar crime and the destruction of neighborhoods of color across America. It was published by Gillian Flynn Books and Zando Projects in January, 2025.

== Selected bibliography ==
- Horn, Stacy (January 1998). Cyberville: Clicks, Culture, and the Creation of an Online Town. New York: Warner Books. ISBN 978-0-446-51909-0.
- Horn, Stacy (2001). Waiting for My Cats to Die: A Morbid Memoir. New York: St. Martin's Press.
- Horn, Stacy (2005). The Restless Sleep: Inside New York City's Cold Case Squad. New York: Viking.
- Horn, Stacy (2009). Unbelievable: Investigations into Ghosts, Poltergeists, Telepathy, and Other Unseen Phenomena from the Duke Parapsychology Laboratory. New York: Ecco.
- Horn, Stacy (2013). Imperfect Harmony: Finding Happiness Singing With Others. New York: Algonquin Books.
- Horn, Stacy (2018). Damnation Island: : Poor, Sick, Mad, and Criminal in 19th-Century New York. New York: Algonquin Books.
- Horn, Stacy (2025). The Killing Fields of East New York: The First Subprime Mortgage Scandal, a White-Collar Crime Spree, and the Collapse of an American Neighborhood. New York: Gillian Flynn Books and Zando Projects.
