= Claire L. Evans =

American singer, writer and artist

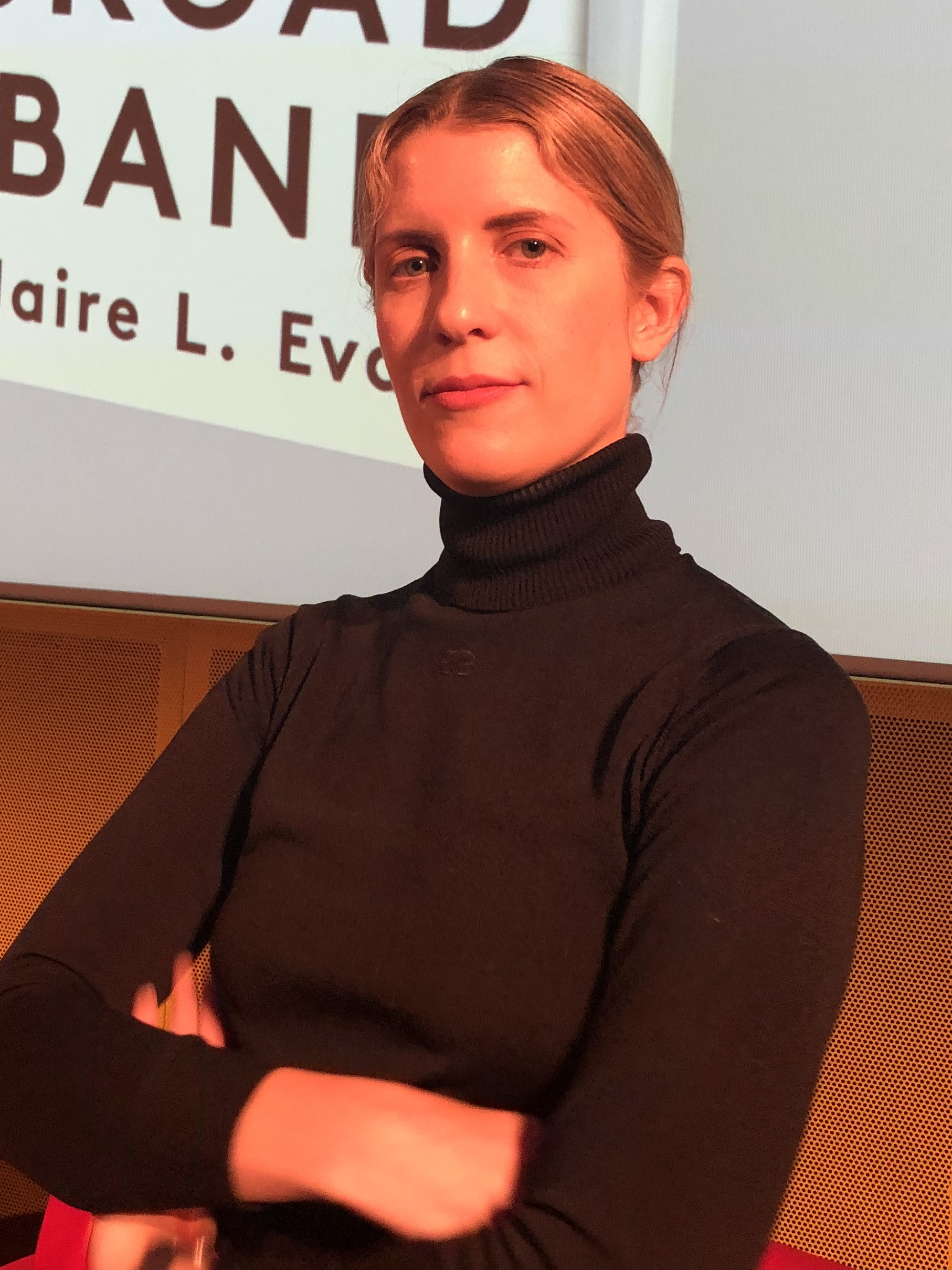
- Evans in 2019

Background information
- Origin: Portland, Oregon, United States
- Genres: Indie rock, electropop, dance-pop
- Years active: 2008–present
- Labels: DFA, States Rights, Marriage
- Website: clairelevans.com

Claire L. Evans is an American singer, writer and artist based in Los Angeles, California. She is the lead singer of the pop duo YACHT.

Evans joined YACHT in 2008 after sharing a "mystical experience" with collaborator Jona Bechtolt and has recorded four albums, namely See Mystery Lights, Shangri-La, I Thought the Future Would Be Cooler, and Chain Tripping with Bechtolt. She also appeared as a guest on YACHT's third album I Believe in You. Your Magic Is Real. Known for her androgynous onstage persona as a performer, she has been called a "neo-Annie Lennox" by The New York Times. NPR music journalist Bob Boilen has referred to her as "one of the most striking performers I've seen in a rock band".

In addition, Evans is a journalist and author of Broad Band: The Untold Story of the Women Who Made the Internet. With a popular science and culture blog titled Universe, hosted by National Geographic's Scienceblogs network, her essay for Universe "Moon Art: Fallen Astronaut" was anthologized in The Best Science Writing Online 2012. She also writes for Vice, The Guardian, Wired and Aeon. In August 2013, she became the editor-in-chief of OMNI Reboot, a new online version of the science magazine OMNI. She is the former Futures Editor of Motherboard, Vice's technology and science website. She profiled former hacker Susan Headley in The Verge in 2022; as of 2024, a film based on the profile was in development.

Evans is a member of the feminist collective Deep Lab. She is the creator of the app 5 Every Day. She is also the writer for her first game, Blippo+, released in 2025.

== Works ==
- High Frontiers, Publication Studio, 2013. ISBN 9781624620096
- Broad Band, Penguin Random House, 2018. ISBN 9780735211759
- Terraform: Watch/Worlds/Burn, MCD x FSG Originals, Farrar, Straus and Giroux, New York, 2022. ISBN 9780374602666
