= Jona Bechtolt =

American electronic musician (born 1980)

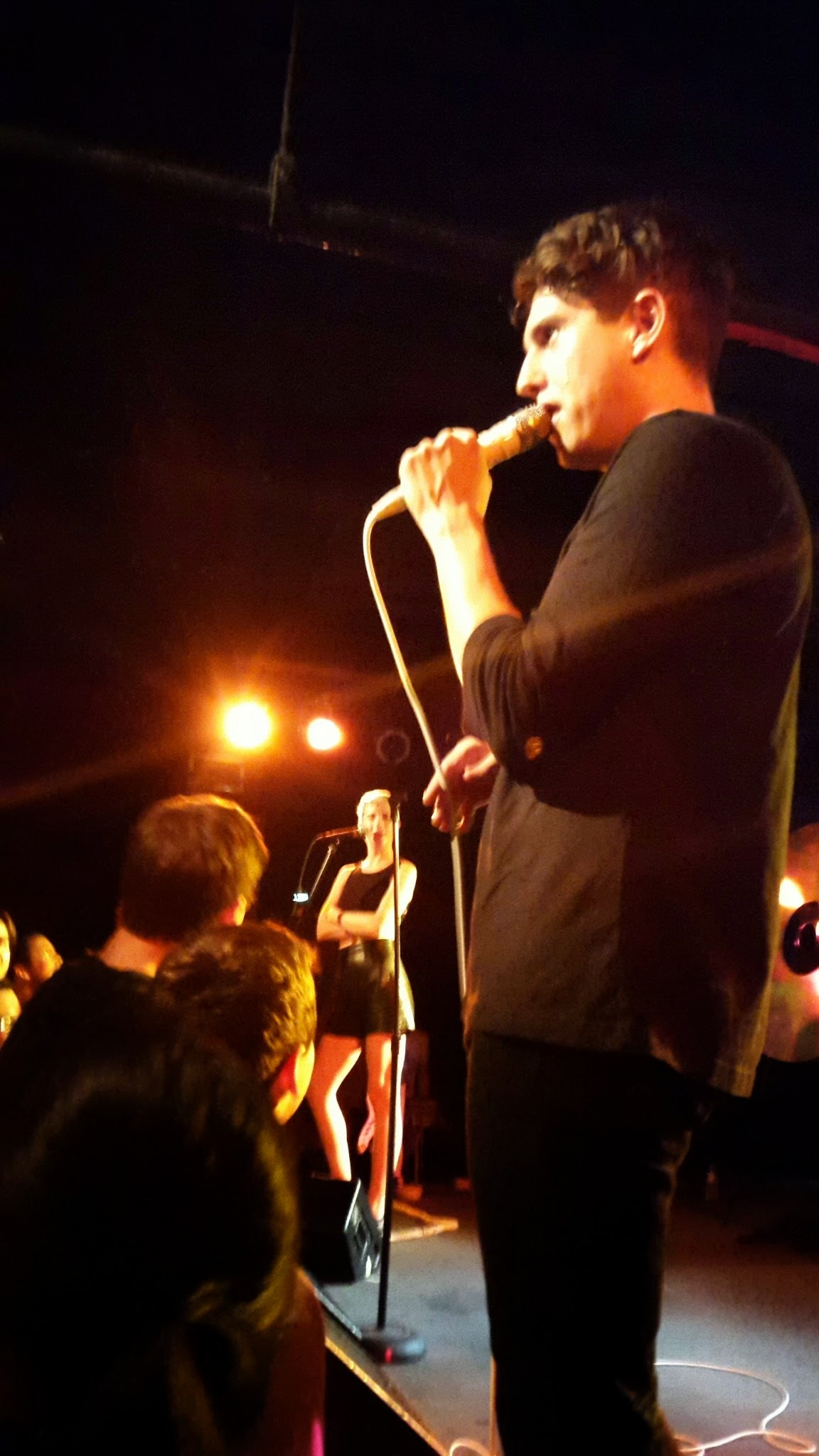

Background information
- Also known as: Yacht
- Born: Jonathan Warren Bechtolt; December 2, 1980 (age 45)
- Origin: Portland, Oregon, United States
- Genres: Indie rock, disco, grunge, electropop, glitch
- Years active: Since 2003 (as Yacht)
- Labels: DFA, States Rights, Marriage
- Website: www.teamyacht.com

Jona Bechtolt (born December 2, 1980) is an electronic musician and multimedia artist based in Portland, Oregon, United States, best known for his band YΔCHT. He is a former member of The Badger King, Dirty Projectors, and The Blow. YΔCHT began in 2003 as a vehicle for his solo work, but in 2008 became a duo with the addition of singer Claire L. Evans.

== Background ==
Bechtolt was born in Madison, Wisconsin and was raised in Astoria, Oregon. Bechtolt began playing music as a teenager. He never attended high school, instead opting to play drums and tour the U.S. with his brother Joel Bechtolt in their punk band, Allegro. He started working with electronics in the late 1990s. He has been a vegetarian for most of his life and a vegan since 2000.

== YACHT ==
In January 2006, Yacht was commissioned for two performances for the New York based art and technology platform Rhizome, as part of their "Crap-tops vs Laptops" show. In February 2006, he performed at the Museum of Modern Art's P.S. 1 Contemporary Art Center and produced an hour-long internet radio program with Clear Cut Press; a Northwest-based publisher of new literary work.

In 2007, Yacht released I Believe in You, Your Magic Is Real on Marriage Records. For the release party, Bechtolt performed a concert on an actual yacht on the Willamette River in Portland.

His live performances include dancing to the music that he has created as well as elaborate PowerPoint presentations. He documents his professional and sometimes personal life via video, text, and images on his blog.

== Software infringement ==
In early 2009, Bechtolt stated during an interview that he uses unlicensed copies of audio software for music production. He claimed to possess unauthorized copies of software made by Audio Damage and Propellerhead Software, and to have previously used copied versions of Ableton Live. This caused a "nerd flame war" with the makers of Audio Damage.

== Other projects ==
In 2003, Bechtolt was commissioned to create a full length audio/visual electronic pop opera by the Portland Institute for Contemporary Art (PICA). He performed with his group The Badger King with bandmate M. Ritchey (a Wolf Colonel and Dear Nora alumnus who went on to record alone as Manta, and then Mantar).

In 2006, Bechtolt collaborated with Khaela Maricich as half of the pop group the Blow to release Paper Television. Bechtolt toured extensively with the Blow, providing beats and backup vocals until quitting the band in 2007 in order to focus on his work in YACHT.

He is a co-founder of the Portland-based popular blogging web community Urban Honking as well as the producer, editor, cameraman and a writer of The Ultimate Blogger.

== Discography ==
=== Solo (as Yacht and Y.A.C.H.T.) ===
- Mike's Crest (2003, States Rights Records)
- Super Warren MMIV (2004, States Rights)
- MEGA (2005, Marriage Records)
- Our Friends In Hell (2007, States Rights)
- I Believe in You. Your Magic Is Real (2007, Marriage)
- Summer Song EP (2008, DFA Records)
- See Mystery Lights (2009, DFA)
- Shangri-La (2011, DFA)
- I Thought the Future Would Be Cooler (2015, Downtown Records)
- Chain Tripping (2019, DFA)

=== Appearances ===
- The Badger King, The Lighthouse, The Giant (2001, This Heart Plays Records)
- The Badger King, Tongue & Tooth EP (2002, States Rights Records)
- The Badger King, Break Up (2003, States Rights Records)
- Little Wings, Magic Wand (2004, K Records)
- The Blow, Poor Aim: Love Songs (2004, States Rights/Slender Means Society/K Records)
- Various Artists, Own Zone (2004, States Rights)
- Devendra Banhart, Cripple Crow (2005, XL Recordings)
- Mantar, Classic Battles (2005, Marriage)
- Calvin Johnson, "Before The Dream Faded..." (2005, K Records)
- Dirty Projectors, "The Getty Address" (2005, Western Vinyl)
- Various Artists, Bro Zone (2005, States Rights)
- Bobby Birdman, Giraffes and Jackals (2006, States Rights)
- The Blow, Paper Television (2006, K Records)
- Architecture in Helsinki, We Died, They Remixed (2006, Inertia)
- David Shrigley, Worried Noodles (2007, Tomlab)
- Various artists, Grown Zone/Groan Zone (2007, States Rights)
- Panther, Secret Lawns (2007, Fryk Beat)

== See also ==
- List of vegans
