= Parenthetical Girls =

Pop band from Washington, US

- Origin: Everett, Washington, United States
- Genres: Experimental pop; chamber pop
- Years active: 2002–2013
- Labels: Slender Means Society, Acuarela Discos, Tomlab
- Past members: Zac Pennington; Jherek Bischoff; Amber W. Smith; Paul Alcott; Eddy Crichton; Freddy Ruppert; Rachael Jensen; Jeremy Cooper; Sam Mickens; Matt Carlson; Rebecca Carlisle-Healy; Owen Ashworth; Brenna Murphy

Parenthetical Girls was an experimental pop band formed in Everett, Washington in 2002, and disbanded in 2013.

== History ==
Begun by lead singer Zac Pennington, the band originally known as Swastika Girls in 2003.

Pennington released (((GRRRLS))), the band's vinyl-only debut album, on his own Slender Means Society label in 2004. Recorded with the help of Jherek Bischoff and Jamie Stewart (the latter of Xiu Xiu), (((GRRRLS))) featured different mixes of the seven songs on each side of the record.

Beginning in 2010, the band released a series of limited 12" EPs which would later be compiled into their 2013 album Privilege. The records were sold through Pennington's Slender Means Society label directly to fans, rather than distributed to record stores. At the end of the cycle, the fifth record came packaged with a box to house all the releases. The release was notable as each record was hand-numbered in the blood of the band number featured on the cover.

== Breakup ==
On June 19, 2017, Pennington announced his new project, Comedienne, which includes Deerhoof's Greg Saunier and longtime collaborator Jherek Bischoff. The announcement came alongside news that Parenthetical Girls was officially defunct.

As of 2019, Pennington was engaged in a project entitled Popular Music, alongside Prudence Rees-Lee. They released their first album, a collection of covers from pop culture, called Popular Music Plays in Darkness, on November 20, 2020. Their second album, Minor Works, was released on October 13, 2023. Their third album, Against Men, was released on April 18, 2025.

== Discography ==
=== Albums ===
- 2004 (((GRRRLS)))
- 2006 Safe as Houses
- 2008 Entanglements
- 2013 Privilege (Abridged)

=== Singles and EPs ===
- 2004 Christmas with Parenthetical Girls EP
- 2006 Twenty Bees 7"
- 2006 A Parenthetical Girls Family Christmas EP
- 2007 Parenthetical Girls/The Dead Science split 7-inch|Parenthetical Girls/Dead Science 7" split
- 2007 Addendum (Safe as Houses European bonus EP)
- 2008 A David Horvitz Picture Disc with Parenthetical Girls
- 2008 A Song for Ellie Greenwich
- 2009 The Scottish Play: Wherein the Group Parenthetical Girls Pay Well-intentioned (If Occasionally Misguided) Tribute to the Works of Ivor Cutler (mini-album)
- 2009 Morrissey/The Smiths 7" split (with Xiu Xiu)
- 2009 The Christmas Creep
- 2010 Tomlab Alphabet Singles Series Z
- 2010 Privilege, Pt. I: On Death & Endearments
- 2010 Privilege, Pt. II: The Past, Imperfect
- 2011 Untanglements (Entanglements alternate versions)
- 2011 Covers (rare cover versions)
- 2011 Privilege, Pt. III: Mend & Make Do
- 2011 Careful Who You Dance With (remixes EP)
- 2011 Extra Life/Parenthetical Girls 12" split
- 2011 Demos for the Dreaming (Kate Bush covers)
- 2011 Privilege, pt. IV: Sympathy For Spastics
- 2011 Parenthetical Girls Save Christmas
- 2012 Privilege, pt. V: Portrait of a Reputation
- 2012 Good Christian Men Rejoice, It's Parenthetical Girls

== Band members ==
Final members

- Zac Pennington – vocals, guitars, glockenspiel, keyboards, other instruments (2002–2013)
- Jherek Bischoff – percussion, drums, keyboards, production, arrangements (studio: 2003–2013, live: 2010–2011)
- Amber W. Smith – keyboards, backing vocals (2011–2013)
- Paul Alcott – drums, keyboards, electronic percussion (2011–2013)

Former members

- Jeremy Cooper – multi-instrumentalist (2002–2003?)
- E. Scott Yates – unknown instruments, arrangements (2002)
- Sam Mickens – guitars, keyboards, percussion, electronics, backing vocals, arrangements (live; 2004–2006, studio; 2005–2008, 2010)
- Rebecca Carlisle-Healy – backing vocals, keyboards, glockenspiel (2004–2005)
- Kitty Jenson – backing vocals (~2003–2004)
- Rachael Jenson – keyboards, glockenspiel, violin, backing vocals, percussion (2006–2011)
- Matt Carlson – keyboards, guitars, backing vocals, arrangements, production (2006–2010)
- Brenna Murphy – percussion, keyboards (2006)
- Eddy Crichton – drums, percussion, keyboards, guitars (2006–2010)
- Freddy Ruppert – keyboards, electronic percussion, electronics (2010–2011)

== Slender Means Society ==
Slender Means Society
- Founded: 2004
- Founder: Zac Pennington
- Genre: Pop
- Country of origin: U.S.
- Location: Portland, Oregon
- Official website: slendermeanssociety.com

Slender Means Society is an independent record label founded in 2004 by Zac Pennington, vocalist for the band Parenthetical Girls. The label's premier release was their debut, (((GRRRLS))), in 2004. The label has since released records by artists including The Blow, Final Fantasy, Thanksgiving, Lucky Dragons, Love Letter Band, The Dead Science, Xiu Xiu, PWRFL POWER, Idol Fodder, and Grouper.

=== Discography ===
- SMS000 Parenthetical Girls – (((GRRRLS)))
- SMS001 The Blow – Poor Aim: Love Songs (co-release with States Rights Records)
- SMS002 Thanksgiving – The Ghost & The Eyes with Trees in the Ground, Outside the Window (co-release with States Rights Records)
- SMS003 Lucky Dragons – Nortenas (co-release with States Rights Records)
- SMS004 Love Letter Band – This World Be My Church (co-release with States Rights Records)
- SMS005 Parenthetical Girls – Safe as Houses
- SMS006 The Dead Science – Crepuscule with the Dead Science
- SMS007 Xiu Xiu vs. Grouper – Creepshow (co-release with States Rights Records)
- SMS008 Idol Fodder – Bäbytalk (co-release with States Rights Records)
- SMS009 PWRFL POWER – PWRFL POWER
- SMS010 Parenthetical Girls – Entanglements (co-release with Tomlab)
- SMS011 Final Fantasy – Plays To Please
- SMS012a Parenthetical Girls – Privilege, pt. I: On Death & Endearments
- SMS012b Parenthetical Girls – Privilege, pt. II: The Past, Imperfect
