= Adam Forkner =

American musician

- Also known as: White Rainbow
- Origin: Monterey, California
- Genres: Psychedelic, ambient, electronic, experimental
- Labels: Kranky; Marriage; K Records; Yarn Lazer
- Website: http://www.adamclaytonforkner.com

Adam Forkner is a musician/producer.

== Discography ==
=== As Airboy Express ===
- LAST STOP BREATH ART (2018)
- Acrylic Sleep Museum (2017)
- SUNWINTER (2017)

=== As White Rainbow ===
- ZOME (2005)
- BOX (2006)
- Sun Shifts (2007)
- Sky Drips Drifts (2007)
- Prism Of Eternal Now (2007)
- New Clouds (2009)
- THRU.U LP (2014)
- 21 Exoticism ESCAP LP (2015)

=== As VVRSSNN ===
- VVRSSNN (2003)

=== With World ===
- s/t (2005)

=== With Yume Bitsu ===
- Giant Surface Music Falling to Earth Like Jewels from the Sky (1998)
- Yume Bitsu (1999)
- Auspicious Winds (2000)
- split EP w/ Andrew Reiger (2002)
- Golden Vessyl of Sound (2002)
- Dryystonian Dreamscapes (2002)
- Dryystonian Dreamscapes Volume II (2003)
- Wabi Morning (2003)

=== With Surface of Eceon/Surface of Eceyon ===
- The King Beneath the Mountain (2002)
- Dragyyn (2003)
- Tussyan Ruins (2003)
- Dragyyn (2004)

== Other projects ==
- Clear Acrylic Thought Pattern podcast
- Rob Walmart - an improvised electronic music collective
- We Like Cats - a dub-influenced collaboration with Honey Owens (Miracles Club, Valet) and Eva Salens (Inca Ore) (Defunct)

== Assault allegations ==
On February 18, 2016, Forkner's former girlfriend Christine Messersmith filed a report alleging that she and Forkner had been involved in a physical altercation three days earlier. According to LA Weekly, a Facebook post made my Messersmith asserted that “[Forkner] repeatedly beat me senseless”. Describing one of the alleged assaults, Messersmith wrote, “The attack lasted for 15 minutes; cornering me and smashing my face and body into objects and the floor, running from him from room to room until I was forced into my closet and called the police.” Accompanying her description of the attack, Messersmith posted photos of her black eyes and badly bruised body, injuries she says Forkner inflicted.

While Messersmith attempted to press charges against Forkner, the case was ultimately rejected by L.A. City Attorney's office due to “low likelihood of conviction based on the evidence”.

As a result of Messersmith's allegations, several L.A. institutions, including Dublab radio, record label Leaving Records and the 2 Wet Crew comedy group, claimed to have cut ties with Forkner. Management at Dublab confirmed in an email to L.A. Weekly that Forkner had been dropped from the programming schedule; Leaving Records issued a Facebook post publicly announcing that its White Rainbow release had been removed from its catalog, though privately remained friends with Forkner.

In an email to L.A. Weekly, 2 Wet Crew issued the following statement: “2 Wet Crew does not support domestic violence in any way and strives to make offbeat, lighthearted comedy. Any type of violence or abuse is the antithesis to our goals. Adam is no longer going to be associated with 2 Wet Crew (DJing preshow music or attending shows).”

The Portland-based States Rights label also released a statement via Twitter saying it has removed past White Rainbow releases from its catalog. “Learning that somebody I've known and called a friend for close to 20 years is abusive to women is shocking, totally sickening (spiritually and physically), and heartbreaking,” the statement read in part.

Calvin Johnson, the head of K Records, another of Forkner’s former labels, initially tweeted support for the artist but later deleted the tweet. “It was wrong to show public support in any way to Adam. I deeply regret doing so,” Johnson tweeted to another user.
