= Super Warren MMIV =

Studio album by Yacht
- Released: 2003
- Genre: Alternative; electronic; indie pop
- Length: 39:26
- Label: States Rights Records

Yacht chronology
| Super Warren MMIV (2003) | Mega (2005) |

Professional ratings
Review scores
| Source | Rating |
|---|---|
| AllMusic | 3/5 stars |
| Tiny Mix Tapes | 4.5/5 marks |

Super Warren MMIV is the debut studio album by American musical project YACHT, released via States Rights Records in 2003.

== Track listing ==
| No. | Title | Length |
|---|---|---|
| 1. | "Jonathan Bechtolt" | 0:30 |
| 2. | "SHTML" | 3:31 |
| 3. | "Remember What This Feels Like" | 4:41 |
| 4. | "I Needed a Change" | 1:52 |
| 5. | "I Asked If We Could Have Sex One Last Time" | 3:39 |
| 6. | "Bunny & Duck's Boat House" | 3:31 |
| 7. | "Do You Remember the Summer?" | 0:55 |
| 8. | "Glowing Rock, Melting Bones" | 5:14 |
| 9. | "Flying and Biting" | 0:25 |
| 10. | "I Will Bend Backwards" | 1:01 |
| 11. | "The Denver Nuggets" | 2:54 |
| 12. | "We Want Tofu" | 0:20 |
| 13. | "I'll Be Happy" | 3:14 |
| 14. | "Doctor Tunde Babs" | 2:44 |
| 15. | "From the Sky, Down" | 1:06 |
| 16. | "Lulling You" | 3:49 |
| Total length: | | 39:26 |
