= Yacht (band) =

American dance-pop band

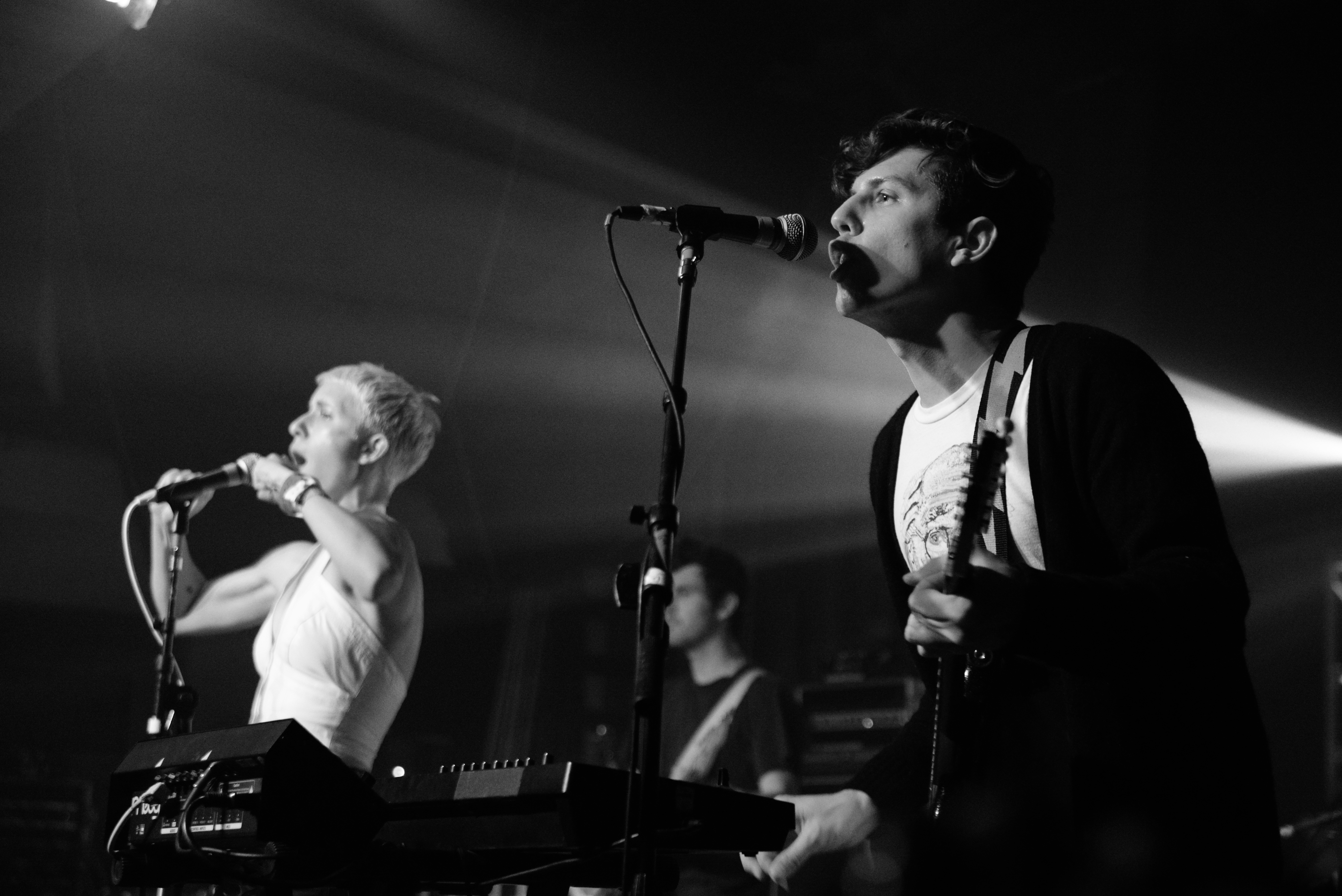
- Yacht at Treefort Music Fest in 2015

Background information
- Origin: Portland, Oregon, U.S.
- Genres: Electropop; alternative rock; dance-punk; synthpop
- Years active: 2002–present
- Labels: DFA; Downtown; Marriage; States Rights
- Members: Jona Bechtolt; Claire L. Evans
- Website: teamyacht.com

Yacht (stylized as YACHT, Y△CHT or Y▲CHT) is an American dance-pop band from Portland, Oregon, currently based in Los Angeles, California. The core group consists of Jona Bechtolt and Claire L. Evans, and when touring expands to include Bobby Birdman.

Yacht has released albums on States Rights Records, Marriage Records, DFA Records, and Downtown Records.

== History ==
=== Early history ===
Bechtolt chose the name Yacht in reference to Y.A.C.H.T., an alternative school in Portland, Oregon. Bechtolt told Spin, "It stands for Young Americans Challenging High Technology. It refers to an education program that was held in Portland, Oregon. I was enrolled when I was 16, back in 1996."

=== 2002–2007 ===
Yacht was Bechtolt's solo project from 2002 to 2008. During this period, he released three albums, Super Warren MMIV, Mega and I Believe in You. Your Magic Is Real, on record labels in the Pacific Northwest area.

In January 2006, Yacht was commissioned for two performances for the New York based art and technology platform Rhizome, as part of its Crap-tops vs Laptops show. In February 2006, Yacht performed at the Museum of Modern Art's P.S. 1 Contemporary Art Center and produced an hour-long Internet radio program with Clear Cut Press, a Northwest-based publisher of new literary work. In April 2006, the Aurora Picture Show commissioned a Yacht performance as part of its Media Archeology Festival in Houston, Texas.

For the 2007 release of I Believe in You. Your Magic Is Real by Marriage Records, Bechtolt performed a concert on an actual yacht on the Willamette River in Portland, Oregon. In October the same year, Yacht played at one of China's earliest music festivals, Yue, organised by Split Works.

Live performances during this period included dancing along to music as well as elaborate PowerPoint presentations.

=== 2008–2010 ===
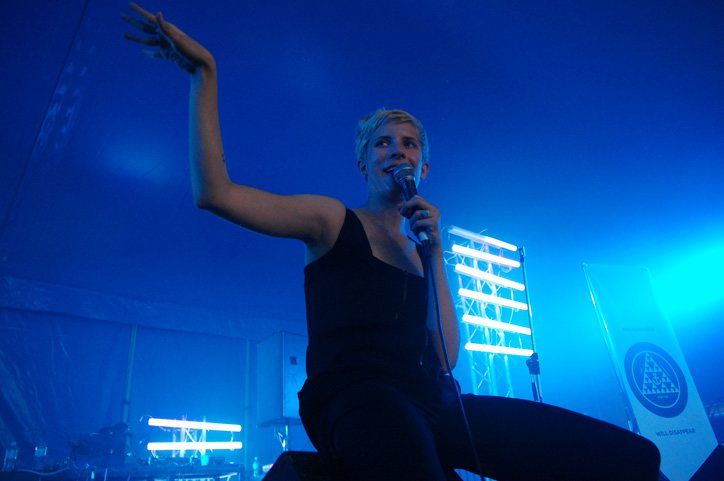
Claire L. Evans performing with Yacht in 2009

In 2008, Yacht became a duo with the introduction of longtime collaborator Claire L. Evans as a full member. She contributed vocals to many of the songs on the 2009 album See Mystery Lights, Yacht's first full-length release on DFA Records. The album cover was designed by the Texas-based artist Boyd Elder, who had previously designed album art for The Eagles. Pitchfork rated See Mystery Lights an 8.5, calling it "a triumph", and Rolling Stone wrote that Yacht "split the different between Talking Heads and electro pop, and make a breakthrough album of digital ear candy." It was chosen as a "Critic's Choice" by The New York Times critic Nate Chinen.

During this period, Yacht began publicly discussing their personal philosophy, and published a book called The Secret Teachings of the Mystery Lights: A Handbook on Overcoming Humanity and Becoming Your Own God which explained their beliefs, a list of which is maintained on their website.

In January 2010, Yacht added a live band, The Straight Gaze, consisting of the musicians Rob "Bobby Birdman" Kieswetter and Jeffrey Brodsky to their live show. This incarnation is known as Yacht and the Straight Gaze.

=== 2010–2013 ===
In November 2011, Yacht worked with the YouTuber and longtime Yacht supporter Mitchell Davis on their music video for the song "I Walked Alone".

In June 2011, Yacht released Shangri-La, their second album on DFA Records. They made a double video for its first two singles, "Utopia" and '"Dystopia (The Earth Is on Fire)", directed by the experimental filmmaker and documentary maker Rene Daalder. In 2012, they recorded "Le Goudron", a cover version of the Brigitte Fontaine song (1969). In early 2013, the retailer Kohl's used Yacht typeface imagery and lyrics from "Shangri-La" on a series of T-shirts made available online, until the band notified the company about possible legal liabilities.

In an August 2012 interview with New York Music News, Evans explained the Yacht band, business and belief system: "Yacht is the name we give to all the projects we do together. Usually that’s recording and performing music, but as we emphasize in our axiom of "band, business, and belief system," there are both materialistic and metaphysical dimensions to our work. It's full-spectrum."

In December 2012, the band celebrated its 10th anniversary by releasing the single "Second Summer". The video was produced by the Fox animation studio, Animation Domination. This song also appeared in video game The Sims 3.

In August 2013, the band released "Party at the NSA," a song satirizing the National Security Agency's unwarranted surveillance of private citizens, and donated all proceeds from sales of the song online to the Electronic Frontier Foundation. The comedian Marc Maron plays the guitar solo on the song. Yacht and the design blog Nothing Major created a T-shirt of the "Party at the NSA" artwork, of which sale proceeds were also donated to the EFF.

=== 2014–2015 ===
In 2014, Yacht signed to Downtown Records, and released an EP, "Where Does This Disco". To accompany the release, Yacht designed a limited-edition compact disc that served as commentary on the obsolescence of the medium. They discussed the project at WIRED's WIREDxDesign conference in October 2014. WIRED called the project "music not as a thing in itself, but the beginning of a chain of experiences which had no edge."

On October 16, 2015, Yacht released I Thought The Future Would Be Cooler, their first full-length album on Downtown Records. The release was preceded by a series of technological subversions, including a drone-captured video of a billboard, a website which sent fans faxes of the album artwork, and video that only played when Uber prices were surging in Los Angeles. The campaign was nominated for two Webby Awards.

=== 2016–present ===
On May 9, 2016 it was reported a sex tape with Claire Evans and Jona Bechtolt was leaked and the romantically involved couple responded by admitting to making the tape then saying they are taking some control over distribution by selling it for $5 on their website. It was later revealed that the leak of the sex tape was a hoax designed to promote the band. The duo admitted to the hoax and released a video inspired by combining a sex tape with The X-Files. The stunt was criticized by many media outlets.

Lizzie Plaugic wrote for The Verge: "By successfully getting news organizations to give coverage to this hoax, they've lent credence to the very real and persistent assumption that victims of sex crimes are doing it only for the attention." Anna Merlan from Jezebel said, "What Yacht did is troll people's innate sense of horror, disgust and compassion when confronted with a terribly violating crime. This is one of the grossest publicity stunts I've ever seen." “We have nothing but regrets about it,” Claire Evans said about the stunt in 2019. “Obviously it was a mistake."

After this incident Yacht took time off from music. They co-founded the Triforium Project, an effort to revitalize a piece of "polyphonoptic" public art in Los Angeles called the Triforium (Los Angeles). They won a major grant to reimagine the artwork with a temporary installation and a series of live performances featuring dozens of Los Angeles-based artists and musicians.

Yacht released the album Chain Tripping on August 30, 2019, using artificial intelligence processes to help compose the songs, write lyrics, and create artwork, videos, typography, and press photographs, in collaboration with artists including Ross Goodwin, Allison Parrish, Tom White, and Mario Klingemann, and machine learning researchers. The album was nominated for a GRAMMY Award for Best Immersive Audio Album.

== Band members ==
- Jona Bechtolt – vocals, programming, guitar, drums, bass guitar, percussion, claps, synthesizers, keyboards, piano, effects
- Claire L. Evans – vocals

When performing live, Yacht is accompanied by the following band members:

- Rob "Bobby Birdman" Kieswetter – vocals, bass guitar, keyboard
- Jeffrey Brodsky – drums, percussion (left band in 2015)
- Katy Davidson – guitar, keyboard, vocals (no longer with Yacht)

== Discography ==
=== Studio albums ===
- Super Warren MMIV (2004)
- Mega (2005)
- I Believe in You. Your Magic Is Real. (2007)
- See Mystery Lights (2009)
- Shangri-La (2011)
- I Thought the Future Would Be Cooler (2015)
- Chain Tripping (2019)
- Sub Versions (2021)
- New Release (2024)

=== Other releases ===
- Mike's Crest (2003) States Rights Records
- The Winter Is Coming Jam (2004) States Rights Records
- Radio Sessions (split CD with Lucky Dragons) (2004) Ultra Eczema
- We Float Around, Hang Out On Clouds (Black Label collaborative LP with Lucky Dragons) (12" split) (2005) Marriage Records
- Our Friends in Hell (August 2007) States Rights Records
- Instrumentals 2007 (December 2007) Marriage Records
- "Summer Song" (12" single) (August 2008) DFA
- Don't Put Out [Digital 45] (7" single) (cover versions of songs from Ladies and Gentlemen, the Fabulous Stains soundtrack) (June 2009) Marriage Records
- See Mystery Lights (Instrumentals) (July 2009) DFA
- Anthem of the Trinity (August 2009) States Rights Records
- "Psychic City" (7" single) (August 2009) DFA - UK Sales No. 71
- iTunes Session (February 2010) DFA
- "The Afterlife" (7" single) (May 2010) DFA
- Utopia (Remixes) (July 2011) DFA
- "Dystopia (Remixes)" (12" single) (October 2011) DFA
- Shangri-La (Instrumentals) (October 2011) DFA
- "I Walked Alone (Remixes)" (12" single) (November 2011) DFA
- Shangri-La (Remixes) (February 2012) DFA
- Le Goudron (cover version of a Brigitte Fontaine song) (April 2012) DFA
- "Second Summer" (single) (December 2012) DFA
- "Plastic Soul" (single) (January 2014) DFA
- Where Does This Disco? (September 2014) Downtown Records
- Strawberry Moon EP (October 2017)
- “They Want to Eat Your Lunch” (2021)
- “My Idea” (2022)
- “Finger In Your Eye” (2023)
- “Manic Panic” (2023)
- “Overboogie” (2023)
- “Two Heads” (2023)
- “Eve Babitz” (2024)
