= Bobby Birdman =

American musician

Robert John Kieswetter, better known by his stage name Bobby Birdman, is an American musician. Kieswetter is originally from Nevada City, California, and lives in Los Angeles, California. He has released albums on Hush Records, Not Not Fun, Fryk Beat, States Rights Records. He has played on albums by Bonnie Prince Billy, The Microphones, Yacht, Little Wings, Golden Shoulders, and VVRSSNN.

Kieswetter is a member of Yacht's backing band, The Straight Gaze. As Bobby Birdman, he has toured with Ratatat, Hot Chip, and Yacht.

== Discography ==
- 2009 New Moods (Fryk Beat Records/Gnar Tapes)
- 2008 Bust a Move - Slowest Ryhme Bobby Birdman Remix (Delicious Vinyl)
- 2006 Victory at Sea 12" (Fryk Beat Records)
- 2006 Giraffes and Jackals CD (States Rights Records)
- 2005 Giraffes and Jackals vinyl (Not Not Fun)
- 2003 Heart Caves EP (States Rights Records)
- 2002 Born Free Forever (Hush Records)
- 2001 Let Me In (Hush Records)
