= Jay Reatard discography =

- Studio albums: 2
- EPs: 4
- Compilation albums: 4
- Singles: 13

The following is the discography for American garage punk musician Jay Reatard and his associated acts.

== As Jay Reatard ==
=== Albums ===
- Blood Visions LP/CD (2006; In the Red)
- Watch Me Fall LP/CD (2009; Matador)

=== EPs ===
- Night of Broken Glass (2007; In the Red)
- In the Dark (2007; Squoodge)
- Blood Demo" (2008; Stained Circles)
- Tour Split (2009; Split with Thee Oh Sees; Shattered)

=== Singles ===
- Hammer I Miss You (2006; Goner)
- Split with the Boston Chinks (2007; P. Trash)
- I Know a Place (2007; Goner)
- See/Saw (2008; Matador)
- Painted Shut (2008; Matador)
- Always Wanting More (2008; Matador)
- Fluorescent Grey (2008; Matador)
- Trapped Here (2008; Matador)
- No Time (2008; Matador)
- Gamma Ray (2008; Split with Beck; XL Recordings)
- Hang Them All (2009; Split with Sonic Youth; Matador)
- It Ain't Gonna Save Me (2009; Matador)
- You Get No Love (2011; Shattered)

=== Compilations ===
- Singles 06-07 LP/CD/DVD (2008; In the Red)
- Matador Singles '08 LP/CD (2008; Matador)
- Greatest Messes [Digital Release] (2009; Shattered)
- Better Than Something LP (2012; Factory 25)

=== Compilation appearances ===
- We Heart The Blowtops – Tribute [Track: Venom Victims Wine] (2006; Big Neck)
- Stroke: Songs for Chris Knox - Various Artists [Track: Pull Down the Shades] (2009; Merge Records)
- In Utero, in Tribute, in Entirety – Various artists tribute to Nirvana [Track: "Frances Farmer Will Have Her Revenge on Seattle"] (2014; Robotic Empire)

=== Tribute albums ===
- A French Tribute to Jay Reatard LP (2014; Teenage Hate Records)
- Blood Visions By Retard Records & Friends LP (2015; Retard Records)
- Russian Tribute To Jay Reatard LP (2015; Krapiva Records)
- JAY REATARD - A Canadian Tribute LP (2020; Retard Records)

== With Lost Sounds ==
=== Albums ===
- Memphis Is Dead LP/CD (2001; Big Neck!)
- Black-Wave 2×LP/CD (2001; Empty)
- Rat's Brains & Microchips LP/CD (2002; Empty)
- Lost Sounds LP/CD (2004; In the Red)
- Blac Static (2011)

=== EPs ===
- Split 7-inch with The Vanishing (2003; Cochon)
- Ice Age (2004; Holy Cobra Society)
- Future Touch 12-inch EP/CDEP (2004; In the Red)

=== Singles ===
- Plastic Skin (2000; Solid Sex Lovie Doll)
- 1 + 1 = Nothing (2001; Empty)
- Motorcycle Leather Boy (2007; Tic Tac Totally)

=== Compilations ===
- Outtakes & Demos Vol. 1 CD-R (2001; Contaminated)
- Outtakes & Demos Vol. 1 LP (2002; Hate)
- Recent Transmissions: Demos & Outtakes Vol. 2 CD (2002; Contaminated)
- Demos II CD (2003; On/On Switch)
- Demos & Outtakes Vol. 2 3×7″ (2004; Rockin' Bones)
- Lost Lost Sounds, Outtakes, and Demos (2012)

== With The Reatards ==
=== Albums ===
- Teenage Hate LP/CD (1998; Goner)
- Grown Up, Fucked Up LP/CD (1999; Empty)
- Live LP (2004; Goner)
- Bedroom Disasters LP/CD (2004; Empty)
- Not Fucked Enough LP/CD/CD-R (2005; Empty/Shattered)

=== EPs ===
- Get Real Stupid (1997; Goner)
- Get Out Of Our Way (1999; Blahll!)
- Untitled (2002; SSLD)
- Monster Child (2004; Zaxxon)
- Plastic Surgery (2005; Shattered)
- Totally Shattered Euro Tour (2005; Split with Angry Angles and Tokyo Electron; Kenrock)

=== Singles ===
- Your So Lewd (1999; Empty)
- I Lie Too (2006; Zaxxon Virile Action)

== With The Final Solutions ==
=== Albums ===
- Disco Eraser LP/CD (2003; Misprint)
- Songs by Solutions LP/CD (2007; Goner)

=== EPs ===
- Eat Shit (2002; Therapeutic)
- Return To The Motherland (2006; Frick & Frack)
- FS/DF (2007; Jethrow)

=== Singles ===
- Eye Don't Like You (2005; Shit Sandwich)
- My Love Is Disappointing (2005; Shattered)

== With Nervous Patterns ==
=== Albums ===
- Nervous Patterns CD-R/CD/LP (2003/2004; Contaminated/Cochon)

=== Singles ===
- You Can't Change (2005; Zaxxon)
- Nervous Patterns/River City Tanlines split 7-inch (2012; Red Lounge)

== With Angry Angles ==
=== Albums ===
- Angry Angles (2016; Goner)

=== EPs ===
- Things Are Moving (2005; Shattered)
- Totally Shattered Euro Tour (2005; Split with Angry Angles and Tokyo Electron; Kenrock)
- Apparent-Transparent (2006; Plastic Idol)

=== Singles ===
- Crowds (2005; P. Trash)
- Angry Angles / Digital Leather split 7-inch (2006; Split with Digital Leather; Shattered)

== As Terror Visions ==
=== Albums ===
- World of Shit - Expanded edition LP (2011; [FDH Records)
- World of Shit LP/CD (2007; FDH Records)

=== EPs ===
- Endless Tunnel (Shattered)

=== Singles ===
- Blood in America (Disordered)

== With Bad Times ==
=== Albums ===
- Bad Times LP (2001; Goner/Therapeutic)
- Bad Times (Re-Release) CD (2002; Sympathy For The Record Industry)

== With Destruction Unit ==
=== Albums ===
- Self-Destruction of a Man LP/CD (2004; Empty)
- Death to the Old Flesh LP/CD (2006; Empty)
