= Planet of the Wolves =

Studio album by Guitar Wolf
- Released: Japan, 21 September 1997; US, 21 October 1997
- Recorded: 1996–1997
- Genre: Garage punk; noise punk; blues punk
- Length: 37:04
- Label: Ki/oon Music (Japan); KSC2 190; Matador Records (US); Ole 248-2
- Producer: Guitar Wolf

Guitar Wolf chronology
Missile Me! (1995)	Planet of the Wolves (1997)	Jet Generation (1999)

Planet of the Wolves is the fifth studio album by Japanese rock band Guitar Wolf. It was released in Japan on 21 September 1997 and in the United States on 21 October 1997. It features covers of the Rolling Stones' "(I Can't Get No) Satisfaction", Link Wray's "Rumble", the Oblivians' "Motor Cycle Leather Boy", and Teengenerate's "Let's Get Hurt", along with yet another re-recording of "All Through the Night Buttobase!!", other versions of which had appeared on the band's earlier albums Kung Fu Ramone and Run Wolf Run.

== Track listing ==
All tracks by Guitar Wolf, except where indicated.

1. "Kawasaki ZII750 Rock N' Roll" – 2:01
2. "Planet of the Wolves" – 2:34
3. "Invader Ace" – 3:19
4. "Motor Cycle Leather Boy" (Oblivians) – 2:22
5. "Far East Man" – 2:30
6. "Wild Zero" – 3:46
7. "Planet Heart" – 2:42
8. "Energy Joe" – 1:44
9. "Jett Love" – 2:01
10. "(I Can't Get No) Satisfaction" (Jagger, Richards) – 3:32
11. "Kung Fu Ramone's Passion" – 1:51
12. "Let's Get Hurt" (Teengenerate) – 2:53
13. "All Through the Night Buttobase!!" (translation: Roaring All Through the Night!!) – 1:58
14. "Rumble" – (Grant, Wray) – 3:34
15. "Red Rockabilly" – 3:38 (Bonus on Japanese edition)

== Reception ==
Professional ratings
Review scores
Source	Rating
Allmusic	link
City Pages	Positive link

Allmusic praised the record for its energy, describing "vocal and musical delivery that makes perfect sense from the land of the Boredoms", as well as the band's "frenetic" rhythm section and frontman Seiji's distinctive vocal and guitar style. City Pages lauded the album for its "repellent fervor" but cited the slower numbers, such as "Planet Heart" and a mostly faithful cover of "I Can't Get No Satisfaction", as potential drawbacks.

In the September 2007 issue of Rolling Stone's local Japanese edition, Planet of the Wolves was ranked 51st on a list of the "100 Greatest Japanese Rock Albums".

== Personnel ==
- Seiji – guitar, vocals
- Billy – bass
- Tōru – drums
