= So Cow =

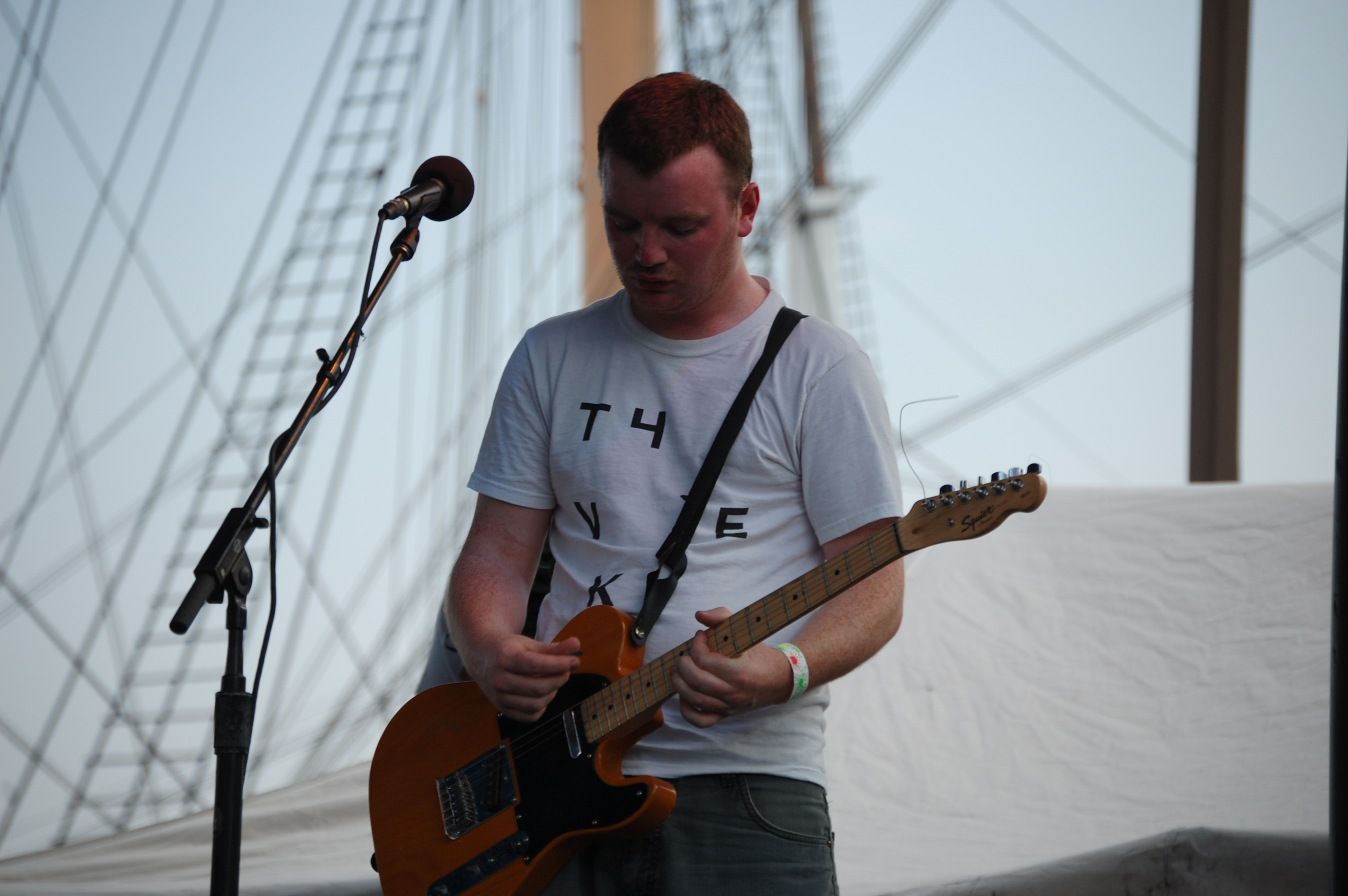
- So Cow performing at the Seaport Music Festival, 2010.

Background information
- Origin: Tuam, Ireland
- Genres: Garage rock, indie rock, punk rock, pop
- Years active: 2005–present
- Labels: Goner Records, Tic Tac Totally, Rusted Rail, Jigsaw Records, Tall Pat Records, Lost Sounds Tapes
- Website: https://socowmusic.com/

So Cow are an indie rock band from County Galway, Ireland. It was started as the recording project of Brian Kelly in 2005 in Seoul, South Korea. The group evolved into a three piece band with Jonny White on bass and Peter O'Shea on drums for 2014's The Long Con, released on Goner Records, as well as 2012's Out Of Season split album with Squarehead.

The band have appeared at Primavera Sound, SXSW & Castlepalooza. Their sound has been described by Pitchfork as "Like Television Personalities or The Clean at their most engaging, Kelly plays rickety guitar-pop that sounds homemade without feeling insular." The group received media attention in 2009 in South Korea after naming a song after the popular South Korean actress and model Moon Geun-young.

== Career ==
Kelly started So Cow while working as a teacher in South Korea. After releasing his debut EP Best Vacation Ever on the independent Irish label Rusted Rail in 2006, Kelly self-released the albums These Truly Are End Times in 2007 and I'm Siding With My Captors in 2008. Tracks from the EP and albums were released as the compilation album So Cow by Tic Tac Totally in 2009. Pitchfork wrote that the album was: "full of sing-along hooks and scruffy charm." and gave it a score of 7.7/10. On September 6th, 2014, So Cow released their fourth album The Long Con on Goner Records. The album, which was produced by Greg Saunier, received positive reviews from critics. Writing for PopMatters, Matthew Fiander wrote: "So Cow emerges on The Long Con as a fresh new voice in rock music, and the band has a sound that is inherently dynamic and doesn’t need to sit still." Writing for Allmusic, Mark Deming wrote: "Kelly is a gifted songwriter, a strong and impassioned singer, and a guy with a rough but potent guitar attack..." Blurt reviewer Tim Henly opined: "This stuff is noisy and hooky though the band never goes for the obvious hook, in fact, some of the guitar playing is downright amateurish in the best way possible." So Cow's fifth album Lisa Marie Airplane Tour was released on September 6, 2016, by US label Jigsaw Records. It was Bandcamp's "Album of the Day" on September 28 of that year, with the website writing that the album: "captures the disorientation that accompanies emotional and physical dislocation." It was The Irish Times' "New Release of the Week" on September 30, with music journalist Niall Byrne commenting: "If you like noisy guitar pop, with a dose of the real then So Cow's your man."

== Discography ==
=== Albums ===
- These Truly Are End Times (2007) Self Released CD
- I'm Siding With My Captors (2008) Self Released CD
- Meaningless Friendly (2010) Tic Tac Totally
- The Long Con (2014) Goner Records.
- Lisa Marie Airplane Tour (2016) Jigsaw Records / Tall Pat Records / Lost Sounds Tapes
- Do Re Mi Fa So Cow (2019) Self Released - CD/Cass
- But What Has That Done To The Scores? (2020) Self Released - Digital
- Bisignis (2021) Self Released - CD/Cass, Digital
- Rebel Bishop (2025) Self Released - CDr with Booklet, Digital

=== Live Albums ===
- Live Outside (2020) Self Released - Digital

=== Singles, EP's & Splits ===
- Best Vacation Ever! EP (2006) Rusted Rail
- Moon Geun Young 7" (2007) Almost Ready Records
- Commuting 7" (2008) Going Underground Records
- Ain't No Fun 7" (2010) Tic Tac Totally
- GMT EP (2011) Ride The Snake Records
- Out Of Season (2012) Inflated Records - Split album with Squarehead
- Visa Waiver 7" (2013) Boston Pizza Records - Split single with Image Makers
- Jesus Meets The Women EP (2024) Self Released - Digital
- Affected Services EP (2024) Self Released - Digital
- H54EP (2025) Self Released - Digital

=== Compilation ===
- So Cow (2009) Tic Tac Totally
