= Wheels on Fire =

Wheels on Fire may refer to:

- "This Wheel's on Fire" (song), a song by Bob Dylan and Rick Danko
- Wheels on Fire (band), an American rock band
- This Wheel's on Fire: Levon Helm and the Story of The Band, the autobiography of musician Levon Helm
- "Wheels on Fire," a song by The Magic Numbers from their 2005 album The Magic Numbers
- Wheels on Fire, an Amiga game

== See also ==
- Wheels of Fire
