= Taxi (disambiguation) =

A taxi or taxicab is a vehicle for hire with a driver.

Taxi may also refer to:

== Film and TV ==
=== Luc Besson's Taxi franchise ===
- Taxi (film series), French action-comedy movies
  - Taxi (1998 film), a 1998 film directed by Gérard Pirès
  - Taxi 2, a 2000 sequel to the above film, directed by Gérard Krawczyk
  - Taxi 3, a 2003 sequel to the above films, directed by Gérard Krawczyk
  - Taxi 4, a 2007 sequel to the above films, directed by Gérard Krawczyk
  - Taxi 5, a 2018 sequel to the above films, directed by Frank Gastambide
- Taxi (2004 film), American remake of the 1998 film, directed by Tim Story
- Taxi Brooklyn, a French-American television series inspired by the French Taxi film franchise

=== Film ===
- Taxi!, a 1932 film starring James Cagney
- Taxi (1953 film), a 1953 American film starring Dan Dailey
- Taxi!, a 1970 South African film starring Tony Jay
- Taxi!!!, a 1978 made-for-TV drama
- Taxi (1996 film), a 1996 Spanish film directed by Carlos Saura
- Taxi (2015 film), a 2015 Iranian film, directed by Jafar Panahi which is also known as Taxi Tehran

=== Television ===
- Taxi (TV series), an American sitcom that originally aired from 1978 to 1983
- Taxi! (British TV series), a British comedy-drama series with Sid James (1963–64)
- "Taxi" (Bluey), a 2018 episode
- "Taxi" (Soupy Norman), a 2007 episode
- Live Talk Show Taxi, also known as TAXI, a South Korean talk show

== Music ==
- Taxi (Romanian band), a Romanian pop band
- Taxi (Portuguese band), a Portuguese rock band
- Taxi (Gibraltar band), a Gibraltarian pop rock band

=== Albums ===
- Taxi (Bryan Ferry album), a 1993 album by Bryan Ferry
- Taxi (Nikos Karvelas album), 1983

=== Songs ===
- "Taxi" (Harry Chapin song), 1972
- "Taxi" (Sunny Girls song), 2016
- "Taxi" (Jo Yu-ri song), 2023
- "Taxi", a 1983 song by J. Blackfoot
- "Taxi", a 2020 song by the Nova Twins
- "Taxi Cab", a song by American musical duo Twenty One Pilots
- "Taxi Cab", a song by Vampire Weekend from their 2010 album Contra
- "El Taxi", a song by Pitbull from the 2015 album Dale
- "Taxi" an unreleased song by Charli XCX from the leaked album known as XCX World

== Other uses ==
- TAXI (advertising agency), an advertising agency which is part of VMLY&R
- Taxi (book), a 2007 collection of stories by the Egyptian writer Khaled al-Khamissi
- Taxi (chocolate), a chocolate biscuit
- Taxi (pinball), a pinball machine
- Taxiing, moving an aircraft on the ground under its own power

== See also ==
- Taxi Driver (disambiguation)
- Taxi Taxi (disambiguation)
- Taxicab geometry
- Taxicab number
- Taxis, in biology, is a behavioural response
- Taxis, in rhetoric, see Dispositio
- Thurn und Taxis, German princely family, key player in the postal services of 16th-century Europe
- Rádio Táxi, a pop rock band from Brazil
