= Guitar Wolf =

Japanese rock band

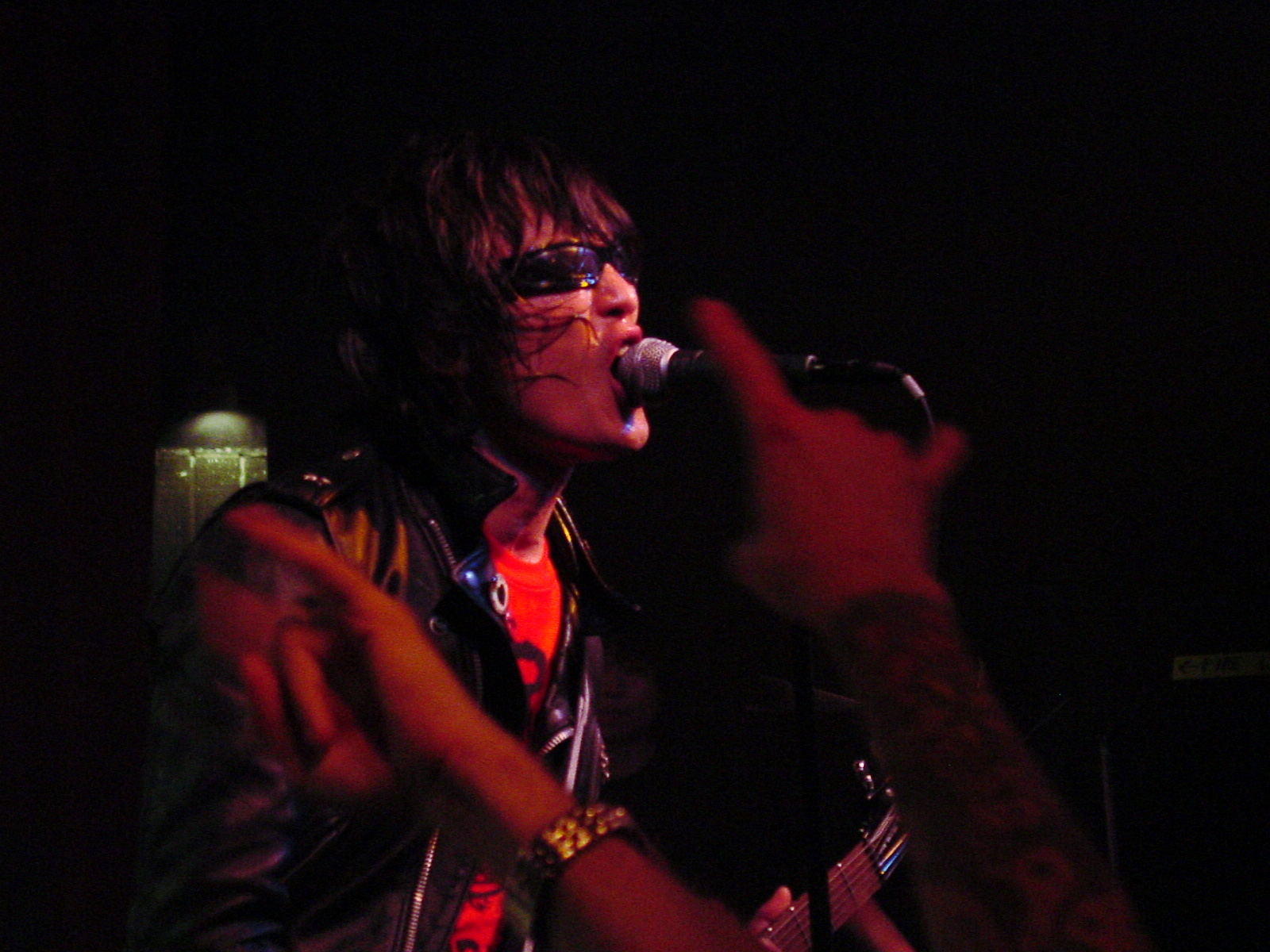
- Seiji of Guitar Wolf performing in 2005

Background information
- Origin: Harajuku, Tokyo, Japan
- Genres: Garage rock; hard rock; noise rock; garage punk; punk blues
- Years active: 1987–present
- Labels: Guitarwolf; Sony JP; Ki/oon; Goner; Matador; Narnack; Okami; Third Man
- Members: Seiji; Gotz; Takuro
- Past members: Narita; Masaharu; Tōru; Billy; U.G; Hikaru; Shingo
- Website: guitarwolf.net

Guitar Wolf (Japanese: ギ タ ー ウ ル フ) is a Japanese garage rock power trio founded in Tokyo in 1987. They coined the phrase "jet rock 'n' roll", which they use to describe their musical style. The band is signed to Sony Music Japan's Ki/oon Records division.

Guitar Wolf has released thirteen studio albums internationally as well as a live album, numerous singles, and a retrospective compilation called Golden Black. The band members have also been featured in two B-grade science fiction horror films: Wild Zero and Sore Losers. A collection of Guitar Wolf's most popular videos and live performances have been compiled into a limited-edition DVD titled Red Idol.

== History ==
=== Formation ===
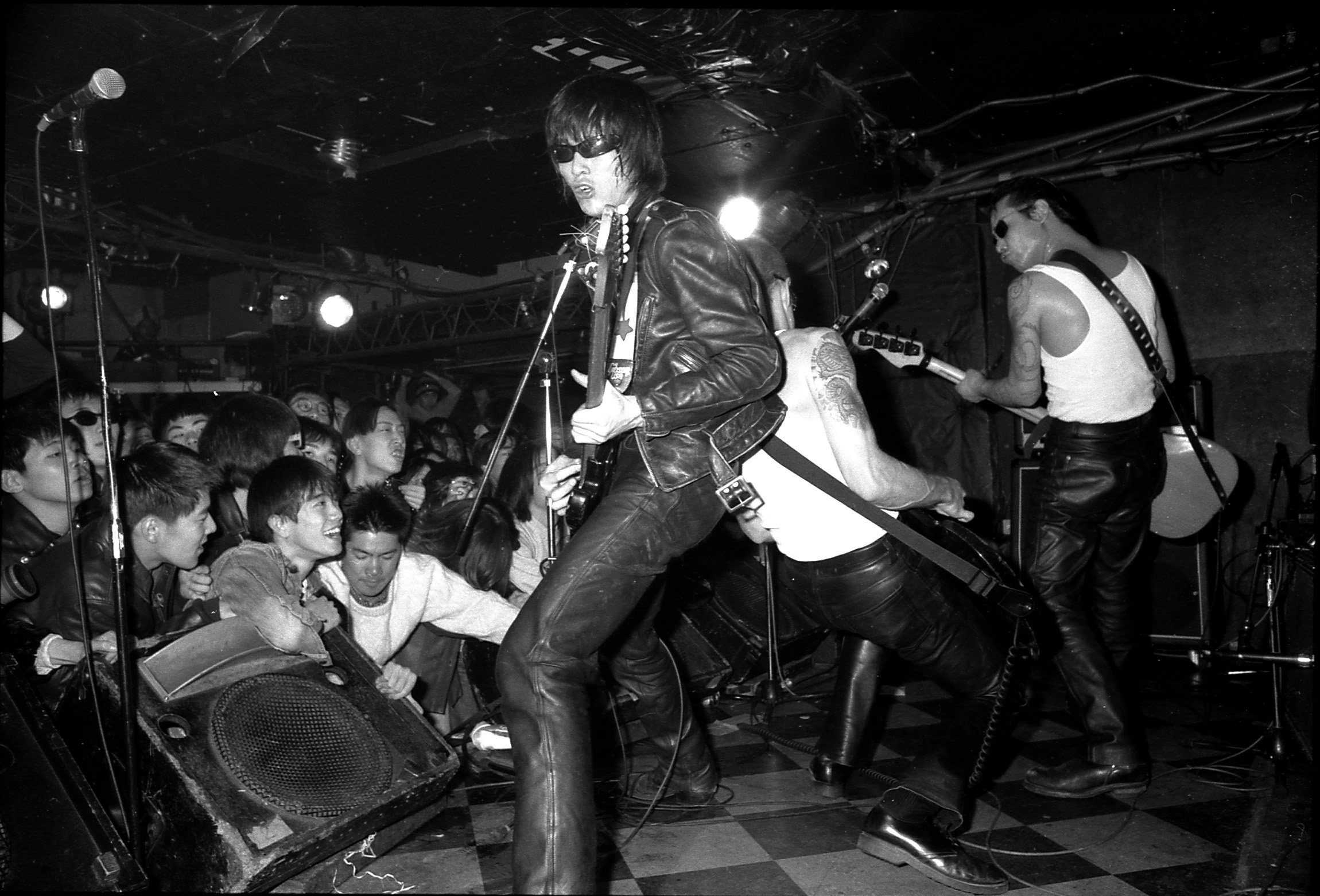
Guitar Wolf performing in 1995

Guitarist Seiji was born in Nagasaki Prefecture but moved to nearby Shimane Prefecture while he was still young. Upon graduating high school, he moved to Tokyo, where he became lead vocalist for the band Far East Punch. With a strong desire to play guitar, Seiji dedicated himself to the instrument after coming across a copy of the single "Rumble" by Link Wray & His Ray Men at Tower Records in Shibuya. He has stated that the 1958 instrumental "saved his music life".

Seiji met bassist Billy (Hideaki Sekiguchi) while the two were working in Harajuku. Realizing they shared similar musical tastes, they decided to form a rock band together. After convincing Seiji's coworker Narita to accompany them on drums, Guitar Wolf formed in Harajuku in 1987. Each member adopted a Ramones-style surname reflecting the instrument he played: Seiji became Guitar Wolf, Billy became Bass Wolf, and Narita became Drum Wolf, though Narita would depart the group shortly thereafter. For a brief period, Seiji's younger brother Masaharu filled in on drums before a drummer, Tōru, was found.

In time, the band would come to develop its own unique strain of punk rock music, fusing multiple genres together into what the band described as Jet Rock 'n' Roll. Although Guitar Wolf has cited Joan Jett as an important musical and stylistic influence, contrary to some reports, the term Jet Rock is not derived from Joan Jett's name. The term's origin is, rather, attributed to the sound of a jet plane. In an interview conducted in St. Louis on 5 April 2012, Seiji clarified: "I love jet plane. I love noisy music, too. So...there were records...many records...every record have no big sounds. So...easy to listen. I hate that! So! I add jet sounds. Bwaaaahng! Explosion!" In the same interview, when asked who created the term Jet Rock, Seiji replied, "Me. Yeah, yeah. So we are #1 Japanese Jet Rock Band".

=== First releases ===
By 1994, the band had released three albums and a single. Their first album, Wolf Rock!, was recorded in Seiji's basement and released in the US on vinyl by Goner Records. Their second album, Kung Fu Ramone, was released through Bag of Hammers; their third, titled Run Wolf Run, contains a number of re-recorded tracks from Kung Fu Ramone. 1994 also saw the release of their first single, "Somethin' Else b/w Red Rockabilly", again through Bag of Hammers.

=== Later work ===
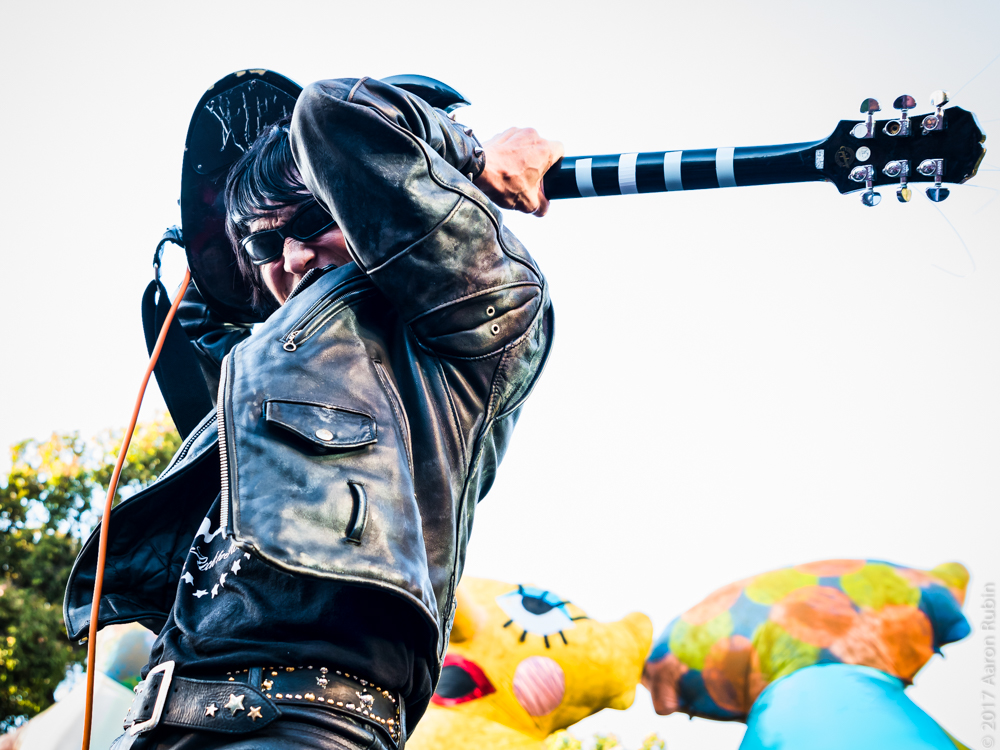
Guitar Wolf at Burger Boogaloo, Mosswood Park, Oakland, 2017

The period between 1994 and 2000 is when Guitar Wolf released much of their best-known material. In 1996, a performance at a New York City record store secured the band a contract with Matador Records, who issued their fourth album, Missile Me!, that same year. Guitar Wolf would continue releasing albums with Matador until 1999's Jet Generation, an album that the company claimed was the loudest ever put to wax, and which included a warning that playing it could potentially damage the listener's audio equipment.

On 24 April 2019, it was announced that Guitar Wolf's latest album, Love & Jett, would be released on Jack White's Third Man Records on 10 May 2019. A US tour with Nashville Pussy was organized to promote the album. In 2022, longtime drummer Toru announced his departure from the band, and his last live performance with Guitar Wolf on 11 March was live-streamed. A drummer named Shingo filled in for a May and June European tour. After the completion of the tour, the band announced Takuro Nagashima as their new drummer.

=== Film appearances ===
In 2000, Guitar Wolf starred in the Japanese rock 'n' roll "zombie horror" movie Wild Zero, directed by Tetsuro Takeuchi. The band play themselves as they take on crazed fans, zombies, and an alien invasion. Their music also features heavily in the movie's soundtrack. A sequel, titled Wild Zero 2: The Strongest Blood of Humanity, was announced in July 2019, though no release date has been confirmed as they search for a distributor. The band has also appeared in the documentaries Get Action!! (2014, dir. Jun'ya Kondō) and Garage Rockin' Craze (2017, dir. Mario Cuzic), the former exploring another well-known Japanese garage rock band, Teengenerate, and the latter looking at the formation and evolution of the Tokyo garage punk scene and its de facto founder, DJ Daddy-O-Nov. Both films feature interviews with Seiji and the latter features live footage as well.

=== Death of Bass Wolf ===
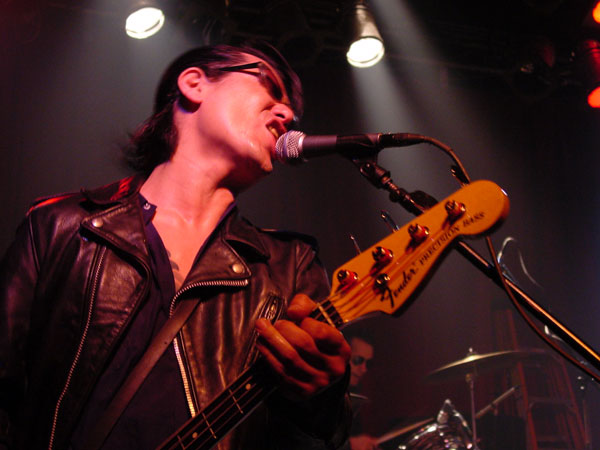
Billy (Bass Wolf) performing at Exit/In during the final leg of Guitar Wolf's 2005 U.S. tour

In 2002, the band made the move to Narnack Records, where they continued to release material until 2005. That year, they released the greatest hits album Golden Black. Later the same year, after completing a U.S. tour, the band returned to Japan, where bassist Billy suffered a fatal heart attack at the age of 38. In September 2005, Guitar Wolf played their first show with a new bassist, U.G, who would go on to play with the band for the next twelve years, departing in 2017. His replacement, Hikaru, remained with Guitar Wolf for less than a year, before being replaced by current bassist, Gotz.

== Jet clothing ==
The band have their own line of clothing, called Jet, consisting of jackets, pants, T-shirts, and belts. The Guitar Wolf motorcycle jacket, a variation of the 613 Perfecto called 613GW, is manufactured by Schott NYC. In 2018, alongside big name Japanese bands The Cro-Magnons, The Bawdies, and Stompin' Riffraffs, Guitar Wolf headlined Wings, Wheels, & Rock 'N' Roll, a show sponsored by British motorcycle jacket maker Lewis Leathers to commemorate the brand opening a Tokyo store. They have since released a model for Guitar Wolf, known as the 723 Memphis.

== Band members ==
Current

- Seiji – guitar, lead vocals (1987–present)
- Gotz – bass, backing vocals (2018–present)
- Takuro – drums (2022–present)

Past

- Narita – drums (1987)
- Masaharu – drums (1987–1991)
- Billy – bass, backing vocals (1987–2005)
- U.G – bass, backing vocals (2005–2017)
- Hikaru – bass, backing vocals (2017–2018)
- Toru – drums (1991–2022)
- Shingo – drums (2022)

Timeline

== Discography ==
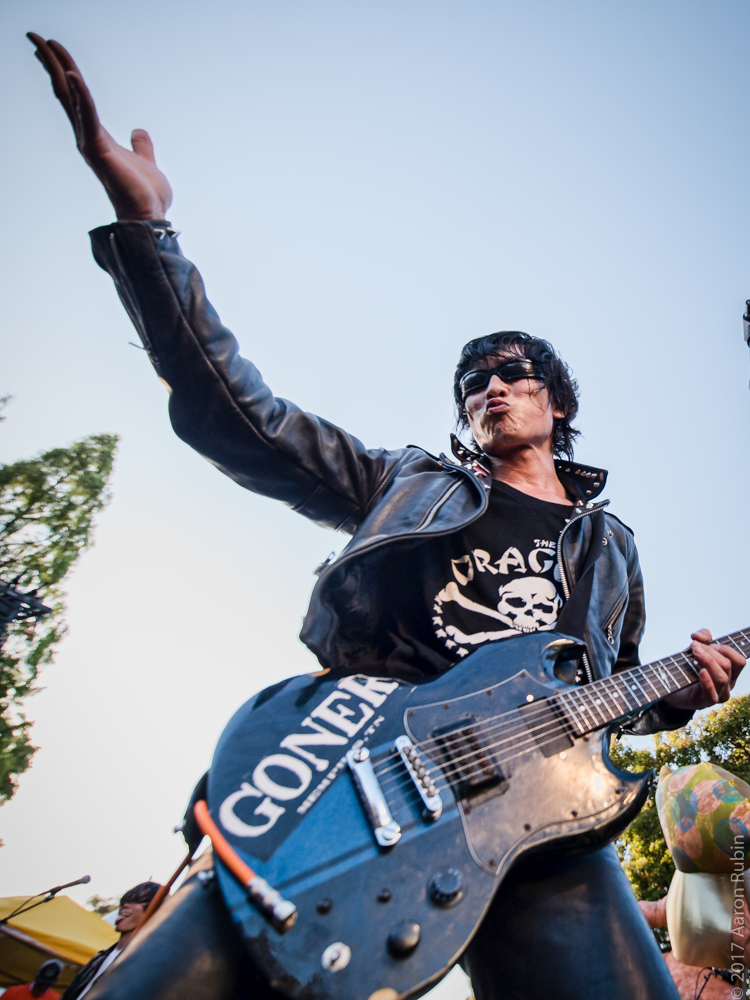
Guitar Wolf at Burger Boogaloo, Mosswood Park, Oakland, 2017

=== Studio albums ===
- Wolf Rock! (1993)
- Kung Fu Ramone (1994)
- Run Wolf Run (1994)
- Missile Me! (1995)
- Planet of the Wolves (1997)
- Jet Generation (1999)
- Rock'n'roll Etiquette (2000)
- UFO Romantics (2002)
- Loverock (2004)
- Dead Rock (2007)
- Mars Twist (2007)
- Spacebattleshiplove (2010)
- Beast Vibrator (2013)
- T-Rex from a Tiny Space Yojouhan (2016)
- Love & Jett (2019)
- More Jet (2026)

=== EPs ===
- Kannana Fever (1998)
- Kaminari One (1998)
- Rock De Korose! (1999)
- GodSpeedYou!! (2000)
- Jet Satisfaction (2009)

=== Live albums ===
- Live!! (2000)

=== Compilations ===
- Golden Black (2005)

=== Soundtracks ===
- Wild Zero (1999)

=== Splits ===
- Split 7" with the Statics (1997)
- Aussie Tour Split 7" with Shutdown 66 (1999)
- Split 7" with Sludgefeast (2005)
- Ultra Cross Vol. 1 with Lightning Bolt (2006)
- Ultra Cross Vol. 2 with Struggle for Pride (2006)
- Ultra Cross Vol. 3 with DJ Baku (2006)

=== Singles ===
- "Somethin' Else" (1995)
- "Missile Me" (1996)
- "Satisfaction" (1996)
- "Can-Nana Fever" (1997)
- "Bad Reputation" (1997)
- "Kawasaki Z11 7750 Rock 'N' Roll" (1997)
- "Kaminari One" (1998)
- "Murder By Rock!" (1999)
- "God Speed You" (2000)
- "I Love You, Ok" (2001)
- "Jet Satisfaction" (2009)

=== DVDs ===
- Red Idol (2003)
- Hero the Wolves Movie and Music to Mangle Your Mind (1999)
- Live at the World Rising of the Wolves (2005)
- 69 Comeback Special at Hibiya Yagai Dai Ongakudo 2009.4.4 (2005)

== Filmography ==
- The Sore Losers (1997) as "Mysterious Strangers"
- Wild Zero (2000) as themselves
- Guitar Wolf – Red Idol (2003) as themselves
- Rock 'n Tokyo (2007) as themselves
- Get Action!! (2014) as themselves
- Garage Rockin' Craze (2017) as themselves
