= Tic Tac Totally =

American record label

- Founded: 2006
- Founder: Matt Clark
- Distributor: Revolver/Midheaven
- Genre: Garage rock
- Country of origin: U.S.
- Location: Chicago, Illinois
- Official website: www.tictactotally.com

Tic Tac Totally was an independent record label run by Matt Clark in Chicago, Illinois. He also runs the "Dumb Audio" zine. Since forming in 2006 Tic Tac Totally has released over 50 records.

The label has released LPs and 7"s by punk and garage rock bands such as the Wavves, Lost Sounds, The Pharmacy, and Fergus & Geronimo. The label has helped launch the careers of bands such as Fat Possum recording artists Thomas Function and Wavves, Dirtnap Records recording artist The Hussy, as well as helping established artists such as the Jay Reatard led project Lost Sounds. They also have been a strong supporter of ex-River City Tanlines member Matthew Melton and his many solo and side-projects, and have released many of Alicja Trout's bands outside of River City Tanlines with her Lost Sounds, Black Sunday and Mouserocket projects.

The label continues to release garage-punk and have sparked the career of Bad Sports' member Orville Neeley's new project, OBN III's. They were featured on the cover of the popular zine Maximum Rock N Roll with a full interview.

Before that, Tic Tac Totally helped launch the career of Ireland's So Cow who Pitchfork Media reviewed favorably stating, "Like Television Personalities or the Clean at their most engaging, Kelly plays rickety guitar-pop that sounds homemade without feeling insular. So Cow compiles the best of Kelly's singles and self-released CDs so far, remastered by underground rock luminary Bob Weston. Sing-along hooks and scruffy charm abound." Tic Tac Totally is distributed by the popular punk distributor Revolver/Midheaven Distribution based in San Francisco.

== Discography ==
- Monsters from Mars, Surfing Through A Creepy Castle 7" (TTT-001)
- Black Sunday, Cut Out! 7" (TTT-002)
- Thomas Function, The Insignificants 7" (TTT-003)
- The Indecision Alarm, The Indecision Alarm CD (TTT-004)
- The Pharmacy, Abominable 7" (TTT-005)
- Digital Leather, Hard At Work LP (TTT-008)
- Cococoma/Hipshakes, Tour Split 7" (TTT-009)
- Black Sunday/Jonathan Reilly, Untitled 12" (TTT-010)
- Lost Sounds, Motocycle Leather Boy 7" (Oblivians Covers) (TTT-011)
- Snake Flower 2, Talking About It 7" (TTT-012)
- Snake Flower 2, Renegade Daydream LP/CD (TTT-013)
- Mouserocket, Pretty Loud LP (TTT-014)
- Yokohama Hooks, Turn On 7" (TTT-015)
- Lover!, I'm Not A Gnome 7" (TTT-016)
- Matt K. Shrugg, We Can Just Lie 7" (TTT-017)
- Wavves, Beach Demon 7" (TTT-018)
- So Cow, So Cow LP (TTT-019)
- Static Static, Psychic Eyes LP (TTT-020)
- Test Patterns, Blackout 12" (TTT-021)
- Moonhearts, Drop In Drop Out 7" (TTT-022)
- Lenguas Largas, I Feel 7" (TTT-023)
- Buzzer, Teacher's Pet 7" (TTT-024)
- Bare Wires, Artificial Clouds LP (TTT-025)
- Caballo Tripode, Horror Vacui LP (TTT-026)
- Meercaz, Meercaz LP (TTT-027)
- Venereans, Future Primitive LP (TTT-028)
- Legendary Wings, Questions 7" (TTT-029)
- Fergus & Geronimo, Blind Muslim Girl 7" (TTT-030)
- Primitive Hands, Split Mind 7", (TTT-031)
- Le Face, Le Face 12", (TTT-032)
- Shanks, Backstabber 7" (TTT-033)
- Day Creeper, Blah! 7", (TTT-034)
- Unwed Teenage Mothers, If That's Love EP 7", (TTT-036)
- Matt K. Shrugg, Gone Ashtray LP, (TTT-037)
- Girls At Dawn, Back To You 7", (TTT-038)
- Meercaz, Space Hate LP, (TTT-039)
- So Cow, Meaningless Friendly LP, (TTT-040)
- Andy Human, Toy Man, (TTT-042)
- OBN III's, OBN III's 7", (TTT-043)
- Lenguas Largas, Lenguas Largas LP, (TTT-044)
- Dreamdate, Melody Walk LP, (TTT-045)
- Burning Itch, Burning Itch LP, (TTT-046)
- Useless Eaters, Cheap Talk LP, (TTT-047)
- Matt K. Shrugg, "We Were D.O.A. 7"" (TTT-048)
- Useless Eaters, Daily Commute LP (TTT-049)
- OBN III's. Mark On You 7" (TTT-050)
- Wax Museums, Zoo Full Of Ramones LP (TTT-051)
- OBN III's, "The One And Only LP (TTT-052)
- Feral Beat, Feral Beat 7" (TTT-053)
- The Hussy, Weed Seizure LP (TTT-056)
- Day Creeper, Hell is Real LP (TTT-064)
- Church Of My Love, "S/T 12"" (TTT-087)
- Moonhearts "Moonhearts" LP (TTT-666)

== See also ==
- List of record labels
