= Jet Generation =

Studio album by Guitar Wolf
- Released: Japan, 21 January 1999; U.S., 22 June 1999
- Recorded: 1998–1999
- Genres: Garage punk; noise punk; blues punk
- Length: 36:17
- Labels: Ki/oon (Japan); KSC2 259; Matador (U.S); Ole 331-2
- Producer: Guitar Wolf

Guitar Wolf chronology
Planet of the Wolves (1997)	Jet Generation (1999)	Rock'n'roll Etiquette (2000)

Professional ratings
Review scores
Source	Rating
AllMusic	4/5 stars
Robert Christgau	(1-star Honorable Mention)

Jet Generation is the sixth studio album by Japanese rock band Guitar Wolf. It was released in Japan on 21 January 1999 and in the U.S. on 22 June 1999.

The album is labeled with a disclaimer sticker that semi-humorously states, "Warning: this is the loudest album ever recorded. Playing at normal volume may cause irreparable damage to stereo equipment. Use at your own risk". It includes a cover of Eddie Cochran's "Summertime Blues" and a re-recorded version of "Can-Nana Fever", which the band had originally included on their 1995 album, Missile Me!

== Critical reception ==
Exclaim! wrote that "while so many other great bands dry up or go soft over time, it's great to hear Guitar Wolf pounding it out like it's still their first rehearsal". The Village Voice declared that "Guitar Wolf are a regular (albeit mildly psychotic) guitar-bass-drums rock band, who excel at the most primal sort of no-frills trash-rock". CMJ New Music Report deemed the album "raw, rebellious and sonically nihilistic".

== Track listing ==
1. "Jet Generation"
2. "Fujiyama Attack"
3. "Kaminari One" (Jet Version) (Thunder/Lightning One)
4. "Kung Fu Ramone"
5. "Teenage U.F.O."
6. "Cosmic Space Girl"
7. "Roaring Blood"
8. "Gakulan Rider" (Schoolboy Rider)
9. "Refrigerator Zero"
10. "Shimane Slim"
11. "Cyborg Kids"
12. "Summertime Blues"
13. "Can-Nana Fever" (Jet Version)
