= John Garris =

John Garris may refer to:

- John Garris (basketball) (born 1959), American basketball player
- John Garris (tenor) (1911–1949), German operatic tenor, pianist, and conductor
- John Garris (fl. 2000s–2010s), American guitarist and singer with the band Wheels on Fire
- John Garris (fl. 1990s–2000s), former head coach of Sam Houston Bearkats softball
