= Black-Wave =

Studio album by Lost Sounds
- Released: November 19, 2001
- Recorded: 2000–01
- Studio: People's Temple
- Genre: Synth punk; garage punk; art punk
- Length: 56:16
- Label: Empty Records
- Producer: Jay Reatard, Alicja Trout

Lost Sounds chronology
Memphis is Dead (2000)	Black-Wave (2001)	Demos & Outtakes, Vol. 1 (2001)

Black-Wave ratings
Review scores
Source	Rating
AllMusic	4/5 stars
Pitchfork	8.2/10

Black-Wave is the second studio album by American punk band Lost Sounds. It was released on November 19, 2001 by Empty Records, as their debut album with the record label, and a double album in vinyl standards.

== Background ==
Black-Wave was recorded at The People's Temple, the second floor of a warehouse close to Sun Studio. During the production, songs were written individually, with an occasional re-touch on the lyrics by other band members. The title Black-Wave is considered a nod to new wave and black metal.

On the cover art, the band is shown running through empty city streets away from an alien force, including Jay Reatard holding a keyboard.

== Released editions ==
The album was released on November 19, 2001 by Empty Records on 2xLP and CD. There are multiple versions of the vinyl that were released on the original pressing, such as purple marbled, transparent, grey marbled, blue/purple marbled, and pink marbled. There was also a limited edition with an "xerox cover," with a varying dark color.

In 2019, it would be re-released by FDH Records with a 180 gram edition "sea foam glass" edition, including a gatefold cover featuring additional art that was not including in the original pressing. Also, there are "Electric Rat" Lost Sounds posters included in the pressing that glow in the dark, which are hand-numbered and limited to 150 copies. It was re-released again in 2022 under blue marbled.

== Track listing ==
All tracks are written by Jay Reatard and Alicja Trout.

Black-Wave track listing
No.	Title	Length
1.	"Reasons to Kill"	4:44
2.	"I'm Not a Machine"	1:41
3.	"Plastic skin"	3:36
4.	"Don't Turn Around"	3:39
5.	"Do You Wanna Kill Me"	1:37
6.	"1620 Echles St."	3:27
7.	"Throw Away"	2:27
8.	"Citats Blanc"	1:22
9.	"Ocelot Rising"	5:26
10.	"I See Everything"	3:03
11.	"Dark Shadows"	3:54
12.	"Lost and Found"	1:44
13.	"Saturn Stomp"	2:17
14.	"I'm Not Me"	3:17
15.	"Die Pax"	1:53
16.	"What'd I Say"	2:01
17.	"Soon This Tomb"	3:13
18.	"Heart Felt Toys"	2:44
19.	"Walk in Line"	4:11
Total length:		56:16

== Production ==
- Recorded at People's Temple
- Overdubbed at This Ain't Easley's Studio
- Mastered at Easley McCain Recording

== Credits ==
- Bass [Fuzz Bass] – Jonas Garlan
- Cello – Jonathan Kirkscey (tracks: 6, 9)
- Cover – Lost Sounds
- Drums – Rich Crook
- Guitar, Voice, Synth, Noises – Alicja Trout
- Guitar, Voice, Synth, Violin – Jay Reatard
- Mastered By – Stuart Sikes
