= Box Elders =

American rock band

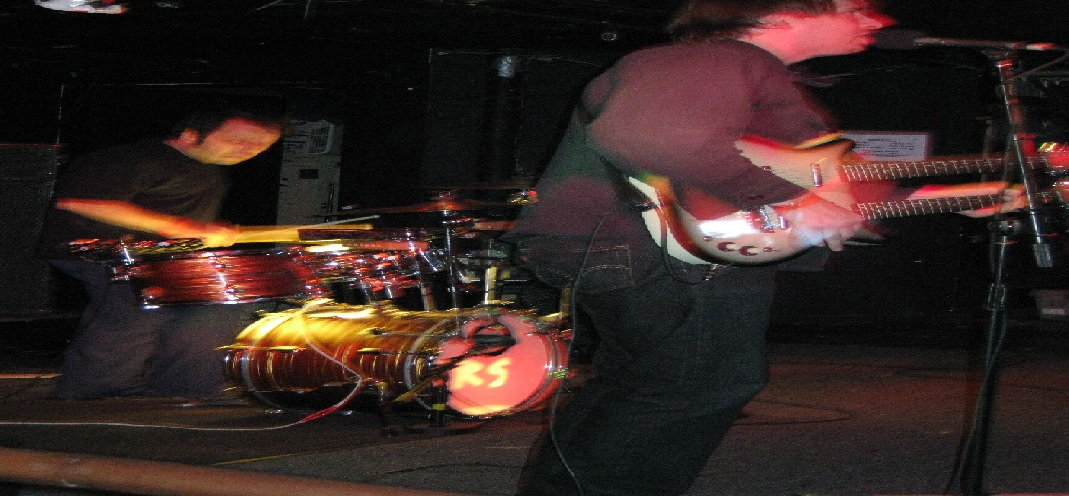
- Box Elders performing in 2010

Background information
- Origin: Omaha, Nebraska, United States
- Genres: Bubblegum pop; garage rock; punk rock
- Years active: 2005–2010
- Labels: Goner; HoZac; Burger; Grotto
- Members: Jeremiah McIntyre; Clayton McIntyre; Dave Goldberg

Box Elders, a self-described "Cave pop" band, began initially in 2005 as a goof-off project of fifteen-year-old Clayton and his twenty-nine-year-old brother Jeremiah McIntyre. The brothers' mother originally sang in the band, but soon quit. Eventually they started to play shows around Omaha, Nebraska. After seeing a free show, Dave Goldberg was enlisted to join and simultaneously play organs and drums. They spent much of 2008 and 2009 on the road before releasing their debut album Alice and Friends on August 11, 2009. The album's name comes from a vegan barbecue restaurant in Chicago of the same name. They embarked on a tour of the United States in October 2009 with labelmates Jay Reatard and Nobunny and in March 2010 with Black Lips. Box Elders began an indefinite hiatus in 2010.

== Musical style ==
The band is influenced by 1960s rock and roll, punk rock, conspiracy theories, the DIY ethic, Coast to Coast AM and the John Peel Sessions. The band is known for making short, but catchy songs about an interesting array of topics including walking ("One Foot in Front of the Other"), the end of the world ("2012"), goblins ("Alice & Friends"), a childhood hippie neighbor who hunted with Ted Nugent ("Ronald Dean") and necrophilia ("Necro").

== Band members ==
- Jeremiah McIntyre – vocals, guitar
- Clayton McIntyre – vocals, guitar
- Dave Goldberg – drums, keyboards

== Discography ==
=== Albums ===
- Alice and Friends (2009)

=== 7" singles ===
- "Box Elders 7" (2008)
- "Box Elders – Hozac Hookup Klub 7" (2010)
