= All Over Again =

All Over Again may refer to:

- "All Over Again", a 1951 song by Tommy Edwards
- "All Over Again" (Johnny Cash song), a 1958 song
- "All Over Again", a 1968 song by B.B. King from the album, His Best – The Electric B. B. King
- "All Over Again", a 1987 song by Triumph from the album, Surveillance
- "All Over Again", a 1991 song by Harem Scarem from the album, Harem Scarem
- "All Over Again", a 1995 song by Fleetwood Mac from the album, Time
- "All Over Again", a 2001 song by Kayak from the album, Night Vision
- "All Over Again", a 2002 song by Phantom Planet from the album, The Guest
- "All Over Again", a 2004 song by Estelle from the album, The 18th Day
- "All Over Again", a 2005 song by Sharon Jones & the Dap-Kings from the album, Naturally
- "All Over Again" (Ronan Keating and Kate Rusby song), 2006
- "All Over Again", a 2007 song by B5 from the album, Don't Talk, Just Listen
- "All Over Again", a 2007 song by Stanley Clarke from the album, The Toys of Men
- "All Over Again", a 2007 song by Jay Reatard from the EP, Night of Broken Glass, and featured on the compilation, Singles 06–07
- "All Over Again", a 2008 song by K.Maro from the album, Perfect Stranger
- "All Over Again", a 2011 song by Big Time Rush from the album, Elevate
- All Over Again (novel), a 2013 novel by A-dZiko Simba Gegele
- "All Over Again", a 2014 English version of the song, "De la capăt", by Voltaj
- "All Over Again", a 2017 song by Mavis Staples from the album, If All I Was Was Black
- "All Over Again", a 2019 song by Luke Combs from the album, What You See Is What You Get
