= Goner Records =

Record label based in Memphis, Tennessee

- Founded: 1993
- Founder: Eric Friedl
- Genre: Garage rock, punk, post-punk
- Country of origin: U.S.
- Location: Memphis, Tennessee
- Official website: www.goner-records.com

Goner Records is an independent record label and record store co-owned by Eric Friedl of The Oblivians and Zac Ives and based in Memphis, Tennessee. It is known for releasing albums by punk, garage rock, and more recently post-punk and synth-oriented bands, such as the King Khan & BBQ Show, Nots, Low Life, and the late Jay Reatard. The label also hosts Gonerfest, an annual Memphis music festival.

== Record label ==
The Goner Records label was started in 1993 by Eric Friedl. While attending the second Garage Shock festival, Friedl saw a performance by Japanese garage punk band Guitar Wolf, becoming a fan. After Guitar Wolf's performance, Friedl approached the band, receiving some demo cassettes in exchange for agreeing to set up some further Guitar Wolf shows in Memphis. Based on the supplied demos, Friedl decided to release Guitar Wolf's first album, Wolf Rock!, calling the band in Japan for permission. Friedl followed this first release with a number of releases by his own band, the Oblivians. Since its inception, a growing number of bands have released albums through Goner, including LPs by the Bad Times, the Oblivians, King Louie Bankston, The King Khan & BBQ Show, Digital Leather, Box Elders, Harlan T. Bobo, The Reigning Sound, Nots, and The Leather Uppers. Goner has also had a hand in releasing a multitude of 7" singles.

== Record store ==
In 2004, Friedl and business partner Zac Ives (frontman of the band The Final Solutions) purchased a record store to accompany the Goner Records label. The Goner Records store is located at 2152 Young Avenue, in Memphis, Tenn., at the former location of Legba Records, an independent music store formerly operated by Reigning Sound frontman Greg Cartwright. The store itself sells music in a variety of formats including LP, CD, 45 and 78. The store also contains a 25 cent trip through the "Elvis Impersonator Shrine."

== Goner Fest ==
In 2004, Friedl founded Goner Fest, which has become a yearly event in Memphis for showcasing Goner-related bands. The first Goner Fest was held in January 2005 and consisted of three nights of live music performed mostly at the local Buccaneer Tavern. The second Goner Fest was held just nine months later. The third Goner fest took place in 2006 at the Hi-Tone, a venue famous for housing Elvis Presley's kung fu dojo in the 1970s. Goner Records hosted Goner Fest Six September 24–27, 2009 in Memphis, which featured bands such as Cheater Slicks, Compulsive Gamblers and Reatards.

== Discography ==
- Oblivians, Impala, Impala/Oblivians split CS (0Gone)
- Guitar Wolf, Wolf Rock! LP (1Goner)
- Oblivians, Call The Shots 7" (2Gone)
- King Louie The 69th & The Harahan Crack Combo, Little Girl 7" (3Gone)
- Royal Pendletons, Smokin' 7" (4Gone)
- Magnitude 3, Melvin 7" (5Gone)
- Johnny Vomit & The Dry Heaves, Johnny Vomit & The Dry Heaves 7" (6Gone)
- John Schooley And His One Man Band, Pretty Baby 7" (7Gone)
- Reatards, Get Real Stupid 7" (8Gone)
- Gasoline, Let's Go Harley 7" (9Gone)
- Reatards, Teenage Hate LP/CD (10Gone)
- Bad Times, Bad Times LP (11Gone)
- Oblivians, On The Go LP (12Gone)
- Reatards, Live LP (13Gone)
- The Goner Records Cookbook (14Gone) - not record but a cookbook
- The King Khan & BBQ Show, The King Khan & BBQ Show LP (15Gone)
- King Louie One Man Band, Chinese Crawfish LP/CD (16Gone)
- Dutch Masters, Dutch Masters 7" (17Gone)
- Johnny Vomit & The Dry Heaves, Thanks For The Ride! 7" (18Gone)
- Harlan T. Bobo, Too Much Love LP/CD (19Gone)
- Knaughty Knights, Death Has Come Over Me 7" (20Gone)
- Reigning Sound, Live At Goner Records 6.26.05 LP/CD (21Gone)
- The Leather Uppers, Bright Lights LP/CD (22Gone)
- Jay Reatard, Hammer I Miss You 7" (23Gone)
- Cococoma, 6 1/4-125 7" (24Gone)
- Hipshakes, Not Oblivians 7" (25Gone)
- The Leather Uppers, Ok, Don't Say Hi LP (27Gone)
- Boston Chinks, Johnson Smith Company 7" (28Gone)
- The Oscars, Oscars 7" (29Gone)
- Digital Leather, She Had A Cameltoe 7" (30Gone)
- Jay Reatard, I Know a Place 7", (31Gone)
- Final Solutions, Songs by Solutions LP/CD, (32Gone)
- Harlan T. Bobo, I'm Your Man LP/CD, (33Gone)
- HEAD, Spend the Night Alone/Killed by Death 7", (34Gone)
- Carbonas, s/t LP/CD, (35Gone)
- Cococoma, s/t LP/CD, (36Gone)
- Ross Johnson, Make It Stop! CD, (37Gone)
- Crowbar, Slade vs the Monkeys Booklet, (38Gone)
- Digital Leather, "Sorcerer" LP/CD (39Gone)
- Barbaras. "Summertime Road" 7" (40Gone)
- Eddy Current Suppression Ring, "Primary Colours" LP/CD (41Gone)
- Ty Segall "Lemons" LP/CD
- Ty Segall "Melted" LP/CD

== See also ==
- List of record labels
