= Wolf Rock! =

1993 studio album by Guitar Wolf

Studio album by Guitar Wolf
- Released: U.S. 1993 (vinyl LP); Japan, July 1995 (compact disc)
- Recorded: Seiji's basement 1987–1993
- Genre: Garage punk, noise punk
- Length: 47:04
- Label: Goner Records (U.S.) (vinyl LP); GONE1; Less than TV (Japan) (compact disc); IDCW-1001
- Producer: Seiji

Guitar Wolf chronology
Wolf Rock! (1993)	Kung Fu Ramone (1994)

Wolf Rock! is the debut studio album by the Japanese rock band Guitar Wolf, released in the U.S. on vinyl in 1993 and in Japan on CD in July 1995.

== Track listing ==
Wolf Rock! track listing
No.	Title	Length
1.	"Wolf Rock"
2.	"Ace of Spades"
3.	"Indian Guitar"
4.	"Apache Leather"
5.	"Red Rockabilly"
6.	"Mars Twist"
7.	"Shooting Star Noise"
8.	"J Jupiter Joan"
9.	"Machine Gun Guitar"
10.	"Jack the Ripper"
11.	"Rumble" (Unlisted)
12.	"Gloria"
