= Wheels on Fire (band) =

American garage-pop band

Wheels On Fire
- Origin: Athens, Ohio, United States
- Genres: Garage rock, pop rock
- Years active: 2005—present
- Labels: Fat Possum Records/Big Legal Mess; Trouble in Mind Records; Kind Turkey Records; Rosa Records; Squoodge
- Members: John Garris; Michael Chaney; Susan Musser; Matthew Chaney

Wheels On Fire are an American garage-pop band formed by John Garris (guitar, vocals), Susan Musser (organ), and brothers Michael (guitar, vocals) and Matthew Chaney (drums) in Athens, Ohio, United States. They have toured the U.S. and Europe extensively and have released records on Chicago's Trouble in Mind, Mississippi's Fat Possum Records, and Germany's Alien Snatch. Currently the band has released three full-lengths and four singles.

In 2006 Alicja Trout's (Lost Sounds, Sweet Knives) River City Tanlines released a cover of an original Wheels on Fire song, "Cryin' Bleedin' Dyin', on their album I'm Your Negative. Wheels on Fire gained notoriety when Jack Oblivian of The Oblivians fame championed them and got them signed to Fat Possum records in 2008 and subsequently toured with them. Their sound has been referred to as mixing the power pop of Elvis Costello with the current garage sounds of Greg Cartwright and his The Reigning Sound outfit.

In 2014 the band's single "Bad Lie" was featured on the television show Shameless ("Iron City" Season 4, Episode 6).

== Albums ==
- Wheels On Fire CD (2006, Rosa Records)
- Get Famous LP/CD (2008, Fat Possum/Big Legal Mess)
- Liar, Liar LP/CD (2010, Alien Snatch Records - Germany)

== Singles, EPs, collections ==
- "I'm Turning Into You" 7" (Fat Possum Records)
- "Bad Lie" 7" (Trouble in Mind Records)
- Bad Lie Euro Tour Edition (Squoodge Records) - Limited to 100 copies
- Cherry Bomb EP 7" (2010, Kind Turkey Records)
- "Dead of Night" 7" (2011, Milk N' Herpes)
- God Save the Kinks (2012, Neotomic Records!)

== Videos ==
- ""Bad Lie" from the "Bad Lie" 7" on Trouble In Mind Records
