= Johnny Vomit & The Dry Heaves =

American band

- Origin: Corinth, Mississippi, United States
- Genres: Garage rock, garage punk
- Years active: Unknown — 1993
- Labels: Goner Records
- Members: Johnny Vomit; Jim Mathus; Jack Yarber

Johnny Vomit & The Dry Heaves was an American high school garage band, that formed in mid-1980s in Corinth, Mississippi, United States, that featured future leaders of the Oblivians and Squirrel Nut Zippers, Jack Oblivian (né Yarber) and Jim Mathus. Under the names Johnny Goopa (Yarber on drums) and Bart Barf (Mathus on bass), they supported Johnny Vomit on two seven-inch records issued on Eric (né Friedl) Oblivian's Goner Records.

Mathus would later appear (as a guest musician) alongside Yarber in his band South Filthy, which also featured Monsieur Jeffrey Evans, Texan-via-Chicago blues harmonicist, Walter Daniels, and Adam "Bomb" Woodard. Mathus appears on both their Sympathy for the Record Industry-released LPs.

== Seven inch singles ==
- "Johnny Vomit & The Dry Heaves" EP (Goner Records, 1993*)
- "Thanks for the Ride" (Goner Records, 2005*)

*Release dates only, recording dates unknown.
