= Taxi Driver (disambiguation) =

Taxi Driver is a 1976 Martin Scorsese film.

Taxi Driver may also refer to:

- Taxicab driver

== Film and television ==
- The Taxi Driver, a 1953 Greek comedy film directed by Yorgos Tzavellas
- Taxi Driver (1954 film), an Indian Hindi-language film directed by Chetan Anand
- Taxi Driver (1977 film), an Indian Malayalam-language film
- Taxi Driver (1978 film), an Indian Tamil-language film
- Taxi Driver: Oko Ashewo, a 2015 film starring Odunlade Adekola and Femi Jacobs
- A Taxi Driver, a 2017 South Korean film
- Taxi Driver (Israeli TV series), a 2010–2012 Israeli comedy-drama television series
- Taxi Driver (South Korean TV series), a Korean drama television series

== Music ==
- Taxi Driver (Dynamic Duo album), a 2004 album by Dynamic Duo
- Taxi Driver (Rkomi album), a 2021 album by Rkomi
- "Taxi Driver" (song), by Gym Class Heroes
- "Taxi Driver", a song by Guitar Wolf from UFO Romantics
- "Taxi Driver", a song by Hanoi Rocks from Self Destruction Blues
- "Taxi Driver", a reggae song by Steel Pulse
- "Taxi Driver", an afrobeat song by Amerado
- "Taxi Driver, a song by Sienna Spiro

== Other ==
- Taxi Driver (collection), a fashion collection by Alexander McQueen
