= Live! (Guitar Wolf album) =

Live!!

Live album by Guitar Wolf
- Released: Japan, June 2000
- Genre: Garage punk, noise punk
- Length: 66:48
- Label: Ki/oon (Japan); KSC2 347-8
- Producer: Guitar Wolf

Guitar Wolf chronology
Rock'n'roll Etiquette (1999)	Live!! (2000)	UFO Romantics (2003)

Live!! is the first live album by Japanese garage punk band Guitar Wolf. It was first released as a limited edition in June 2000, with a MiniCD containing a remix of "Jet Virus" by Alec Empire. The album was released the following month as a standalone disc. Live!! is assembled from four different performances, including a show on 31 October 1999 at CBGB and another from the Hibiya Open-Air Concert Hall.

== Track listing ==
1. Okami Wakusei (Planet of the Wolves)
2. Jet Generation
3. All Night De Buttobase
4. Ryusei Noise
5. Reizouko Zero
6. Jack the Ripper (Link Wray)
7. Wild Zero
8. Rock'n'roll Etiquette
9. Missile Me
10. Kawasaki ZII 750 Rock'n'roll
11. Summertime Blues (Eddie Cochran)
12. Kasei Twist
13. Too Much Junkie Business (Johnny Thunders)
14. Machine Gun Guitar
15. Ramen Shinya 3 Ji
16. Kick Out the Jams (MC5)
17. Rumble (Link Wray)
