= Rock'n'roll Etiquette =

Studio album by Guitar Wolf
- Released: Japan, February 2000; U.S., 19 October 2004
- Genre: Garage punk; noise punk; blues punk
- Length: 34:29 (Japan), 37:29 (U.S.)
- Label: Ki/oon Music (Japan); Narnack Records (U.S.); NCK7022
- Producer: Guitar Wolf

Guitar Wolf chronology
Jet Generation (1999)	Rock'n'roll Etiquette (2000)	Live!! (2000)

Professional ratings
Review scores
Source	Rating
Allmusic	4/5 stars

Rock'n'roll Etiquette is the seventh studio album by Japanese rock band Guitar Wolf. It was released in Japan in February 2000 and in the U.S. on 19 October 2004. The track listing includes covers of "Route 66" by Bobby Troup and "Sore Loser" by the Royal Pendletons, and the U.S. version of the album also includes a cover of "The Way I Walk" by the Cramps.

== Track listing ==
1. God-Speed-You
2. Jet Virus
3. Hot Air Jiro
4. Murder by Rock
5. Toiletface
6. Venus Drive
7. Sore Loser
8. Drives with Wolves
9. Sky Star Jet
10. Earth Love
11. Teardrop Baby
12. Route 66
13. Three AM Noodle Shop
14. Highway Baby
15. Rock'n'roll Etiquette
16. The Way I Walk (U.S. version)
