= Digital Leather =

Shawn Foree musical project

- Origin: Yuma, Arizona, U.S.
- Genres: Indie rock; garage rock; garage punk; psychedelic rock; noise rock; electronic rock; electropunk; synthpunk; new wave; lo-fi
- Years active: 2002–present
- Labels: No Coast Records; King of the Monsters; Shattered; Tic Tac Totally; FDH; Goner Records; Fat Possum; Volar; Crash Cymbals; Southpaw; Kind Turkey Records; Plastic Idol; Disordered; P Trash; Red Lounge; Squooge; Neat Neat Neat; Ghost Highway; Castle Bravo; Avant!; In the Red; Sunburst
- Members: Shawn Foree; Todd Fink
- Past members: Jay Reatard (deceased); Bobby Hussy; Chris Squire

Digital Leather is the musical project led by multi-instrumentalist Shawn Foree. It is recognized for having characteristics of electropunk, new wave, pop, lo-fi, and psychedelic music.

== History ==
Originally from Yuma, Arizona, Foree began calling his project "Digital Leather" when he moved to Tucson, where he studied American literature at the University of Arizona. He used student loan money to buy equipment. He managed to release his first three albums after recording them in his bedroom on labels such as Tic Tac Totally, Jay Reatard's Shattered Records imprint, and FDH Records. He supported this "bedroom project" with several nationwide and European tours. Sorcerer, released on Goner Records in 2008, is a half-live, half-studio record.

In 2009, friend and fellow musician Jay Reatard took over managing duties for the band. Around this time Foree began working on a collection of songs in a fully operational studio. Released in September 2009 by Fat Possum Records, Warm Brother garnered positive reviews. Pitchfork, for example, referred to Foree as sui generis, calling the album a "charming curio." Reportedly, the label did not initially support the album's artwork, which features a shirtless man with the album name taped across his chest.

In 2013, Todd Fink of The Faint joined Digital Leather as a full-time keyboardist and additional recording engineer. "All Faded" was recorded by Todd Fink and Clark Baechle of The Faint between 2013 and 2015. All Faded was released by FDH Records in November 2015.

In a 2020 article, American Songwriter described Foree as "a serious solo, DIY musician."

== Selected discography ==
=== Albums ===
- Digital Leather (2003) King Of The Monsters
- Monologue (2006) Shattered
- Hard At Work (2007) Tic Tac Totally
- Blow Machine (2007) FDH Records
- Sorcerer (2008) Goner Records
- Warm Brother (2009) Fat Possum
- Infinite Sun (2011) Volar
- Sponge (2012) Crash Symbols
- Yes Please, Thank You (2012) Southpaw
- Modern Problems (2012) FDH Records
- Split LP w/ The Hussy (2014) Southpaw
- All Faded (2015) FDH Records
- Whack Jam (2015) Kind Turkey Records
- Pink Thunder (2017) FDH Records
- Headache Heaven (2018) No Coast Records
- FEEET (2019) Stencil Trash
- New Wave Gold (2020) No Coast Records
- Tales From The King (2022) Vermin

=== Singles ===
- Simulator (2005) Plastic Idol
- Split w/ Angry Angles (2006) Shattered
- She Had A Cameltoe (2007) Goner
- Closed My Eyes (2007) Disordered (Italy), P Trash (Germany), FDH (USA)
- Suckface (2007) Red Lounge (Germany)
- The Assault (2008) Red Lounge (Germany)
- Hurts so Bad, demo version (2009) Squoodge (Austria/Germany)
- Power Surge (2009) FDH
- Lousy Manipulator (2009) Neat Neat Neat
- Sponge (2011) Ghost Highway

=== Other projects ===
- Mere Mortals (2012) Self-released
- Diode (2014) Crash Symbols
- TIT (2014) FDH / Volar
- Dome Valley (2014) Castle Bravo
- Black Bug (2015) Avant!

=== Featured ===
- Lost Sounds – Future Touch (2004) In The Red
- Tokyo Electron – S/T (2005) Shattered
- Cutters – 7" (2005) Sunburst
- Terror Visions – World of Shit (2007) FDH
- Devon Disaster – Make Things Bleed (2008) Red Lounge
- Destruction Unit / Black Sunday – Split LP (2008) FDH
- Earthmen & Strangers – S/T (2009) FDH
- Mere Mortals - Purple Fire (2012) Self Released
- The Faint - Doom Abuse (2014)
- The Hussy – Volar EP 7" (2015) Volar
