= The Pharmacy =

American psychedelic/indie rock band

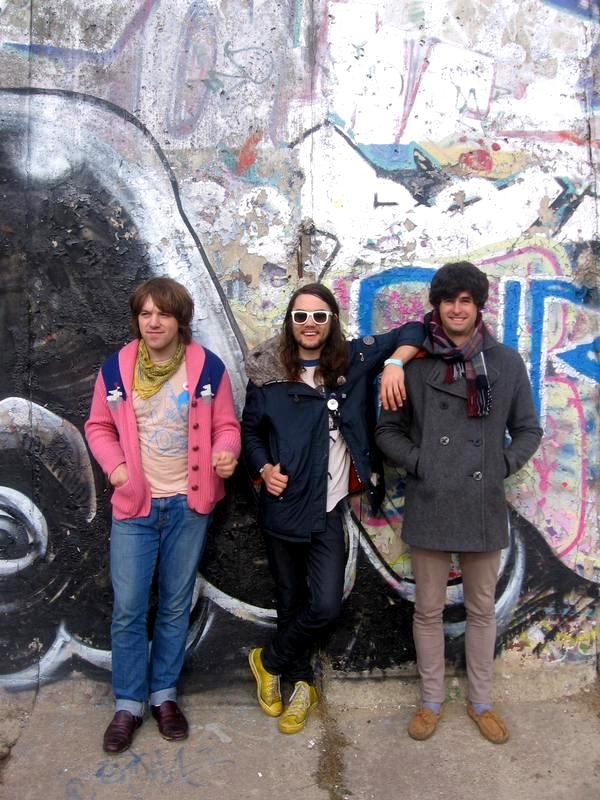
- From left to right: Scott Yoder, Stefan Rubicz, Brendhan Bowers in front of the Berlin Wall

Background information
- Origin: Vashon Island, Washington
- Genres: Indie rock, psychedelic
- Years active: 2002—present
- Labels: Park The Van; Don't Stop Believin'; Tic Tac Totally; High Fives & Handshakes; Bachelor Records (Austria); Kind Turkey Records
- Members: Scott Yoder; Brendhan Bowers; Stefan Rubicz; live members: Aaron Khawaja
- Past members: Joey Seward; Ryan Thompson; Calvin Havnaer; Oscar Allen
- Website: Official Website

The Pharmacy is a psychedelic/indie rock band from Seattle, Washington, consisting of three members: Scott Yoder (guitar, lead vocals), Brendhan Bowers (drums, backing vocals), and Stefan Rubicz (keyboards, backing vocals). They also have been known to record with a wide array of other instruments including strings, horns, and many different types of synthesizers/keyboards. They occasionally play live with bassist Aaron Khawaja.

== History ==
The Pharmacy were founded on Vashon Island, Washington in 2002 by Scott Yoder and Brendhan Bowers. The band was founded while they were in their freshman and junior years in high school. Drawing influence from Nirvana, The Unicorns, The Beatles, Electric Light Orchestra and Andrew W.K. the two created a messy mix of garage and punk, later evolving into a dance-able pop band. Don't Stop Believin' Records(Seattle), a like-minded local record label released a collection of home demos titled "B.F.F." with Scott singing and playing guitar, Joey Seward playing keyboards and bass, and Brendhan playing drums. After graduating high school on Vashon, they moved to Seattle and Olympia. They continued to play while Brendhan attended Evergreen State College in Olympia, Washington.

They first reached local prominence in 2005, after completing their first United States tour with Kimya Dawson of the Moldy Peaches. Throughout most of the tour, they performed as her backing band.

In early 2006 recording sessions began at a Freemason Temple in Seattle. After a few weeks the project was permanently shelved. They instead spent the year with more touring following the release of the Overcast Summer 7-inch EP. They performed at Plan-It-X Fest in July of this year. 2006 also saw the departure of Joey Seward and his subsequent replacement by keyboardist Stefan Rubicz and bass player Ryan Thompson. Not long after Joey's departure he soon joined both Kay Kay and His Weathered Underground as well as Doomhawk.

By the beginning of 2007, they had released the Abominable 7-inch on Chicago label Tic Tac Totally. It featured the song "Tropical Yeti Song" which was accompanied by a music video. They toured frequently throughout the rest of the year, performing at several music festivals including Bumbershoot, Capitol Hill Block Party and the Seattle Weekly Reverb Festival. In September bassist Ryan Thompson was kicked out of the band amid the recording sessions for Choose Yr Own Adventure.

In January 2009 they re-located to New Orleans, Louisiana, where they recorded Weekend in a house that they shared, on a Tascam 4-track. The Weekend LP was released by Don't Stop Believin' Records, and in Europe by Seayou Records (Austria).

In September 2009, the Pharmacy played the New Island Festival on Governors Island in New York Harbor. The Pharmacy has toured Europe three times, playing shows in over 18 countries. In 2008, a split 7-inch with Japanther was released by Austrian label Bachelor Records . In May 2010 they played at Yo Garage in Monterrey, Mexico during a 5 month long tour of the US/Europe. In January 2011 they played at the Rock & Roll Circus at Lincoln Center. In 2011 the band released their well received 7-inch EP, "Dig Your Grave" via Kind Turkey Records, Bobby Hussy's (The Hussy, Fire Heads, Cave Curse, TIT) record label based in Madison, WI.

They currently live in Seattle.

Scott Yoder also performs/records in a side-project called Fuzzy Cloaks with fellow Pharmacy member Stefan Rubicz. Bobby Hussy's label Kind Turkey Records released the debut cassette shortly after the band formed.

== Albums ==
- B.F.F. LP/CD (June, 2005, 2nd press blue cover - January 2006)
- Choose Yr. Own Adventure CD/LP/Cassette (February 29, 2008)
- Weekend LP/CD/Cassette (March 2010)
- Stoned & Alone LP/CD/Cassette (2012)
- Spells LP/CD (2014)

== Singles, EPs, Collections ==
- Ship of Fools, a five-song 7-inch record (August, 2003)
- Ray-Gun Mariachi demo CD-R (2004)
- B.F.F. LP/CD (June, 2005, 2nd press blue cover - January 2006)
- Abominable, a two-song 7-inch record lmtd. 500 copies (Tic Tac Totally March, 2007)
- Overcast Summer, a four-song 7-inch record lmtd. 333 copies (March, 2006)
- WAYDWYL split 7-inch with Japanther (September, 2008)
- Solid Melts split cassette with Baby Birds Don't Drink Milk (September, 2009)
- Dig Your Grave a four-song 7-inch record lmtd. 500 copies (Kind Turkey Records, February 3, 2012)
- Josephine a four-song EP (Seayou Records, May 11, 2012)
- Apparition a one-song 7-inch picture disc (Electricity & Lust Records, March 5, 2013)
- Trouble Maker a four-song digital EP (Seayou Records, October 31, 2013)

== Videos ==
- "Tropical Yeti Song" (2007) from the Abominable 7-inch on Tic Tac Totally
- "Little Toys On A Shelf" (2008) from the Choose Yr Own Adventure LP/CD
- "WAYDWYL" (2009) from the Weekend LP - directed by SKINNY (Directing Team)
- "Dig Your Grave" (2012) from the Dig Your Grave 7-inch EP
- "Pines" (2012) from the Dig Your Grave 7-inch EP
