= Taxi Taxi =

Taxi Taxi may refer to:

- Taxi! Taxi! (1927 film), 1927 American silent film directed by Melville Brown
- Taxi! Taxi! (2013 film), 2013 Singaporean comedy film
- Taxi Taxi, alternate title for the 2002 French film, Taxi 2
- "Taxi Taxi", song by Cher on her Believe album

== See also ==
- Taxi Taxie, a 1977 Bollywood film
- Taxi (disambiguation)
