= Singles 06–07 =

Compilation album by Jay Reatard
- Released: June 24, 2008
- Genres: Garage punk, power pop, synthpunk
- Label: In the Red

Jay Reatard chronology
Singles 06–07 (2008)	Matador Singles 08 (2009)

Professional ratings
Review scores
Source	Rating
Pitchfork Media	8.1/10
The A.V. Club	A
Kids Like You & Me	A

Singles 06–07 is Jay Reatard's solo debut compilation LP album, released on June 24, 2008 by In The Red Records. This compilation is both a culmination of the sounds of Reatard's former punk and synth bands and a foray into more melodic pop and rock and roll.

== Track listing ==
1. "Night of Broken Glass"
2. "Another Person"
3. "All Over Again"
4. "Feeling Blank Again"
5. "I Know a Place"
6. "Don't Let Him Come Back"
7. "Hammer I Miss You"
8. "It's So Useless"
9. "All Wasted"
10. "In the Dark"
11. "Searching for You"
12. "Haunting You"
13. "Let It All Go"
14. "Blood Visions"
15. "Turning Blue"
16. "It's So Easy"
17. "Oh It's Such a Shame"
