= Squarehead (band) =

- Origin: Dublin, Ireland
- Genres: Garage pop, indie rock
- Years active: 2008–present
- Label: Richter Collective
- Members: Roy Duffy; Ruan van Vliet; Ian McFarlane

Squarehead are an Irish garage pop band from Dublin composed of lead singer / guitarist Roy Duffy, bassist Ian McFarlane and Ruan van Vliet on drums.

== History ==
Squarehead were formed in January 2010 when Roy Duffy began recording solo acoustic songs. Roy and Ian had previously been in a band (called Vimanas) with Lar Kaye of Adebisi Shank.

The band released their first single "Fake Blood" on 7" Vinyl through Any Other City Records, a label run by Villagers drummer, James Byrne. In a public vote on Nialler9 Music Blog, "Fake Blood" was voted Number One in "Irish Songs of 2010"

The band's second single, "Midnight Enchilada" was released by the Richter Collective Label (Adebisi Shank, The Redneck Manifesto, ASIWYFA) on 21 March 2011. The single has received plays on Don Letts & Lauren Laverne show on 6Music, the Dermot O'Leary show on BBC Radio 2 and the X-Posure show on XFM

On 25 February 2011, Morrissey attended a Squarehead show at the Workmans Club, Dublin

== Discography ==
Squarehead discography at Discogs
