= Nots (band) =

American punk band

- Genres: rock; alternative; punk
- Years active: 2011–present
- Labels: Heavenly Records; Goner Records
- Members: Natalie Hoffmann (vocals/guitar); Charlotte Watson (drums); Meredith Lones (bass)
- Past members: Laurel Ferndon (drums); Alexandra Eastburn (keyboards)
- Website: wearenots.bandcamp.com

Nots are a three-piece noise-punk band from Memphis, who released their debut album We Are Nots in 2014 and have toured North America and Europe. The band are fronted by Natalie Hoffmann (vocals/guitar) with Charlotte Watson (drums), Alexandra Eastburn (keyboards) and Meredith Lones (bass). The band are signed to Goner Records in North America and Heavenly in Europe.

== Career ==
Originally from Nixa, Missouri, Hoffmann moved to Memphis in 2007 to attend the local art college, where she studied photography and design. The band began in 2011 as a collaboration between Watson and Hoffmann while they were both members of other local bands. Hoffmann was a member of Ex-Cult while Watson played with the Manatees. They were joined by Laurel Ferndon on drums. The name was taken from a Twister-inspired collage that Hoffmann had created.

The band made a demo tape that they submitted to Goner Records who decided to release it as an EP. Their debut release, Dust Red appeared in October 2013, and was followed by the single "Fix" b/w "Modern" in June 2014. Both were produced by Keith Cooper. Ferndon left in early 2014, as Hoffmann and Watson prepared to record their album with Doug Easley at the helm. They recruited Alexandra Eastburn on keyboards and Meredith Lones on bass as replacements while Watson moved to drums. Hoffman described the recording process as "since it was a new lineup, and I think you can definitely feel this sort of combined intensity and really stubborn determination that was stewing when we recorded the album". In the same year the band also performed at the SXSW festival. The digital-only single "Decadence" appeared on October supported by a video directed by Geoffrey Brent Shrewsbury. The track "Reactor" was made available in the same month. On November 11, 2014, the album We Are Nots was released in North America, while they embarked on their first headlining tour around America.

In June 2015, they released the single "Virgin Mary" b/w "Shelf Life" on Goner, while the latter was made available on streaming platforms. In September 2015 the band signed to Heavenly Records for European releases. Their debut album was re-released in November of the same year, followed by an eight-date European tour.

In September 2016, the band released their second album entitled Cosmetic. it was preceded by the single "Entertain Me".

Since graduating, Hoffmann also works as a visual artist and instructor at the Memphis College of Art.

On May 10, 2019, the band will release their third album 3.

== Discography ==
=== Albums ===
- We are Nots (2014)
- Cosmetic (2016)
- 3 (2019)

=== EPs ===
- Dust Red (2013)

=== Singles ===
- Fix (2014)
- Reactor (2015)
- Virgin Mary (2015)
