= UFO Romantics =

Studio album by Guitar Wolf
- Released: 6 March 2002
- Recorded: 2002
- Genre: Garage rock, garage punk
- Length: 40:13
- Label: Ki/oon Music (Japan); KSCL 438; Narnack Records (US); NCK7001
- Producer: Guitar Wolf

Guitar Wolf chronology
Live!! (2000)	UFO Romantics (2002)	Loverock (2004)

Professional ratings
Review scores
Source	Rating
AllMusic	3/5 stars

UFO Romantics is the eighth full-length album by Japanese rock band Guitar Wolf. It was released in Japan on 6 March 2002 and in the United States on 24 August 2003.

== Track listing ==
1. Fire Ball Red (3:00)
2. After School Thunder (2:27)
3. Zaaa Zaaa Asphalt (3:32)
4. Taxi Driver (2:15)
5. Diamond Honey (2:17)
6. Gion Midnite (4:00)
7. Sparkle Baby (3:48)
8. UFO Romantics (4:35)
9. Nagasaki Jet (3:28)
10. Jett Beer (2:55)
11. Orange Juice (2:24)
12. Alcohol Ace (1:49)
13. Lightning's Melody (3:44)

== Personnel ==
- Seiji (Guitar Wolf) – guitar, vocals
- Billy (Bass Wolf) – bass
- Tōru (Drum Wolf) – drums
