= Kung Fu Ramone =

Studio album by Guitar Wolf
- Released: U.S. 1994
- Recorded: 1992–1994
- Genre: Noise punk, garage punk
- Length: ?:?
- Label: Bag Of Hammers; BOH-003
- Producer: Seiji

Guitar Wolf chronology
Wolf Rock! (1993)	Kung Fu Ramone (1994)	Run Wolf Run (1994)

Professional ratings
Review scores
Source	Rating
AllMusic	2.5/5 stars

Kung Fu Ramone is the second album by Japanese rock band Guitar Wolf. It was released only on vinyl in the U.S., in 1994. Some of the songs on the LP were later re-recorded and used on their debut compact disc album, Run Wolf Run, as well as in later projects.

== Track listing ==
1. "Kung Fu Ramone"
2. "Thunders Guitar"
3. "Genocide"
4. "Run Wolf Run"
5. "Jett Rock"
6. "El Toro"
7. "Ryusei Noise"
8. "Baby Indian"
9. "The Wild Guitar"
10. "Buttobase!! Allnight"
11. "Kick Out the Jams"
12. "Rumble"
13. "Planet Blues"
