= Missile Me! =

Studio album by Guitar Wolf
- Released: Japan, July 1995; US, 19 November 1996
- Recorded: 1994–1995
- Genre: Garage punk, noise punk
- Length: 28:05
- Label: Less than TV (Japan); IDCW-1003; Matador Records (US); Ole 219-2
- Producer: Guitar Wolf

Guitar Wolf chronology
Run Wolf Run (1994)	Missile Me! (1995)	Planet of the Wolves (1997)

Missile Me! is an album by the Japanese rock band Guitar Wolf. It was released in Japan in July 1995 and in the United States on 19 November 1996.

== Critical reception ==
Professional ratings
Review scores
Source	Rating
AllMusic	3/5 stars
Entertainment Weekly	A−

The A.V. Club called the album "28 corrosive minutes of sludgy, no-polish, roughed-up punk rock." Entertainment Weekly wrote that "these lo-fi speed freaks pulverize rockabilly, garage, and hardcore into a fuzzed-out raunch-fest that's as insistent as it is funny."

== Track listing ==
1. "Missile Me"
2. "Hurricane Rock"
3. "Kung Fu Ramone Culmination Tactic"
4. "Can-Nana Fever"
5. "Midnight Violence Rock’n Roll"
6. "Link Wray Man"
7. "Guitar Star"
8. "Racing Rock"
9. "Jet Rock’n Roll"
10. "Devil Stomp"
11. "Jet Blues"
12. "Venus Drive"
