= Wild Zero =

1999 Japanese comedy horror film

- Promotional release poster
- Directed by: Tetsuro Takeuchi
- Written by: Satoshi Takagi
- Produced by: Kaichiro Furata
- Starring: Guitar Wolf; Masashi Endō; Makoto Inamiya
- Cinematography: Motoki Kobayashi
- Edited by: Tomoe Kubota
- Music by: Guitar Wolf
- Production company: Dragon Pictures
- Release date: August 8, 1999 (Japan)
- Running time: 98 minutes
- Country: Japan
- Language: Japanese

Wild Zero is a 1999 Japanese comedy horror film directed by Tetsuro Takeuchi. It stars Masashi Endō as Ace, a fan of the Japanese rock power trio Guitar Wolf (who star as themselves). After assisting the group, the band's eponymous vocalist makes Ace his blood brother and gives him a whistle to blow during times of trouble. Ace later meets Tobio (Kwancharu Shitichai) during a gas station robbery. The group later finds themselves in the middle of a zombie outbreak.

Wild Zero was shown as part of the Midnight Madness series at the 2000 Toronto International Film Festival.

== Plot ==
After a meteorite lands in Asahi, Japanese power trio Guitar Wolf—composed of vocalist and guitarist Guitar Wolf, bass guitarist Bass Wolf, and drummer Drum Wolf—performs a concert. Following the show, the band confronts their manager, the Captain. As they hold each other at gunpoint, punk rock enthusiast Ace overhears the Captain proclaims that rock music is obsolete. Ace bursts into the room, allowing Guitar Wolf to shoot the Captain's hand. Guitar Wolf makes Ace his blood brother, and gives him a whistle to blow if he finds himself in danger.

Some time later, Masao, Hanako and her lover Toshi stop at a gas station while on their way to see the fallen meteorite. Masao attempts to rob the gas station, but is interrupted by an unwitting Ace, who arrives on a motorcycle. After Masao, Hanako and Toshi drive away, Ace meets the shy Tobio, and soon departs. On the road, he comes across a stopped vehicle, whose passengers are being eaten by zombies. He then turns around and heads back towards the gas station to protect Tobio. Elsewhere, Masao, Hanako and Toshi stop near a lake, and Masao is killed by zombies.

Ace returns to the gas station and rescues Tobio from a group of zombies. They flee to an abandoned building, and once inside, share a kiss. Tobio then reveals to Ace that she is transgender, causing him to scream and run into another room. There, he sees a vision of Guitar Wolf, who tells him that "love has no borders, nationalities, or genders". Ace then realizes that zombies have entered the building, and blows the whistle Guitar Wolf gave him. Guitar Wolf hears the whistle, and the band heads to his location. Ace begins killing zombies with a crowbar, while Tobio finds her way outside and sees an alien spacecraft in the sky.

Guitar Wolf is stopped on the road by Hanako and Toshi, who are allowed to ride with them. They go to the gas station where Hanako and Toshi last saw Ace, and are soon joined by arms dealer Yamazaki. Guitar Wolf dispatches the zombies surrounding Yamazaki using laser-like guitar picks. The group visits Yamazaki's weapons cache, where Toshi is bitten by a zombie. As alien spaceships fly around the world, Guitar Wolf sets out again to find Ace. Toshi becomes a zombie, and Yamazaki shoots a bitten Hanako. Bass Wolf and Drum Wolf's car is surrounded by zombies, leaving Guitar Wolf to continue on, with Yamazaki following behind in a military vehicle.

Guitar Wolf saves Ace from a horde of zombies. Ace expresses regret for not having stayed with Tobio, receives a handgun from Yamazaki, and leaves on a motorcycle. The Captain, who tracked down Guitar Wolf with the help of the zombified Toshi, begins launching grenades at the building in which Guitar Wolf and Yamazaki are. Guitar Wolf jumps out of the building as the room he is in explodes. After a fight with Guitar Wolf, the Captain begins shooting explosive beams from his eyes, until Bass Wolf and Drum Wolf arrive and kill the Captain using a rocket launcher. Elsewhere, Ace searches for Tobio and eventually finds her at the gas station. As Ace and Tobio embrace, the zombified Toshi finds Hanako, also undead, and they kiss.

The alien mothership passes above Guitar Wolf and Yamazaki. Guitar Wolf stands atop a building, unsheaths his guitar—his fretboard being the handle of a sword—and uses the blade to cut through the mothership. The mothership explodes, and the zombies are all neutralized. Ace confesses his love for Tobio, and they kiss. After sunrise, Guitar Wolf gifts Ace a comb, and the band rides off into the distance. Ace says he never again went to a Guitar Wolf show, but that he learned "love has no borders, nationalities, or genders", and that he will remain with Tobio.

== Cast ==
- Seiji as himself / Guitar Wolf
- Bass Wolf as himself
- Drum Wolf as himself
- Masashi Endō as Ace
- Kwancharu Shitichai as Tobio
  - Yōko Asada as the voice of Tobio
- Nakajo Haruka as Yamazaki
  - Kazuko Yanaga as the voice of Yamazaki
- Taneko as Hanako
- Yoshiyuki Morishita as Toshi
- Masao as Masao
- Fusamori Tawaki as Mori
- Murata Akihiko as Toshio
- Shiro Namiki as Kondo

== Production ==
Wild Zero was directed by Takeuchi Tetsuro, who was predominantly known for shooting music videos. The film was shot in Thailand with members of the Thai military and their families as zombies.

== Release ==
Wild Zero was released in Japan on August 8, 1999. The film was shown at the 2000 Toronto International Film Festival.

=== Reception ===
Variety gave the film a mixed review, stating that "Pic has everything the midnight crowd could possibly want, although such items generally have a hard time hitting other parts of the theatrical clock." Jonathan Crow of AllMovie gave the film a score of three-and-a-half stars out of five, writing that its "giddy energy and unrepentantly silly story line are a hoot and a holler of fun."

== Home media ==
Synapse Films released Wild Zero on DVD on October 28, 2003.

== Notes ==
=== References ===
- Sharp, Jasper (2011). Historical Dictionary of Japanese Cinema. Scarecrow Press. ISBN 978-0810875418.
