= Run Wolf Run =

Studio album by Guitar Wolf
- Released: Japan, April 1994
- Recorded: 1993–1994
- Genre: Noise punk, blues punk
- Length: 36:00
- Label: Less than TV; IDCW-1002
- Producer: Guitar Wolf

Guitar Wolf chronology
Kung Fu Ramone (1994)	Run Wolf Run (1994)	Missile Me! (1995)

Run Wolf Run is the third studio album by the Japanese rock band Guitar Wolf, released in Japan in April 1994.

== Track listing ==
1. "Run Wolf Run"
2. "Captain Guitar"
3. "Jett Rock"
4. "Baby Indian"
5. "Kouya No Guitar" (Guitar in Wasteland)
6. "All Night De Buttobase!!" (Roaring All Night!!)
7. "Kick Out the Jams" (MC5 cover)
8. "Rumble"
9. "UFO Shakin'"
10. "Thunders Guitar"
11. "El Toro"
12. "Wakusei Blues" (Planet Blues)
