= Teengenerate =

Japanese punk rock band

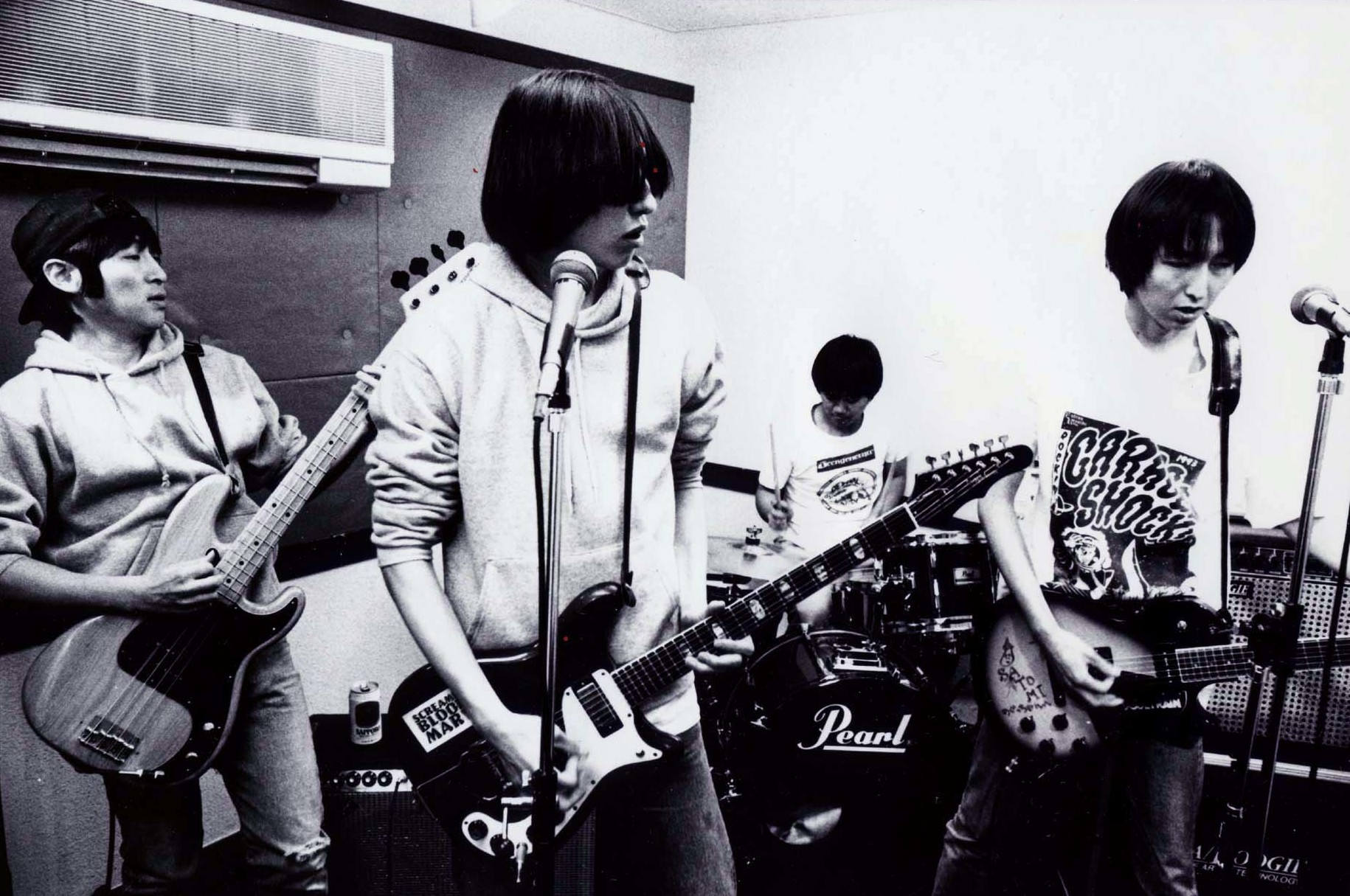
- 1995. Out-take for the album Get Action!.

Background information
- Origin: Tokyo, Japan
- Genres: Punk rock, garage punk, garage rock
- Years active: 1993–1996; 2005
- Labels: Verve, Estrus, Lance Rock, Crypt, Sympathy for the Record Industry
- Spinoffs: Firestarter
- Past members: Fifi; Fink; Sammy; Shoe; Suck

Teengenerate were a Japanese punk rock band from 1993 to 1996, known for their fun style of playing garage punk with a sense of humor and often incomprehensible English lyrics. After disbanding for a time, some of its members (Fifi, Fink and Sammy) went on to start the band Firestarter. At the time of their split, Teengenerate consisted of Fink (guitar, vocals), Fifi (guitar, vocals), Sammy (bass) and Shoe (drums). Their original drummer was called Suck. In 2005, Teengenerate reformed for a series of shows worldwide, gaining new fans and gathering old ones back into the fold. Other past bands that featured Teengenerate members include: Fifi and the Mach III, the Raydios and the Tweezers. The Teengenerate song "My GTO" was used in the 2000 film, Wild Zero, directed by Tetsuro Takeuchi. The Teengenerate song "My Girl Dressed in Black" was also featured in the 2022 film, "Sam Now", directed by Reed Harkness.

== Discography ==
=== Albums ===
#	Information	Copies sold
1st	Audio Recording: Released: 1994	
2nd	Get Action!: Released: 1994; Label: Crypt Records; Format: LP, CD	
Compilation	Smash Hits!!: Released: September 22, 1995; Label: Estrus Records; Format: LP, CD	
3rd	Savage!!! = Let's Go To The Top: Released: November 12, 1996; Label: Sympathy for the Record Industry; Format: 10", CD	

=== Singles ===
- "Get Me Back" (1993)
- "Sex Cow" (1994) (500 special 'blue vinyl' copies released)
- "I Don't Mind" (1994)
- "Car Crazy !..." (1994)
- "No Time" (1995)
- "Out of Sight" (1995)
- "Flying Over You" (1996)
- "Dressed in Black" (1996)
- "Wild Wild Teengenerate" (1996) (Teengenerate play three songs of the Belgian band The Kids)
- "V.M.Live issue No. 22" (November 2, 1997)

=== Split singles ===
- Split with Stepford 5
- Split with American Soul Spiders
- Split with Screaming Bloody Marys (1994)
- Split with Rip Offs (1994)
- Split with Bum

=== Compilations ===
- The Estrus Cocktail Companion - "Let's Take Another Booze"
- Pop Goes the Weasel Vol 1. (1994)
- Cheapo Crypt Sampler CD - "Get Me Back" (1994)
- Watch For Me Girl, A Tribute To DMZ (1994)
- Turban Renewal: A Tribute To Sam The Sham & The Pharaohs (1994) (LP version released as well)
- 500 Miles To Glory - "My G.T.O." (1995) (Reissued September 9, 1997 with bonus "Picture Disc")
- Oh Canaduh! (August 15, 1996)
- Tokyo Trashville
- The R.A.F.R. Vol. 1 (1995)
- Not So Pretty, (Pretty Things tribute) (1995)
- Searching For Cool (Only 500 copies)
- Skookum Chief Powered Teenage Zit Rock Angst (1995)
- Wild News From The World
- Viva La Vinyl Vol. 2
- Cheapo Crypt Sampler No. 2! (1997)
- Flaming Burnout (1997)
- The Early Ones (1999)
- Certain Damage !

=== VHS ===
- Bottle Up & Go!
- Power Ground Video Vol. 2
