= Lost Sounds =

American synth-punk band

Background information
- Origin: Memphis, Tennessee, United States
- Genres: darkwave; synth punk; goth rock; industrial rock
- Years active: 1999–2005
- Labels: Big Neck; Empty; Contaminated; In the Red; On/On Switch; Goner; Solid Sex Lovie Doll; Cochon; The Holy Cobra Society; Rockin' Bones; Tic Tac Totally!; Fat Possum
- Past members: Jay Reatard (deceased); Rich Crook; Patrick Jordan; Alicja Trout

Lost Sounds was a dark wave band from Memphis, Tennessee that was formed in 1999. The band was made up of Rich Crook on drums, Patrick Jordan on bass, Jay Reatard on synth, guitar, and vocals, and Alicja Trout on synth, guitar, and vocals. The band, originally working within the garage rock genre, had a collection of analog keyboards Trout had used in her previous band, The Clears. The bizarre combination of new wave synths and mangled guitars showed a Punk rock influence as well.

The band frequently dealt with dark, apocalyptic themes ranging from the Book of Revelation ("Breathing Machine") to the Columbine High School massacre ("Blackcoats/Whitefear"). The band's last show was in May 2005 in Stuttgart, Germany, and they broke up right after. Rich Crook went on to write and record music in the band Lover! Former band members have since formed Sweet Knives as a self-described reboot of Lost Sounds, after Reatard died in 2010.

== History ==
=== Pre-Lost Sounds ===
In the summer of 1997, Rich Crook moved to Memphis and met Jay Reatard, later co-forming The Reatards in 1998, becoming well known in the Memphis punk community with the release of Teenage Hate (1998). They would switch instruments, with Crook becoming a drummer by the release of their sophomore album Grown Up, Fucked Up (1999). Alicja Trout was a vocalist, guitarist, and keyboard player for the short-lived band The Clears (1997–98). The band would dress up in silly and robotic outfits inspired by Kraftwerk and Devo.

=== Formation and Memphis is Dead ===
In 1998, Trout became friends with Reatard and would make kitchen recordings the following year. At the time, Reatard's style was inspired by the Oblivians and garage rock, and he had an interest in Devo. Initially, he was slightly uncomfortable with using analog keyboards. Unlike their respective bands, the Reatards and the Clears, they would experiment with their sound and make songs that sounded completely different in comparison. By the time they were signed to In the Red Records, they had double-stack keyboards.

In the spring of 1999, the Lost Sounds were formed by Reatards lead member Jay Reatard, The Clears and The Fitts member Alicja Trout, and Reatards drummer Rich Crook. Reatard and Trout sang and played guitars and keys for the rest of the band's activity. They made their debut with the 4-track 7" EP, Plastic Skin (2000), via Solid Sex Lovie Doll Records, which included the kitchen recordings Reatard and Trout recorded. By 2001, they were mostly playing in south and midwest states including New Orleans and Chicago, and at the time, began production of their debut studio album Memphis is Dead (2001) via Bigneck Records, recorded at "This Ain’t Easley’s Studios", the studio named by Reatard.

=== Black-Wave and Rat's Brains & Microchips ===
Shortly after Memphis is Dead's release, the Lost Sounds started working on their sophomore studio album Black-Wave (2001) at The People’s Temple, a warehouse close to Sun Studio. The People’s Temple was a punk collective where parties and shows took place on the first floor, while Black-Wave was recorded on the second floor. In the production, the songs were written individually, with a slight retouch from Crook and Reatard on Trout's ideas. The title of the album was inspired by an incident where Jason "Panzer" Craft from the Persuaders said, "You guys are like black metal and new wave," with both of the genres' names being combined into "Black-Wave". With the release of Black-Wave, the Lost Sounds went back on touring, with Reatard's anxiety being constant, which led to many issues during the tour. During the tour, the group began including occasional fourth member Patrick Jordan, who would play bass for the band.

After touring, they began production on their third studio album, Rat's Brains & Microchips (2002), which was recorded digitally at Tronic Graveyard. Its release helped advance Lost Sounds' popularity, increasing income from tours and merchandise. The album ended up as their final album with Empty due to competition with record labels wanting to sign Lost Sounds, including John Reis, founder of Swami Records, who wanted to produce an album with the band. Larry Hardy, owner of In the Red Records, was interested in the band. The band would later tour with Rocket from the Crypt, one of Reis's bands.

=== Lost Sounds and breakup ===
After releasing Rat's Brains & Microchips, Lost Sounds signed to In the Red Records after departing from Empty Records, and were given a bigger advance to purchase a 24-track recorder for their fourth EP Future Touch, which was to establish them as a band signed to the record label. They would finish the rest of the 24-track recorder with their self-titled album (2004), and embark on their final tour in support of the album, which extended to Europe. In terms of their touring career, Trout and Reatard stopped dating and developed interpersonal issues, including Reatard's frustrations with Trout making records with other bands, and would intensify if others appreciated her other bands more. In London, Reatard developed drinking problems and got into physical and verbal altercations with Trout and Crook, leading to a sudden turmoil in the band.

Despite their breakup, Lost Sounds kept touring for several months, with Reatard not wanting to be there. At the time, he began recording his debut solo studio album Blood Visions (2006), and told the band he wanted to do a solo album. The band would discuss doing another Lost Sounds album, but due to Reatard's troubled personality, it never progressed. Blood Visions would be about his breakup with Trout and Lost Sounds. In 2005, after their last show in May 2005 at Stuttgart, Germany, the Lost Sounds eventually broke up.

== Aftermath ==
After the band's breakup, Reatard went on to achieve a successful career, with Blood Visions (2006) and Watch Me Fall (2009) through In the Red, Fat Possum, and Matador Records. However, it was cut short when he died in his sleep from cocaine toxicity in January 2010, with alcoholism being a contributing factor to his death. Trout would go on to work with other bands including Nervous Patterns (with Reatard), River City Tanlines, and Black Sunday, and has formed the indie record label Contaminated Records. Crook leads the band Lover! and also plays drums with the Knaughty Knights.

== Discography ==
=== Studio albums ===
- Memphis is Dead, Bigneck Records, 2001
- Black-Wave, Empty Records, 2001
- Rat's Brains & Microchips, Empty Records, 2002
- Lost Sounds, In the Red Records, 2004

=== 7-inch/EPs ===
- Plastic Skin, Solid Sex Lovie Doll, 2000
- 1+1 = Nothing, Empty Records, 2000
- Future Touch, In The Red Records, 2004
- Motocycle Leather Boy, Tic Tac Totally, 2007

=== Compilations ===
- Outtakes & Demos Vol. 1, Contaminated Records, 2001
- Demos & Outtakes, Vol. 1, Hate Records, 2001
- Demos II, On On Switch, 2003
- Blac Static, Fat Possum Records, 2011
