= Watch Me Fall =

Studio album by Jay Reatard
- Released: August 4, 2009
- Genres: Garage rock, indie rock, power pop, punk rock
- Length: 32:17
- Language: English
- Label: Matador Records

Jay Reatard chronology
Blood Visions (2006)	Watch Me Fall (2009)

Watch Me Fall is the second and final solo studio album by Jay Reatard. It was released on August 4, 2009 by Matador Records.

== Reception ==
Professional ratings
Aggregate scores
Source	Rating
AnyDecentMusic?	7.0/10
Metacritic	76/100
Review scores
Source	Rating
AllMusic	4/5 stars
Drowned in Sound	7/10
Entertainment Weekly	A−
MusicOMH	4/5 stars
NME	8/10
Pitchfork	7.9/10
PopMatters	8/10
Slant Magazine	4/5 stars
Spin	4.5/5 stars
The Toronto Star	2.5/4 stars

Initial critical response to Watch Me Fall was positive. At Metacritic, which assigns a normalized rating out of 100 to reviews from mainstream critics, the album has received an average score of 76 based on 23 reviews.

The album briefly entered the U.S. Billboard 200, peaking at 182.

== Track listing ==
No.	Title	Length
1.	"It Ain't Gonna Save Me"	2:22
2.	"Before I Was Caught"	2:07
3.	"Man of Steel"	2:31
4.	"Can't Do It Anymore"	1:45
5.	"Faking It"	1:56
6.	"I'm Watching You"	3:46
7.	"Wounded"	2:36
8.	"Rotten Mind"	2:19
9.	"Nothing Now"	2:43
10.	"My Reality"	2:43
11.	"Hang Them All"	3:40
12.	"There Is No Sun"	3:49
Total length:		32:17

iTunes bonus track
No.	Title	Length
13.	"Tiny Little Home"	1:44
Total length:		34:01

== Musicians ==
- Jay Reatard – vocals and all instruments, except:
- Billy Hayes – drums on tracks 6, 7, 8, 11
- Jonathan Kirkscey – cello on tracks 11, 12
