= Blood Visions =

Studio album by Jay Reatard
- Released: October 10, 2006
- Recorded: July 2005 – December 2005
- Genre: Punk rock; garage punk; garage rock; indie rock; power pop
- Length: 29:09
- Label: In the Red; Fat Possum

Jay Reatard chronology
Blood Visions (2006)	Watch Me Fall (2009)

Blood Visions is the debut solo studio album by American punk rock singer and songwriter Jay Reatard, formerly of the Reatards.

The track, "Oh It's Such a Shame" has been covered by Deerhunter (for the "Fluorescent Grey/Oh, It's Such a Shame" split single) and more recently by Arcade Fire during their support tour for The Suburbs.

Just prior to Jay Reatard's death in 2010, he sold the rights to the record to Fat Possum Records, after which In the Red Records ceased production and distribution of the record.

The album was reissued on Record Store Day in 2016 as an exclusive 10th anniversary 12" on red vinyl, featuring a gatefold jacket and bonus 7" of Blood Visions demos. The release was limited to 2000 copies.

== Critical reception ==
Professional ratings
Review scores
Source	Rating
AllMusic	3.5/5 stars
Dusted Magazine	Positive
Pitchfork	9.1/10
JunkMedia	4/5 stars
Robert Christgau	A−

The music review online magazine Pitchfork Media, placed Blood Visions at number 200 on their list of top 200 albums of the 2000s.

== Track listing ==
No.	Title	Length
1.	"Blood Visions"	1:32
2.	"Greed, Money, Useless Children"	0:54
3.	"It's So Easy"	1:10
4.	"My Shadow"	3:18
5.	"My Family"	1:43
6.	"Death Is Forming"	2:06
7.	"Oh It's Such a Shame"	2:28
8.	"Not a Substitute"	1:05
9.	"Nightmares"	2:13
10.	"I See You Standing There"	1:39
11.	"We Who Wait" (The Adverts Cover)	2:01
12.	"Fading All Away"	1:28
13.	"Turning Blue"	2:41
14.	"Puppet Man"	1:44
15.	"Waiting for Something"	3:16
Total length:		29:09

== Musicians ==
- Jay Reatard – vocals, guitar, bass, drums
- Alix Brown – bass on "I See You Standing There" and vocals on "We Who Wait"
