= Alicja Trout =

- Origin: Memphis, Tennessee
- Genres: Indie rock; garage rock; punk rock; rock and roll; electronic rock; electropunk; synthpunk
- Occupations: Singer-songwriter, musician, artist
- Instruments: Vocals, guitar, bass, keyboard
- Years active: 1996–present
- Labels: Contaminated Records; In the Red; Empty Records
- Website: Contaminated Records

Alicja Anna Trout is an American, Memphis-based rock guitarist, singer and songwriter.

She is best known for her work with the synth-heavy Lost Sounds, which she started with Jay Reatard. Her current band, the River City Tanlines, were named an essential Memphis band by Spin Magazine in December 2007.

Trout also owns and operates Contaminated Records, her own independent record label. She graduated from Memphis College of Art with an MFA in 1997. In 2009, she was featured on the MTV show $5 Cover.

== Other musical projects ==
After the Lost Sounds "abruptly yet not unexpectedly" disbanded in May 2005, Trout's focus switched to the River City Tanlines, a more rock and roll oriented band. Trout has also played a part in a number of other Memphis-based rock bands, including: The Clears, The Fitts, The CC Riders, Mouserocket, Destruction Unit, and Black Sunday.
In March 2016, Certified PR Records released a 12-inch LP record of her latest solo project, "Alicja-Pop!". Currently, Trout maintains River City Tanlines and Mouserocket, a re-boot of Lost Sounds called Sweet Knives, and Fresh Flesh, a band in which she is not the primary songwriter. Sweet Knives did a midwest/east coast tour in August 2016.

== Selected discography ==
=== The Clears ===
- The Clears LP (Resort Theory Entertainment, 1997, RT 006)
- The Clears CD (Smells Like Records, 1997, SLR 23)

=== The Fitts ===
- I Can't Break Away 7-inch (Contaminated Records, 1998, CR 001)
- I Have To Laugh 7-inch (Big Neck Records!, 2003, BN-026)

=== The Lost Sounds ===
==== 7-inch singles ====
- Lost Sounds 7-inch (Solid Sex Lovie Doll Records, 2000, SSLD 001)
- 1 + 1 = Nothing 7-inch (Empty Records US, 2001, MTR-387)
- No One Killer 7-inch (The Holy Cobra Society, 2004, THCS 004)
- Demos & Outtakes Vol. 2 3×7″ (Rockin' Bones, 2004, RON 052)
- Motorcycle Leather Boy 7-inch (Tic Tac Totally, 2008, TTT-011)
- Split 7-inch w/ Vanishing (Cochon Records, 2003, Coch 012)

==== Albums ====
- Memphis Is Dead LP/CD (Big Neck Records!, 2001, BN-014)
- Black-Wave 2×LP/CD (Empty Records US, 2001, MTR-392)
- Outtakes & Demos Vol. 1 CD-R (Contaminated Records, 2001, no cat.no.)
- Outtakes & Demos Vol. 1 LP (Hate Records, 2002, hate 24)
- Recent Transmissions CD-R (Contaminated Records, 2002, no cat.no.)
- Rats Brains & Microchips LP/CD (Empty Records US, 2002, MTR-397)
- Demos II CD (On/On Switch, 2003, OOS/004)
- Future Touch 12-inchEP/CDEP (In The Red, 2004, ITR 115)
- Lost Sounds LP/CD (In The Red, 2004, ITR 117)
- Lost Lost: demos, sounds, alternate takes & unused songs 1999–2004 LP/CD (Goner, 2012, 84GONE)

==== Compilations inclusions ====
- Fields And Streams 2×CD (Kill Rock Stars, 2002, KRS-341)
- Pain In The Big Neck CD (Big Neck Records!, 2004, BN-035)
- Static Disaster The U.K. In The Red Records Sampler CD (In The Red, 2005, ITR 1313)
- We Hate The Underground CD (The Holy Cobra Society, 2006, HCS 005)

=== CC Riders ===
- Riders CD-R (Ft. Jay Reatard, Jeffrey Evans) (Contaminated Records, 2001, no cat.no. – Limited Edition of 100)

=== Mouserocket ===
- You're Alright 7-inch (Loverly Music, 1999, cat.no.?)
- Missing Teeth 7-inch (Wrecked Em Records, 2003, wrecked 005)
- Mouserocket CD (Empty Records US, 2004, MTR-403)

=== Alicja-Pop! ===
- Shining Apple b/w Walking The Cow (Daniel Johnston) 7-inch (Certified PR Records, 2010, CPR012)
- I Play The Fool b/w Water Death 7-inch (Certified PR Records, 2011, CPR019)
- Rats: Home Recordings 2009-2013 LP (Certified PR Records, 2016, CPR036)

=== Alicja Trout ===
- Close Ur Eyes b/w James ArthurGo West Old Bastards 7-inch (Spacecase Records, 2012, SCR002)

=== Destruction Unit ===
- My Disease 7-inch (Contaminated Records/Discos Cagados, 2001, cat.no.?)
- Let's Lie 7-inch (Disordered Records/Lo-Fi Records, 2008, DISO-002.5/LF-45010)
- Self Destruction Of A Man LP/CD (Empty Records US, 2004, MTR-401)
- Death To The Old Flesh LP/CD (Empty Records US, 2006, MTR-416)

=== Nervous Patterns ===
- Nervous Patterns CD-R (Contaminated Records, 2003, no cat.no.)
- Nervous Patterns LP (Cochon Records, 2004, Coch 015)

=== River City Tanlines ===
- Black Night 7-inch (Misprint Records, 2004, msp 0150)
- Gimme Whatever 7-inch (Goodbye Boozy Records, 2005, GB 23)
- The Devil Made Me Do It 7-inch (Contaminated Records, 2005, CR 006)
- Saw You Hiding 7-inch (KenRock, 2005, KEN42)
- Black Night 7-inch (Last Day Entertainment, 2007, LDE02)
- Modern Friction 7-inch (Savage Records, 2008, SAV 7017)
- Split 7-inch w/ The Intellectuals ("In My Mode Rollin) (Gonna Puke, 2007, GPK 018)
- I'm Your Negative LP (Dirtnap Records, 2006, ZZZ 67)
- Coast to Coast LP/CD (Big Legal Mess Records(USA), 2012, and MVP Records(Europe)))

=== Black Sunday ===
- I Can't Remember 7-inch EP (Neat Neat Neat Records, 2011, NNN-005)
- Can't Keep My Hands Off You / Lights 7-inch (Disordered/Red Lounge Records, 2009)
- Split 12-inch w/ Le Jonathan Reilly (Tic Tac Totally Records, 2007, TTT-010)
- I Don't Wanna Work 7-inch (Zaxxon Records, 2006, ZR 004)
- Dancing Knives 7-inch (Misprint Records, 2006, msp 0170)
- Cut Out 7-inch (Tic Tac Totally, 2006, TTT-002)
- Gli Amanti D'Oltretomba 7-inch (Solid Sex Lovie Doll Records, 2007, SSLD 031)
- Tronic Blanc LP/CD (Dirtnap Records, 2005, ZZZ 57)
- Black Rabbit Of Death CD-R (Contaminated Records, 2006, no cat.no.)

=== Sweet Knives ===
- Sound On Sound/Strange Animals 7-inch (Red Lounge Records RLR122 2016)
- Burnt Sienna Blues/I Don't Wanna See 7-inch (Red Lounge Records RLR120 2016)

=== as Daphne Diaphanous ===
- "Guntown" on The Sore Losers Soundtrack 2×LP/CD (Sympathy For The Record Industry, 1997, SFTRI 338)

== Other sources ==
- Turn it Down Interview with Alicja
- Spin Magazine Memphis music feature
- Lost Sounds Web site
- Commercial Appeal Story
