= Jay Reatard =

American rock musician (1980–2010)

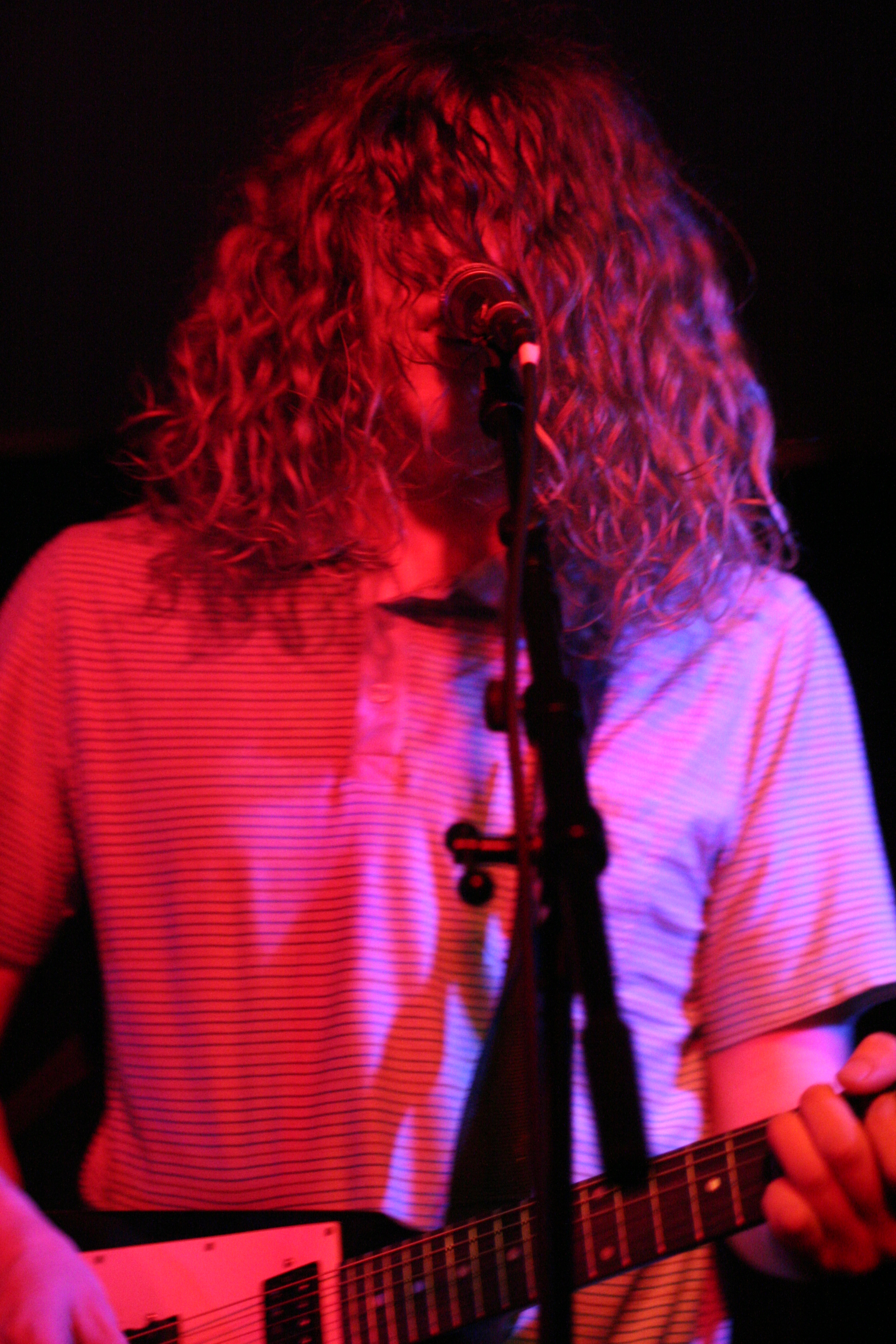
- Reatard performing in Munich, Germany in 2009
- Born: Jimmy Lee Lindsey Jr. May 1, 1980; Lilbourn, Missouri, U.S.
- Died: January 12, 2010 (aged 29); Memphis, Tennessee, U.S.
- Occupations: Musician; songwriter
- Years active: 1995–2010
- Musical career
- Genres: Garage rock; garage punk; punk rock; indie rock
- Instruments: Vocals; guitar; bass guitar; percussion; keyboards
- Labels: Matador; Shattered; In the Red; Goner
- Formerly of: The Reatards; Lost Sounds; Digital Leather

Jimmy Lee Lindsey Jr. (May 1, 1980 – January 12, 2010), known professionally as Jay Reatard, was an American rock musician from Memphis, Tennessee. He was signed to Matador Records. He released recordings as a solo artist and as a member of the Reatards and Lost Sounds.

== Life and career ==
=== Early life ===
Jimmy Lee Lindsey Jr. (Note: The Oxford American wrote that Lindsey's gravestone reads "JIMMY LEE LINDSEY JR. AKA JAY REATARD". Lindsey told Vanity Fair that his real name was Jimmy. Obituary articles have erroneously reported his first name as James, Jeremy, or Jimmie, and misspelled his last name as Lindsay.) was born in Lilbourn, Missouri on May 1, 1980. He was the third child of Jimmy Lee Lindsey Sr. and Devonna (née May), and had three sisters, Leslie, Stephanie, and Gara. Lindsey Sr. was a roofer, and Devonna worked as a respiratory therapist, though she experienced postpartum depression and stopped working shortly after Lindsey's birth. Lindsey grew up without exposure to music in his household, and his family did not own a radio or television. He moved to Memphis, Tennessee along with his parents and sisters in 1988. After their initial housing plans fell through, the family lived in a hotel for several weeks, where Lindsey stabbed himself with a needle used for drug injection while playing in the bathroom one night; he said of this incident, "My first Memphis memory is being rushed to the hospital for an AIDS test".

At age 11, Lindsey's parents divorced. He had his first musical recollection that year after purchasing a vinyl copy of Are You Experienced by the Jimi Hendrix Experience for 25 cents at a garage sale, and was captivated by hearing the electric guitar for the first time. When he was 12 or 13 years old, Lindsey began playing the acoustic guitar after a woman who owned one moved in with his father. Lindsey called Dinosaur Jr. his favorite band around this period, and their EP Whatever's Cool with Me was the first album he bought with his own money – he considered bands including Mudhoney, Nirvana, and Sonic Youth to be important to him.

During his time in junior high school, Lindsey attended school with Justin Timberlake, though the two never bonded, and Lindsey said of Timberlake, "Dude was basically in and out of regular school, anyway." Lindsey attended White Station Middle School in eighth grade, though failed to pass after several attempts. While attending for the third time, Lindsey was given the nickname "retard" by other students, after he would act "belligerently retarded in the middle of class". Lindsey dropped out of eighth grade with an incomplete acceptance record, with the school's principal telling him they would not call the authorities due to his problematic nature, as long as he ceased attending.

=== 1990s ===
His recording career began at age 15, when a homemade demo tape he sent to Goner Records caught the ear of Eric Friedl, Oblivian band member and Goner Records' owner. Lindsey heard Friedl and the Oblivians bandmates earlier that year when they returned home to Memphis as the opening act for Rocket from the Crypt. Lindsey became enamored of their sloppy, lo-fi music and created his brand of heavily distorted garage rock. Friedl was impressed by Lindsey's demos and signed him to his label, later commenting, "I loved the racket so we did the record, and I've been a fan of everything he's done since. He's a pretty amazing kid."

Lindsey named his first project the Reatards, which at the time included only himself as a member, and adopted an Oblivians-influenced surname, calling himself Jay Reatard. The Reatards' first release on Goner was the 7-inch EP Get Real Stupid, featuring Lindsey on guitar, vocals, and beating on a bucket to provide a percussive rhythm. Around this time Greg Cartwright, a member of The Oblivians, briefly played drums for Lindsey. He also played shows and recorded with Lindsey on Lindsey's first (self-released) cassette, Fuck Elvis, Here's The Reatards (No-Fi Records), with recording assistance from Jack Yarber, another Oblivian.

For Lindsey's second vinyl release, he recruited a backing band consisting of bassist Steve Albundy and drummer Elvis Wong. The Reatards' first LP as a trio was 1998's Teenage Hate on Goner Records. It was followed by a second LP, Grown Up Fucked Up on eMpTy Records (US), and a number of singles. The Reatards' first European tour came in 1998 when Lindsey was 18.

=== 2000s ===
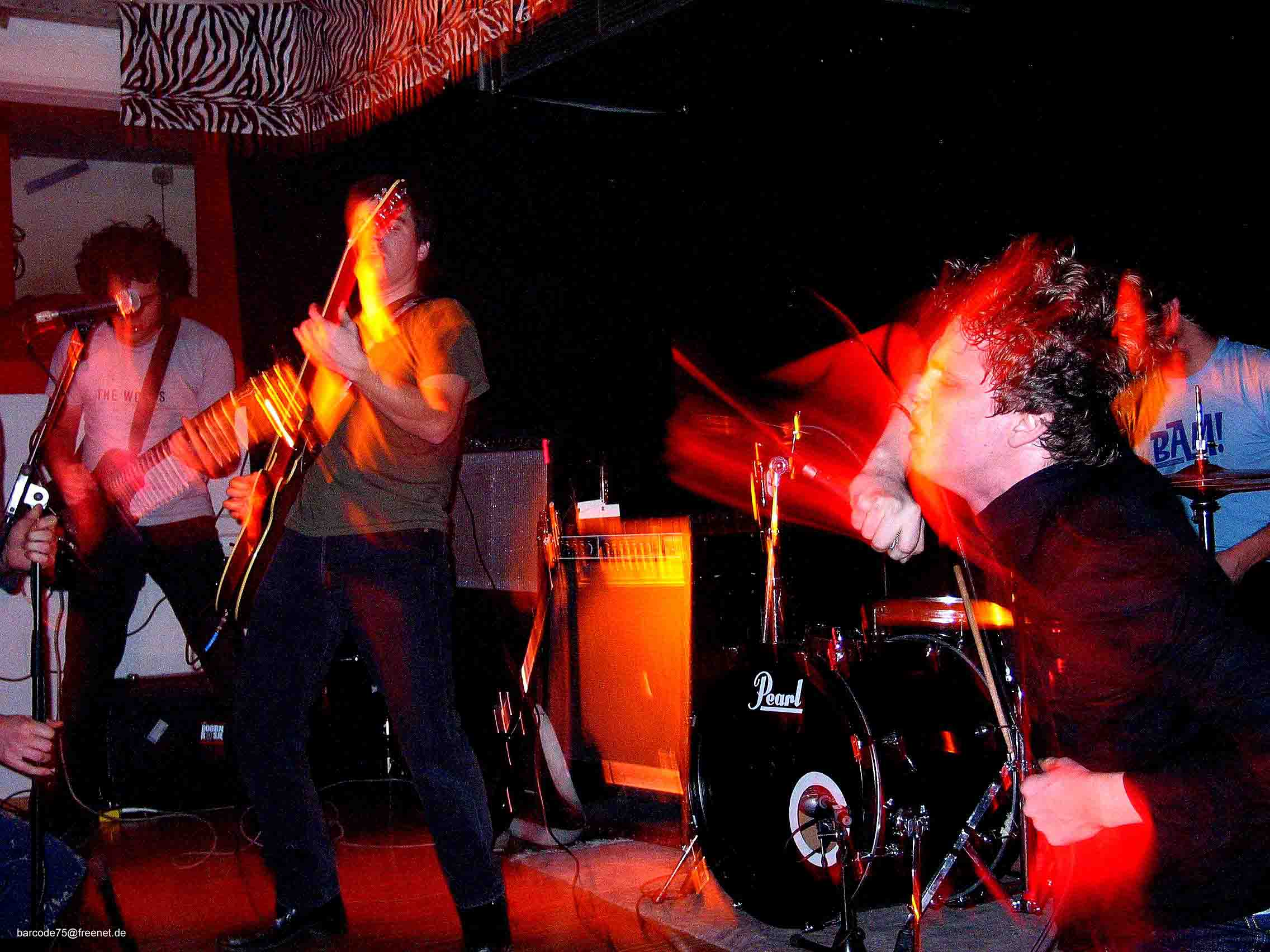
The Reatards performing in 2005 at Gleis 22 in Münster, Germany

In 2001, Lindsey began recording music with Alicja Trout and Rich Crook as the Lost Sounds, a side project, which would ultimately usurp the Reatards as Lindsey's primary musical venture. With alternating male and female vocals, as well as prominently employed synthesizers, the Lost Sounds were a departure from the guitar-driven garage rock of the Reatards and had a sound more akin to the early punk rock of The Screamers, a synthesizer-heavy punk band that Lindsey had been exposed to by Elvis Wong shortly after the recording of the Reatards' first LP. Lindsey once claimed that his time in the Lost Sounds "was and is more fun than anything else I have ever done." Yet despite Lindsey's enthusiasm for the band, the Lost Sounds bitterly broke up in 2005.

Lindsey was a prolific songwriter, often acting as a member and contributing compositions to two or more bands concurrently. One of Lindsey's first side projects was the Bad Times, a one-off band that included Eric Friedl and King Louie Bankston. The band recorded an album's worth of material after only one practice session in 1998, releasing a self-titled LP in 2001. After one live performance, the band disbanded, the members returning to their respective solo commitments.

While Lindsey was still a member of the Reatards and the Lost Sounds, he joined a side project called the Final Solutions. Lindsey's association with the future members of the Final Solutions began while he was still a teenager. Fighting problems at home, Lindsey opted to take up residence with members of a local band called the Jackmonkeys. While he was rooming with the band, he was conscripted to play drums for them at a battle of the bands, held at the school's cafeteria. With Lindsey on drums, the band, under the moniker "the High and Mightys," performed a set of Oblivians covers, earning instant hate in the competition (FS bassist Tommy Trouble's band, the Squirrels earned third place). After separating for years, the group reformed under the Final Solutions and began touring and releasing albums.

In 2004, Lindsey, together with his ex-girlfriend, Alix Brown of Atlanta rock band the Lids, formed Shattered Records, an independent record label that released mainly limited edition vinyl. Shattered Records released records for various lo-fi punk and rock bands, including Kajun SS, Jack Oblivian, Tokyo Electron, The Reatards, Final Solutions, Terror Visions, Angry Angles, Carbonas, Rat Traps, Digital Leather, and the Knaughty Knights.

In 2007, Lindsey put Shattered Records on hold while he promoted his solo records. Then in 2009, Lindsey revived the label with the "Shattered Record Club" and the announcement of his final solo album, Watch Me Fall.

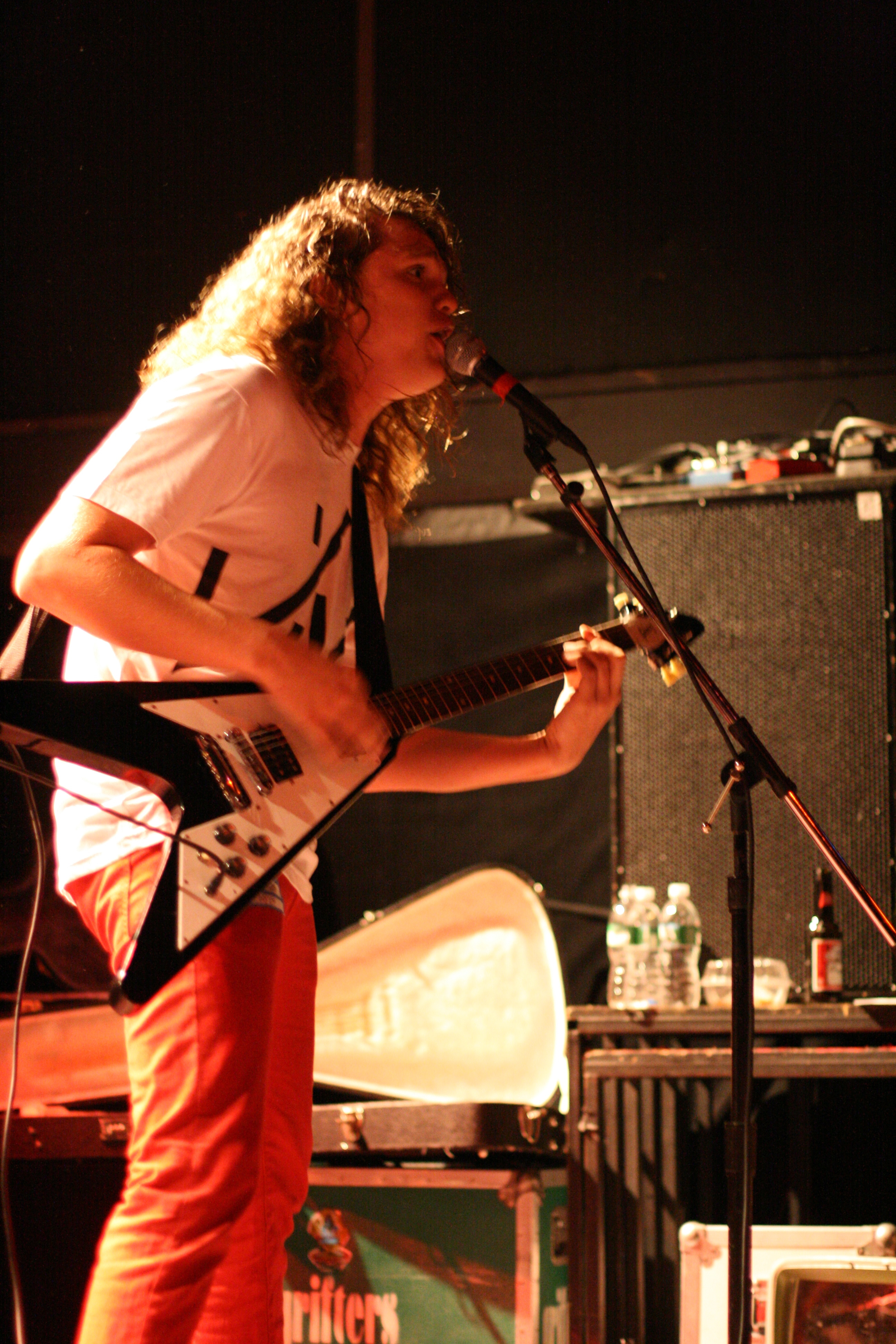
Lindsey performing at the Bowery Ballroom in 2008

This partnership was another musical endeavor for Lindsey, the Angry Angles. Together with Brown, and alternating between drummers Paul Artigues from Die Rotzz and Ryan Rousseau ('Elvis Wong') from Tokyo Electron, the band began touring the U.S. in the Fall of 2006. Before the band had even released its second single, Lindsey and Brown began a short European tour. The Angry Angles disbanded after releasing several vinyl singles.

By 2005, both the Reatards and the Lost Sounds had broken up, and Lindsey focused his attention on a handful of side projects, working with and releasing material under Terror Visions and Destruction Unit. Though after he began focusing on his solo career in 2006, Lindsey said he has no desire to reform his previous bands. "I'd just feel like I was going backwards if I worked on anything else," Lindsey said.

2006 saw the release of Blood Visions (In the Red), Lindsey's first solo album under the moniker Jay Reatard. After a lengthy tour supporting his solo album, in 2008, he signed a multi-album, exclusive deal with the New York-based indie label Matador Records. Lindsey chose Matador because he felt they were "the only ones keeping any of the promises they'd made along the way." Various major labels like Universal Records, Columbia Records, and Vice Records along with independent Fat Possum wanted to meet with him in the hopes of signing him. He released six limited, 7-inch singles throughout 2008 with Matador. Soon after the release of the first single and write-ups in NME, Spin Magazine, and Rolling Stone, Lindsey began playing larger shows and various music festivals all over the world.

"My Shadow" was featured in MLB 2K8.

In October 2008, Lindsey's Matador Singles '08 LP compiled all six of the 2008 singles on one LP/CD. Lindsey again hit the road to support the album with a second, extensive 2008 tour. Lindsey's later records sound drastically different from his early punk records. He said writers often misinterpret his newer sound. "I just think it's noisy pop music," Lindsey said.

Lindsey's final album, Watch Me Fall (his first proper studio album with Matador), was released in August 2009. He described this collection of songs as more melodic and twee-inspired. In a 2009 interview, Lindsey said "these new batch of songs feature organ, some mandolins, a cello, a lot more back-ups and harmonies." He noted that he'd "become a little bit more about the melodies... I think I stripped away a layer of the fuzz; I might have been challenging people before to find them and this time I might be making them a little bit more obvious."

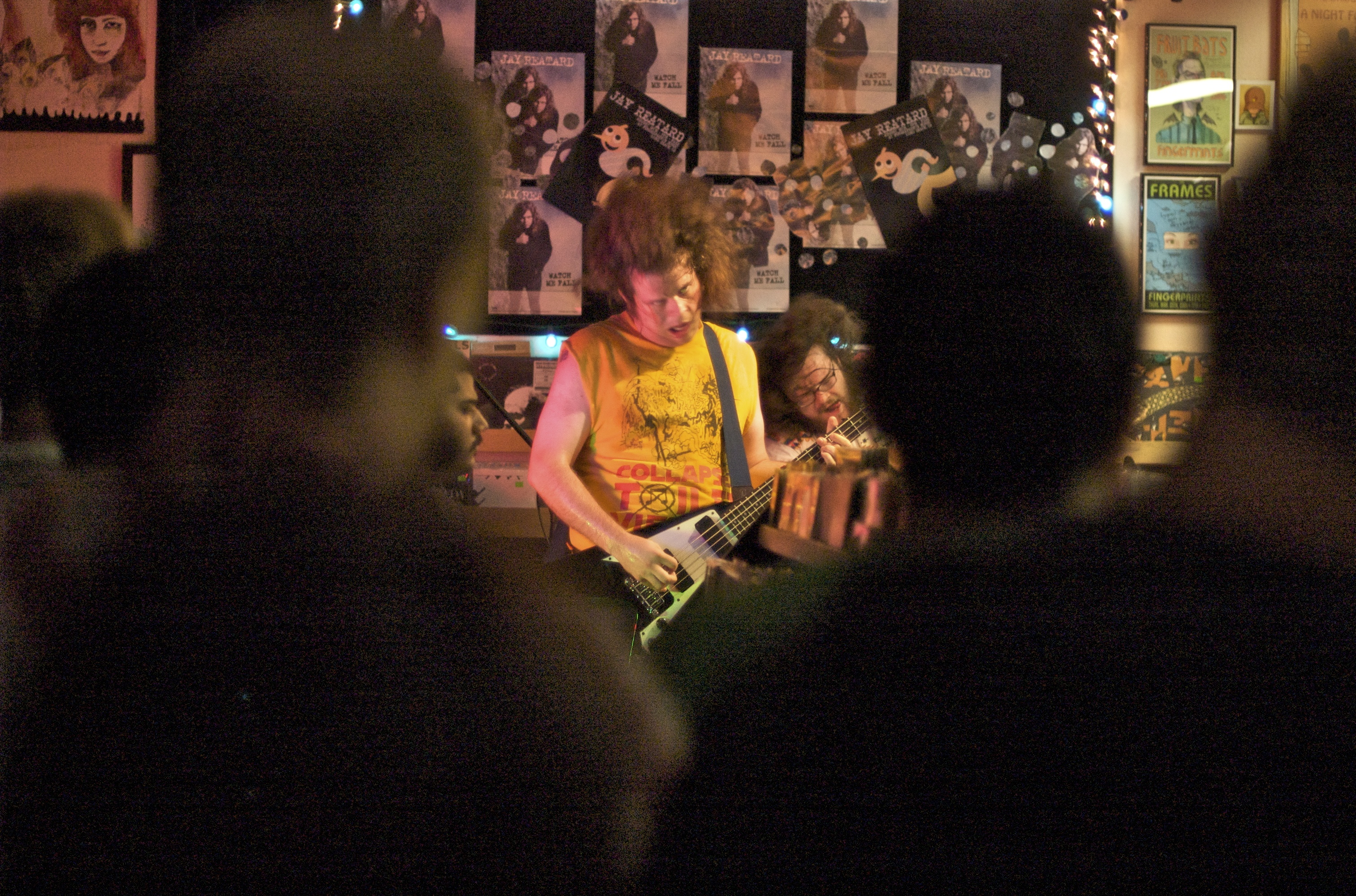
Lindsey performing at Fingerprints on August 2009

While he claimed Watch Me Fall was more mellow than his previous works, Lindsey said his live show would remain energetic. "I just want it to be like an assault live, and softer on records," he said. In an August 2009 interview with Turn it Down Interviews, Lindsey said the album's lyrics are centered around his growing fear of death and the betrayal of close friends.

After the release of Watch Me Fall, Lindsey contributed to a tribute album for New Zealand rock and roll musician Chris Knox, with whom he was to collaborate until Knox suffered a stroke in June 2009. He recorded a cover of the Toy Love song, "Pull Down the Shades". All proceeds from the album will go towards Knox's recovery.

Lindsey's band (that consisted of members of another Memphis band, The Barbaras) quit playing with Lindsey around October 5, 2009, although specific details were not released. He finished the dates he had previously booked with replacement players, the bassist and drummer of the Danish band Cola Freaks (da), with whom he had previously toured.

Lindsey appeared on a Nirvana In Utero tribute limited release record on April 19, 2014, during Record Store Day. Lindsey played "Frances Farmer Will Have Her Revenge on Seattle" and was one of the last recordings before his death.

=== Death ===
Lindsey was found dead in his home in the Cooper-Young neighborhood of Midtown, Memphis, around 3:30 a.m. on Wednesday, January 13, 2010, at the age of 29. He was found in his bed by a roommate. A statement was posted on the website of Goner Records that Lindsey had died in his sleep. Friends of Lindsey stated that he had recently complained of flu-like symptoms. An autopsy was performed by the Shelby County medical examiner. Memphis's Commercial Appeal reported on February 3 that Lindsey had died of "cocaine toxicity, and that alcohol was a contributing factor in his death."

MyFox Memphis reported that police had begun a homicide investigation and were actively looking for a possible suspect. The report was later removed from the TV station's website.

A memorial was held for Lindsey on Saturday, January 16 in Memphis at Memorial Park Funeral Home, attended by family and friends. Musician and friend Eric Friedl, founder of Goner Records, and bandmate Stephen Pope eulogized Lindsey. One of Lindsey's trademark white Gibson Flying V guitars hung behind his coffin at the funeral home; he was buried with the guitar the next day at Memorial Park Cemetery.

Reatard's final single, recorded just days before he died, "You Get No Love/I Am Growing", was released posthumously in March 2011. In a 2009 interview, he made references to several unreleased songs recorded for his final album, Watch Me Fall. Additionally, several of his bands released demos, unreleased songs, and alternate versions recorded with him in the years after his death.

A feature-length documentary film titled Better Than Something: Jay Reatard was released in March 2012. The film, made by New York City filmmakers Alex Hammond and Ian Markiewicz, is an elaboration of their short film Waiting For Something. The film predominantly features footage shot with Lindsey in April 2009, along with never before seen concert and home video footage, and cameos from many of Lindsey's family members and colleagues. Better Than Something: Jay Reatard premiered at the Nashville Film Festival in Nashville, Tennessee in April 2011.

In January 2012, Lindsey's manager Adam Shore collaborated with the Yellow Bird Project to create a memorial T-shirt. The design is based on a photograph of Lindsey's Gibson Flying V, with the initials 'JR' added to the headstock. All profits from the sale of this T-shirt have benefited St. Jude Children's Research Hospital, a Memphis-based charity designated by Lindsey's father.

In 2012, Memphis band The Barbaras (whose members Billy Hayes and Stephen Pope were members of Jay's live band), released their only album 2006-2008, which Reatard helped produce.

In 2014, the French label Teenage Hate Records released a French Tribute to Jay Reatard with 14 French bands. Cheveu, Magnetix, Kap Bambino, Bikini Machine & Didier Wampas, The Liminanas and few more release a cover for the records.

In 2020, the label Retard Records released Jay Reatard - A Canadian Tribute with 11 artists.

== Discography ==
- Blood Visions (2006)
- Watch Me Fall (2009)
