= Melissa's Garage Revisited =

Studio album by Oblivians, Walter Daniels, Monsieur Jeffrey Evans
- Released: 1999
- Recorded: April 19–20, 1995
- Genre: Garage rock
- Length: 26:13
- Label: Sympathy for the Record Industry

Oblivians, Walter Daniels, Monsieur Jeffrey Evans chronology
Best of the Worst: 93-97 (1999)	Melissa's Garage Revisited (1999)	Desperation (2013)

Professional ratings
Review scores
Source	Rating
Allmusic	link

Melissa's Garage Revisited is an album released by Memphis garage-rock band the Oblivians. The album features Austin-based harmonicist Walter Daniels and Memphis-based vocalist Jeffrey Evans. The album was originally released as an EP in 1995 by Texas record label, Undone. When released as an EP, the album was titled Walter Daniels Plays with Monsieur Jeffrey Evans & The Oblivians at Melissa's Garage. For the rerelease, the title was shortened and four new tracks from a '68 Comeback 7" were appended.

== Track listing ==
1. It Don't Take Too Much - 3:53
2. Rockin' in the Graveyard - 2:53
3. Don't Worry - 2:31
4. Dearest Darling - 3:46
5. We're Not in It to Lose - 1:58

(Additional tracks added for rerelease)

1. Someday My Prince Will Come - 3:22
2. The Darker the Berry - 2:03
3. Sticks and Stones - 3:32
4. Bending Like a Willow Tree - 3:15

== Credits ==
- Greg Oblivian - Guitar, vocals, drums
- Jack Oblivian - Guitar, vocals, drums
- Eric Oblivian - Guitar, vocals, drums
- Monsieur Jeffrey Evans - Guitar, vocals
- Walter Daniels - Harmonica, vocals
