= Greg Cartwright =

American singer-songwriter and guitarist

- Also known as: Greg Oblivian
- Born: March 18, 1972 (age 54); Memphis, Tennessee, US
- Genres: Garage rock, punk rock, R&B
- Occupations: Singer, songwriter
- Instruments: Vocals, guitar, drums
- Years active: 1990–present
- Labels: Merge Records, In the Red Records, Crypt Records, Goner Records, Sympathy for the Record Industry, Norton Records

Gregory Johnathon Cartwright, also known by his stage name Greg Oblivian (born March 18, 1972), is an American singer, songwriter, and guitarist from Memphis, Tennessee. From 2001 to 2022 he fronted Reigning Sound which was signed to Merge Records. After moving away from Memphis in the mid-2000s, he has since lived with his family in Asheville, North Carolina.

Cartwright is also a founding member of the Memphis '90s garage bands The Compulsive Gamblers, The Oblivians and Greg Oblivian & the Tip Tops.

As of 2019, Cartwright has reformed his past band Greg Oblivian & the Tip Tops and is playing shows.

Aside from also playing occasional solo performances (including one that led to his solo record "Live at Circle A"), Cartwright also plays in The Parting Gifts, a band also featuring Lindsay "CoCo" Hames of The Ettes and Patrick Keeler of The Raconteurs and The Greenhornes, and a guest appearance from Dan Auerbach of the Black Keys. The band's debut album, "Strychnine Dandelion," was released in September 2010 on In the Red Records.

Cartwright has also played in a handful of other bands, including guitarist in The Detroit Cobras and as drummer for '68 Comeback. He has also collaborated with The Deadly Snakes, contributing to their album I'm Not Your Soldier Anymore.

In 2007, he wrote songs and co-produced Dangerous Game, a comeback album by Mary Weiss of The Shangri-Las.

== Early years ==
Born in 1972, Cartwright was raised in Frayser, Memphis – a neighborhood located on the north side of Memphis. His last two years of high school were spent in the suburbs after his family relocated outside of the city. His father was a factory worker, employed by the Firestone tire company in Memphis.

With his parents' busy work schedule, Cartwright spent his summer vacations and weekends at his grandmother's Memphis home. This is where he was first introduced to musical instruments.

At six years old, Cartwright already owned a portable record player, and was introduced to rock and roll music by his father's record collection, which included a huge catalog of British Invasion albums and other 1950s and 1960s rock bands. Around this time he also inherited his aunt and uncle's 45 rpm collections, which according to Cartwright, included a lot of "oddball Memphis stuff you wouldn't hear on the radio." After becoming exposed to music, Cartwright began writing songs and forming bands as early as seventh grade.

By his teens, Cartwright was becoming drawn to other, more abrasive and on-the-fringe genres of music. He also began going to punk rock shows at the Antenna Club, a now defunct Memphis music venue. At the Antenna is where he first saw a Tav Falco's Panther Burns show when he was 16 years old. Panther Burns is fronted by Tav Falco, a '50s-style Memphis rocker who blends blues with rockabilly and soul music – a mix that most touring punk bands were not playing in the 1980s. That show nudged him in the direction that would ultimately lead him toward the garage-punk, soul and country sound he is known for.

Cartwright recalled that Tav Falco show in a 2009 interview with Turn it Down Interviews:

"It instantly clicked with me," Cartwright said. "Although it was chaotic, there was definitely a wild, almost punk element about Tav Falco & Panther Burns. Tav was into all the kind of stuff that really turned me on. That was Tav's thing – blues, rockabilly, country, odd R&B. Suddenly I thought I’ve been wasting my time trying to like hardcore punk and here's this thing that was in my own backyard that I was totally unaware of. From there on I started looking for more bands like that. Then you get into The Cramps and all of these other things that kind of ride that line, that are really good, gritty rock'n'roll, but are also on the outside of culture, like punk. So that was a real eye opener. I continued to hunt records in thrift stores and junk shops."

After that show, Cartwright would begin heavily collecting rare garage, country, soul and doo-wop records – and also formed a few high school bands. It was at that point his style began to take shape. Shortly after finishing high school he would meet Jack Yarber and form his first notable band, The Compulsive Gamblers. Cartwright and Yarber would also form The Oblivians in 1993, along with another Memphis musician, Eric Friedl, who now owns Goner Records.

=== Compulsive Gamblers ===
Cartwright started taking his music more seriously in the late '80s when he formed the Memphis garage-rock outfit "The Painkillers." Fellow Memphis native Jack Yarber was the other key figure in the band. After the addition of keyboardist Philip "Flipper" Tubb, drummer Rod "Bushrod" Thomas, and fiddler Greg Easterly, the new lineup was rechristened "The Compulsive Gamblers" and work began on their first four-song EP, Joker, which was recorded in 1991 in a friend's kitchen. The album was released a year later, and was followed by two further vinyl singles, "Church Goin'" and "Goodtime Gamblers." By 1995, after the relocation of Thomas and Easterly to New Orleans, the band was finding it difficult to stay together and was forced to split up. Their recordings were compiled on CD under the title Gambling Days are Over, released in 1995 by Sympathy for the Record Industry.

During the summer and fall of 2009 The Compulsive Gamblers played two reunion shows in Memphis, TN. One show was an Antenna Club Reunion Show (a tribute to the defunct Memphis rock venue). The other show was at GonerFest 6, an annual punk rock festival hosted by Goner Records.

=== Oblivians ===
Cartwright's next band, again with Yarber, and with the addition of Eric Friedl, was the garage-rock outfit, The Oblivians. Formed in 1993 out of the ashes of the Compulsive Gamblers, the Oblivians took a more primitive, punk-influenced approach to rock and roll. Each member served as singer, guitarist, and drummer, switching between instruments and vocal duties during performances. In 1995 the band released its first album, Soul Food. This was followed in 1996 by Sympathy Sessions, a compilation album featuring a collection of songs recorded with Doug Easley for the record label Sympathy for the Record Industry. The Oblivians released their second album, Popular Favorites, in 1996, and their third and final album, ...Play Nine Songs with Mr. Quintron, in 1997. In 2009, The Oblivians reunited for a European tour with The Gories. The bands kicked off the tour in their hometowns, Memphis and Detroit, they also played at the VICE Garage Fest in Lawrence Kansas in Oct 2010.

=== Greg Oblivian and the Tip Tops ===
During the breakup of the Oblivians in 1997, Cartwright released 1997's "Head Shop" LP under the moniker Greg Oblivian & the Tip Tops. The album, which featured Cartwright's wife Esther on drums and guest spots by Jack Yarber, is a lo-fi record that featured the first, more mellow version of The Oblivians fan-favorite "Bad Man." The song "Twice as Deep" is featured in the cult zombie film Wild Zero.

=== Reformation of the Gamblers ===
In 1999, Cartwright and Yarber reformed the Compulsive Gamblers, this time as a three piece, with Rod Thomas on drums. In this incarnation they released the 1999 album Bluff City. With the addition of keyboardist Brendan Lee Spengler and bassist Jeff Meier, the group released the studio album Crystal Gazing Luck Amazing and the live album Live & Deadly: Memphis-Chicago before again disbanding. The band also reunited for two shows in Memphis, TN during the summer and fall of 2009.

=== Reigning Sound ===
While still a member of the Oblivians, Cartwright had begun to amass a number of songs he deemed too moody or melancholy to be released under the Oblivians moniker. These songs would eventually become the basis for his next band, Reigning Sound, a more R&B-focused act. The original version of the band consisted of Cartwright, Alex Greene (guitar/keyboards, vocals), Jeremy Scott (bass, vocals), and Greg Roberson (drums). With Reigning Sound, Cartwright released the 2001 album, Break Up, Break Down and the 2002 album Time Bomb High School. In 2004, Reigning Sound released Too Much Guitar, an album recorded live at Cartwright's Memphis record store Legba Records, which harkened back to Cartwright's earlier, harsher Oblivians sound.

2005 saw the release of three non-studio albums. There were two live albums: "Live at Maxwells" (Spoonful) and "Live at Goner Records" (Goner). The other release was an outtakes compilation, Home For Orphans (Sympathy) – which has two slower, moodier versions of tracks from Too Much Guitar.

In 2007 he co-produced and wrote nine out of 14 songs for Dangerous Game – an album by Mary Weiss of the '60s girl-group the Shangri-Las. It was released by Norton Records. Reigning Sound released Love and Curses (In the Red Records) on August 10, 2009. This was the first studio album featuring the new lineup of members, and was mainly recorded in Asheville, NC. In 2010 Reigning Sound contributed a cover of "Mind Over Matter" for the Daddy Rockin Strong: A Tribute to Nolan Strong & The Diablos (The Wind Records / Norton Records). Cartwright, a Nolan Strong fan, previously covered "I Want to Be Your Happiness," another Strong cover, on The Compulsive Gamblers "Crystal, Gazing, Luck, Amazing" LP.

Cartwright, along with CoCo Hames of The Ettes, collaborated and formed The Parting Gifts. The band shares songwriting duties and recorded an album, "Strychnine Dandelion" (In the Red Recordings). The band's debut single, "Walking Thru The Sleepy City," a Rolling Stones cover, was released in October 2010 by Norton Records.

In a June 8, 2022, message on the group's Facebook page, Cartwright formally announced the end of Reigning Sound. He wrote, "It was my intention with A Little More Time to come full circle, reunite the original lineup of the band, and finish where we started. I thought we could support the album with some touring and go out on a high note, but Covid has proven to be a long-lasting concern and more difficult to navigate than anyone could have anticipated. Rather than compromise ourselves or our fans, I have decided this is the right time to dissolve the band."

=== Solo performances ===
Cartwright began playing periodic solo performances at venues around 2003. A 2006 performance at the Circle A, a small club in Milwaukee, was recorded and released by Dusty Medical Records in 2009 as Greg Cartwright: "Live at the Circle A". The album, like many of his performances, features songs from each of Cartwright's bands, and some cover songs. The album came about by chance after Cartwright was already in Milwaukee recording an album for The Goodnight Loving. The vinyl album, which is also available for digital download came accompanied with a free vinyl 7-inch, featuring The Goodnight Loving acting as Cartwright's backing band.

=== Producer ===
Cartwright has acted as producer for a number of bands since his solo career began. He has produced albums by The Ettes, Mary Weiss, Mr. Airplane Man, Porch Ghouls, The Cuts, Detroit Cobras, The Horrors, The Deadly Snakes, Goodnight Loving, and Andre Williams.

=== Legba Records ===
For a time, Cartwright was the owner of Legba Records, an independent music store in the Cooper-Young District of Memphis. Legba Records served as a makeshift studio for the recording of the Reigning Sound's album, Too Much Guitar. When Cartwright relocated to Asheville, North Carolina, Legba Records changed hands and became a Goner Records store, home to the independent record label of former Oblivians bandmate Eric Friedl.

== Discography ==
=== As the Compulsive Gamblers ===
Singles

- Joker 7" (Boiler Room, 1992, cat.no.?)
- Church Goin' 7" (Lemon Peel Records, 1992, LP001 – LP002)
- Goodtime Gamblers 7" (Boiler Room, 1995, BR 002)

Albums

- Gambling Days are Over CD (Sympathy for the Record Industry, 1995, SFTRI 372)
- Bluff City LP/CD (Sympathy for the Record Industry, 1999, SFTRI 570)
- Crystal Gazing Luck Amazing LP/CD (Sympathy for the Record Industry, 2000, SFTRI 572)
- Live & Deadly: Memphis-Chicago 2xLP/CD (Sympathy for the Record Industry, 2003, SFTRI 698)
- (Appear on one song on): Andre Williams Is The Black Godfather LP/CD (In The Red, 2000, ITR 065)

=== As the Oblivians ===
Singles

- Call The Shots 7" (Goner Records, 1993, 2Gone)
- Sunday You Need Love 7" (Crypt, 1994, CR-044)
- Now for the Hard Of Hearing From ... "Blow Their Cool" 7" (Estrus, 1994, ES 756)
- Static Party 7" (In The Red, 1994, ITR 018)
- Go!Pill-Popper! 7" (Drug Racer, 1996, 001)
- Strong Come On 7" (Crypt, 1996, CR-053)
- Kick Your Ass 7" (Sympathy for the Record Industry, 1996, SFTRI 412)

Splits

- Split CS with Impala (Goner Records/Power Of Bob, 1993, 0Gone/POB 103)
- Split 7" with Two Bo's Maniacs (Hate Records, 1997, hate 7)
- Split 7" with the Crime Kaisers (Active Detective, 1998, active detective record #1)

EP's

- Never Enough 10" (Sympathy for the Record Industry, 1994, SFTRI 304)
- Six of the Best 10" (Sympathy for the Record Industry, 1996, SFTRI 383)
- Walter Daniels Plays With Monsieur Jeffrey Evans & The Oblivians at Melissa's Garage 10" (Undone, 1995, UDR-0008-10)

Albums

- Soul Food LP/CD (Crypt, 1995, CR-055)
- Live in Atlanta 8.19.94 LP (Negro Records, 1995, negro records 001)
- Sympathy Sessions CD (Sympathy for the Record Industry, 1996, SFTRI 406)
- Popular Favorites LP/CD (Crypt, 1996, CR-065)
- ...Play Nine Songs with Mr. Quintron LP/CD (Crypt, 1997, CR-082)
- 17 Cum Shots LP (Bootleg, 1997, cat.no.?)
- Best of the Worst: 93–97 2xLP/CD (Sympathy for the Record Industry, 1999, SFTRI 584)
- On The Go LP (Goner Records, 2003, 12Gone)
- Barristers 95 [Live] (In the Red, 2009, ITR 182)
- Desperation LP/CD (In The Red, 2013, ITR 238)

=== As Greg Oblivian and the Tip Tops ===
Singles

- Pretty Baby 7" (Sympathy for the Record Industry, 1998, SFTRI 534)

Albums

- Head Shop LP/CD (Sympathy for the Record Industry, 1998, SFTRI 513)

=== As Greg Cartwright and the Young Seniors ===
Singles

- Moola Man 7" (Ghost Highway Recordings, 2010, GHR-07)

=== As Reigning Sound ===
Singles

- Two Sides To Every Man 7" (Sympathy for the Record Industry, 2001, SFTRI 656)
- If Christmas Won't Bring You Home 7" (Norton Records, 2004, 45–121)
- I'll Cry 7" (Slovenly Recordings, 2005, 702–50)
- Reigning Sound in Memphis 7" (Norton Records, 2006, 45–128)

Splits

- Split 7" with the Henchmen (Norton Records, 2003, 9642)

Albums

- Break Up, Break Down LP/CD (Sympathy for the Record Industry, 2001, SFTRI 654)
- Time Bomb High School LP (In The Red, 2002, ITR 084)
- Too Much Guitar LP/CD (In The Red, 2004, ITR 107)
- Home For Orphans LP/CD (Sympathy for the Record Industry, 2005, SFTRI 736)
- Live at Maxwell's LP (Spoonful Records, 2005, LP-SR-005)
- Live at Goner Records 6.26.05 LP/CD (Goner Records, 2005, 21Gone)
- Love and Curses LP/CD (In The Red, 2009, ITR 155)
- Abdication ... For Your Love EP (Scion, 2011)
- Shattered LP/CD (Merge, 2014)
- A Little More Time With Reigning Sound LP/CD (Merge, 2021)
- Memphis In June LP (Merge, 2022)

=== Compilations ===
- Root Damage 2xLP/2xCD (Sympathy for the Record Industry, 2003, SFTRI 713)

track: As Long As You Come Home

- Revolver Sampler Winter 2003 CD (Revolver, 2003, cat.no.?)

track: Straight Shooter

- Broad Daylight Soundtrack CD (Guerrilla Monster Films, 2003, #12300)

track: Medication

- Superfuzz CD (Lowfly Records, 2005, LF 061)

track: I'll Cry

- Static Disaster The U.K.: In The Red Records Sampler CD (In The Red, 2005, ITR 1313)

track: Drowning

- Daddy Rockin Strong: A Tribute to Nolan Strong & The Diablos (The Wind / Norton Records, 2010, TWR002 LP)

track: Mind Over Matter

=== Greg Cartwright ===
'Singles'

- Live At WMSE 7" (with Goodnight Loving) (Dusty Medical Records, 2009, DMR-18)
- Tin Ten 7" (Dusty Medical Records, 2017, DMR-50)

'Albums'

- Live At Circle A LP (Dusty Medical Records, 2009, DMR-18) *accompanied by 7" (same catalog number)

=== with Deadly Snakes ===
'Albums'

- I'm Not Your Soldier Anymore (In The Red, 2001, ITR 77)
