= Greg Roberson =

- Born: Memphis, Tennessee, U.S.
- Genres: Garage rock, punk rock, R&B
- Occupations: radio host, radio DJ, drummer, producer, record label owner
- Instrument: drums
- Years active: 1980s – present
- Labels: Trashy Creatures; In the Red Records; Sympathy for the Record Industry; Norton Records
- Website: http://trashycreatures.com

Greg Roberson is an American, Memphis, Tennessee-based session drummer, songwriter, producer, independent-record-label owner, and SiriusXM Radio host since 2004. From 2023 to 2026, Greg hosted Deep Tracks with Greg Roberson., consisting of 7 six hour shows a week. The show focused on classic rock's "lesser played songs and forgotten gems." Although his last show was on April 10, 2026, Greg does fill in for Earle Bailey from time to time on Deep Tracks.

Outside of radio, Roberson currently operates the independent record label Trashy Creatures Records and is the drummer in Tiger High, a Memphis-based psychedelic garage-rock quartet. He also leads the bands The Trashed Romeos, Hot Freak Nation, and Her Majesty's Buzz. He is also the original drummer for Reigning Sound and still performs with the band at periodic "Memphis lineup" reunion shows.

== Career ==
While he is well known as a SiriusXM radio host, Roberson is also a musician and has performed and recorded with many Memphis and international recording artists. In the early 2000s, he was a founding member of the Memphis garage band Reigning Sound alongside songwriter Greg Cartwright. Roberson also performed and/or recorded with the Compulsive Gamblers, Knaughty Knights, Lover!, Arthur Lee’s Love, Jim Dickinson, Jack Oblivian & the Tennessee Tearjerkers, Ross Johnson & Jeffrey Evans, Her Majesty's Buzz, Melissa Dunn, Wreckless Eric, Phil Seymour of the Dwight Twilley Band, and others.

Over the years Roberson has been a songwriter, producer, and session musician for various projects. He currently owns and operates the independent record label Trashy Creatures Records based in Memphis. He has also led two studio side projects featuring his Tiger High bandmates: The Trashed Romeos and Hot Freak Nation.
