= Break Up, Break Down =

Studio album by Reigning Sound
- Released: May 15, 2001
- Genres: Alternative country, garage rock
- Length: 35:33
- Label: Sympathy for the Record Industry
- Producer: Greg Cartwright

Reigning Sound chronology
| Break Up, Break Down (2001) | Time Bomb High School (2002) |

Professional ratings
Review scores
| Source | Rating |
|---|---|
| AllMusic | 4/5 stars |

Break Up, Break Down is the first studio album by the Reigning Sound. It was released on May 15, 2001, by Sympathy for the Record Industry.

The album was the band's second release, following their debut 7" single "Two Sides to Every Man," by three months. Its country-folk melodies stood in stark contrast to some of frontman Greg Cartwright's earlier work with bands such as the Compulsive Gamblers and the Oblivians, and set an early blueprint for the sound the band would explore on their subsequent releases.

Break Up, Break Down featured the first incarnation of the Reigning Sound; Greg Cartwright on lead vocals and guitar; Alex Greene on organ, piano, guitar, and backing vocals; Jeremy Scott on bass and backing vocals; and Greg Roberson on drums.

== Track listing ==
1. "Since When" - 2:23
2. "I Don't Care" - 2:33
3. "You Don't Hear the Music" - 3:11
4. "Goodbye" - 3:51
5. "As Long" - 2:59
6. "Want You" - 2:51
7. "So Goes Love" - 2:34
8. "Take a Ride" - 4:43
9. "Waiting for the Day" - 3:28
10. "So Sad" - 3:24
11. "I'm So Thankful" - 3:01

== Personnel ==
- The Reigning Sound - Main Performer
- Greg Cartwright - Guitar, Vocals, Producer
- Jeremy Scott - Bass
- Alex Greene - Organ, Vocals (Background)
- Greg Roberson - Drums
- John Whittemore - Guitar, Steel Guitar (2,5)
- Stuart Sikes - Engineer
- Tripp Lamkins (Grifters) - cover design
