= Live in Atlanta (disambiguation) =

Live in Atlanta may refer to:

- Live in Atlanta, an album by Destiny's Child
- Frozen in the Moment: Live in Atlanta an album by Redemption
- Rock'n Roll Holiday: Live in Atlanta, an album by Oblivians
