= Home for Orphans =

Compilation album by Reigning Sound
- Released: September 13, 2005
- Genre: Garage punk
- Length: 28:21
- Label: Sympathy for the Record Industry

Reigning Sound chronology
Too Much Guitar (2004)	Home for Orphans (2005)	Live at Goner Records (2005)

Professional ratings
Review scores
Source	Rating
Allmusic	link

Home for Orphans is a compilation album by the Reigning Sound. It was released in 2005 on Sympathy for the Record Industry. The album features the original Reigning Sound lineup of Greg Cartwright on lead vocals and guitar; Alex Greene on organ, piano, guitar, and backing vocals; Jeremy Scott on bass, and backing vocals; and Greg Roberson on drums. . This album mainly consists of slower, moodier outtakes from the Too Much Guitar recording sessions, as well as some covers, including "Without You," a Gene Clark cover. An alternate version of "If Christmas Can't Bring You Home" (originally released on a 45 rpm by Norton Records), a Reigning Sound original holiday song, also appears.

== Track listing ==
1. "Find Me Now" (Cartwright) – 2:14
2. "If You Can't Give Me Everything" (Cartwright) – 3:48
3. "Funny Thing" (Cartwright) – 3:07
4. "Medication Blues #1" (Cartwright) – 3:43
5. "Carol" (Cartwright) – 2:21
6. "What Could I Do?" (Cartwright) – 2:37
7. "If Christmas Can't Bring You Home" (Cartwright) – 2:28
8. "Pretty Girl" (Cartwright) – 2:51
9. "Without You" (Clark) – 2:43
10. "Don't Send Me No Flowers, I Ain't Dead Yet" [live] (Weiss) – 2:29

== Credits ==
- Reigning Sound – Main performer
- Greg Cartwright – Guitar, producer, vocals
- Alex Greene – Organ, guitar, vocals (background)
- Jeremy Scott – Bass, vocals (background), vocals
- Greg Roberson – Drums
