= Stormy Weather (song) =

Song written by Harold Arlen and Ted Koehler in 1933

Song
- Published: 1933 by Mills Music
- Genre: torch song
- Composer: Harold Arlen
- Lyricist: Ted Koehler

"Stormy Weather" is a 1933 torch song written by Harold Arlen and Ted Koehler. Ethel Waters first sang it at The Cotton Club night club in Harlem in 1933 and recorded it with the Dorsey Brothers' Orchestra under Brunswick Records that year, and in the same year it was sung in London by Elisabeth Welch and recorded by Frances Langford. Also in 1933, for the first time the entire floor revue from Harlem's Cotton Club went on tour, playing theatres in principal cities. The revue was originally called The Cotton Club Parade of 1933 but for the road tour it was changed to Stormy Weather Revue; it contained the song "Stormy Weather", which was sung by Adelaide Hall.

In September 1933, the group Comedian Harmonists released their German cover version, titled "Ohne Dich" ("Without You") with lyrics that are quite different. The song has since been performed by Frank Sinatra, Judy Garland, Etta James, Ella Fitzgerald, Dinah Washington, Clodagh Rodgers, Reigning Sound, Lena Horne, Billie Holiday, The Spaniels, Willie Hutch, Jeff Lynne, Bob Dylan and others. Leo Reisman's orchestra version had the biggest hit on records (with Arlen himself as vocalist), although Ethel Waters' recorded version also sold well. "Stormy Weather" was performed by Horne in the 1943 film Stormy Weather, a big, all-star show for World War II soldiers.

The song tells of disappointment, as the lyrics, "Don't know why there's no sun up in the sky", show someone pining for her man to return. The weather is a metaphor for the feelings of the singer: "stormy weather since my man and I ain't together, keeps raining all the time".

The original handwritten lyrics, along with a painting by Ted Koehler, were featured on the US version of Antiques Roadshow on January 24, 2011, where they were appraised for between $50,000 and $100,000. The lyrics show a number of crossings out and corrections.

Ethel Waters' recording of the song in 1933 was inducted in the Grammy Hall of Fame in 2003, and the Library of Congress added it to the National Recording Registry in 2004. Also in 2004, Horne's version finished at number 30 on AFI's 100 Years...100 Songs survey of top tunes in American movies.

According to the Acoustic Music organization, the version by the Five Sharps (1952) "is one of the rarest of all R&B records. Only three 78rpm and no 45rpm copies are known to exist".

== Notable recordings ==
- Ethel Waters – 1933
- Duke Ellington – 1933 and another version with singer Ivie Anderson in 1940. He also performed a vocal version with Ivy (aka Ivie) Anderson in the 1933 Paramount short film Bundle of Blues.
- Harold Arlen – 1933
- The Comedian Harmonists – Recorded both a French-language version titled "Quand il pleut" ("When it Rains") and a German-language version titled "Ohne Dich" ("Without You").
- Lena Horne recorded the song in 1941 for RCA Victor. In 1943, she recorded another version for the movie Stormy Weather. She recorded the song at least five times throughout her career, including for the 1957 album Stormy Weather. Her original 1941 version of the song was inducted into the Grammy Hall of Fame in 2000. A version reached No. 4 for 2 weeks in Canada's AC charts in March 1982.
- Billie Holiday with Lester Young and Count Basie – Broadcast Performances Vol. 2 (1955)
- Red Garland Trio – All Kinds of Weather (1959), familiar to listeners of American Public Media's Marketplace radio program, which plays Garland's version as background accompaniment whenever news of a decline in the Dow Jones Industrial Average is reported
- Frank Sinatra – No One Cares (1959)
- Charles Mingus with Eric Dolphy – Mingus! (1960)
- Billy Eckstine – Once More with Feeling (1960)
- Etta James – At Last! (1961)
- Judy Garland – London Sessions and the Grammy Award-winning album Judy at Carnegie Hall
- Mary Lou Williams – Live at the Keystone Korner (1977)
- Viola Wills – covered the song in 1982, peaking at #4 on the Billboard dance charts.
- Woody Shaw with Steve Turre – Imagination (1987)
- Jeff Lynne – Covered the song for his first solo album Armchair Theatre (1990).
- Reigning Sound – Time Bomb High School (2002) – A raucous rock cover using many of the 1933 original's lyrics to a new arrangement.
- Bob Dylan – Recorded his version for his third album of traditional American covers, Triplicate (2017).
