= Bluff City (album) =

Studio album by Compulsive Gamblers
- Released: April 27, 1999
- Genre: Garage rock
- Length: 45:40
- Label: Sympathy for the Record Industry

Compulsive Gamblers chronology
Gambling Days are Over (1995)	Bluff City (1999)	Crystal Gazing Luck Amazing (2000)

Professional ratings
Review scores
Source	Rating
AllMusic	4.5/5 stars

Bluff City is the second studio album by the Compulsive Gamblers. It was released on April 27, 1999, by the independent music label, Sympathy for the Record Industry. The album was recorded after the band returned from a four-year hiatus in which members Greg Cartwright and Jack Yarber were recording under the name, the Oblivians. Bluff City was written while the Compulsive Gamblers were a threesome, with Cartwright and Yarber joined by Bushrod Thomas on drums. After the recording of Bluff City, the group recruited bassist Jeff Meier for a European tour in support of the album.

== Track listing ==
1. "My Love Is a Monster" (Cartwright, Sayles) - 3:25
2. "X-Ray Eyes" (Cartwright, Yarber) - 3:07
3. "Mystery Girl" (Cartwright) - 3:38
4. "Pepper Spray Boogie" (Yarber) - 2:36
5. "I Call You Mine" (Cartwright) - 4:16
6. "One-Eyed Girl" (Cartwright) - 4:43
7. "I Don't Want to Laugh at You" (Cartwright) - 4:40
8. "New Romance" (Cartwright) - 2:57
9. "You Don't Want Me" - 4:35
10. "Don't Come Looking for Me Now" (Cartwright) - 3:48
11. "Trouble" (Majors) - 3:47
12. "Don't Haunt Me" (Traditional) - 4:08

== Personnel ==
- Greg Cartwright - organ, guitar, bass, vocals
- Jack Yarber - organ, bass, saxophone, vocals, guitar
- Dale Beavers - guitar
- Scott Bomar - bass, piano
