= Gambling Days Are Over =

Studio album by Compulsive Gamblers
- Released: August 11, 1995
- Recorded: 1991 – February 1993
- Genre: Garage rock
- Length: 60:15
- Label: Sympathy for the Record Industry
- Producer: Doug Easley, Davis McCain

Compulsive Gamblers chronology
Gambling Days Are Over (1995)	Bluff City (1999)

Professional ratings
Review scores
Source	Rating
AllMusic	2/5 stars

Gambling Days Are Over is the debut studio album by the Compulsive Gamblers. It was released in 1995 by Sympathy for the Record Industry. The album, with the exception of the last three songs, was recorded on an 8-track recorder in vocalist Jack Oblivian's apartment. The album was released after the band had already broken up, and was essentially a collection of the group's three 7-inch releases, "Church Goin'," "Joker," and Goodtime Gamblers." During the recording of the album the Compulsive Gamblers lineup consisted of Jack Oblivian and Greg Oblivian on guitar and vocals, Bushrod Thomas on drums, Fields Trimble on bass, and Greg Easterly on violin. The first three songs on the album are cover songs reflecting the band's diverse influences; the album contains covers by The Tornados, the Bar-Kays, and Tom Waits. The song "Sour and Vicious Man" was covered by Jay Reatard of the Reatards on their third album, Not Fucked Enough.

== Track listing ==
1. "Telstar" (Meek) – 2:26
2. "Bad Taste" (Bar-Kays, Kays) – 3:32
3. "Way Down in the Hole" (Waits) – 3:01
4. "Dead Waltz (Cartwright) – 2:52
5. "Sour and Vicious Man" (Cartwright) – 2:24
6. "Two Wrongs Don't Make a Right" (Cartwright) – 3:04
7. "Walking the Balustrade" (Yarber) – 2:43
8. "Scaring Myself" (Yarber) – 3:03
9. "Capone's Finest" (Cartwright) – 2:29
10. "They'll Name a Drink After You" (Yarber) – 3:36
11. "Quit This Town" (Yarber) – 5:39
12. "They Call Me Names" (Yarber) – 3:24
13. "Phoney Lesbians" (Cartwright) – 2:21
14. "Gamblin' Days Are Over" (Cartwright) – 3:26
15. "I See You Everywhere" (Cartwright) – 4:09
16. "Handful of Burning Sand" (Cartwright) – 2:49
17. "Devil in My Back Pocket" (Cartwright) – 2:23
18. "Feel Good Music" (Yarber) – 4:10
19. "Good Time" (Cartwright) – 2:50
20. "My Mind Is in the Gutter" (Yarber) – 3:16

== Personnel ==
- The Compulsive Gamblers – Main Performer
- Greg Cartwright – Organ, Vocals, Guitar, Piano
- Jack Yarber – Organ, Vocals, Guitar, Guitar (Rhythm), Saxophone
- Lorette Velvette – Piano, Slide Guitar
- Jeff Harris – Bass
- Rodney Thomas – Drums
- Davis McCain – Engineer
- Doug Easley – Engineer
