= Duchess Says =

Canadian punk rock band

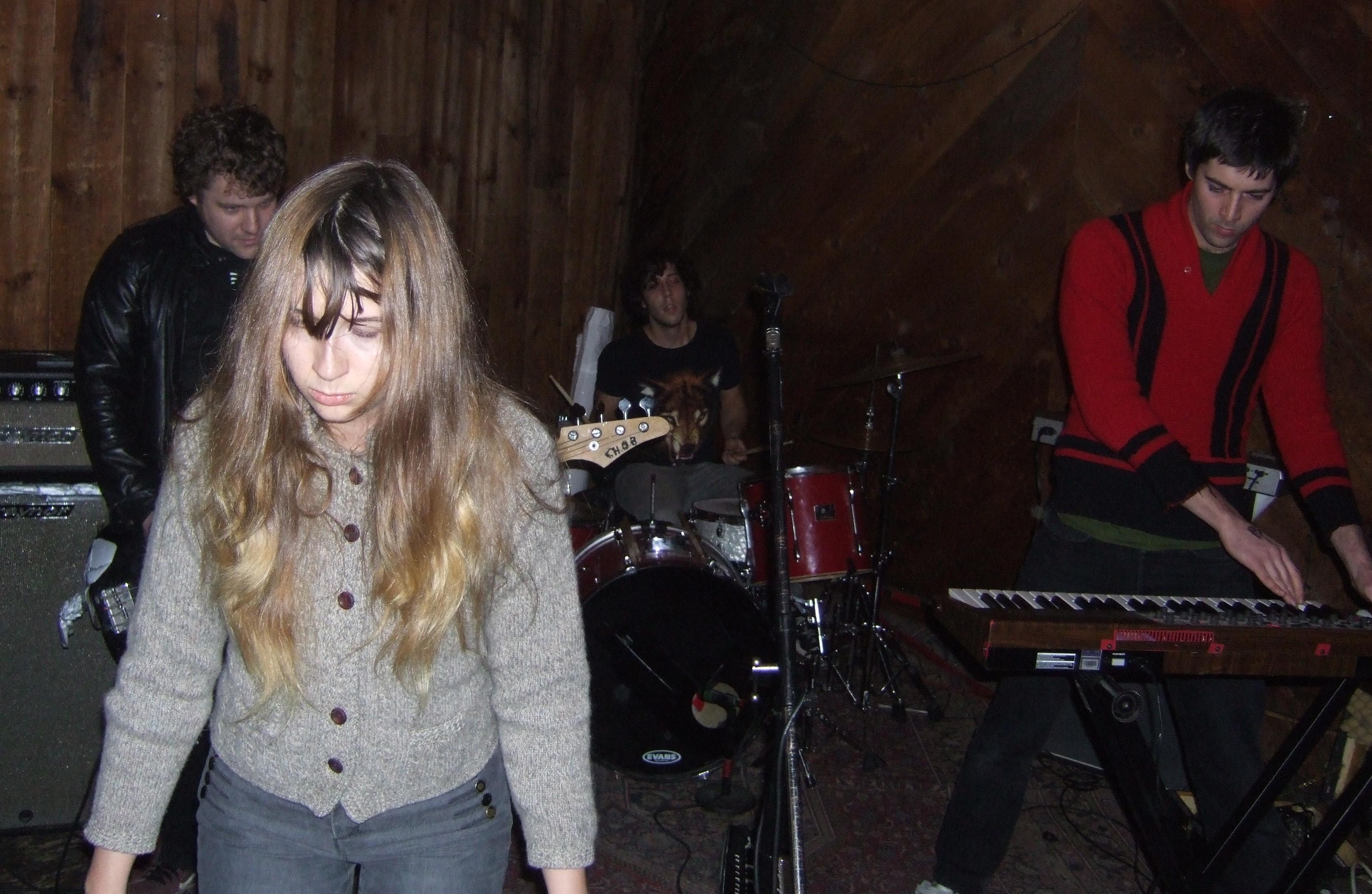
- Duchess Says performing in 2006

Background information
- Origin: Montreal, Quebec, Canada
- Genres: Punk rock; dance-punk; electropunk
- Years active: 2003–present
- Labels: Alien8 Recordings, Summer Lovers Unlimited Music
- Members: Simon Besre; Philippe Clément; Annie-Claude Deschênes; Ismael Tremblay

Duchess Says is a Canadian punk rock band from Montreal. The band describes its genre as "moog rock", and is known for its large, loud and theatrical live shows.

== History ==
Duchess Says was formed in late 2003. The band consists of vocalist and guitarist Annie-Claude Deschênes, keyboardist and guitarist Ismael Tremblay, guitarist and bassist Philippe Clément, and percussionist Simon "Simon Says" Besre.

After releasing a single and an EP in 2006, Duchess Says released their first album, Anthologie des 3 Perchoirs. in 2008. They have been playlisted on CBC Radio 3 and Bande à part, been featured in the soundtrack from the film The Tracey Fragments, the soundtrack from the film Shadow in the Cloud, and have performed at Eurockéennes and the Osheaga Festival. In 2009, they supported Yeah Yeah Yeahs on dates during their winter tour of venues in the UK.

In 2011, the band's album In a Fung Day T! was released. The album appeared on the !earshot Campus and Community National Top 50 Albums chart in January 2012, and that year the band toured in the United States. In 2015, the band performed at the Festival of Emerging Music in Rouyn-Noranda, Quebec.

In 2016, Duchess Says released the album Science Nouvelles, and toured in support of the album.

Deschênes released Les Manières de table, her debut solo album, in 2024. It was a longlisted nominee for the 2024 Polaris Music Prize.

== Discography ==
=== Albums ===
- Anthologie des 3 Perchoirs (August 26, 2008, Alien8 Recordings)
- In a Fung Day T! (October 11, 2011, Alien8 Recordings)
- Sciences Nouvelles (October 14, 2016, Slovenly Recordings)

=== EPs ===
- Noviçiat Mère-Perruche (2005, Summer Lovers Unlimited Music)
- Black Flag (2006, Summer Lovers Unlimited Music)
- Begging the 3 Ts (2009, Alien8 Recordings)
- Duchess Says / Le Prince Harry (Split with Le Prince Harry) (2015, Teenage Menopause Records)

=== Singles ===
- "Fire Baptized Species" (7" split with Red Mass) (2009, Alien8 Recordings)
- "Black Flag (Maxi-Single)" (2009, Back Yard Recordings)
- "Negative Thoughts" (7", 2016, GoodToGo Records)

=== Soundtrack ===
- The Tracey Fragments (Various Artists) (May 13, 2008, Lakeshore Records)
- Shadow in the Cloud (2020) (Various Artists)

=== Compilations ===
- Montreal Noise and Friends (Various Artists) (2006)
- Digital Penetration Volume 2 (Various Artists) (2008)

== See also ==
- Music of Canada
- Music of Quebec
- Canadian rock
- List of Canadian musicians
- List of bands from Canada
