= The Spits =

American punk rock band

- Origin: Kalamazoo, Michigan, United States
- Genres: Punk rock, garage punk, synthpunk
- Years active: 2000–present
- Labels: Nickel and Dime Records, Slovenly Recordings, Dirtnap Records, Thriftstore Records, In the Red Records
- Members: Sean Wood; Erin Wood; Wayne Draves; Erik Nervous; Broose Young
- Past members: Greg T Darren Benson; Ernie Quintero; Joe Pestilence; Nick Markel; Johnny LZR

The Spits are an American punk rock band formed in Kalamazoo, Michigan in 1993. They later moved to Seattle. Currently, the band has released six albums. All are officially self-titled, unofficially titled 1, 2, 3, 4, V, and VI respectively. The albums were released by Nickel and Dime Records, Slovenly Recordings, Dirtnap Records, Thriftstore Records and In the Red Records respectively for the first five. In October 2020, they released their latest album, VI, independently.

The band describes itself as "Punk for the People", and focuses on loud, noisy, and dirty punk rock. On stage, band members frequently appear in costumes (e.g. graduation robes, nun outfits, Ronald Reagan masks, or toilet paper "mummy" costumes), and focus on the dirty, low-budget sound and presentation of garage punk.

The Spits' "Bring Down" was featured in Al Partanen's skateboarding segment of the "Born Dead" skate video, as well as Darrel Mathe's section in the snowboarding video "love/HATE". "I H8 Pussies" was featured in Andy Forgash's segment in the snowboarding video, "Burning Bridges" as well. Their song, "Remote Control" appears in the Absinthe Films snowboarding video, "More". "Rip Up The Streets" was featured in Vans skate team commercial 2012 year. "All I Want" appeared in Zero Skateboards' "Less Than Zero" video in 2024, and the company released an official Spits deck and clothing collection that same year.

== Personnel ==
- Sean Wood — guitar, vocals
- Erin Wood — bass,vocals
- Wayne Draves - drums
- Broose Young – background vocals
- Poya Esghai – keyboards
- Erik Nervous - keyboards
- Lance Phelps - drums (former)
- Greg T — keyboards (former)
- Darren Benson - keyboards (former)
- Ernie Quintero - keyboards (former)
- Joe Pestilence - keyboards (former)
- Nick Markel - keyboards (former)
- Johnny LZR - keyboards (former)

== Discography ==
=== Singles ===
19 Million A.C. 7" (Dirtnap Records, 2001, ZZZ 10)

- A1. 19 Million A.C.
- A2. Tease
- B1. Shitty World
- B1. Dumb

Later released on CD w/Bonus Songs "19 Million A.C. EP CD"
CD Later released w/Bonus Songs on LP "19 Million A.C. EP CD LP"

Spend the Night in a Haunted House with...The Spits 7" (Missile X Records, 2004, MX 003)

- A1. Halloween Fun
- A2. Black Candles
- B1. Spend the Night in a Haunted House with The Spits

Clear green vinyl, 500 copies, released with a candy sucker for the little Trick-r-Treaters

Pain 7" (Slovenly Recordings, 2009, 702-89)

- A1. Pain (Mollin / Silvestri)
- A2. Beat You Up
- B1. Army Life
- B2. Planet Failure

=== Splits ===
Split 7" (Dirtnap Records, 2000, ZZZ 05)

- A1. The Spits: Pissed Off Baby
- A2. The Spits: Fire!
- B1. The Briefs: (I Think) My Baby Is A Communist
- B2. The Briefs: Silver Bullet

black-white-red sleeve, purple-marbled vinyl, 1000 pressed black-white-blue sleeve

Split 7" (Puke Records, 2005, No. 009)

- A1. The Spits: Spazmotic Caress
- A2. The Spits: Terrorist Attack
- B1. The Triggers: No Bullshit
- B2. The Triggers: Kill Your Ego

red or black vinyl

Split 7" (Scion Audio/Visual, 2010, #SAVG0109)

- A1. The Spits: Come With Me (Yeah, Wontcha)
- B1. Dan Melchior: Horrorshow

NOFX/The Spits Split 7" (Fat Wreckchords, 2010, FAT-245)

- A1. Nofx: Hold it Back
- A2. Nofx: Teenage Existentialist
- B1. The Spits: Wait
- B2. The Spits: Get Our Kicks

=== Albums ===
Spits - "Demo" Self Released

1. Tired and Lonely
2. Black Kar
3. SK8
4. Saturday Nite

The Spits CD (Nickel & Dime Records, 2000, N&D 001)

1. Dropout
2. SK8
3. Die Die Die
4. Black Kar
5. Saturday Nite
6. Remote Kontrol
7. Tired & Lonely
8. I H8 Pussies
9. Suzy's Face

The Spits 12"EP/CD (Slovenly Recordings, 2003, 702-36)

1. Spit Me Out
2. Black & Blue
3. PCT
4. Let Us Play Your Party
5. Rat Face
6. No Place to Live
7. Bring
8. Take Back the Alley
9. She Don't Kare

The Spits LP/CD (Dirtnap Records, 2003, ZZZ 42)

1. Witch Hunt
2. Space Guitar
3. Cha Cha Love
4. Tuff News
5. Violence Cup
6. Nuclear Bomb
7. 1989
8. Don't Shoot
9. Greyhound Bound
10. Fussin' & Fightin' (vinyl only track)

first 100 on red vinyl

2006 European Tour LP (P.Trash Records, 2006, LIVE TRASH 001)

1. Die Die Die
2. Dropout
3. Saturday Nite
4. Take Pleasure in Someone Else's Pain
5. What the Fuck
6. No Monarchy
7. Nuclear Bomb
8. Cha Cha Love
9. Bring
10. Spit Me Out
11. Witch Hunt
12. Remote Control

Returning to Their Hometown LP (Thriftstore Records, 2006, ZZZ 42)

1. Caza De La Bruja
2. Guitarra Del Espacio
3. Amor De Cha Cha
4. Noticias De Tuff
5. Taza De La Violencia
6. Bomba Nuclear
7. Mil Novecientos Ochenta Y Nueve
8. No Tire
9. Limite Del Galgo
10. Fusin' Y Un Fightin'

The Spits Live Volume 1 (Self Released Vinyl; 8-track tape released by Regal Select)

1. Die Die Die
2. Dropout
3. Saturday Nite
4. Take Pleasure in Someone Else's Pain
5. What The Fuck
6. No Monarchy
7. Nuclear Bomb
8. Cha Cha Love
9. Bring
10. Spit Me Out
11. Witch Hunt
12. Remote Control

previously released as The Spits 2006 Tour LP

19 Million A.C. EP CD LP

1. 19 Million A.C.
2. Shitty World
3. Dumb
4. Tease
5. Cha Cha Love
6. Remote Control
7. Black Car
8. Drop Out
9. Drink, Fight & Fuck (GG Allin)
10. Violence Cup
11. Kill from the Heart (Dicks)
12. Wendy O
13. Violence Cup
14. Pissed Off Baby
15. Beat My Head
16. Let Us Play Your Party
17. Fire
18. Space Guitar
19. Talking 'Bout You
20. Die

The Spits IV (School's Out) LP/CD (Thriftstore Records, 2009, 010)

1. Tonight
2. Rip up the Streets
3. Live in a Van
4. Eyesore City
5. Police
6. School's Out
7. Life of Crime
8. Alienize
9. Wouldn't Wanna be Ya
10. Flags
11. Beat You Up
12. Chemtrails
13. Liars
14. Army Bound (Later released as "Army Life" on the "Pain" 7")
15. Piss on Your Skull
16. I Dig Pain (Later released as "Pain" on the "Pain" 7")
17. Beat You Up w/Ethan LFD

Tracks 11-17 are cassette only

The Spits V (2012)

1. All I Want
2. My Mess
3. Tomorrow's Children
4. Electric Brain
5. Fed Up
6. Fallout Beach
7. My Life Sucks
8. I'm Scum
9. Brick By Brick
10. Acid Rain
11. I Wanna Be A.D.D.
12. Last Man On Earth

The Spits VI (2020)

1. Up All Night
2. Out of Time
3. Cop Kar
4. Breakdown
5. Creep
6. Broken Glass
7. Lose My Mind
8. It's Over
9. They
10. Wurms

=== Compilations appeared on ===
- I Was A Teenage Plasmatic, 7 Songs For Wendy O Williams 7" (Jonny Cat Records, 2001, FY*WOW)
- Dirtnap Across The Northwest CD (Dirtnap Records, 2003, ZZZ 25)
- Slovenly Sampler CD (Slovenly Recordings, 2004, 702-47)
- Funhouse Comp Thing II (My Fat Ass, 2008)
