= Live & Deadly: Memphis–Chicago =

Live & Deadly: Memphis-Chicago

Live album by Compulsive Gamblers
- Released: April 15, 2003
- Recorded: May 2002
- Genre: Garage rock
- Length: 59:58
- Label: Sympathy for the Record Industry
- Producer: The Compulsive Gamblers

Compulsive Gamblers chronology
Crystal Gazing Luck Amazing (2000)	Live & Deadly: Memphis-Chicago (2003)

Professional ratings
Review scores
Source	Rating
AllMusic	4/5 stars

Live & Deadly: Memphis–Chicago is a live album recorded by the Compulsive Gamblers. It is the final release by the band, released on April 15, 2003 by the independent record label Sympathy for the Record Industry. The album contains 16 tracks recorded during two May 2002 performances, one in Memphis, Tennessee, and the other in Chicago, Illinois. Live & Deadly was released just prior to the second and final time the Compulsive Gamblers disbanded. The album contains cover songs by the Bar-Kays, Tom Waits, and Nolan Strong & The Diablos. The song "Sour and Vicious Man" was in turn covered by The Reatards on their third album, Not Fucked Enough.

== Track listing ==
1. "Bad Taste" (Bar-Kays, Gamblers) – 3:31
2. "Your Happiness" (Brown) – 2:23
3. "Way Down in the Hole" (Waits) – 3:05
4. "I'm That Guy" (Cartwright) – 3:06
5. "Don't Come Looking for Me Now" (Cartwright) – 4:06
6. "New Romance" (Cartwright) – 3:05
7. "Mind in the Gutter" (Yarber) – 5:14
8. "Sour and Vicious Man" (Cartwright) – 3:10
9. "Stop and Think It Over" (Cartwright) – 3:23
10. "Two Wrongs Don't Make a Right" (Cartwright) – 3:16
11. "Wait a Bit Joe" (Yarber) – 2:48
12. "I Don't Want to Laugh at You" (Cartwright) – 3:22
13. "Name a Drink After You" (Yarber) – 3:48
14. "Two Thieves" (Cartwright) – 5:50
15. "Pepper Spray Boogie" (Yarber) – 2:22
16. "Quit This Town" (Cartwright, Yarber) – 7:29

== Personnel ==
- Greg Cartwright – guitar, vocals
- Jack Yarber – guitar, vocals
- Alex Greene – organ, piano
- Jeremy Scott – bass, background vocals
- Greg Roberson – drums
- The Compulsive Gamblers – producer
