= Reigning Sound =

American rock and roll band

The Reigning Sound
- Origin: Memphis, Tennessee, U.S.
- Genres: Rock, garage punk, garage rock
- Years active: 2001—2022
- Labels: Merge, In the Red, Norton, Sympathy for the Record Industry
- Past members: Greg Cartwright; Alex Greene; Greg Roberson; Graham Winchester; John Whittemore; Seth Moody; Benny Trokan; Carol Schumacher; Dave Amels; Dave Gay; Lance Wille; Mike Catanese; Mikey Post

Reigning Sound was an American rock and roll band originally based in Memphis, Tennessee, United States. As of 2019, along with fronting Reigning Sound, Greg Cartwright also reformed his past band Greg Oblivian and the Tip Tops. In 2020, he also reformed with the original "Memphis lineup" of Reigning Sound once again playing shows with the outfit's first incarnation. In a June 8, 2022, message on the group's Facebook page, Cartwright formally announced the end of Reigning Sound.

== History ==
Reigning Sound was formed in 2001 by Memphis garage punk musician Greg Cartwright (vocals/guitar), who is also known for his bands the Compulsive Gamblers and the Oblivians. Originally, the Memphis-based band featured Cartwright, Jeremy Scott (bass), Greg Roberson (drums) and Alex Greene (keyboards and guitar). However, after Cartwright and his family re-located to Asheville, North Carolina in 2004, bassist David Wayne Gay, drummer Lance Wille, and keyboardist Dave Amels joined Cartwright until October 2011 with Amels continuing until 2019.

Reigning Sound's debut was Two Sides to Every Man, a three-song 7", released in May 2001; one month later came their first full-length album Break Up, Break Down (Sympathy for the Record Industry). With its country-folk melodies, the first album was to be an early blueprint of where Cartwright's songwriting was headed.

Time Bomb High School (In the Red) was released in August 2002, and is known for its polished sound, pop hooks and delicate balance of classic R&B and rock & roll. Aside from the originals on the album, Cartwright blended in cover songs like "Stormy Weather" and "Brown Paper Sack", producing them in the same recognizable sound the band had developed.

Reigning Sound's third album Too Much Guitar (In the Red) was released in May 2004 with recording help from fellow Memphians Jay Reatard and Alicja Trout from the Lost Sounds; with a noticeably louder and noisier sound than previous recordings. Songs laced with psych-pop, garage, soul, country and (of course) too-much guitar compete with Cartwright's vocals at times in the loud fuzzy mix. An opening slot on a huge American tour with the Swedish garage band The Hives helped to promote the album shortly after its release. A misprint in the album credits gives the impression that founding member Alex Greene appeared on only one song. In fact, he played on half the album: "You Got Me Hummin'", "When You Touch Me," "Get It," "Drowning," "Uptight Tonight," "Let Yourself Go," and "Medication."

Reigning Sound: Live at Maxwell's (Telstar/Spoonful) was released in July 2005. The notorious end of the gig features Cartwright (with no back-up set) breaking all but three guitar strings but still finishing the show for the rowdy crowd. This rough-sounding live album is the only record featuring the Sam Cooke cover track "I Need You Now," as a homage by Cartwright to one of his favorite singers.

In September 2005, The Reigning Sound released a rarities comp. Home for Orphans (Sympathy for the Record Industry). The album features slower, moodier alternate versions of tunes from "Too Much Guitar" along with some other unreleased tracks.

Late in January 2006, Memphis based Goner Records released The Reigning Sound: Live at Goner Records, a daytime in-store performance recorded in June 2005. The album also hosts cover songs like "Black Sheep" by Sam the Sham and the Pharaohs, "Tennessee" by Carl Perkins and "Do Something" by The Swingin' Yo-Yo's.

After spending a portion of 2005 recording an album for George Soule with Dan Penn and Spooner Oldham, the band once again began recording with Mary Weiss (of the 60s band The Shangri-Las, widely known for their hit "Leader of the Pack"). Reigning Sound was the backing band on the first new Mary Weiss album in over three decades. Cartwright also co-produced the album with Billy Miller and wrote nine of the 14 songs featured on the record. Norton Records released Dangerous Game in March 2007, receiving favorable reviews from the likes of Rolling Stone as well as performing with Weiss on NBC's Late Night with Conan O'Brien.

Reigning Sound released a new full-length album Love & Curses on In the Red Records in August 2009, featuring 14 songs and one cover, "Stick Over Me", originally recorded by a '60s band called The Glass Sun (interpreted on the album as "Stick Up for Me"). In September 2010, Reigning Sound's cover of "Mind Over Matter", a '50s R&B cover, was featured on the compilation Daddy Rockin Strong: A Tribute to Nolan Strong & The Diablos, an album of current garage-punk bands covering the late Nolan Strong.

In October 2011, Reigning Sound released a digital "mini-LP" called Abdication ... For Your Love on the Scion Audio Visual label. The eight-song collection was released as a free digital download; however, some limited edition vinyl and promo CDs were also pressed. Five tracks from this EP were recorded and produced by Dan Auerbach of The Black Keys. While some of the songs featured Cartwright alongside drummer Lance Wille and bassist David Wayne Gay, this would be the last recordings the two would appear on – Wille and Gay would leave the band just before the release of Abdication.

The band signed to Merge Records in September 2012 and released Shattered (2014) and A Little More Time with Reigning Sound (2021). In a June 8, 2022, message on the group's Facebook page, Cartwright formally announced the end of Reigning Sound. He wrote, "It was my intention with A Little More Time to come full circle, reunite the original lineup of the band, and finish where we started. I thought we could support the album with some touring and go out on a high note, but Covid has proven to be a long-lasting concern and more difficult to navigate than anyone could have anticipated. Rather than compromise ourselves or our fans, I have decided this is the right time to dissolve the band."

== Discography ==
=== Albums ===
- Break Up, Break Down (2001)
- Time Bomb High School (2002)
- Too Much Guitar (2004)
- Home for Orphans (2005)
- Dangerous Game – Mary Weiss (feat. Reigning Sound) (2007)
- Love & Curses (2009)
- Shattered (2014)
- A Little More Time with Reigning Sound (2021)

=== Live albums ===
- Live at Maxwell's (Spoonful Records, 2005, LP-SR-005)
- Live at Goner Records (21Gone) (2005)
- Memphis In June (2022)

=== EPs ===
- Abdication ... For Your Love (Scion, 2011)

=== 7" vinyl splits ===
- The Hentchmen / Reigning Sound: "Rolling Stones Series" 45 rpm (Norton Records, 2003, 9642)
- Reigning Sound / Last Year's Men: "Scion A/V" 45 rpm (Scion A/V/Vice Records, 2011)

=== Singles ===
- "Here Without You" 7" (Sympathy for the Record Industry, 2001, SFTRI 656)
- "If Christmas Won't Bring You Home" 7" (Norton Records, 2004, 45–121)
- "I'll Cry" 7" (Slovenly Recordings, 2005, 702–50)
- "Don't Come Back" 7" (Norton Records 2007) – Mary Weiss (feat. Reigning Sound)

=== Compilation albums ===
- Root Damage 2xLP/2xCD (Sympathy for the Record Industry, 2003, SFTRI 713)

track: "As Long as You Come Home"

- Revolver Sampler Winter 2003 CD (Revolver, 2003, cat. no. ?)

track: "Straight Shooter"

- Broad Daylight Soundtrack CD (Guerrilla Monster Films, 2003, No. 12300)

track: "Medication"

- Superfuzz CD (Lowfly Records, 2005, LF 061)

track: "I'll Cry"

- Static Disaster The U.K.: In The Red Records Sampler CD (In the Red, 2005, ITR 1313)

track: "Drowning"

- Daddy Rockin Strong: A Tribute to Nolan Strong & The Diablos (The Wind / Norton Records, 2010, TWR002 LP)

track: "Mind Over Matter"
