= Time Bomb High School =

Studio album by Reigning Sound
- Released: June 11, 2002
- Recorded: January, 2002 at Easley McCain Recording
- Genre: Garage punk
- Length: 37:41
- Label: In the Red
- Producer: Doug Easley

Reigning Sound chronology
Break Up, Break Down (2001)	Time Bomb High School (2002)	Too Much Guitar (2004)

Professional ratings
Review scores
Source	Rating
AllMusic	4.5/5 stars

Time Bomb High School is the second album by the Reigning Sound. It was released in 2002 on In the Red Records. The album featured the original Reigning Sound lineup of Greg Cartwright on lead vocals and guitar; Alex Greene on organ, piano, guitar, and backing vocals; Jeremy Scott on bass, and backing vocals; and Greg Roberson on drums. Howlin' Pelle Almqvist of The Hives commented in Rolling Stone that Time Bomb High School was his favorite record of 2002.

== Track listing ==
Time Bomb High School LP/CD (In The Red, 2002, ITR 084)

1. Stormy Weather (Arlen, Koehler) - 2:11
2. Straight Shooter (Cartwright) - 1:33
3. You're Not as Pretty (Cartwright) - 2:55
4. Brown Paper Sack (Rogers) - 2:13
5. Wait and See (Cartwright) - 2:33
6. I Walk by Your House (Cartwright) - 2:49
7. Time Bomb High School (Cartwright) - 1:35
8. I Don't Believe (Davis, Hutcherson, Paul) - 2:44
9. She's Bored with You (Cartwright) - 2:11
10. Reptile Style (Cartwright) - 3:22
11. I'm Holding Out (Cartwright) - 2:43
12. I Don't Know How to Tell You (Cartwright) - 2:29
13. Dressy (Cartwright) - 2:54
14. I'd Much Rather Be with the Boys (Oldham, Richard) - 2:17
15. You're So Strange (Cartwright) - 3:11

The vinyl LP has the songs listed in a different order, and excludes "I Walk By Your House".

== Personnel ==
- Greg Cartwright - Guitar, Producer, Vocals
- Alex Greene - Organ, Guitar, Vocals (Background)
- Jeremy Scott - Bass, Vocals (Background), Vocals
- Greg Roberson - Drums
- Doug Easley - Engineer
