= Jack Yarber =

American singer, songwriter, and guitarist

- Also known as: Jack Oblivian, Jack O
- Born: Jack Yarber; March 15, 1967 (age 59)
- Origin: Corinth, Mississippi, U.S.
- Genres: Garage punk, punk blues, rock and roll, rhythm and blues
- Occupations: singer songwriter
- Instruments: vocals guitar drums
- Years active: 1980s – Present
- Labels: Crypt Records; Goner Records; Sympathy for the Record Industry
- Member of: Jack O & the Tennessee Tearjerkers
- Formerly of: The Compulsive Gamblers, The Oblivians, The End, Johnny Vomit & The Dry Heaves, Andre Williams, The Knaughty Knights, South Filthy, The Cool Jerks, The Limes, '68 Comeback, King Louie & His Loose Diamonds, Greg Oblivian & the Tip Tops, Jack Oblivian & The Cigarillos, The Natural Kicks, Tav Falco's Panther Burns

Jack Yarber (born March 15, 1967), also known by his stage name Jack Oblivian, is an American singer, songwriter, and guitarist based in Memphis, Tennessee. He was a founding member of the garage bands The Compulsive Gamblers, and The Oblivians and currently fronts Jack O & the Tennessee Tearjerkers.

Yarber has also been a member, or contributed to: The End, Johnny Vomit & The Dry Heaves, Andre Williams, The Knaughty Knights, South Filthy, The Cool Jerks, The Limes, '68 Comeback, King Louie & His Loose Diamonds, Greg Oblivian & the Tip Tops, Jack Oblivian & The Cigarillos, The Natural Kicks and Tav Falco's Panther Burns.

Today, Yarber continues to write, record and tour as a solo artist. In January 2016, he released his seventh solo album, The Lone Ranger of Love. The record was released on his own label, Mony Records.

== Johnny Vomit and the Dry Heaves ==
Jack Yarber began his professional music career in high school, appearing alongside high-school friend and future Squirrel Nut Zippers founder Jimbo Mathus in the Corinth, Mississippi, based Johnny Vomit & the Dry Heaves. Yarber played drums in the outfit, which credited him as Johnny Goopa. Johnny Vomit & the Dry Heaves would go on to be one of Yarber's longest-running side projects, the song "Knick the Knife" on his latest Tennessee Tearjearkers album being a reworked version of a song performed in early Johnny Vomit jam sessions.

== The End ==
In the summer of 1987 (?), Yarber moved to Memphis, Tennessee, to play music with his cousin. Yarber and his cousin played together using a number of band names, eventually releasing a new wave 7-inch under the name The End. The tracks "You Never Called" and "People Talk" (later covered by Cheap Time) were recorded in 1984 at Phillips Studio in Memphis, Tennessee. That vinyl single, released on the Erwin record label marked Yarber's first appearance on record. By 1989 the two had diverged musically and Yarber's cousin left town, effectively ending their partnership.

== The Compulsive Gamblers ==
Following the breakup of The End, Yarber's encounter with fellow musician Greg Cartwright led to the formation of the Compulsive Gamblers. Despite recording two 7-inch albums and a handful of home recordings, the band was unable to garner record label interest until after the success of their next band, the Oblivians. The Compulsive Gamblers would reform in the late 1990s and early 2000s, releasing two studio albums and one live LP on Sympathy For the Record Industry.

== The Oblivians ==
The Oblivians formed in 1993 as a side project to the Compulsive Gamblers, and included former Gambler Greg Cartwright, as well as future Goner Records founder, Eric Friedl. The members of the Oblivians all shared writing and recording responsibilities. Each member supplied vocals, guitar work, and percussion on albums, and switched between instruments during live shows. The Oblivians lasted from 1993 until 1998, at which time Yarber and Cartwright left the band to reform the Compulsive Gamblers. The second incarnation of the Gamblers lasted from 1998 to 2003, when the bandmembers again went their separate ways.

== The Tennessee Tearjerkers ==
After pursuing a brief solo career, Yarber teamed up with Scott Bomar to form the Tearjearkers. As Bomar became more and more involved with film scoring, Yarber began to take a more active role in the band, ultimately taking over as lead songwriter after Bomar's departure. With Yarber in control of the group, the band was rechristened the Tennessee Tearjerkers. At the same time as Yarber was writing songs with the Tearjerkers, he was also contributing in various ways to a number of side projects including, the Knaughty Knights, the Limes, and South Filthy which included collaborations with longtime associates Walter Daniels, and Monsieur Jeffrey Evans. In 2007 Yarber released another solo LP, "The Flip Side Kid." The CD version was released by Sympathy For the Record Industry and Yarber self-released the vinyl under his own label, "Dirt Cheap Date."

== The Oblivians reunion ==
In 2008, The Oblivians and The Gories announced a dual reunion tour, which happened in the summer of 2009, mostly in Europe, but also a couple shows in Memphis and Detroit. Since then, the Oblivians have continued playing sporadic gigs and released a 2015 album via in the Red Records, Desperation.

== Discography ==
=== As Jack Oblivian ===
Solo albums

- American Slang 12-inch EP/CD (Sympathy for the Record Industry, 1997, SFTRI 475)
- So Low LP/CD (Sympathy for the Record Industry, 1998, SFTRI 535)
- Bad Mood Rising LP/CD (Sympathy for the Record Industry, 2001, SFTRI 643)
- Don't Throw Your Love Away LP/CD (Sympathy for the Record Industry, 2005, SFTRI 735)
- Jack-O Is The Flip Side Kid LP/CD (Dirt Cheap Records/Sympathy for the Record Industry, 2006, BR-003/SFTRI 778)
- The Disco Outlaw LP/CD (Goner Records, 2009, 45 Gone)
- Rat City LP/CD (Big Legal Mess, 2011)
- Jack O & the Sheiks: Live! LP (Secret Identity/Red Lounge, 2014)
- The Lone Ranger of Love LP (Mony, 2016)

'Solo singles'

- Jack Oblivian & The Cigarillos: "Mad Dog 20/20" (CD Compilation Freakland-iPunkrock, 2003)
- "Chills & Fever" 7-inch (Brown Sound, 2005, BS 001)
- "Original Mixed Up Kid" 7-inch (Bancroft Records, 2006, BR-005)
- "Black Boots" 7-inch (Shattered Records, 2006, SR-013)
- Jack Oblivian & The Cigarillos: "Women's Milk" 7-inch (Ghost Highway Recordings, 2007)
- "Sweet Thang" 7-inch (The Wind Records, 2008, TWR001)
- Jack Oblivian & The Cigarillos: "15 Beers" / "Drinking Women's Milk" 7-inch (Ghost Highway Recordings, 2007)

'Solo cassettes'

- "Is She Crazy" cassette (Mony, 2015)

Solo appears on

- Various Artists – Sunday Nights: The Songs of Junior Kimbrough (2005, Fat Possum Records) – "I'm in Love With You" (Junior Kimbrough)

== Other releases ==
=== With The End ===
Singles

- "You Never Called"/"People Talk" 7-inch (Erwin Records, 1985, E-2410/E-2411)

=== With Johnny Vomit and The Dry Heaves ===
Singles

- "Johnny Vomit & The Dry Heaves" 7-inch (Goner Records, 1993, 6Gone)
- "Thanks for the Ride!" 7-inch (Goner Records, 2005, 18gone)
- "Running in a Rat Race" 7-inch (Solid Sex Lovie Doll Records, 2006, SSLD 008)

=== With the Compulsive Gamblers ===
Singles

- "Joker" 7-inch (Boiler Room, 1992, cat.no.?)
- "Church Goin'" 7-inch (Lemon Peel Records, 1992, LP001 – LP002)
- "Goodtime Gamblers" 7-inch (Boiler Room, 1995, BR 002)

Albums

- Gambling Days are Over CD (Sympathy for the Record Industry, 1995, SFTRI 372)
- Bluff City LP/CD (Sympathy for the Record Industry, 1999, SFTRI 570)
- Crystal Gazing Luck Amazing LP/CD (Sympathy for the Record Industry, 2000, SFTRI 572)
- Live & Deadly: Memphis-Chicago 2xLP/CD (Sympathy for the Record Industry, 2003, SFTRI 698)

=== With the Oblivians ===
Singles

- "Call The Shots" 7-inch (Goner Records, 1993, 2Gone)
- "Sunday You Need Love" 7-inch (Crypt, 1994, CR-044)
- "Now for the Hard Of Hearing From … 'Blow Their Cool'" 7-inch (Estrus, 1994, ES 756)
- "Static Party" 7-inch (In The Red, 1994, ITR 018)
- "Go!Pill-Popper!" 7-inch (Drug Racer, 1996, 001)
- "Strong Come On" 7-inch (Crypt, 1996, CR-053)
- "Kick Your Ass" 7-inch (Sympathy for the Record Industry, 1996, SFTRI 412)

Splits

- Split CS with Impala (Goner Records/Power Of Bob, 1993, 0Gone/POB 103)
- Split 7-inch with Two Bo's Maniacs (Hate Records, 1997, hate 7)
- Split 7-inch with the Crime Kaisers (Active Detective, 1998, active detective record #1)

Albums

- Oblivians 10-inch (Sympathy for the Record Industry, 1994, SFTRI 304)
- Soul Food LP/CD (Crypt, 1995, CR-055)
- Live in Atlanta 8.19.94 LP (Negro Records, 1995, negro records 001)
- Six of the Best 10" (Sympathy for the Record Industry, 1996, SFTRI 383)
- The Sympathy Sessions CD (Sympathy for the Record Industry, 1996, SFTRI 406)
- Walter Daniels Plays With Monsieur Jeffrey Evans & The Oblivians at Melissa's Garage 10-inch (Undone, 1995, UDR-0008-10)
- Popular Favorites LP/CD (Crypt, 1996, CR-065)
- ...Play 9 Songs with Mr Quintron LP/CD (Crypt, 1997, CR-082)
- 17 Cum Shots LP (Bootleg, 1997, cat.no.?)
- Best of the Worst: 93-97 2xLP/CD (Sympathy for the Record Industry, 1999, SFTRI 584)
- On The Go LP (Goner Records, 2003, 12Gone)
- Barristers 95 [Live] (In the Red, 2009, ITR 182)
- Desperation (In the Red, 2015)

=== with Tav Falco's Panther Burns ===
Albums

- FZ 6900 Panther Phobia LP/CD (In The Red, 2000, ITR 069)

=== with the Knaughty Knights ===
Singles

- "Connection" 7-inch (Solid Sex Lovie Doll Records, 2002, SSLD 007)
- "I Love It To Death" 7-inch (Perpetrator Records, 2004, PERP 3)
- "Death Has Come Over Me" 7-inch (Goner Records, 2005, 20Gone)
- "Tommy of the River" 7-inch (Shattered Records, 2006, SR-011)

Splits

- "Split" 7-inch with the Wildebeests (Norton Records, 2003, 9641)

=== with South Filthy ===
Singles

- "Soul of a Man" 7-inch (Wrecked Em Records, 2003, wrecked 004)
- "Goin' Down The Valley" / "Carry That Load" 7-inch (Beast Records, 2007, BR076)

Albums

- You Can Name It Yo' Mammy If You Wanna... CD (Sympathy for the Record Industry, 2002, SFTRI 701)
- Crackin' Up + You Can Name It Yo' Mammy If You Wanna 2xLP/LP (Rockin' Bones, 2005, RON 062-1/RON062-2)
- Crackin' Up CD (Licorice Tree Records, 2006, YUM 1008)
- Undertakin' Daddy LP (Beast Records, 2009, LP-BR87)

=== with the Cool Jerks ===
Singles

- "Whole Wide World" 7-inch (Misprint Records, 2003, msp 0110)

Albums

- Cleaned A Lot Of Plates in Memphis LP/CD (Sympathy for the Record Industry, 2002, SFTRI 689)

=== with the Limes ===
Singles

- "Goddamn You Honey" 7-inch (Solid Sex Lovie Doll Records, 2004, SSLD 014)
- "Rock'n'roll Heart" 7-inch (Nasty Product, 2006, NP 10)

Albums

- Tarantula! CD (Death Valley Records, 2005, DV-010)

=== with the Natural Kicks ===
Albums

- Natural Kicks CD (Miz Kafrin, 2005, Miz Kafrin 007)
