= Michael Yonkers =

American rock guitarist (1947–2026)

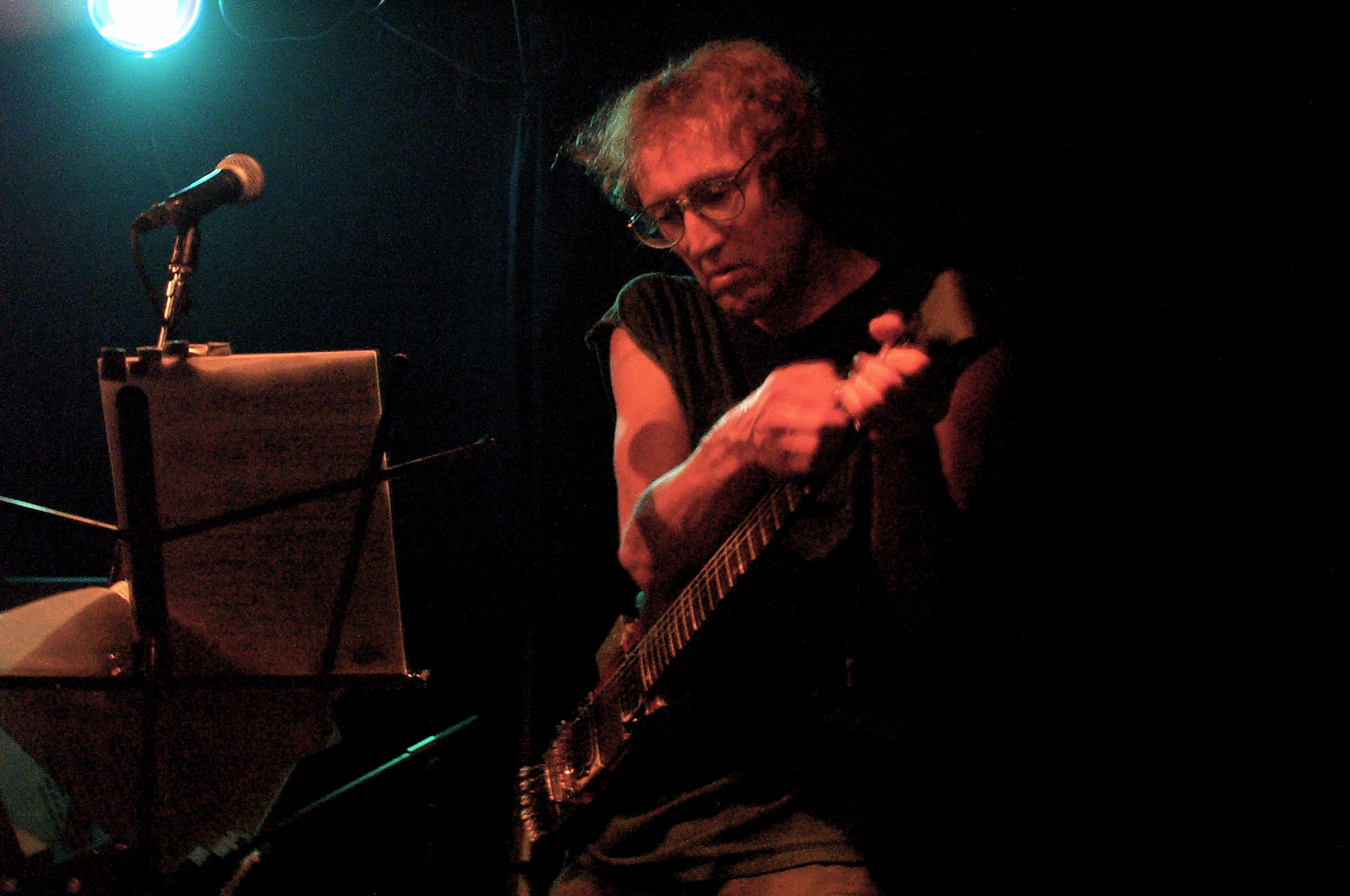
- Yonkers in 2003

Background information
- Born: Michael Regis Yunker; October 3, 1947; Minneapolis, Minnesota, U.S.
- Died: April 20, 2026 (aged 78) Saint Paul, Minnesota, U.S.
- Genres: Psychedelic rock; folk music
- Years active: 1963–2010s
- Labels: Sub Pop, Light in the Attic

Michael Yonkers (born Michael Regis Yunker; October 3, 1947 – April 20, 2026) was an American rock musician from Minneapolis-St. Paul. He released several albums throughout the 1970s, and previously recorded unreleased material with his band Michael and the Mumbles in 1968, later released as Microminiature Love in 2002.

== Early life ==
Michael Yonkers was born Michael Regis Yunker in Minneapolis, Minnesota, on October 3, 1947, and grew up in Edina, a Twin Cities suburb. His mother was a stay-at-home mom and his father was a supermarket worker. He attended Edina High School, and later studied at the University of Minnesota. His brother, Jim Yunker, was a drummer who played with him in several bands.

== Career ==
=== 1960s–1970s ===
Yonkers was inspired to pursue music in 1963 when he heard the song "Surfin' Bird" by Minnesota surf rock band the Trashmen. He would also be inspired by the distorted sound of old blues records, and began experimenting with ways to alter the sound of his electric guitar, including taking a razor blade to his amp's speakers.

His early bands included a surf-rock act known as the Vectors and a psychedelic rock group known as Michael and the Mumbles, which he recorded Microminiature Love with in 1968. The album was recorded in less than an hour of studio time. The band played each song only once. Sire Records showed an interest in releasing the album, but contract negotiations broke down in part because Yonkers was still only 20 years old and not legally able to sign without his parents' permission. Sire had also wanted Yonkers to move to New York and break up his band, which he refused to do, according to bandmate Jim Woerhle. Nevertheless, The Mumbles broke up shortly afterwards. Yonkers was then drafted into the army, but was discharged and did not have to serve in the Vietnam War because of a medical issue.

In 1971, Yonkers was badly injured when about 2,000 pounds of computer equipment fell on him at the warehouse where he was working, breaking his back in two places. A subsequent severe allergy to a dye used during his back surgery left him in chronic pain for decades afterward. He continued to record music and continue his electronic experiments in a home-built studio. He self-released four albums, including 1977's Lovely Gold, and collaborated with Barry Thomas Goldberg on his 1974 record Misty Flats. None of his work attracted a wide audience at the time.

=== 2000s–2010s ===
By the early 2000s, Yonkers' recordings in the late 1960s were rediscovered and compiled on the album Microminiature Love, released on vinyl by De Stijl Records in 2002, and later Sub Pop, who released it on CD in July 2003. This led to re-releases of other early albums, including the psych-folk album Grimwood, originally recorded in 1971 and reissued in 2007, as well as the early 1970s works Michael Lee Yonkers and Borders Of My Mind, both reissued on Drag City in 2014. Yonkers' most recent work includes three collaborations with Minneapolis indie-rock group The Blind Shake, Carbohydrate Hydrocarbons, Cold Town/Soft Zodiac, and Period. Their collaboration was documented in the 2011 film Hey Hey What by director Colin Frangos. He also released a solo album in 2007, Unbroken, with producer Chris Strouth.

In 2015, Mystra Records released a limited-edition set of Yonkers' experimental work from 2003-2007, Neverending Light Beam From Planet 00s/Deep Within Home Pianet/Plan A. Shindig! writer Jeanette Leech called the music "great: scratchy and uncompromising, but by no means untuneful or unstructured."

== Legacy ==
Musician John Dwyer, leader of San Francisco garage rock band Osees, paid tribute to Yonkers by covering 10 of his songs on the 2020 album Bug On Yonkers under his solo project Damaged Bug. Dwyer told the magazine American Songwriter about meeting Yonkers: “He was kind and seemingly a pretty regular guy, but he was also a weirdo, a rare bird, waving the true freak music flag, and it didn’t matter what kind of music he made, I loved it all.”

Cole Alexander of garage rock band Black Lips has said that Yonkers “kind of invented noise and drone guitar techniques," stating further that "when you think of how the Who, Jimi Hendrix and the Velvet Underground were pushing feedback at the time, he was more extreme than all three combined in terms of what he was doing.”

== Death ==
Yonkers died at Regions Hospital in Saint Paul, Minnesota, on April 20, 2026, due to complications related to cancer, a recent fall, and blood clots in his lungs. He was 78. His death was first reported on April 28 by Dwyer on his Instagram page. Minnesota-based news website Racket and St. Paul radio station The Current (KCMP) published longer obituaries soon after.

== Discography ==
- Michael Lee Yonkers (1972, reissued 2014)
- Goodby Sunball (1974)
- Borders of My Mind (1974, reissued 2014)
- Microminiature Love (2002, Sub Pop)
- It's Only the Yonkers (2005)
- Grimwood (2007, De Stijl Records)
- Unbroken (2007)
- Carbohydrate Hydrocarbons (2008, Farmgirl)
- Cold Town/Soft Zodiac (2009, Learning Curve)
- Bleed Out (2009)
- Lovely Gold (2010)
- Period (2011)
- Neverending Light Beam From Planet 00s/Deep Within Home Pianet/Plan A (2015, Mystra Records)
