= Sympathy Sessions =

Studio album by The Oblivians
- Released: April 5, 1996
- Recorded: 1996
- Genre: Garage punk, punk blues
- Label: Sympathy for the Record Industry

The Oblivians chronology
| Rock'n Roll Holiday: Live in Atlanta (1995) | Sympathy Sessions (1996) | Popular Favorites (1996) |

Professional ratings
Review scores
| Source | Rating |
|---|---|
| Allmusic | 4/5 stars |

Sympathy Sessions is the first compilation album released by the Oblivians. It was released on April 5, 1996 by Sympathy for the Record Industry. The album is a collection of two prior 10-inch releases, Never Enough and Six of the Best, as well as four additional single sides, all of which were recorded for and released by the label Sympathy for the Record Industry, hence the title.

== Track listing ==
1. Can't Last Another Night (Oblivians) - 1:51
2. Happy Blues (Oblivians) - 3:06
3. Never Enough (Oblivians) - 1:55
4. Feel Real Good (Oblivians) - 2:20
5. I'm Not a Sicko, There's a Plate in My Head (Oblivians) - 1:58
6. Five Hour Man (Oblivians) - 1:56
7. Shut My Mouth (Oblivians) - 1:57
8. Show Me What You Like (Oblivians) - 3:39
9. Clones (Oblivians) - 1:42
10. No Time (Oblivians) - 2:02
11. What Rock'n'roll Is All About (Oblivians) - 1:38
12. Memphis Creep (Oblivians) - 2:18
13. Something for Nothing (Oblivians) - 1:47
14. Big Black Hole (Oblivians) - 2:44
15. Can't Afford You (Oblivians) - 2:15
16. Kick Your Ass (Oblivians) - 1:52
17. No Butter for My Bread (Oblivians) - 1:50
18. Show Me Again (Oblivians) - 3:42

== Credits ==
- Oblivians - Main Performer
- Jack Oblivian - Guitar, Drums, Vocals
- Greg Oblivian - Guitar, Drums, Vocals
- Eric Oblivian - Guitar, Vocals, Drums
- Doug Easley - Engineer
- Davis McCain - Engineer
