= Eric Friedl =

American musician

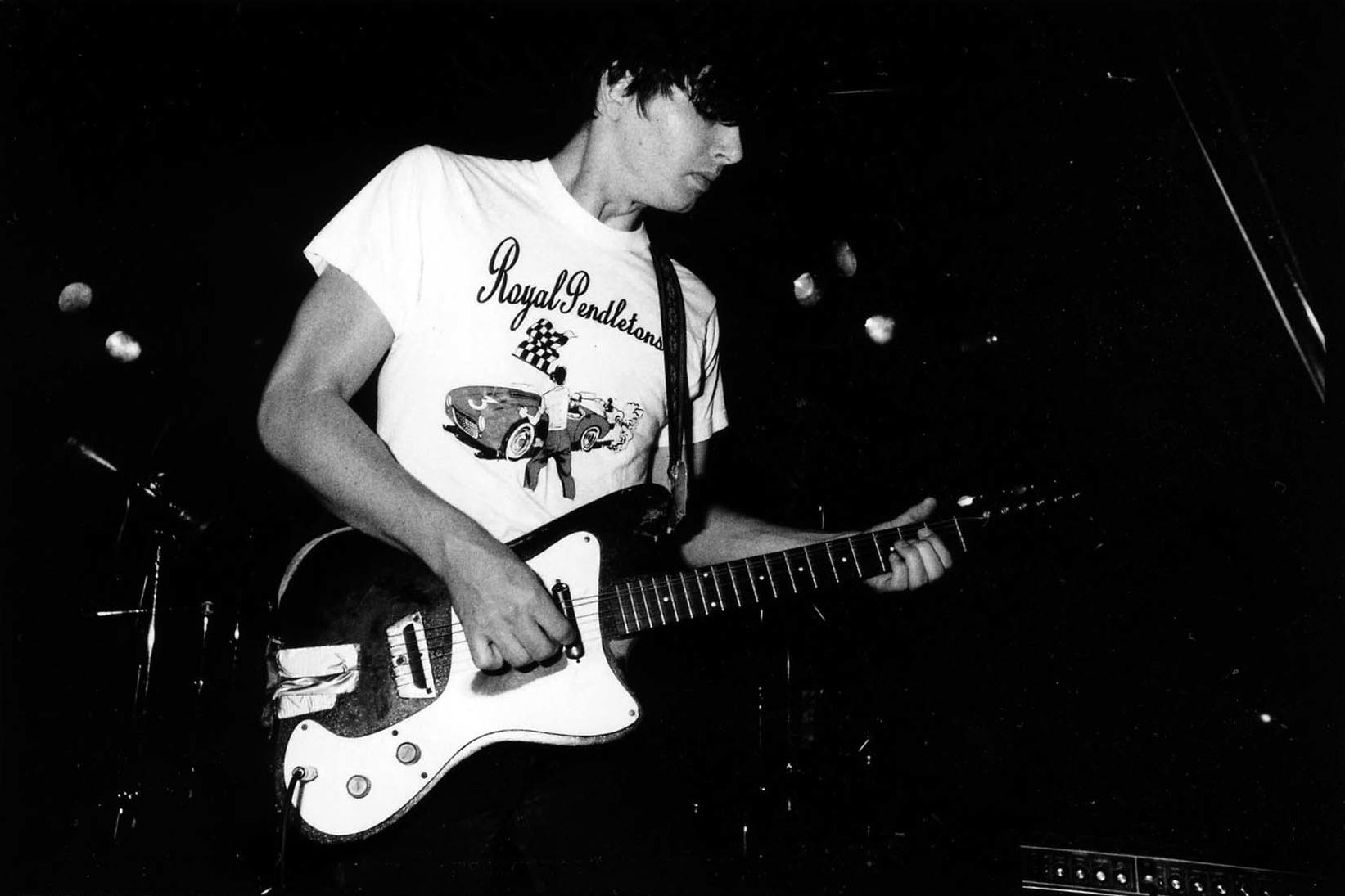
- Friedl performing with Oblivians in Japan

Background information
- Also known as: Eric Oblivian
- Genres: Garage rock, garage punk, R&B
- Occupations: singer; songwriter
- Instruments: vocals; guitar; drums
- Years active: Present
- Labels: Goner Records; Crypt Records; Sympathy for the Record Industry

Eric Friedl, also known by his stage name, Eric Oblivian, is a musician and the founder and owner of Goner Records, an independent music label and record store located in Memphis, Tennessee.

He was a founding member of the Memphis garage-rock band Oblivians, and has also been a member of or performed with the Bad Times, The Dutch Masters, the True Sons of Thunder, and the New Memphis Legs.

== Biography ==
=== Oblivians ===
Friedl was a founding member of the garage-rock outfit Oblivians. Like the other members, he sang, played drums, and provided guitar, switching instruments and vocal duties with the other members during performances. The Oblivians formed in 1993, releasing their first LP, Soul Food, in 1995. This was followed in 1996 by Sympathy Sessions, a compilation album featuring a collection of songs recorded with Doug Easley for the record label Sympathy for the Record Industry. The Oblivians released their second album, Popular Favorites, in 1996, and their third and final album, ...Play Nine Songs with Mr Quintron, in 1997.

=== Goner Records ===
Friedl started Goner in 1994, with the release of Japanese band Guitar Wolf's first LP, Guitar Rock!. Goner's second release was by The Oblivians, with their first LP, Soul Food. When Oblivians bandmate Greg Cartwright left his hometown of Memphis for Asheville, North Carolina, Goner records moved into Cartwright's Legba Records, setting up the Goner Records record store.

=== Personal life ===
Friedl grew up in Hawaii. He attended Pomona College, graduating in 1988.

== Discography ==
=== With Oblivians ===
Singles

- "Call The Shots" 7" (Goner Records, 1993, 2Gone)
- "Sunday You Need Love" 7" (Crypt, 1994, CR-044)
- "Now for the Hard Of Hearing From ... "Blow Their Cool" 7" (Estrus, 1994, ES 756)
- "Static Party" 7" (In The Red, 1994, ITR 018)
- "Go!Pill-Popper!" 7" (Drug Racer, 1996, 001)
- "Strong Come On" 7" (Crypt, 1996, CR-053)
- "Kick Your Ass" 7" (Sympathy for the Record Industry, 1996, SFTRI 412)

Splits

- Split CS with Impala (Goner Records/Power Of Bob, 1993, 0Gone/POB 103)
- Split 7" with Two Bo's Maniacs (Hate Records, 1997, hate 7)
- Split 7" with the Crime Kaisers (Active Detective, 1998, active detective record #1)

Albums

- Oblivians 10" (Sympathy for the Record Industry, 1994, SFTRI 304)
- Soul Food LP/CD (Crypt, 1995, CR-055)
- Live in Atlanta 8.19.94 LP (Negro Records, 1995, negro records 001)
- Six of the Best 10" (Sympathy for the Record Industry, 1996, SFTRI 383)
- Sympathy Sessions CD (Sympathy for the Record Industry, 1996, SFTRI 406)
- Walter Daniels Plays With Monsieur Jeffrey Evans & The Oblivians at Melissa's Garage 10" (Undone, 1995, UDR-0008-10)
- Popular Favorites LP/CD (Crypt, 1996, CR-065)
- ...Play Nine Songs with Mr. Quintron LP/CD (Crypt, 1997, CR-082)
- 17 Cum Shots LP (Bootleg, 1997, cat.no.?)
- Best of the Worst: 93–97 2xLP/CD (Sympathy for the Record Industry, 1999, SFTRI 584)
- On The Go LP (Goner Records, 2003, 12Gone)
- Barristers 95 [Live] (In the Red, 2009, ITR 182)

=== With the Bad Times ===
Albums

- Bad Times LP (Goner Records/Therapeutic Records, 2001, 11Gone/TIC-005)

=== With the Dutch Masters ===
Singles

- "Dutch Masters" 7" (Goner Records, 2004, 17Gone)
