= Crystal Gazing Luck Amazing =

Studio album by Compulsive Gamblers
- Released: June 20, 2000
- Genre: Garage rock
- Length: 31:48
- Label: Sympathy for the Record Industry

Compulsive Gamblers chronology
Bluff City (1999)	Crystal Gazing Luck Amazing (2000)	Live & Deadly: Memphis-Chicago (2003)

Professional ratings
Review scores
Source	Rating
AllMusic	4.5/5 stars

Crystal Gazing Luck Amazing is the third and final studio album by The Compulsive Gamblers. The album was released June 20, 2000 by Sympathy for the Record Industry. The album's lineup consisted of Gamblers mainstays Greg Cartwright and Jack Yarber on guitar and vocals. The Compulsive Gamblers began recording the album following their first European tour, which saw the addition of bassist Jeff Meier and keyboardist Brendan Lee Spengler to the Compulsive Gamblers' formerly three-piece outfit. The track Rock & Roll Nurse was covered by the band The Von Bondies on their 2001 debut album Lack of Communication.

The closing number, "Two Thieves" is dedicated to the memories of Jack Taylor (Gibson Bros, '68 Comeback) and Alan K. Crichton (The Male Nurse, Country Teasers), both of whom died drug related deaths.

Two songs off the album have been covered by Swedish rock band The Hives in live performances. The first of these was "Stop and Think it Over" at the Rock am Ring in Germany in 2003. The next song covered was the final song on the album "Two Thieves" in a performance on Musikbyrån on October 20, 2006.

== Track listing ==
1. The Way I Feel About You (Cartwright) - 2:29
2. Pepper Spray Boogie (Yarber) - 2:23
3. Whole Lotta Woman (Gordon, Hoggs, Robinson) - 3:15
4. Negative Jerk (Cartwright) - 2:14
5. Stop & Think It Over (Cartwright) - 3:19
6. I'm That Guy (Cartwright) - 2:57
7. Wait a Bit, Joe (Yarber) - 2:58
8. Your Happiness (Brown) - 2:30
9. Rock & Roll Nurse (Yarber) - 4:10
10. Two Thieves (Cartwright) - 5:32

== Personnel ==
- Jack Oblivian - guitar, vocals
- Greg Oblivian - guitar, vocals
- Jeff Meier - bass
- Brenden Lee Spengler - organ
- Dale Beavers - guitar
- Jim Diamond - engineer
