= Dangerous Game (album) =

Studio album by Mary Weiss
- Released: March 6, 2007
- Studios: Coyote, Brooklyn, New York
- Genres: Rock; pop
- Length: 40:17
- Label: Norton
- Producers: Greg Cartwright; Billy Miller

Dangerous Game is the only solo album by former Shangri-Las lead singer Mary Weiss. The album was released by Norton Records in 2007 and features Weiss backed by the Memphis garage rock band the Reigning Sound.

== Background ==
Mary Weiss was the lead singer of the 1960s girl group the Shangri-Las, who released a number of hit pop songs between 1964 and 1966. After their split in 1968, Weiss gave up singing, and worked for an architectural firm and as a commercial interior designer.

In 2005, Weiss left her job to return to music. She was persuaded to record a solo album, despite having not sung in almost 20 years. She recalled that she did not even sing along to the car radio.

== Production ==
Initially I didn't know how I'd feel about recording again. But when I walked back into the studio, I felt like I was home.

— Mary Weiss, 2007

Billy Miller, manager at Norton Records, met Weiss at a party in 2005 for Rhino Records' box set One Kiss Can Lead to Another: Girl Group Sounds Lost and Found. In 2007 she contacted him, and suggested that she might wish to record again. Miller proposed the Memphis garage rock band the Reigning Sound as collaborators. Weiss, after downloading the band's catalog, gave her approval.

Reigning Sound leader Greg Cartwright wrote most of the songs and a co-produced the album with Miller.

== Critical reception ==
Professional ratings
Review scores
Source	Rating
AllMusic	3.5/5 stars
Pitchfork	7.6/10

The reception of the album was generally positive.

Pitchfork critic Jess Harvell praised the album, summarizing that "from Cartwright's reverent licks to Weiss' surprisingly sturdy vocals, Dangerous Game is a small, self-contained triumph, an understated comeback", and that "the sunny throwback simplicity of the music is what makes Dangerous Game great."

Will Harris, writing for Q, described it as "a collection of songs which took the classic Shangri-Las sound and melded them with garage-rock sensibilities", and noted that "the end result was critically acclaimed, and [...] helped reestablish her reputation as one of the most memorable female vocalists to emerge during the 1960s."

Justin Moyer writing for the Washington City Paper gave a negative review, stating that "Dangerous Game shoves a pop icon into the spotlight but fails to show why she's still relevant".

Dan Forte, at Vintage Guitar, praised Weiss's voice ("Weiss sounds as good as ever"), and considered that "the album is true to Weiss' style but sounds absolutely up-to-date".

== Track listing ==
Dangerous Game track listing
No.	Title	Writer(s)	Length
1.	"My Heart Is Beating"	Greg Cartwright	2:59
2.	"Nobody Knows (But I Do)"	Dave Abramson / Andy Maltz	2:33
3.	"Break It One More Time"	Greg Cartwright	3:10
4.	"Stop and Think It Over"	Greg Cartwright	3:18
5.	"Cry About the Radio"	Greg Cartwright	2:28
6.	"You're Never Gonna See Me Cry"	Billy Miller / Andy Shernoff	3:50
7.	"Dangerous Game"	Greg Cartwright	2:30
8.	"Don't Come Back"	Greg Cartwright	3:33
9.	"I Just Missed You"	Andrew Robertson	2:57
10.	"Stitch in Time"	Greg Cartwright	3:20
11.	"Tell Me What You Want Me to Do"	John Felice / Richard Oakes	3:90
12.	"Heaven Only Knows" ( (Note: Reprising the Shangri-Las' song released on their 1965 album Shangri-Las-65!))	Jeff Barry / Ellie Greenwich	2:21
13.	"I Don't Care"	Greg Cartwright	2:25
14.	"You Can Stay with Me" ( (Note: The song ends with the sound of seagulls, a nod to the Shangri-Las' first hit "Remember (Walking in the Sand)"))	Greg Cartwright	3:23
Total length:			40:17

The streaming version of the album has the song "A Certain Guy" as bonus track.
