= Popular Favorites =

Studio album by Oblivians
- Released: September 10, 1996
- Recorded: December 20–21, 1995 – January 1996
- Studio: Funhouse Recording (New York City); Easley-McCain (Memphis, Tennessee)
- Genre: Garage punk, punk blues
- Length: 34:22
- Label: Crypt

Oblivians chronology
Sympathy Sessions (1996)	Popular Favorites (1996)	...Play 9 Songs with Mr Quintron (1997)

Popular Favorites is the second studio album by the Oblivians. It was released in 1996 on Crypt Records.

== Production ==
The album was recorded in Memphis and New York City. "Christina" is a cover of the Brownie McGhee song.

== Critical reception ==
Professional ratings
Review scores
Source	Rating
AllMusic	4.5/5 stars
The Commercial Appeal	3.5/4 stars

The Toronto Sun called the album "supremely filthy," writing that "it makes Jon Spencer sound like Pat Boone." Miami New Times deemed it "a 34-minute slugfest that highlights the band's blues chops ... and showcases their ability to pulverize a riff into fine powder." The Commercial Appeal noted that "for manic deranged 'blooze' with a healthy dose of unleashed libido, the Oblivians are truth in packaging."

== Track listing ==
1. "Christina" (McGhee) – 1:59
2. "Trouble" (Yarber/Oblivians) – 1:57
3. "The Leather" (Hurt/Modock/Pendleton) – 3:10
4. "Guitar Shop Asshole" (Friedl/Oblivians) – 1:25
5. "Hey Mama, Look at Sis" (Perry/Teel) – 1:46
6. "Part of Your Plan" (Cartwright/Oblivians) – 2:15
7. "Do the Milkshake" (Yarber/Oblivians) – 5:19
8. "Strong Come On" (Yarber/Oblivians) – 1:28
9. "She's a Hole" (Friedl/Oblivians) – 1:42
10. "Bad Man" (Cartwright/Oblivians) – 2:42
11. "He's Your Man" (Cartwright/Oblivians) – 2:14
12. "Drill" (Friedl/Fritsch/Oblivians) – 1:20
13. "You Better Behave" (Cartwright/Oblivians) – 1:45
14. "Pinstripe Willie" (Cartwright/Oblivians) – 1:26
15. "You Fucked Me Up, You Put Me Down" (Cartwright/Oblivians) – 1:56
16. "Emergency" (Friedl/Oblivians) – 1:59

== Personnel ==
- Greg Oblivian – Guitar, drums, vocals
- Eric Oblivian – Guitar, drums, vocals
- Jack Oblivian – Guitar, drums, vocals
