= The Blind Shake =

Punk-rock band from Minnesota

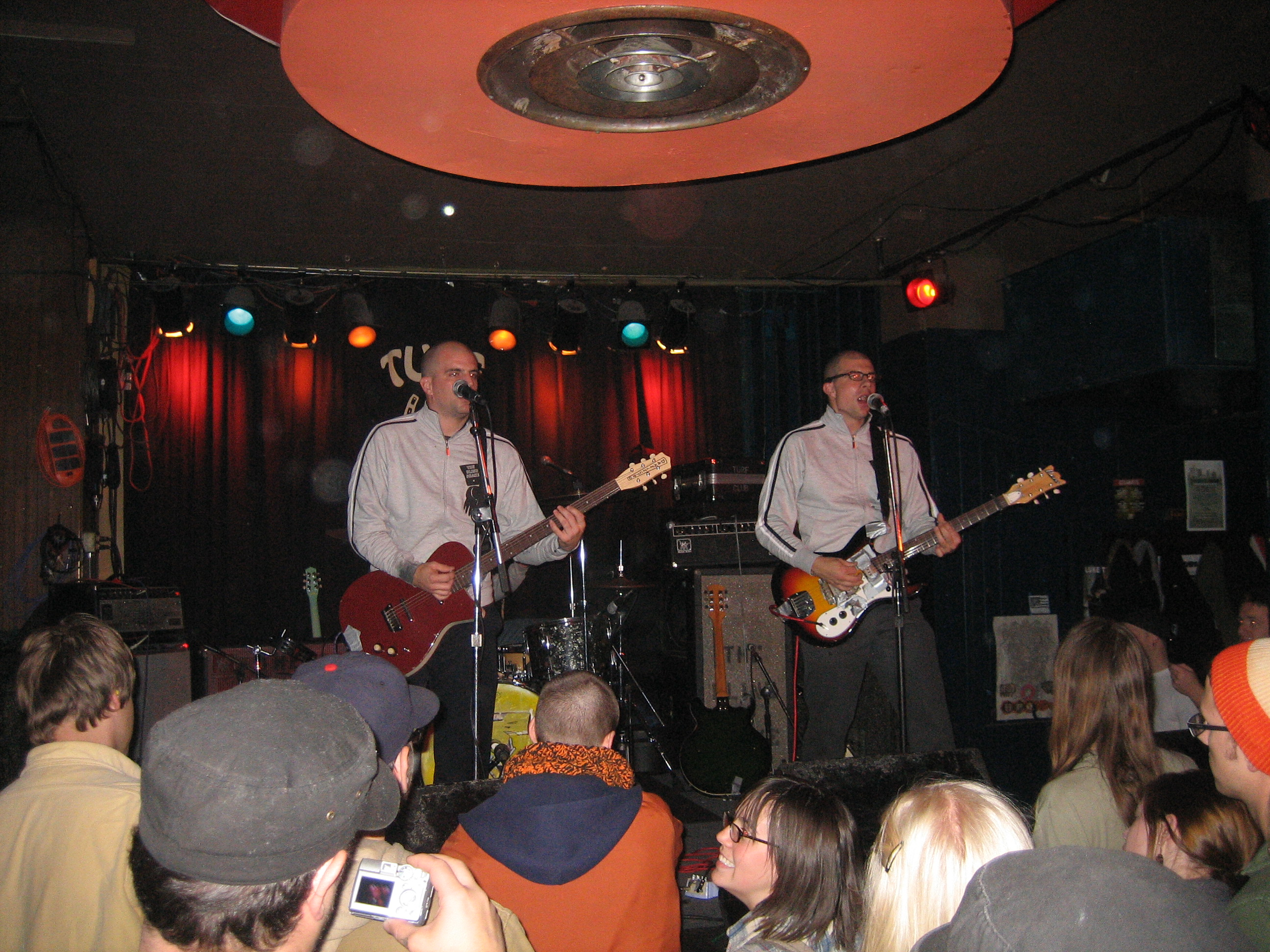
- The Blind Shake perform at the Turf Club in 2007

Background information
- Origin: Minneapolis, Minnesota, United States
- Genres: Punk rock
- Years active: 2005-
- Members: Jim Blaha (vocals/guitar); Mike Blaha (vocals/guitar); Dave Roper (drums)

The Blind Shake are an American punk rock band formed in Minneapolis by brothers Jim (vocals/guitar) and Mike Blaha (vocals/guitar), with Dave Roper on drums. They have released four albums and featured as a backing band for a number of artists, including John Reis and Michael Yonkers.

== Biography ==
The brothers developed an interest in music at an early age, when they were "in Third and Fourth grade, we had a twenty dollar Sears catalogue acoustic". Both began to study guitar with Mike receiving lessons while Jim abandoned the instrument until he was 23. Roper and Mike Blaha had played together in bands during their college years. Inspired by the simple approach of the punk rock, the two began playing together where Mike would use a baritone guitar. In 2004 they released a self-titled single.

In 2005, the band released their debut album Rizzograph. That year, they were named one of the top 10 new bands in Minnesota in the annual "Picked To Click" band poll in Minneapolis' City Pages.

Rizzograph was followed by Carmel in 2007, also on Learning Curve Records. In the same year they backed Yonkers on the album Carbohydrates Hydrocarbons. In July 2011 they released the album Seriousness.

In 2013 the band released Key to a False Door through Castle Face Records. Liquid Hip noted that the album was "significantly more diverse than previous outings".

On April 10, 2015, The Blind Shake Released 'Fly Right', through Slovenly Recordings.

In October 2016 the band released Celebrate Your Worth through Goner Records.

== Discography ==
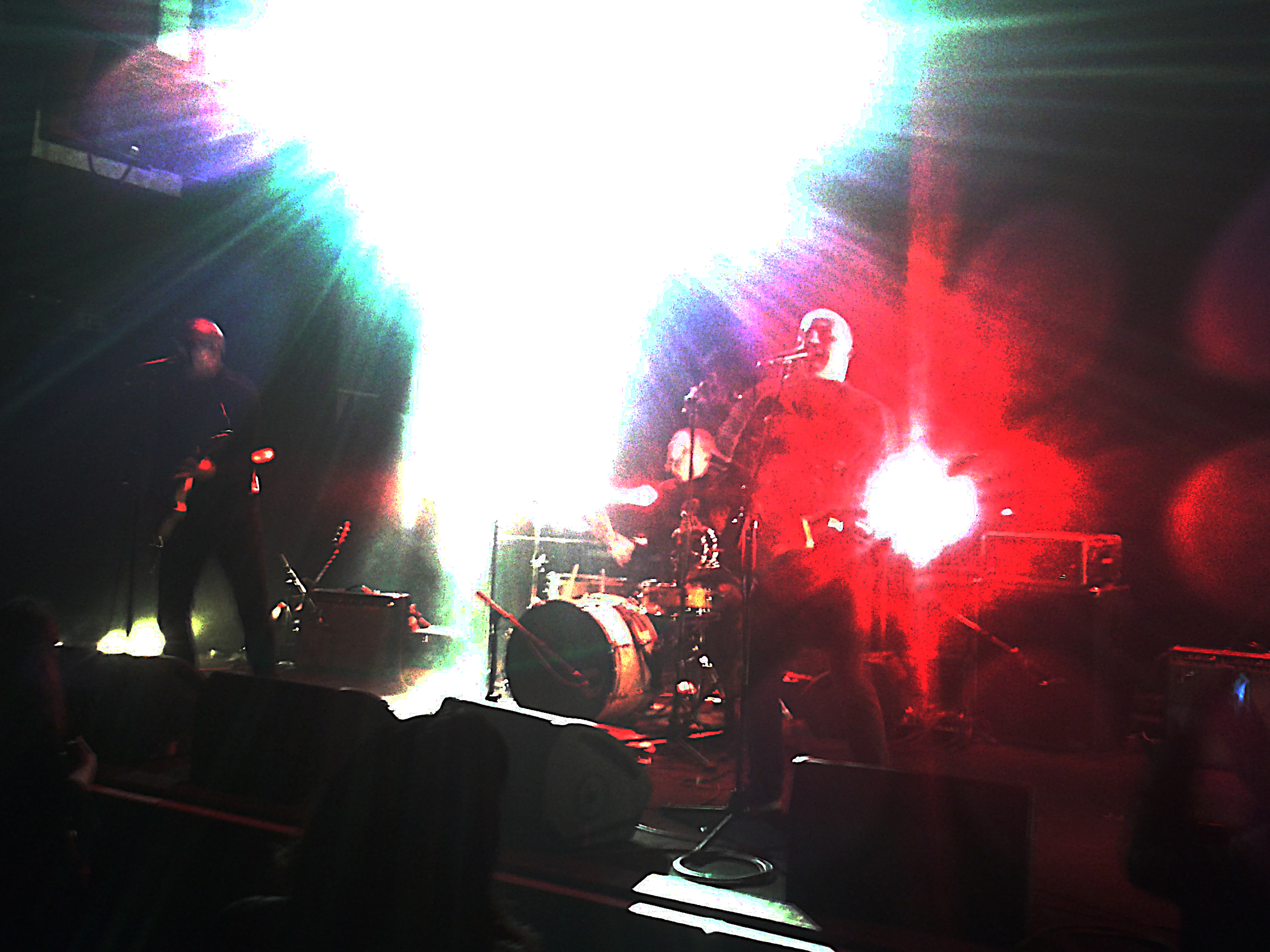
The Blind Shake at Festival Spiderland 2015

- Rizzograph (2005)
- Carmel (2007)
- Seriousness (2011)
- Carbohydrates Hydrocarbons with Michael Yonkers (2007)
- Michael Yonkers with the Blind Shake Split (2009)
- Period. with Michael Yonkers (2011)
- Key to a False Door (2013)
- Breakfast Of Failures (2014)
- Fly Right (2015)
- Modern Surf Classics with Swami John Reis (2015)
- Celebrate Your Worth (2016)
