= ...Play Nine Songs with Mr. Quintron =

Studio album by Oblivians
- Released: 1997
- Recorded: January 3, 1997, at Cotton Row Studio
- Genre: Garage rock
- Length: 27:14
- Label: Crypt
- Producer: Steve Moller

Oblivians chronology
Popular Favorites (1996)	...Play Nine Songs with Mr. Quintron (1997)	Best of the Worst: 93-97 (1999)

Professional ratings
Review scores
Source	Rating
Allmusic	link

...Play Nine Songs with Mr. Quintron is the third studio album by the Oblivians, released in 1997 on Crypt Records. The album features noted Ninth Ward nightclub organist Mr. Quintron playing organ and percussion on a number of tracks.

== Overview ==
The album's concept came about in part due to Greg Cartwright's fondness for gospel music: "Greg had been really into black gospel music, and wanted to try some gospels songs in Oblivians fashion, but only if they were kinda screwed up. We didn't want to try to come off as religious, but we didn't want to make a joke out of the whole thing, either. It was a tribute to the spirit of the music, more the holy ghost than the saviour."

The album was recorded in a single day: "Quintron took a bus up to Memphis from New Orleans for 8 hours, and we took him to my (Eric "Oblivian" Friedl's) house to play him some songs that we were thinking of covering." Mr. Quintron began arranging his contributions upon arrival, without any prior knowledge of the content of the album. "We had sent him a tape of the songs but it never got delivered to him- so he came up not knowing what songs we wanted to do!" The album was recorded in eight hours, at which point Mr. Quintron returned home via bus to New Orleans. "He (Quintron) was on a bus for eight hours then in a studio for eight hours and then we took him to the bus the same day, so he had a tough 24 hours."

The dramatic shift in styles between this album and its predecessors was one of the reasons for the eventual break up of the band. As Greg Cartwright once explained, "this is really why the band ended - the ...Play 9 record sounded more like a Gamblers record than an Oblivians record. I'm not sure Eric was happy with the direction of the band cause he has more of a punk rock aesthetic, but it was a good finale."

== Track listing ==
All tracks are written by Greg Cartwright/Oblivians, except where noted.

No.	Title	Length
1.	"Feel All Right"	3:26
2.	"Live the Life" (Traditional)	3:12
3.	"I May be Gone" (Blind Charles White/Oblivians)	3:27
4.	"I Don't Wanna Live Alone"	1:56
5.	"Final Stretch"	3:52
6.	"What's the Matter Now" (Traditional)	2:39
7.	"Ride that Train"	3:38
8.	"If Mother Knew"	2:53
9.	"Mary Lou" (Jesse Young/Sam Ling)	2:11

== Personnel ==
- Greg Oblivian – Lead and backing vocals, guitar
- Eric Oblivian – Lead and backing vocals, guitar
- Jack Oblivian – Drums, backing vocals
- Mr. Quintron – Organ, percussion
