= Daddy Rockin' Strong: A Tribute to Nolan Strong & the Diablos =

Daddy Rockin Strong: A Tribute to Nolan Strong & The Diablos

Compilation album by Various artists
- Released: 2010
- Recorded: 2009–2010
- Genres: Rock and roll, garage rock
- Labels: The Wind, Norton, Burger
- Producers: Rich Tupica, Billy Miller

Daddy Rockin' Strong: A Tribute to Nolan Strong & the Diablos is tribute album recorded by various artists in celebration of singer Nolan Strong. The album was first released in a vinyl-only edition by The Wind Records and distributed by Norton Records. On January 21, 2013, Burger Records re-issued the compilation on cassette tape.

The record was compiled in memory of Strong, a Detroit-based R&B singer known for his high tenor voice that influenced a young Smokey Robinson. Strong, who signed to Fortune Records in 1954, was a sensation in R&B music before the creation of Motown Records. He is best known for his hit songs "The Wind" and "Mind Over Matter". He died in 1977 and is buried in Detroit. Because Fortune Records ceased operations in the mid-1980s, Strong's music has remained out of print since then.

The album features 13 songs written by, or associated with Nolan Strong. Performers mostly come from the rock and roll, punk and garage bands style, and include the Dirtbombs, Reigning Sound, Mark Sultan, Wreckless Eric & Amy Rigby, Outrageous Cherry, the Hentchmen, Cub Koda, Andre Williams, and Lenny Kaye, among others.

== Reception ==
The tribute album received positive reviews from a number of publications, including published reviews from Razorcake and Uncut magazine. AllMusic hailed the compilation as "one of the best tribute albums of recent memory." The Los Angeles Times noted, "each cut is a tender love ballad to an overlooked legend."

== Track listing ==
1. "The Wind" - Mark Sultan
2. "Daddy Rockin' Strong" - The Dirtbombs
3. "You're the Only Girl, Delores" - Cub Koda
4. "Yeah, Baby (It's Because of You)" - Outrageous Cherry
5. "The Way You Dog Me Around" - Andre Williams & the A-Bones
6. "Do You Remember What You Did" - Danny Kroha & the Del Torros
7. "Mind Over Matter" - Reigning Sound
8. "I Want to Be Your Happiness" - Wreckless Eric & Amy Rigby
9. "Real True Love" - The A-Bones
10. "Mambo of Love" - The Hentchmen
11. "Try Me One More Time" - Demon's Claws
12. "Harriett, It's You" - Gentleman Jesse & His Men
13. "I Wanna Know" - Lenny Kaye
