= Too Much Guitar =

Studio album by Reigning Sound
- Released: May 4, 2004
- Recorded: 2003–04
- Studio: Legba and Easley McCain Recording, Memphis, Tennessee
- Genre: Garage punk, punk blues
- Length: 36:57
- Label: In the Red
- Producer: Greg Cartwright

Reigning Sound chronology
Time Bomb High School (2002)	Too Much Guitar (2004)	Live at Maxwell's (2005)

Professional ratings
Review scores
Source	Rating
AllMusic	4/5 stars
Pitchfork Media	8.3/10

Too Much Guitar is the third album by the Reigning Sound. It was released in 2004 by In the Red Records. Originally, bandleader Greg Cartwright toyed with the idea of calling the album PILL-POPPING MOM ONLY TAKING WHAT SHE NEEDS TO GET BY, a headline which he had seen in a Commercial Appeal medical advice column, but scrapped the idea when the album began to change direction musically.

The album was recorded after original member and guitarist/keyboard player Alex Greene left the band in 2003, leaving lead vocalist and guitarist Greg Cartwright, bassist Jeremy Scott, and drummer Greg Roberson to carry the album through to completion as a three-piece.

The album contains ten original songs written by the band and four cover songs recorded while the band split their time laying down tracks in Memphis and Asheville, North Carolina. Several tracks were recorded at Cartwright's own now-defunct record store, Legba Records, in Memphis, Tennessee. The album was engineered by Lost Sounds bandmates Jay Reatard and Alicja Trout.

== Track listing ==
Too Much Guitar LP/CD (In The Red, 2004, ITR 107)

1. We Repel Each Other (Cartwright) - 3:00
2. Your Love Is a Fine Thing (Cartwright) - 2:43
3. If You Can't Give Me Everything (Cartwright) - 2:41
4. You Got Me Hummin' (Hayes, Porter) - 2:26
5. When You Touch Me (Cartwright) - 2:57
6. Funny Thing (Cartwright) - 3:07
7. Get It! (Ballard) - 2:03
8. I'll Cry (Cartwright) - 2:20
9. Drowning (Cartwright) - 3:43
10. Uptight Tonight (Dickinson) - 2:25
11. Excedrine Headache #265 (Cartwright) - 3:24
12. Let Yourself Go (Carpet Baggers) - 2:39
13. So Easy (Cartwright) - 2:07
14. Medication (Cartwright) - 1:23

== Personnel ==
- Greg Cartwright - Guitar, Vocals, Producer, Percussion, Group Member, Harmonica
- Alex Greene - Organ, Guitar
- Jeremy Scott - Bass, Group Member, Vocals (Background)
- Greg Roberson - Drums, Group Member
- Alicja Trout - Engineer
- Jay Rensley - Engineer
- Doug Easley - Engineer
