= Slovenly Recordings =

Independent record label

- Founded: 2002
- Founder: Pete Menchetti
- Genre: punk rock; garage rock
- Country of origin: United States
- Location: Reno, Nevada
- Official website: www.slovenly.com

Slovenly Recordings is an independent record label founded by Pete Menchetti in 2002. The label is based in Reno, Nevada, and has offices in Pennsylvania, Berlin, and Tokyo.

== History ==
In 2002 Pete Menchetti formed Slovenly Recordings after the dissolution of his previous record label, 702 Records. Menchetti started Slovenly with a mission to release garage rock and psych influenced punk rock from around the globe. The Reno, Nevada headquarters shares space with Menchetti’s other business venture, Sticker Guy.

In early 2017, Slovenly Recordings became the North American supplier of Crypt Records. The label also has three imprints: Black Gladiator, which is run by Slovenly label manager DJ Bazooka Joe; Mondo Mongo, which features non-English speaking bands; and I Shit in the Milk, featuring trash bands from Spain.

== Current Artists ==
- Acid Baby Jesus
- Andy California
- The Anomalys
- Avenue Z
- Bazooka
- Biznaga
- Blaha
- The Blind Shake
- Boston babyes
- Brad Pott
- The Cavemen
- Choke Chains
- The Dirtiest
- Dirty Fences
- Duchess Says
- Gay Anniversary
- Gino and the Goons
- Hellshovel
- The Hipshakes
- J.C. Satàn
- Komodina 3
- Las Ardillas
- Les Lullies
- Lo-Lite
- Los Vigilantes
- Magnetix
- The Monsieurs
- Moral Panic
- Moron's Morons
- Mouthbreathers
- Nightmare Boyzzz
- The Okmoniks
- Paint Fumes
- The Penetrators
- Personal and the Pizzas
- Priors
- Pronto
- The Psyched
- Puff!
- Pypy
- Red Mass
- The Rippers
- Scraper
- Sick Thoughts
- The Spits
- Stalins of Sound
- Subsonics
- Sultan Bathery
- Thee Oops
- Tommy & the Commies
- Useless Eaters
- Van Buren Wheels
- Wau Y Los Arrghs!!!
- Wet Ones
- Xenu & the Thetans

== Past Artists and Associated Acts ==
- Black Lips
- Greg Cartwright
- Hollywood Sinners
- Nobunny
- Reigning Sound

== See also ==
- List of record labels
