= Rock'n Roll Holiday: Live in Atlanta =

Live album by Oblivians
- Released: 1995
- Recorded: August 1994
- Genre: Garage punk
- Length: 43:21
- Label: Sympathy for the Record Industry

Oblivians chronology
Soul Food (1995)	Rock'n Roll Holiday: Live in Atlanta (1995)	Sympathy Sessions (1996)

Professional ratings
Review scores
Source	Rating
Allmusic	4/5 stars

Rock'n Roll Holiday: Live in Atlanta was an early live show of Memphis-based garage punk rockers Oblivians, recorded in August 1994 in Atlanta, Georgia. The recording was originally issued in 1995 as a vinyl bootleg on Negro Records, of which 500 copies were produced. It was later re-released by Sympathy for the Record Industry in 2003 on both vinyl LP and CD.

== Track listing ==
1. "Motorcycle Leather Boy" (Milan the Leather Boy) – 3:24
2. "Viet Nam War Blues" (Lightnin' Hopkins) – 3:01
3. "Jim Cole" – 1:17
4. "Feel Real Good" – 2:22
5. "Static Party" – 1:55
6. "And Then I Fucked Her" – 2:33
7. "Someday You'll Be Loved" – 3:04
8. "Love Killed My Brain" – 2:24
9. "No Reason to Live" – 1:42
10. "Plate in My Head" – 2:12
11. "Shut My Mouth" – 2:36
12. "Happy Blues" – 5:31
13. "Blew My Cool" – 2:14
14. "Shake Your Ass" – 3:38
15. "Nigger Rich" (Jack Oblivian/Richard Peeples) – 2:40
16. "Never Change" – 2:46

== Credits ==
- Eric Oblivian – Guitar, drums, vocals
- Greg Oblivian – Guitar, drums, vocals
- Jack Oblivian – Guitar, drums, vocals
