= Mary Weiss =

American pop music vocalist (1948–2024)

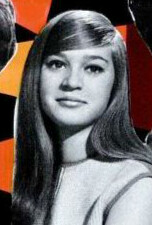
- Weiss in 1964

Background information
- Born: Mary Louise Weiss; December 28, 1948; New York City, U.S.
- Died: January 19, 2024 (aged 75) Palm Springs, California, U.S.
- Genres: Pop
- Occupation: Singer
- Instrument: Vocals
- Labels: Red Bird; Norton
- Formerly of: The Shangri-Las
- Spouse: Edward Ryan

Mary Louise Weiss (December 28, 1948 – January 19, 2024) was an American singer and interior designer, best known as the lead singer of the Shangri-Las in the 1960s. Their single "Leader of the Pack" went to number one on the Billboard Hot 100 in 1964. She had little involvement in the music scene for decades, returning in 2007 to record her first and only solo album with Norton Records.

== Early life ==
Mary Louise Weiss was born on December 28, 1948, in Cambria Heights, Queens, in New York City. She had an older sister, Betty, and an older brother, George. Her father, Harry Weiss, died when she was six weeks old and her mother, Elizabeth (née Treubig), brought up three children in poverty, surviving on welfare and handouts. Mary sang in school plays and choirs and she listened to her brother, an Elvis fan, and his friends performing popular songs of the day. She attended her first Everly Brothers concert in 1963 at Freedomland U.S.A. at age 14.

== Career ==
=== The Shangri-Las ===
In high school, Weiss and her sister Betty became friends with twins Mary Ann and Margie Ganser. In 1963 the four girls formed a group, taking their name from a neighbourhood restaurant, and they sang at local dances and hops. They came to the attention of local producer Artie Ripp, who signed them to Kama Sutra Productions. Their first single, 1963's "Simon Says", was a flop. After recording demos, signing with Red Bird Records in 1964 and making it to the Brill Building, where they worked with hit-writing team Jeff Barry and Ellie Greenwich, they recorded "Remember (Walking in the Sand)", their first hit; and "Leader of the Pack", both co-written and produced by Shadow Morton. "Leader of the Pack" went to number one on the Billboard Hot 100 charts in 1964. "Remember (Walking in the Sand)" had reached number five in the US charts, competing with six singles by the Beatles and hits by the Rolling Stones and other British groups. Weiss and the Shangri-Las played support at concerts by the Beatles and the Stones.

The Shangri-Las became a leading girl group in the 1960s. After several years together, they split in 1968 and Weiss went to San Francisco to try a different lifestyle. She gave up singing, married Ed Ryan, and went to work for an architectural firm. She later became a commercial interior designer in New York. She later occasionally performed shows with the Shangri-Las during the 1970s, which led to an unsuccessful attempt to re-form the band with Sire Records in 1976. In 1989, the Shangri-Las reunited for a Cousin Brucie show at The Meadowlands in New Jersey.

In 2019, the Rock and Roll Hall of Fame in Cleveland, Ohio, honored the Shangri-Las song "Leader of the Pack" in its Singles category.

=== Solo album ===
In 2005, Weiss left her job in commercial interiors to return to music. She was persuaded to record a solo album, Dangerous Game, in 2007, despite having not sung in almost 20 years. She recalled that she did not even sing along to the car radio. In March 2007, Norton Records released Dangerous Game, a critically acclaimed album on which she was backed by the Reigning Sound.

== Personal life and death ==
After the Shangri-Las, Weiss took a job as a purchasing agent in New York City in Manhattan. She recalled in a 2007 interview, "I went to work for an architectural firm, and I was seriously into it. Then I got into commercial interiors, huge projects, buildings." She later became the chief purchasing agent and ran the commercial furniture dealership. In the late 1980s, she managed a furniture store and was an interior designer. By 2001, she was a furniture consultant to New York businesses.

Weiss died from chronic obstructive pulmonary disease at her home in Palm Springs, California, on January 19, 2024, at the age of 75 leaving her sister Betty as the only living member of the Shangri-Las. Weiss is survived by her third husband, Ed Ryan.
