= Compulsive Gamblers =

American garage rock band

The Compulsive Gamblers
- Origin: Memphis, Tennessee, U.S.
- Genres: Garage rock, punk blues, garage punk
- Years active: 1990—1993, 1998—2003
- Labels: Boiler Room, Lemon Peel Records, Sympathy for the Record Industry
- Members: Greg Cartwright; Jack Yarber; Rod Thomas; Jeff Meier; Brenden Lee Spengler
- Past members: Philip Tubb; Greg Easterly; Paul Blanda; Greg Roberson

Compulsive Gamblers were an American garage rock group formed in Memphis, Tennessee, in 1990 by Greg Cartwright and Jack Yarber, both future members of the Oblivians.

== History ==
=== First incarnation ===
Originally known as "The Painkillers", the band was founded in 1990 by future Oblivians frontmen Greg Cartwright and Jack Yarber, both of whom shared vocal and guitar duties. With the addition of bassist Fields Trimble, keyboardist Philip "Flipper" Tubb, drummer Rod "Bushrod" Thomas, and fiddler Greg Easterly, the band soon adopted the name the "Compulsive Gamblers", and set to work recording their first 7-inch, Joker. The album was released a year later, and was followed by two further 7-inch recordings, Church Goin' and Goodtime Gamblers. According to Cartwright, one of the themes of the Church Goin' 7-inch, and of the Compulsive Gamblers in general, was "the self destructive gambler, these people who just can't fix their lives and just fuck up at every turn. They need to do something. So that was the idea for "Church Goin'", but it wasn't fully realized..."

The band struggled through 1990 and 1991 without any major gigs or a set band, but by the following year the band's fortunes had started to turn. By 1992 the band had a concrete lineup and had begun to form a unique sound, however, just as the Gamblers luck seemed to be looking up the band began to drift apart.

In 1993 Cartwright was offered a place to stay and record in New York with singer Casey Scott, which for a time he accepted. Cartwright played guitar on Casey Scott's "Creep City" album that was released on Capitol Records in 1993. Around this time the other members of the band began to venture off on their own as well, leaving only Yarber and Easterly to try to keep the band afloat. Upon Cartwright's return to Memphis in the summer of 1993, he and Yarber decided to split their time between the Gamblers and a side project called the Oblivians. By 1995, Thomas and Easterly had relocated to New Orleans, and Cartwright and Yarber focused their creative efforts solely on the Oblivians, resulting in the ultimate breakup of the first incarnation of the Gamblers.

Label interest for the Compulsive Gamblers had always been fleeting, and the band was unable to garner much interest while the band was still together. As Yarber explained, the Compulsive Gamblers “did two 7-inches and recorded a bunch of songs on home recordings. We recorded in Easley (Recording studio), but we never really had an album...our CD came out after The Oblivians started playing.” Eventually their 7" recordings were compiled in LP format under the title Gambling Days are Over and released by Sympathy for the Record Industry.

=== Second incarnation ===
After the breakup of the Oblivians, Cartwright and Yarber reformed the Compulsive Gamblers, this time as a three-piece with Rod Thomas back on drums. With this lineup they released the album Bluff City in 1999. Bassist Jeff Meier and keyboardist Brendan Lee Spengler were added to the lineup following a European tour, and in this incarnation the band released the studio album Crystal Gazing Luck Amazing and the live album Live & Deadly: Memphis-Chicago, their final release before again disbanding.

== Line ups ==
Compulsive Gamblers I: (1991–1993, first three singles and "Gambling Days Are Over")

Jack Yarber: guitar, vocals

Greg Cartwright: guitar, vocals

Bushrod Thomas: drums

Fields Trimble: bass

Greg Easterly: violin

Compulsive Gamblers II: (after The Oblivians broke up, 1998, Bluff City LP/CD)

Jack Yarber: guitar, vocals

Greg Cartwright: guitar, vocals

Bushrod Thomas: drums

Compulsive Gamblers III: (Spring 1999 US Tour)

Jack Yarber: guitar, vocals

Greg Cartwright: guitar, vocals

Jeff Meier: bass

Bushrod Thomas: drums

Compulsive Gamblers IV: (After the Spring 1999 US Tour, Crystal Gazing, Luck Amazing LP/CD)

Jack Yarber: guitar, vocals

Greg Cartwright: guitar, vocals

Jeff Meier: bass

Brenden Lee Spengler: organ

Dale Beavers: guitar

Other former Members:

Greg Roberson (also former member of Reigning Sound) played on the Live & Deadly LP (Sympathy).

== Discography ==
=== Singles ===
- "Joker" (Boiler Room, 1992, BR 001)
- "Church Goin'" (Lemon Peel Records, 1992, LP001 - LP002)
- "Goodtime Gamblers" (Boiler Room, 1995, BR 002)

=== Albums ===
- Gambling Days are Over (Sympathy For The Record Industry, 1995, SFTRI 372)
- Bluff City (Sympathy For The Record Industry, 1999, SFTRI 570)
- Crystal Gazing Luck Amazing (Sympathy For The Record Industry, 2000, SFTRI 572)
- Live & Deadly: Memphis-Chicago (Sympathy For The Record Industry, 2003, SFTRI 698)
