= Oblivians =

American garage punk band

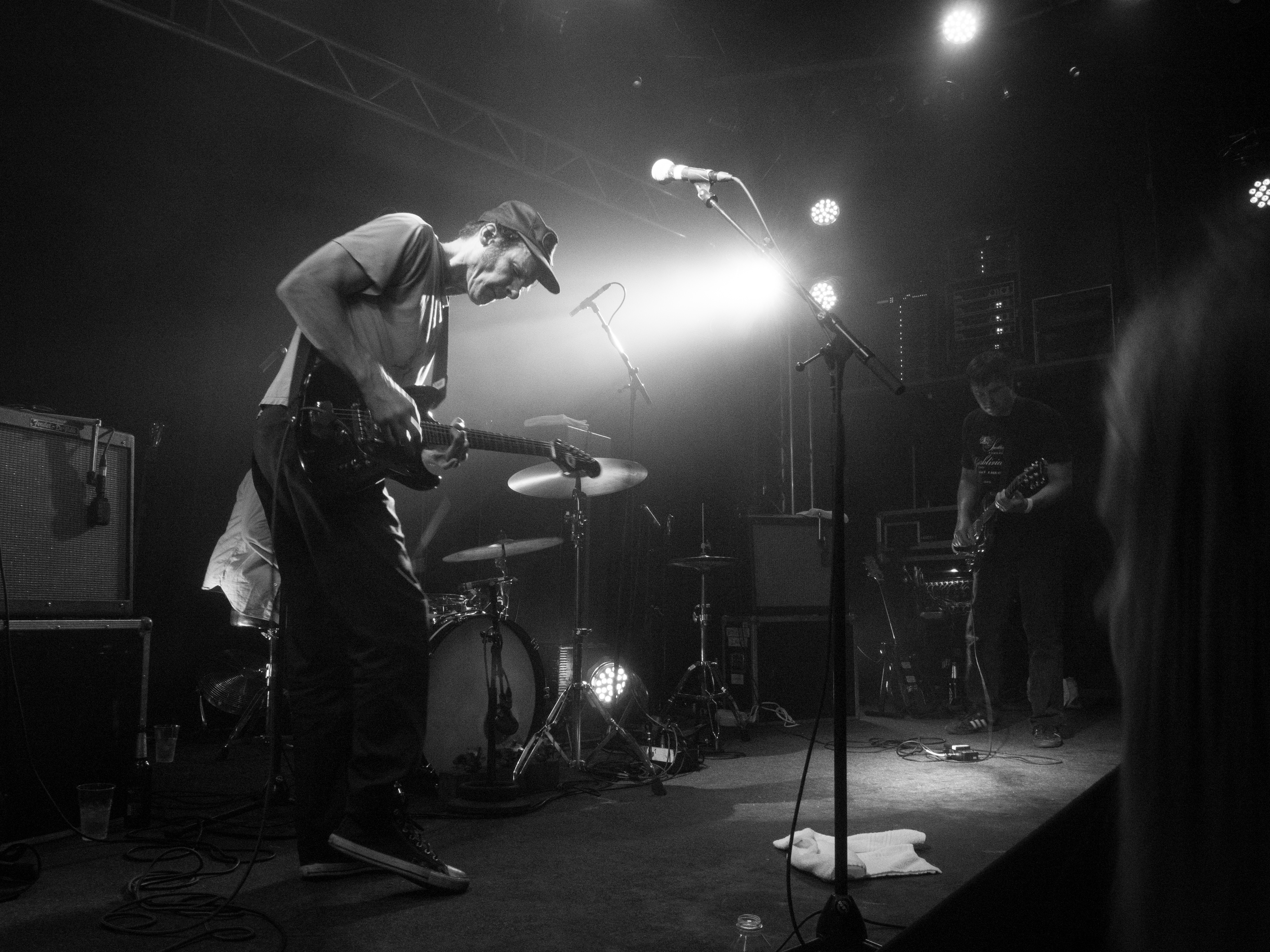
- Oblivians in 2016

Background information
- Origin: Memphis, Tennessee, United States
- Genres: Garage punk; garage rock; punk blues
- Years active: 1993–1998; 2012–present
- Labels: Crypt; Goner; Sympathy for the Record Industry; In The Red
- Past members: Greg Cartwright; Jack Yarber; Eric Friedl

The Oblivians are an American garage punk trio founded in 1993. In the 1990s, their blues-infused brand of bravado, crudely recorded music made them one of the most popular and prominent bands within the underground garage rock scene.

Formed in Memphis, Tennessee, the band consisted of three members—Greg Cartwright, Jack Yarber, and Eric Friedl—who alternated between instruments on stage and in the studio, each member serving as vocalist, guitarist, and drummer, in turn. The band recorded four LPs, as well as a number of EPs and singles, typically recording songs live in the studio.

The band has performed numerous reunion shows since disbanding in 1998, including a highly anticipated 2009 European reunion tour with The Gories, who also reformed to co-headline.

Oblivians released the studio album Desperation on May 28, 2013 through In The Red Records.

== History ==
The Oblivians began performing together in the summer of 1993. At the time of the Oblivians' inception, both Greg Cartwright and Jack Yarber were members of the garage-rock band the Compulsive Gamblers, however, following the departure of most of the band's members from the band's home base in Memphis, the two decided to continue playing together in a more compact incarnation of their former band, recruiting Shangri-la Records employee and future Goner Records founder Eric Friedl to round out the three-piece. Within a short time of the group's formation the band had written much of the material that would appear on their first recording, the posthumously released "On the Go." As almost the entire album was written over the first weekend following the group's decision to play together, Yarber, who had been staying in New Orleans with former Compulsive Gamblers Drummer Rod Thomas hoping to continue with his former band in some form, felt the Oblivians had enough promise for him to return to Memphis. Upon Yarber's return, the Oblivians got a gig opening for Southern Culture on the Skids, their first show as a three-piece.

=== Musical style ===
The Oblivians' sound was much harsher than the Compulsive Gambler's sound had been, owing both to Friedl's influence on the band, and to some of the music the members had taken to heart since the Gamblers disbanded, including Thee Headcoats and The Gories. The music was also much more stripped-down than that of the Compulsive Gamblers; the Oblivians had no bass player and no bass drum on their drum kit, instead using only two guitars and a standard drum kit between the three of them. All three members shared songwriting responsibilities, and each member of the group supplied vocals, guitar, and drums, when recording. During live performances, it was not uncommon for members to switch back and forth multiple times between a shared set of instruments. The band did catch a certain amount of flack for their unconventional setup; while the band was working at Sun Studios the group was refused a space to record until they procured a bassist. Despite being offered a chance to record for free, with the only condition being that they add a bass player to the lineup, the band opted to record elsewhere rather than conform to the request.

=== Naming the band ===
The group underwent a few name changes before finally choosing their eventual moniker. The group was originally known as PP (an abbreviation for Pontius Pilate) and the Naildrivers. The name lasted for only one show, and after a short stint as the Gentlemen of Leisure, the group members eventually renamed their outfit the Oblivians. With a definitive name in place, each member adopted a Ramones-style surname; Cartwright became Greg Oblivian, Yarber became Jack Oblivian, and Friedl became Eric Oblivian. The surnames became an integral part of the band.

=== Touring ===
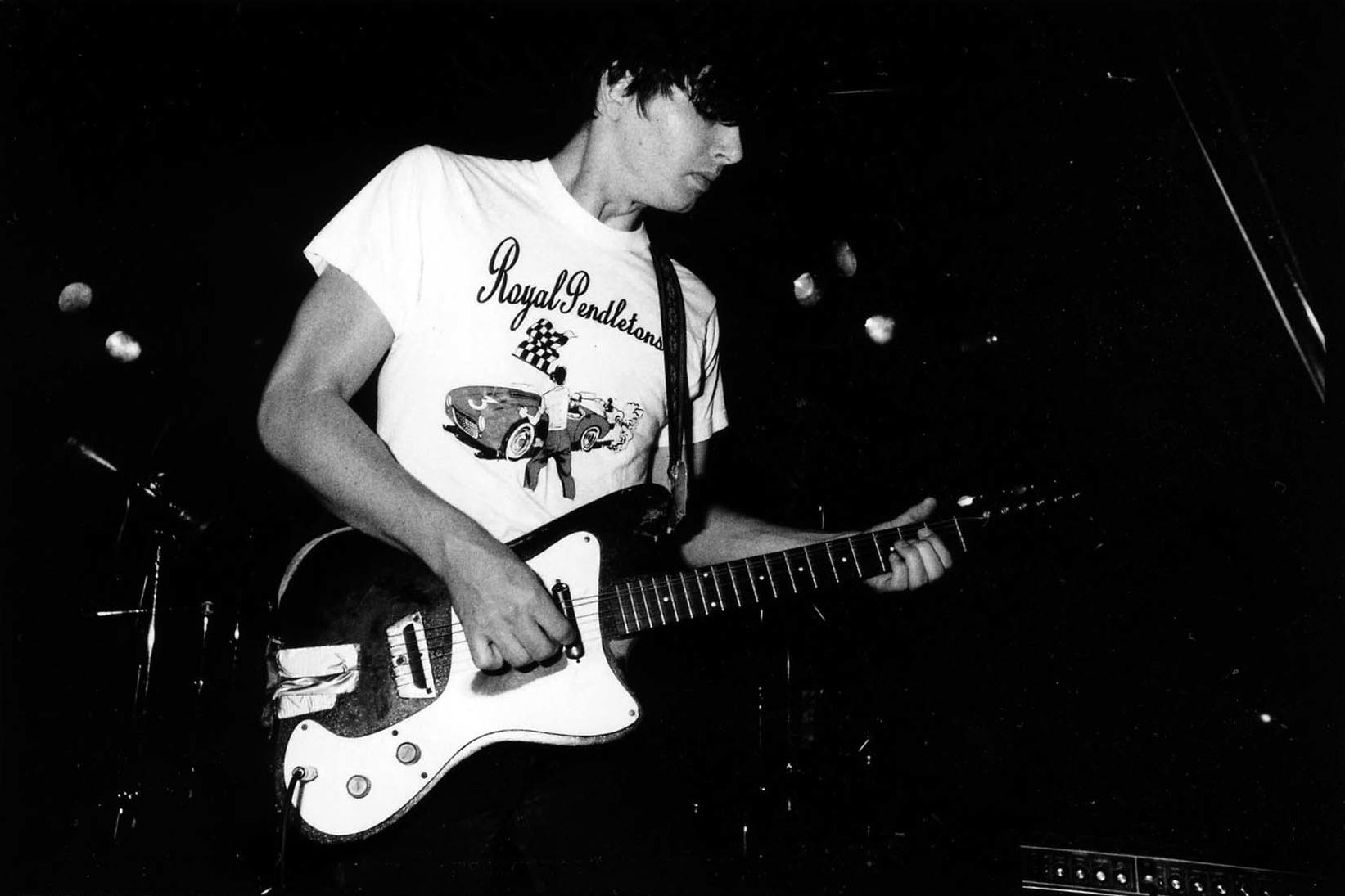
Eric Oblivian in Japan

As the band began to play more shows, Friedl began sending out the band's demo tapes, hoping to spur some label interest. One of the band's first big shows was as an opening act for the Jon Spencer Blues Explosion, a show that was arranged for them by a bookie at Maxwell's in New Jersey after having heard a copy of the band's "On the Go" demo which he had received from Friedl. For the show, the band flew to New York City, and while there the band received a fax from Crypt Records requesting a full-length album from the band and offering to set the band up with further tour dates in support of Crypt's stable of recording artists. With Crypt's support the band began touring overseas, though at home the band handled their own bookings. The band would go on to tour extensively in Europe, playing shows in Germany, the Netherlands, Spain, Italy, England, and Sweden, before continuing on through Asia, supporting Guitar Wolf in Japan.

=== Recordings ===
The band released their first LP, "Soul Food," in 1995. The album was recorded at Easley Studios in Memphis, Tennessee, and was released by Crypt Records. This was followed by a collaboration with fellow Memphis musicians Walter Daniels and Jeffery Evans on the "Walter Daniels Plays With Monsieur Jeffrey Evans & The Oblivians At Melissa's Garage" 10", released in 1995.

Between their first and second LPs the band released a compilation album called "Sympathy Sessions," which featured a collection of recordings the band had written and recorded in 1996 at Easley Studios for release on the independent record label Sympathy for the Record Industry. The album was a collection of two previously released 10" EP's, Never Enough and Six of the Best, as well as four additional tracks also recorded for the Sympathy label. This was followed by the band's second proper LP, "Popular Favorites," released in 1996, again on Crypt Records.

In 1997 the band teamed up with New Orleans one-man band and nightclub organist Mr. Quintron to record their third and final LP, the Gospel music-inspired ...Play 9 Songs with Mr Quintron. The Oblivians' final album was recorded in a single eight-hour session; Quintron traveled 16 hours roundtrip by bus from New Orleans to Memphis in order contribute a days worth of improvised percussion and organ accompaniments. A rough demo of the songs the band intended to record for the album failed to reach Mr. Quintron by mail, and so he was forced to begin arranging his contributions upon arrival, without prior knowledge of the content of the album. Cartwright credited the dramatic shift in styles between ...Play Nine Songs and the rest of the Oblivians' catalogue as one of the reasons for the eventual breakup of the band, noting that the group had begun to stray from a musical aesthetic that all its members could agree upon.

=== After the Oblivians ===
In 1998, after five years together, the Oblivians broke up and the bandmembers went their separate ways. After the Oblivians, Jack Yarber and Greg Cartwright reformed their old band, the Compulsive Gamblers. Yarber then went on to do some work with Impala and currently plays with his own band, Jack O and the Tennessee Tearjerkers. Yarber has been the most prolific former Oblivian, contributing to a number of bands, including: Tav Falco's Panther Burns, Knaughty Knights, South Filthy, The Cool Jerks, The Limes, The Brand New Love Affairs, King Louie & His Loose Diamonds, the Natural Kicks and Harlan T. Bobo.

Greg Cartwright went on to form his current band Reigning Sound, who have released a number of records on In the Red, Goner Records, Spoonful Records, Slovenly Recordings and Norton Records. He has also started producing albums for the likes of Mr. Airplane Man, The Goodnight Loving, Suttree, The Cuts, Porch Ghouls and The Deadly Snakes. Greg released one album, "Head Shop," with his wife, under the name Greg Oblivian and The Tip Tops. Cartwright periodically plays guitar on tour and some recordings with the Detroit soul-cover band The Detroit Cobras. Greg also started Legba Records, a Memphis record store which eventually came to house bandmate Eric Friedl's record label, Goner Records. Cartwright also went on to produce and write much of the material for the album "Dangerous Game" by Mary Weiss of the Shangri-Las which was released by Norton Records in March 2007. Cartwright performed one of his originals, "Stop and Think It Over" with Weiss on NBC's Late Night with Conan O'Brien.

After the Oblivians, Eric Friedl continued to run the independent record label, Goner Records, and recorded an album with Jay Reatard of The Reatards and King Louie Bankston of the Royal Pendletons called Bad Times. Friedl is currently a member of the Dutch Masters and The True Sons of Thunder.

In 2008, Greg Cartwright announced via the Goner Records message board, that the Gories and the Oblivians would play reunion shows in Detroit, Memphis, and Europe in 2009.

On February 21, 2012, many sources indicated that the Oblivians would be reconvening in order to record a new full-length on In the Red. This was confirmed by In The Red through their Twitter account.

On February 25, 2017 the Oblivians, the Craig Brown Band, Kelley Stoltz and the Mummies played a free concert to celebrate the opening of the pressing plant at the Third Man Records store in Detroit.

== Discography ==
Studio albums

- Soul Food LP/CD (Crypt, 1995, CR-055)
- Popular Favorites LP/CD (Crypt, 1996, CR-065)
- ...Play 9 Songs with Mr Quintron LP/CD (Crypt, 1997, CR-082)
- Desperation LP/CD (In The Red, 2013, ITR 238)

Other albums

- Rock'n Roll Holiday: Live In Atlanta LP (Negro Records, 1995, negro records 001, recorded on 08/19/94)
- The Sympathy Sessions CD (Sympathy For The Record Industry, 1996, SFTRI 406)
- 17 Cum Shots LP (Bootleg, 1997, cat.no.?)
- Best Of The Worst: 93-97 2xLP/CD (Sympathy For The Record Industry, 1999, SFTRI 584)
- Melissa's Garage Revisited LP/CD (Sympathy For The Record Industry, 1999, SFTRI 590)
- On The Go LP (Goner Records, 2003, 12Gone)
- Barristers 95 [Live] (In the Red, 2009, ITR 182)

Singles

- Call The Shots 7" (Goner Records, 1993, 2Gone)
- Sunday You Need Love 7" (Crypt, 1994, CR-044)
- Now For The Hard Of Hearing From ... "Blow Their Cool" 7" (Estrus, 1994, ES 756)
- Static Party 7" (In The Red, 1994, ITR 018)
- Go!Pill-Popper! 7" (Drug Racer, 1996, 001)
- Strong Come On 7" (Crypt, 1996, CR-053)
- Kick Your Ass 7" (Sympathy For The Record Industry, 1996, SFTRI 412)

EP's

- Never Enough 10" (Sympathy For The Record Industry, 1994, SFTRI 304)
- Six Of The Best 10" (Sympathy For The Record Industry, 1995, SFTRI 383)
- Walter Daniels Plays With Monsieur Jeffrey Evans & The Oblivians At Melissa's Garage 10" (Undone, 1995, UDR-0008-10)

Splits

- Split CS with Impala (Goner Records/Power Of Bob, 1993, 0Gone/POB 103)
- Split 7" with Two Bo's Maniacs (Hate Records, 1997, hate 7)
- Split 7" with the Crime Kaisers (Active Detective, 1998, active detective record No. 1)
