= Best of the Worst: 93–97 =

Compilation album by Oblivians
- Released: September 28, 1999
- Recorded: 1994 – February 15, 1997
- Genre: Garage rock
- Label: Sympathy for the Record Industry

Oblivians chronology
...Play 9 Songs with Mr Quintron (1997)	Best of the Worst: 93–97 (1999)	Melissa's Garage Revisited (1999)

Professional ratings
Review scores
Source	Rating
Allmusic	link

Best of the Worst: 93–97 is a two LP/CD compilation album by the Memphis garage-rock band, the Oblivians. It was released on September 28, 1999, by Sympathy for the Record Industry. The album features career-spanning and previously unreleased rarities, B-sides, and live cuts by the Oblivians. The liner notes, chronicling the band's roots, formation, and various anecdotes, were written by '68 Comeback founder, Jeffrey Evans.

== Track listing ==
1. "Siamese Purse" (Memphis Studio, 1995) - 2:24
2. "Alcoholic" (Home Studio, 1994) - 1:52
3. "Indian in Me" (Memphis Studio, 1995) - 3:07
4. "Tear Drop for You" (Home Studio, 1994) - 2:57
5. "Bald Headed Woman" (Memphis Studio, 1995) - 1:55
6. "Peepin' & Hidin'" (Live On WMFU, 1997) - 3:08
7. "Don't Haunt Me" (Easley Studio, 1995) - 3:11
8. "I Got Something to Say" (Easley Studio, 1995) - 1:27
9. "Lady, Oh Lady" (Live On WMFU, 1997) - 2:24
10. "Roadrunner" (Live On WMFU, 1997) - 3:03
11. "Hey Ma, Look at Sis" (Live On WMFU, 1997) - 2:14
12. "Talk To Me" (Joe Seneca Cover) (Easley Studio, 1995) - 3:20
13. "Robot Blues" (Easley Studio, 1995) - 2:24
14. "Locomotion" (Live In Hambug, 1995) - 2:11
15. "Oh, How To Do" (Monks Cover) (Live In Oxford, Ms 1995) - 2:39
16. "Shut My Mouth" (Live In Hamburg, 1995) - 2:08
17. "Losing Hand" (Royal Pendletons Cover) (Live In Hamburg, 1995) - 2:34
18. "Pill Popper Part I & II" (Live On WMFU, 1997) - 4:04
19. "Live the Life" (Live On WMFU, 1997) - 3:54
20. "Alone Again Or" (Love Cover) (Live On WEVL, 1993) - 3:21
21. "Kick Your Ass" (Live In Oxford, Ms 1995) - 1:37
22. "Mad Lover" (Live In Hamburg, 1995) - 1:37
23. "Blew My Cool" (Live On WMFU, 1997) - 1:54
24. "Never Change" (Live In Hamburg, 1995) - 3:29
25. "Everybody But Me" (Easley Studio, 1995) - 1:45
