= Soul Food (Oblivians album) =

Studio album by Oblivians
- Released: 1995
- Recorded: Easley
- Genre: Garage punk
- Length: 32:20
- Label: Crypt

Oblivians chronology
| Soul Food (1995) | Rock'n Roll Holiday: Live in Atlanta (1995) |

Soul Food is the Oblivians' first album. It was recorded at Easley Studios in Memphis, Tennessee, and released in 1995 by Crypt Records.

== Critical reception ==
Professional ratings
Review scores
| Source | Rating |
|---|---|
| AllMusic | 3/5 stars |

Trouser Press noted that "the ear-bleeding opener, a rendition of Lightnin' Hopkins' 'Viet Nam War Blues', sounds like the second Velvets effort if Lou Reed had studied under Hasil Adkins instead of Delmore Schwartz." Joe Warminsky, of The Morning Call, listed Soul Food as the third best album of 1995.

== Track listing ==
1. "Viet Nam War Blues" (Hopkins) - 2:37
2. "And Then I Fucked Her" (Oblivians) - 1:20
3. "Big Black Hole" (Oblivians) - 2:53
4. "Jim Cole" (Oblivians) - 1:01
5. "Mad Lover" (Oblivians) - 1:50
6. "Sunday You Need Love" (Remmler/Gralle) - 2:53
7. "Never Change" (Oblivians) - 2:37
8. "No Reason to Live" (Oblivians) - 1:23
9. "I'm Not a Sicko, There's a Plate in My Head" (Oblivians) - 2:06
10. "Blew My Cool" (Oblivians) - 1:55
11. "Cannonball" (Oblivians) - 1:49
12. "Nigger Rich" (Oblivian/Peebles) - 1:21
13. "Bum a Ride" (Oblivians) - 2:32
14. "Any Way You Want It" (Clark) - 1:36
15. "Static Party" (Oblivians) - 1:39
16. "Ja Ja Ja" (Remmler/Gralle) - 2:50

== Personnel ==
- Eric Oblivian – Guitar, drums, vocals
- Greg Oblivian – Guitar, drums, vocals
- Jack Oblivian – Guitar, drums, vocals
