= Distortions (album) =

Studio album by The Litter
- Released: May 1, 1967
- Recorded: 1966
- Studio: Dove Studios, Minneapolis, Minnesota
- Genre: Garage rock
- Length: 34:10
- Label: Sundazed Music
- Producer: Warren Kendrick

The Litter chronology
| Distortions (1967) | $100 Fine (1968) |

Singles from Distortions
- 1. "Action Woman" Released: January 1967; 2. "Somebody Help Me" Released: 1967

Distortions is the debut studio album by American psychedelic and garage rock band the Litter. It was released on May 1, 1967, by Warick Records and includes the single "Action Woman".

== Background ==
The Litter formed in 1966 from the remains of two locally popular Minneapolis groups, the Victors and the Tabs. Early into the group's existence, the Litter enjoyed tremendous popularity, particularly in Chicago where the band became regulars at the Electric Theatre as they performed alongside the Byrds and Jethro Tull, among others. During this time, bass guitarist and keyboardist Jim Kane got the Litter in contact with record producer Warren Kendrick, who was a capable instrumentalist in his own right before an arm injury prevented him from performing. Seeing the group's potential, Kendrick signed the Litter to a recording contract to his self-owned record label, Scotty Records, to produce their debut single and subsequent album.

"Action Woman", a Kendrick-penned composition about a man in search of a "woman who'll satisfy his soul", was chosen for the group's first release. Musically exhibiting heavy influence from the British Invasion bands the Yardbirds and the Who, "Action Woman" was marked by distorted guitar riffs and feedback provided by lead guitarist Bill Strandlof. The fuzz-toned instrumentals evident in the song were regularly utilized in the Litter's later recordings, even prompting Kendrick to name their first album Distortions. In addition to Strandlof's motif, the composition was also highlighted by Denny Waite's authoritative and snarling lead vocals, coupled with a raw musical stance emulating from the band's relatively live-recording style.

In January 1967, "Action Woman", with a cover version of Pete Townshend's "A Legal Matter" as its B-side, was released and became a regional hit in Minneapolis. The song received a broader audience when it was featured as the opening track to the highly regarded compilation album, Pebbles, Volume 1 in 1979. Music historian Richie Unterberger praised "Action Woman", saying it is "an archetype of the tough '60s garage rock favored by fans of the Pebbles reissue series". Along with its inclusion on Pebbles the composition also appears on the 1998 reissue of Nuggets: Original Artyfacts from the First Psychedelic Era, 1965–1968 and Trash Box.

The song has been covered by multiple groups, the first of which came just a month after the Litter's version by fellow-Minnesota band the Electras. The Electras' rendition, along with sharing Kendrick as their producer, has caused many record collectors to wrongly believe the two groups contained some of the same members. Other versions were recorded by Naz Nomad and the Nightmares during the garage rock revival of the 1980s, Kek '66, and Echo & the Bunnymen.

== Track listing ==
Side one
| No. | Title | Writer(s) | Length |
|---|---|---|---|
| 1. | "Action Woman" | Warren Kendrick | 2:34 |
| 2. | "Whatcha Gonna Do About It" | Ian Samwell; Brian Potter | 2:28 |
| 3. | "Codine" | Buffy Sainte-Marie | 4:32 |
| 4. | "Somebody Help Me" | Jackie Edwards | 1:57 |
| 5. | "Substitute" | Pete Townshend | 4:28 |
| Total length: | | | 15:59 |

Side two
| No. | Title | Writer(s) | Length |
|---|---|---|---|
| 1. | "I'm So Glad" | Skip James | 3:50 |
| 2. | "A Legal Matter" | Townshend | 2:49 |
| 3. | "Rack My Mind" | Chris Dreja; Jim McCarty; Jeff Beck; Keith Relf; Paul Samwell-Smith | 4:44 |
| 4. | "Soul Searchin'" | Kendrick | 2:49 |
| 5. | "I'm a Man" | Bo Diddley | 3:59 |
| Total length: | | | 18:11 |

== Personnel ==
- Denny Waite — lead vocals, keyboards, harmonica
- Tom "Zippy" Caplan – lead guitar, backing vocals, special effects
- Dan Rinaldi — rhythm guitar, backing vocals, special effects
- Jim Kane – bass, backing vocals, organ, special effects
- Tom Murray — drums, percussion
