= Teenage Hate =

Studio album by the Reatards
- Released: 1998
- Genres: Garage punk; garage rock; punk rock
- Length: 36:47
- Label: Goner

The Reatards chronology
Teenage Hate (1998)	Grown Up, Fucked Up (1999)

Professional ratings
Review scores
Source	Rating
AllMusic	4/5 stars
The A.V. Club	B
Consequence of Sound	4/5 stars
Pitchfork	8.6/10
Spin	7/10

Teenage Hate is the debut studio album by the American garage punk band, the Reatards. It was released in 1998 via Goner Records. It features raw punk rock with elements from various music genres such as garage rock, blues, power pop, and rockabilly. The album utilizes a raw lo-fi sound, which makes it sound like "it was recorded on a telephone", juxtaposing hooks and choruses with highly dissonant guitars and screaming, which were compared to those of Black Francis of Pixies.

Goner reissued Teenage Hate on May 17, 2011, a year after Jay Reatard's death. The posthumous release included two rare recordings, The Reatards Cassette and Fuck Elvis Here's the Reatards Cassette, which have been previously released on only cassette format. These were included in the bonus disc. The reissue, which includes covers of artists such as the Beatles, Buddy Holly, Fear, Lil' Bunnies, the Litter, and Dead Boys, received critical acclaim.

== Track listing ==
All tracks are written by the Reatards, except where noted.

No.	Title	Writer(s)	Length
1.	"I'm So Gone"		1:26
2.	"Stacye"		1:25
3.	"I Love Living" (Fear cover)	Lee Ving	1:37
4.	"When I Get Mad"		2:51
5.	"C'mon Over"		1:59
6.	"Out of My Head into My Bed"		1:38
7.	"You Fucked Up My Dreams"		2:46
8.	"It Ain't Me"		2:15
9.	"Down in Flames" (The Dead Boys cover)		2:19
10.	"Gotta Rock'n'Roll"		1:16
11.	"Memphis Blues"		2:28
12.	"Quite All Right"		2:27
13.	"Fashion Victim"		1:41
14.	"Old News Baby"		1:44
15.	"Not Good Enough for You"		1:40
16.	"Ollie Vee" (Buddy Holly cover)		2:33
17.	"Not Your Man"		1:36
18.	"I Can Live Without You"		3:06
Total length:			36:47

The Reatards Cassette
No.	Title	Length
1.	"Black September" (Johnny Vomit & the Dry Heaves cover)	1:34
2.	"Chuck Taylors All Stars Blues"	1:35
3.	"I Lie To"	0:43
4.	"Memphis Blues"	2:46
5.	"On the Go"	1:39
6.	"Give It to Me"	2:21
7.	"Carot Belly Bunny Blues" (Lil' Bunnies cover)	0:54
8.	"You Build Me Up Just to Bust Me Back Down"	1:26
9.	"Your the One"	2:11
10.	"When I Get Mad"	2:39
11.	"Get the Fuck Out of My House"	1:43
Total length:		19:31

Fuck Elvis Here's the Reatards Cassette
No.	Title	Length
1.	"You Build Me Up Just to Bust Me Back Down"	1:33
2.	"You Ain't No Fun No Mo"	1:31
3.	"I Lie Too"	0:39
4.	"Give It to Me"	1:58
5.	"C'Mon Over"	1:56
6.	"Not Your Man"	1:43
7.	"Your Old News Baby"	1:52
8.	"Crazy Man"	2:27
9.	"Action Woman" (The Litter cover)	2:02
10.	"I'm Down" (The Beatles cover)	1:54
Total length:		17:35

== Personnel ==
- Elvis Wong Reatard – drums
- Steve Albundy Reatard – guitar, backing vocals
- Jay Reatard – guitar, vocals
- Doug Easley – mastering
- Jason Ward – mastering
