= Shuttle bus =

Mode of transport

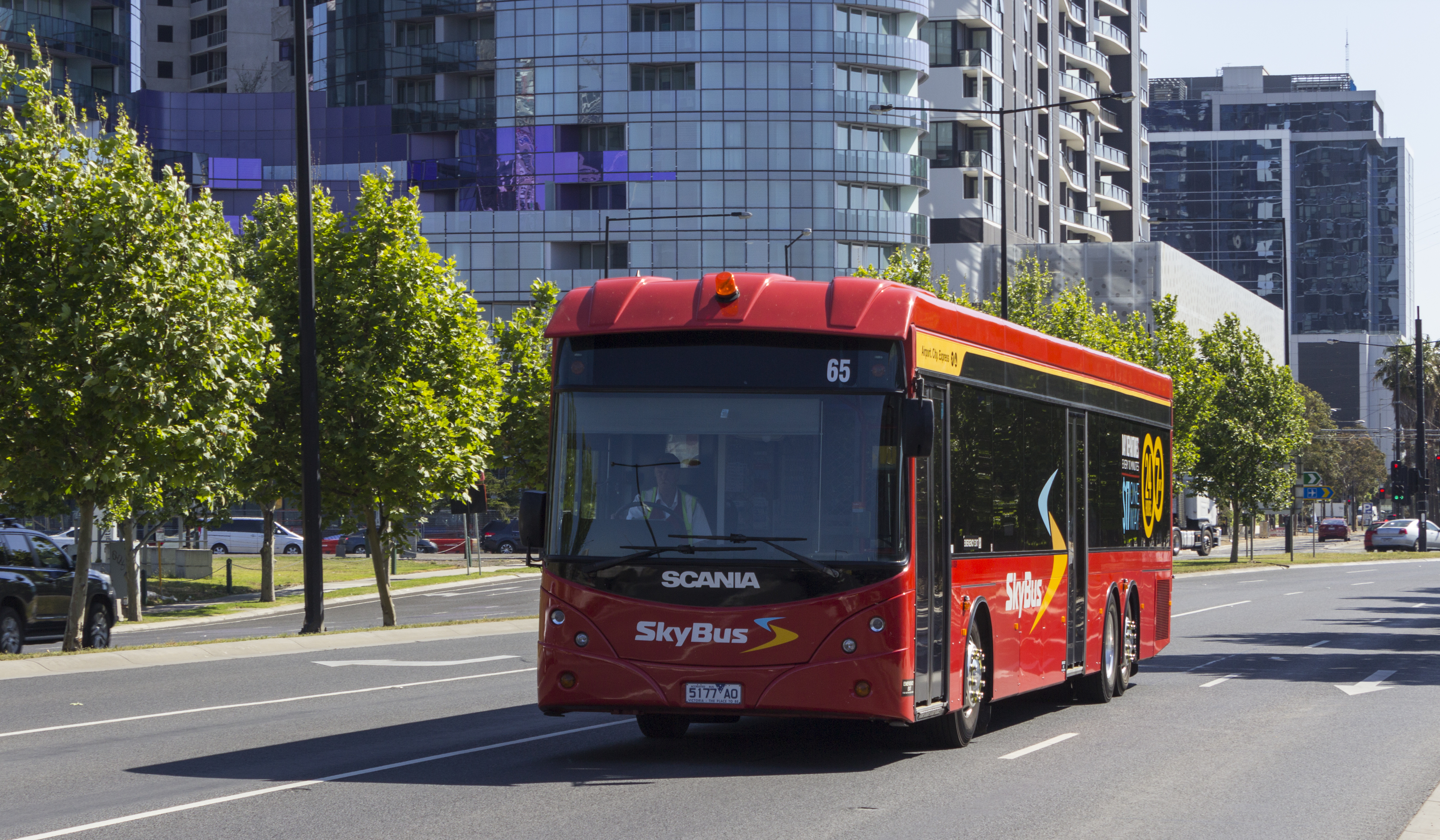
SkyBus service operating in Central Melbourne.

A shuttle bus is a large passenger motor vehicle that travels a shorter route in comparison to most bus routes. Typically, shuttle buses travel in both directions between two points or travel in a loop. Shuttle buses are designed to transport large groups of people who are all travelling to and from a specific destination in a more organised manner. These services may be offered for a fee by businesses, as a free service for certain categories of people (e.g., employees or customers of a certain business), or as a government public transportation system. Shuttle buses can be used for several applications, such as transporting university students or transporting people from airports to hotels.

== Types ==
=== Airport and hotel busses ===
A hotel shuttle for Lihpao Resort

Airport buses, also known as airport shuttles, and airport shuttle buses, are buses that take passengers to and from an airport, usually connecting to a city centre. These buses mainly travel to major transit hubs; however, they may also travel directly to major hotels around the city. Buses that travel directly between an airport and a hotel are often called hotel shuttles.

=== University shuttles ===
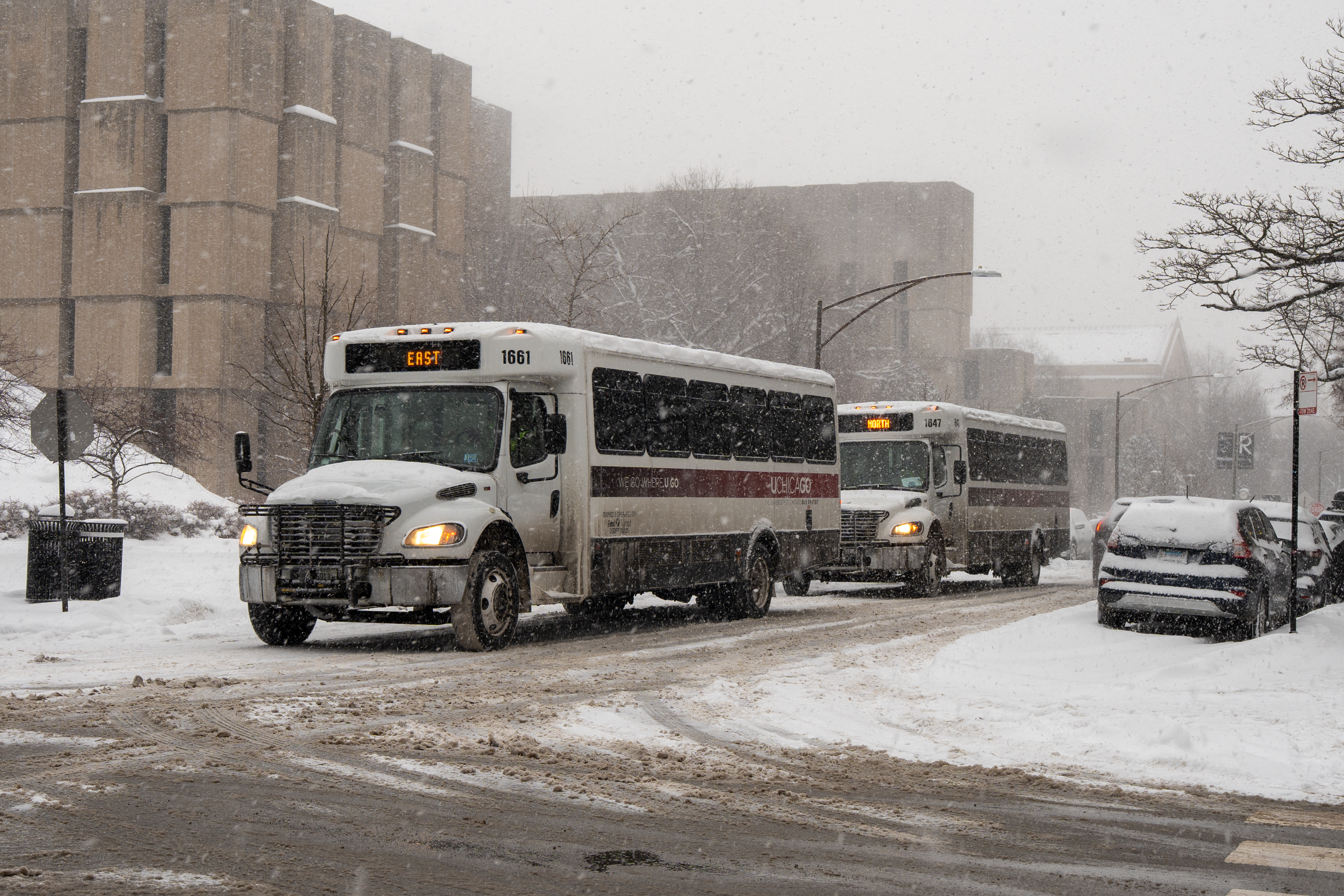
UChicago UGo shuttle busses

University shuttles are buses that travel within a university campus area, between a main campus and satellite campuses, or to connect with major transport hubs and railway stations. University shuttles operate within larger campuses that may not allow public road access. These shuttles cut down transportation times between two ends of the campus and allow students to travel safely during the night through dark places. University shuttles also tend to operate before or after regular operational hours for regular bus services.

=== Rail replacement buses ===
Rail replacement buses are buses that operate when a particular train line is not operating. These services are run by the railway company and often serve a number of stations along the railway line.

=== Employee shuttles ===
Employee shuttles are buses used to transport employees between their homes and workplaces. These shuttles may also be used to transport people within workplaces. These employee shuttles provide benefits such as easing the daily commutes of workers. During the end of COVID-19, many people were accustomed to working at home, as a result many companies began to use employee shuttles as a tool to bring people back into the workplace.

=== Casino shuttles ===
A stop for a casino shuttle.

Casino shuttles are private bus services which transport patrons to casinos or related gaming or racetrack facilities.

=== Community transport ===
Community transport (British English) or paratransit (North American English) are shuttle buses designed to transport those with disabilities and other people who are struggling to get around. Community transit is often designed to be accessible for those in wheelchairs by offering additional features that may not always be present on regular buses. These extra features include special equipment, ramps, and additional wheelchair areas.

=== Door-to-Gate and Door-to-Door shuttles ===
Door-to-Gate and Door-to-Door shuttle services provide flexible airport transfers by collecting passengers directly from private residences, hotels, or other designated addresses and transporting them to airport terminals. This model differs from standard airport shuttles, which typically operate fixed routes between transit hubs and airports.

In Europe, services like Shuttle Direct and Ziptransfers operate similar pre-booked door-to-door transfer services, targeting both airport routes and tourist destinations. These platforms partner with local transport providers to offer flexible private or shared rides.

These services are useful in regions with limited public transport access to the airport and are often recommended by airports themselves or integrated into their mobility platforms.

== Global use ==
=== Australia ===
Shuttle buses in Australia are used to connect airports to city centres: for instance Melbourne's Skybus connects Melbourne Airport to Southern Cross Station in Melbourne's central business district. The Kinetic Group subsidiary operates airport shuttles in several other cities across Australia, such as Hobart. Shuttle buses are also used to transport students from transport hubs (such as train stations or bus stations) to their universities.

=== Belgium ===
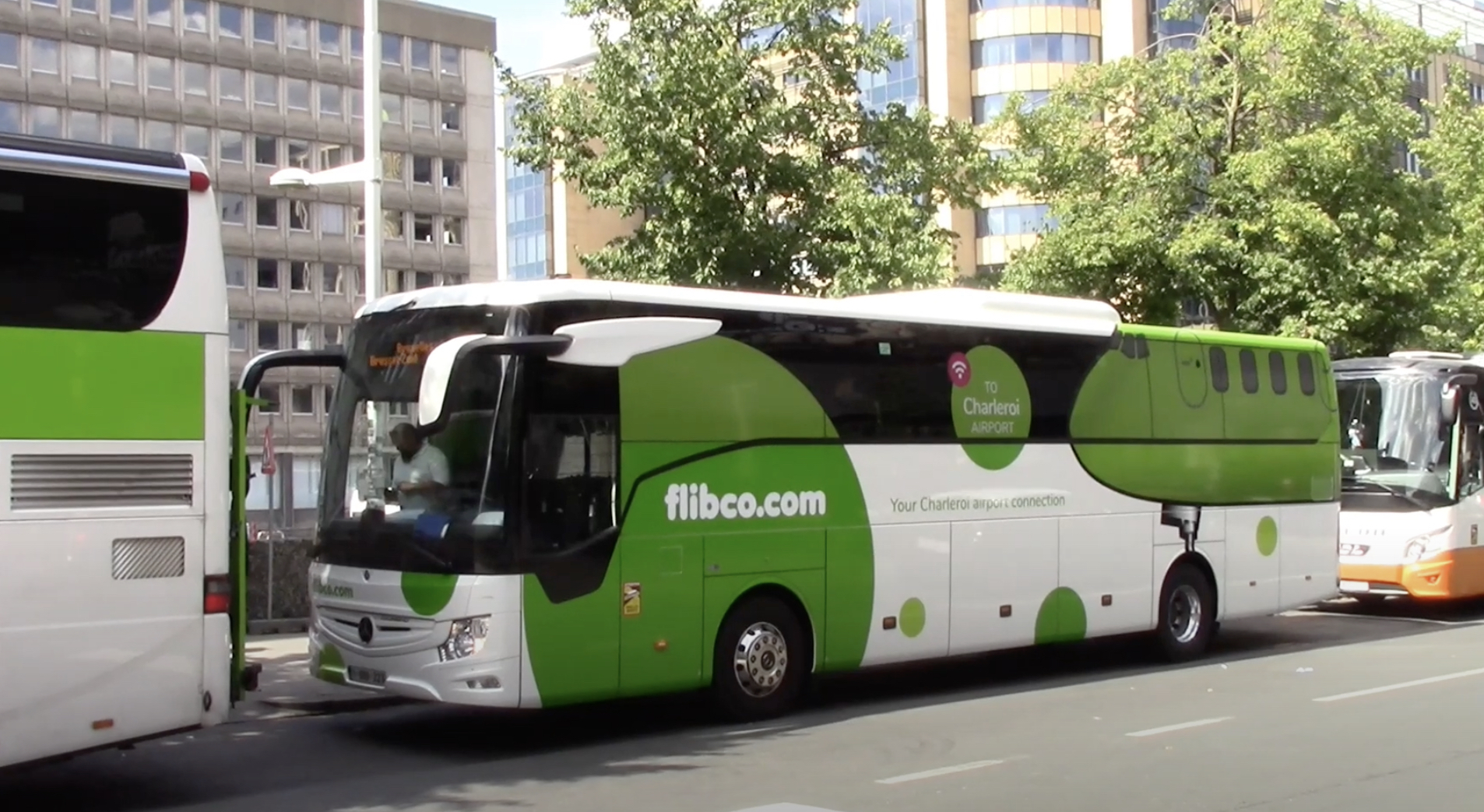
Flibco Shuttle buses in Europe

At Brussels Airport, long-distance coach services operate directly from the terminal forecourt, including shuttle lines to and from the Netherlands and Luxembourg.

=== Italy ===
At Milan Bergamo Airport, official airport buses connect passengers with Milan Centrale station and surrounding cities, with shuttle operators departing from the arrivals level.

=== Ukraine ===
In Kyiv, Ukraine, there is a short, temporary shuttle bus route connecting the Lybidska station and the Demiivska station to the Teremky station. The bus was launched due to the flood between the stations. As of 2022, commercial air traffic in Ukraine has been suspended due to martial law and ongoing military conflict. Consequently, services that typically connect airports with city centres, including shuttle bus operations, have been discontinued or significantly reduced.

=== United Kingdom ===
In the UK, shuttle buses operate at airports as well as serving as a connection between universities and local areas. One example of this is the Hotel Hoppa service that travels from Heathrow Airport to several nearby hotels. In the UK, there are also many shuttle buses that serve the city centre and their nearby area campuses. For example, Oxford Bus Company operates the science transit shuttle: there are two routes which connect the city centre and the railway station with various destinations used by science students.

=== United States ===
In the US, shuttle buses transport users from airports and city centres. One of the most used of these is the FlyAway bus service in Los Angeles connecting Union Station and Los Angeles International Airport.
