= The Reatards =

American band

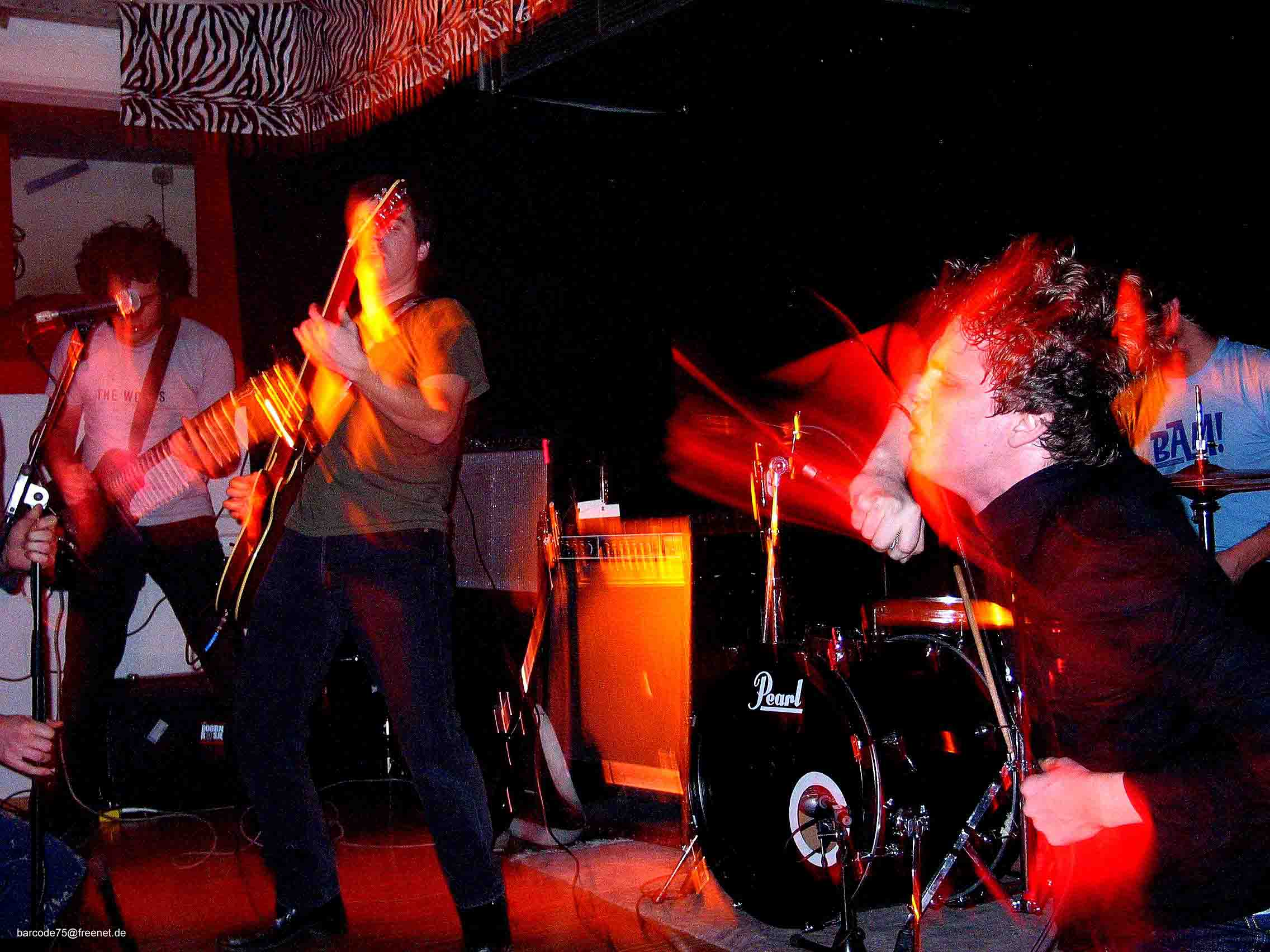

Background information
- Origin: Memphis, Tennessee, United States
- Genres: Garage punk; punk rock; lo-fi
- Years active: 1995–1999, 2005–2006
- Labels: Goner; Empty
- Past members: Jay Reatard; Sean "Albundy" Redd; Ryan "Wong" Rousseau; Rich Crook

The Reatards were an American garage punk band formed in Memphis, Tennessee, in 1995. Originally a one-man project by guitarist Jay Reatard, the group's sound was marked by raw, stripped-down instrumentals and lo-fi recording quality. After distributing privately pressed cassettes and EPs, most notably Fuck Elvis, Here's the Reatards, the band released their debut album Teenage Hate in 1998, followed by Grown Up, Fucked Up a year later. By 1999, the group only sporadically performed as Reatard began exploring other endeavors, but in 2005 he reformed the band for their third and final studio album. Much of the Reatards' discography remains a subject of interest, leading to reissues of their work years later.

== History ==
Credited with directly inspiring his sojourn into music, the garage punk band the Oblivians' crude style motivated Jay Reatard to form his own one-man band, the Reatards, to record homemade demo tapes highly influenced by the Oblivians' distorted, lo-fi garage sound. His earliest recordings, completed when Reatard was 15 years old, are extremely primitive; they were all completed on a four-track tape with Reatard providing vocals, guitar, and "drumming" on a bucket. Reatard was so enamored with the Oblivians' music, he sent their guitarist Eric Friedl some of his home recordings, impressing Friedl enough to arrange a record deal on his independent label, Goner Records. In 1997, Goner distributed the Reatards' debut EP, titled Get Real Stupid, which featured four brief tracks with a running time under seven minutes.

Another Oblivians member, drummer Greg Cartwright, was impressed by Reatard's recordings and joined him for his second EP, Fuck Elvis, Here's the Reatards. By 1998, the Reatards evolved into a more proper band with the inclusion of guitarist Steve Albundy "Reatard" and drummer Ryan Elvis "Wong Reatard". The trio recorded and released their first studio album Teenage Hate, an assortment of gritty and manic punk fare, in the same year. Music critic Mark Deming described the album's sound as "teenage angst at its harshest", as well as "simple, but they're memorable, with actual hooks and bellow-along choruses to go with the heavyweight crash of the guitars, drums, and feral vocals". Along with band originals, Teenage Hate includes cover versions of Fear, the Dead Boys, and Buddy Holly.

The Reatards released two more EPs in 1998 and 1999, Get Out of Our Way and Your So Lewd, before distributing the band's second studio album Grown Up, Fucked Up on Empty Records, in November 1999. The album was as primitive, albeit more structurally sound, as Teenage Hate but came at a time that the group was competing for time with Reatard's other side projects, most notably the Lost Sounds. Deming notes Grown Up, Fucked Up as a transitional album where "one can hear faint clues of the somewhat more sophisticated music he would later make with Lost Sounds and as a solo artist". In the same year, before committing fully to other bands, the Reatards toured the West coast and Europe.

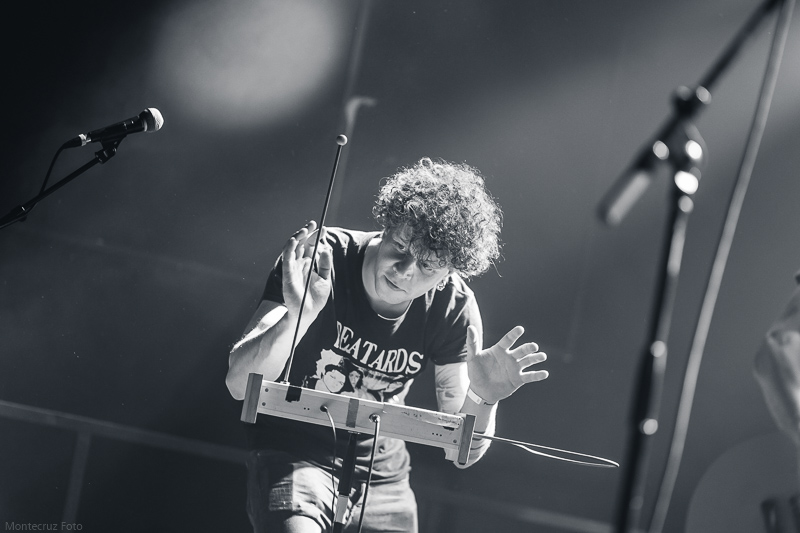
Reatards band shirt worn by a member of German punk band Pisse in 2018

When the Lost Sounds disbanded in 2005, Reatard reformed the Reatards to play live shows, and release the group's third and final studio album, Not Fucked Enough, on Empty Records. However, the Reatards broke up for the last time a year later as Reatard embarked on a solo career. When Reatard unexpectedly died in 2010 at age 29, much of his work was reissued systematically after his death, including his recordings with the Reatards. In 2011, a deluxe version of Teenage Hate was released on CD with Fuck Elvis, Here's the Reatards. Reflecting on Teenage Hate and Reatard's most recent albums, David Bevan of Pitchfork said "All the energy one could hear in Reatard's better-known work is here in its rawest, most volatile form". The group's second album, Grown Up, Fucked Up, was also redistributed in 2015.

== Band members ==
- Jay Reatard – Lead vocals, guitar, drums (1995-99, 2004-06, 2009)
- Greg Cartwright (Greg Oblivian) – drums (1996-97)
- Scott Bomar – bass (1997)
- Jeff Goggins – drums (1997)
- Ryan Rousseau (Elvis Wong Reatard) – drums, vocals (1997-98, 1999, 2004, 2005-06, 2009)
- Sean Redd (Steve Albundy Reatard) – guitar, vocals (1998-99, 2004, 2009)
- Jack Yarber (Jack Oblivian) – drums (1998)
- Jason Sickle (Jason Eunuch) – drums (1998)
- Rich Crook – guitar, bass, drums (1998-99, 2004)
- Charlie Gerber – bass (1998)
- Pete Jay – guitar (1999)
- King Louie Bankston (Mr. X) – drums (1999)
- James Arthur – guitar (1999)
- Steve Sleaze – guitar (2005-06)
- Daniel Conroy – bass (2005-06)

== Discography ==
=== Albums ===
- Teenage Hate (1998)
- Grown Up, Fucked Up (1999)
- Not Fucked Enough (2005)

=== Live albums ===
- Live (2004)

=== Compilation albums ===
- Bed Room Disasters (2004)

=== EPs ===
- Get Out of Our Way (1998)
- Untitled (2002)
- Plastic Surgery (2005)
- Monster Child (2005)

=== Singles ===
- "Get Real Stupid" [four songs] – Goner Records (8GONE), 1997
- "You're So Lewd" [three songs] – Empty Records (MTR-378), 1999
- "Totally Shattered" [three songs] – Ken Rock (KEN 45), 2005
- "I Lie Too" [three songs] – Zaxxon Records (ZR-003), 2006
