= White Bus =

White Bus can refer to

- White Buses, a Swedish humanitarian operation to free Scandinavians in German concentration camps in World War II
- The White Bus, a 1967 British short drama film directed by Lindsay Anderson
- White Bus Services, bus operator based in Berkshire, England
- White Motor Company, an American manufacturer of motor vehicles

== See also ==
- Wrightbus
- Wightbus
