= Diamond South East =

English bus operator

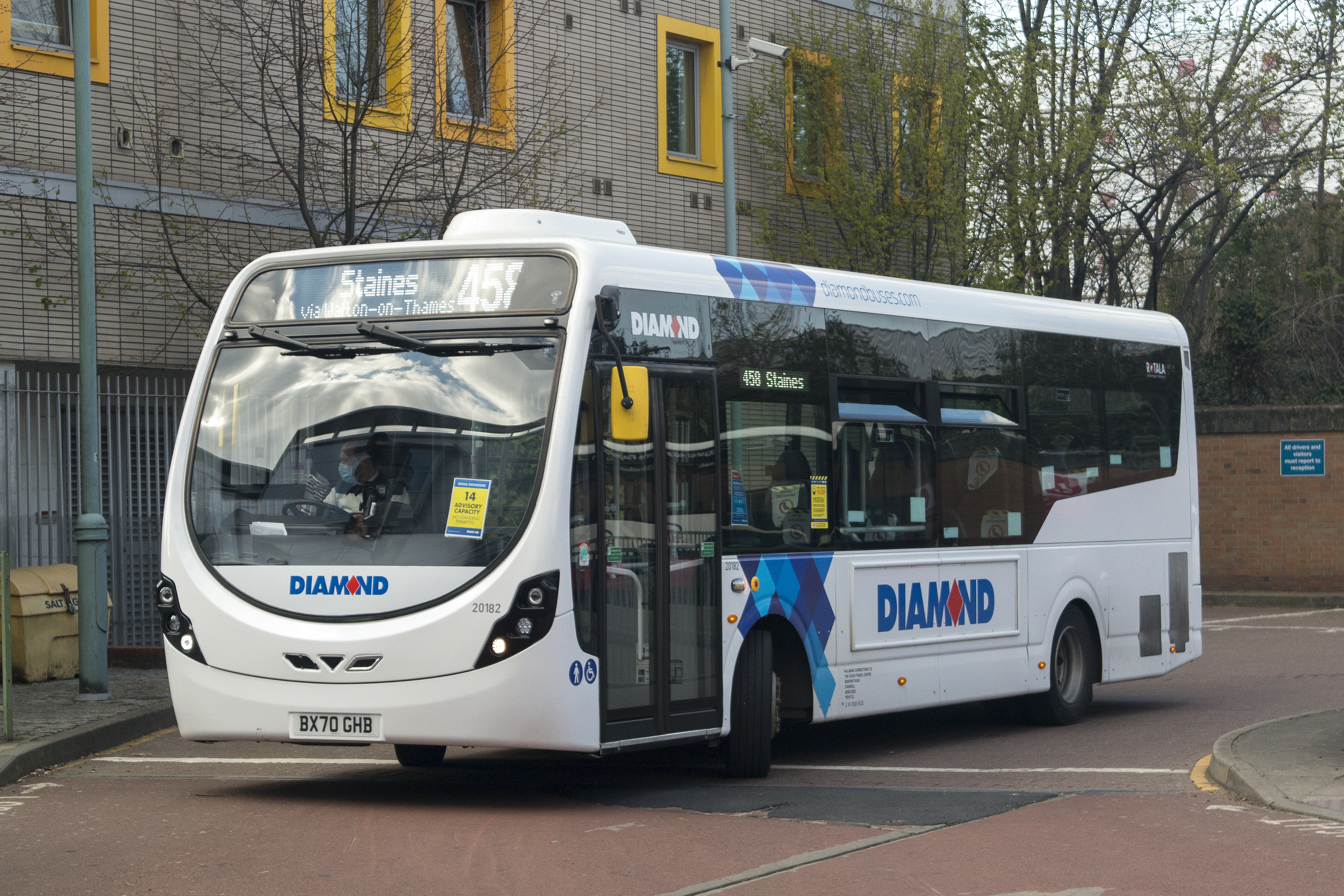
- A Wright StreetLite on route 458 in Kingston
- Parent: Rotala
- Founded: 1913
- Headquarters: Stanwell
- Service area: Greater London, South East England
- Service type: Local bus services Coach services (Hallmark)
- Website: Diamond South East

Hallmark Connections Limited, trading as Diamond South East, is a bus operator in South East England and, through the Hotel Hoppa operation, in Greater London. It is a subsidiary of Rotala.

In addition to local bus services, Diamond South East operates the Hallmark luxury coach and corporate cars business, which was originally founded in 1913 as an independent company known as Flights Hallmark.

== History ==
Flights Hallmark was established in 1913 in Birmingham. Over the years it has developed in the coach industry, and as at March 2008 operated over 172 buses and coaches and 51 cars. The company was purchased by Rotala in August 2005.

== Rotala ==
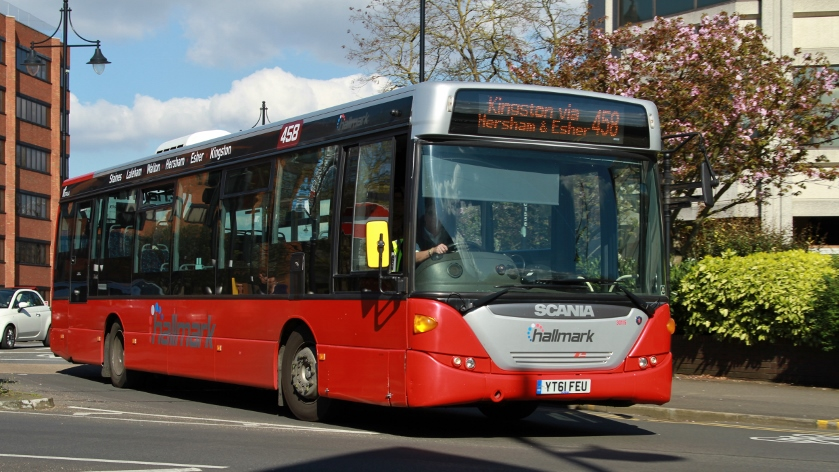
A Scania K230UB bus in Surrey in 2017

Flights Hallmark bought the Surrey Connect business, which became part of Rotala shortly afterwards. It sold Surrey Connect to Wiltax in June 2007. Hallmark operates bus route 458 in Surrey, which links Kingston-upon-Thames and Staines-upon-Thames.

Hallmark logo

Flights Hallmark was rebranded to Hallmark under Rotala ownership. When Rotala subsequently launched local bus services out of the Hallmark depots, these services were branded as Hallmark Connections. In 2021, Hallmark Connections was rebranded as Diamond South East; the Hallmark brand was retained for coach services.

== Current operations ==
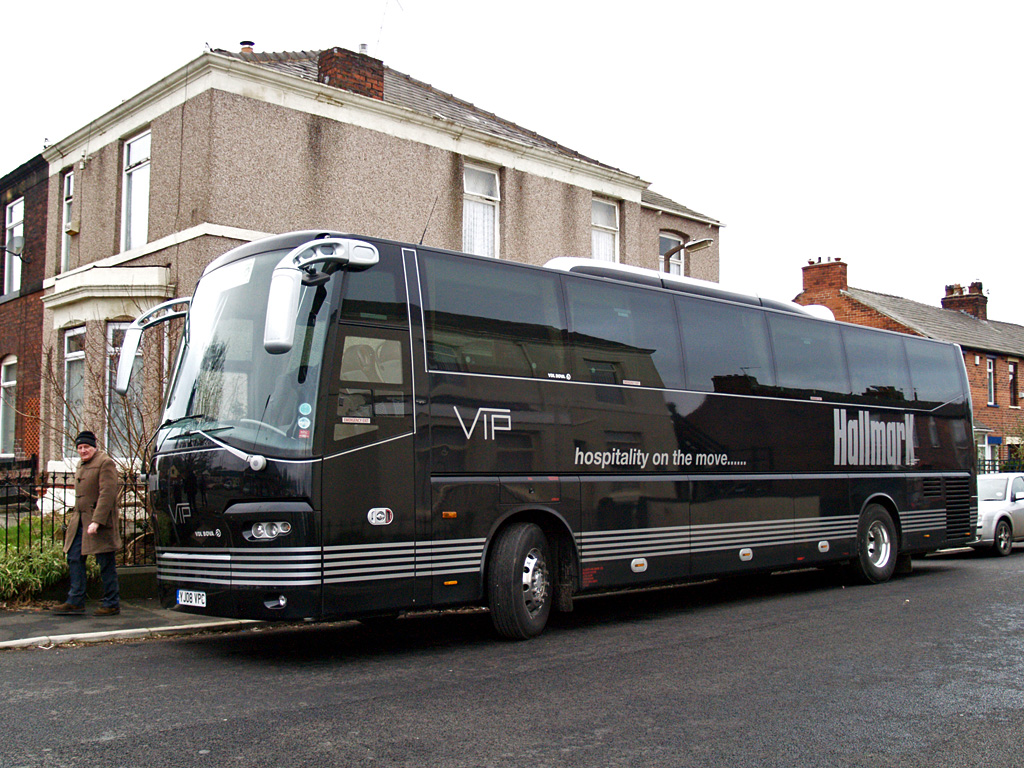
A Bova-bodied coach in 2009

Diamond South East operates 16 routes serving Heathrow Airport, and 8 bus routes in Surrey and South West London, 4 of which primarily serve schools and the Royal Holloway University and another one which serves Whitley Village.

Since 6 July 2020, Diamond South East had operated route 250 between Oxford and Bicester via Hampton Poyle, Bletchingdon, Kirtlington, Lower Heyford, Upper Heyford and Middleton Stoney. They won the route from Oxford Bus Company in a recent tender renewal for Oxfordshire County Council contracts This service ceased running on 11 February 2023 and will be partly replaced by service 24 operated by Grayline.

Hallmark currently runs buses and coaches from a number of depots in various parts of England. These services include shuttle bus services, airline or crew transfers, private hires, tours, and VIP services such as providing coaches for football teams. Clients include: Aston Villa, Burton Albion, Ipswich, Nottingham Forest, Walsall and West Bromwich football clubs Worcester Warriors rugby club.

The chauffeur driven cars division of the business is Flights Corporate Transfers. This is usually airport transfer work.

== Former operations ==
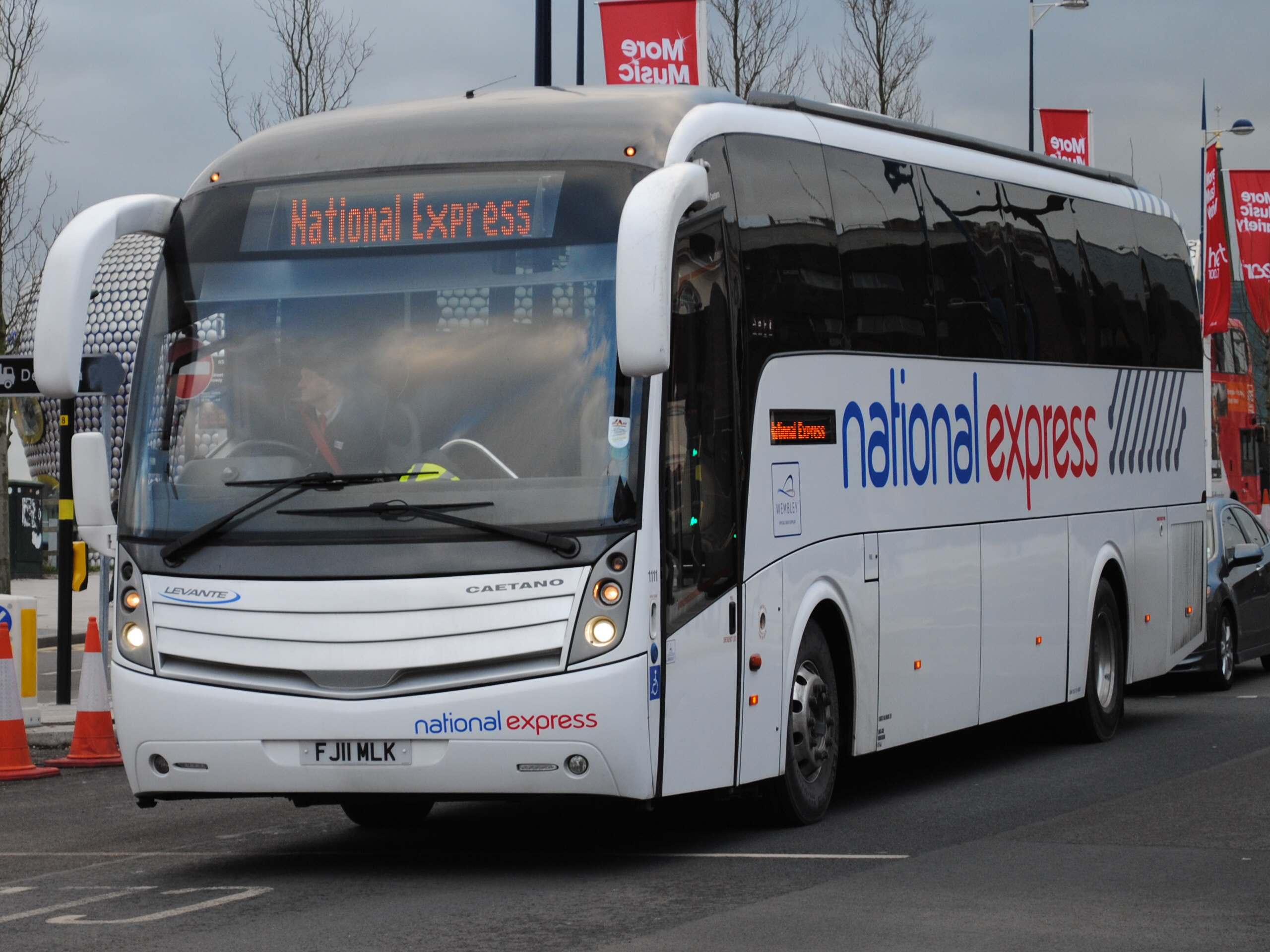
A Hallmark coach in National Express livery in 2013

In 2011, Flights Hallmark became a National Express contractor. These services have since ceased.

The contract for route 557 expired and services moved over to Falcon Buses in August 2023. On 30 August 2024 the contracts for 555, 556, 710 and 459 expired, seeing the end of these Ssrvices. They would be replaced with new services N555 and A60. The 555 would start a new contract under White Bus Services on 31 August 2024.

N555 runs the same route as the 555, but only running as far as Walton On Thames, and is a nightly service, starting at 9:50pm from Heathrow and 10:15pm from Walton and finishing at 3:30am both ways.
