= Rodboro Buildings =

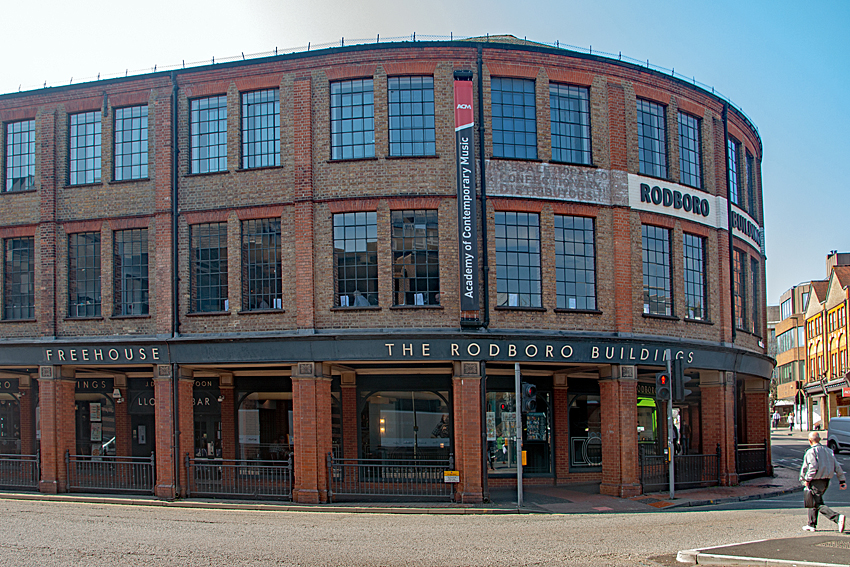
- Rodboro Buildings Onslow Street frontage

- Location within Surrey
- 51°14′12″N 0°34′39″W
- Type: Factory
- Location: Bridge Street Guildford
- OS grid reference: SU 99407 49558

History
- Built: 1901–1904

Site notes
- Area: Surrey
- Architect: John Lake
- Owner: Guildford Borough Council

Listed Building – Grade II
- Official name: Rodboro Buildings
- Designated: 31 July 1986
- Reference no.: 1029299

The Rodboro Buildings in Guildford was one of, if not the first, purpose-built car factories in England and the world. It is a Grade II listed building.

== History ==
=== Car factory ===
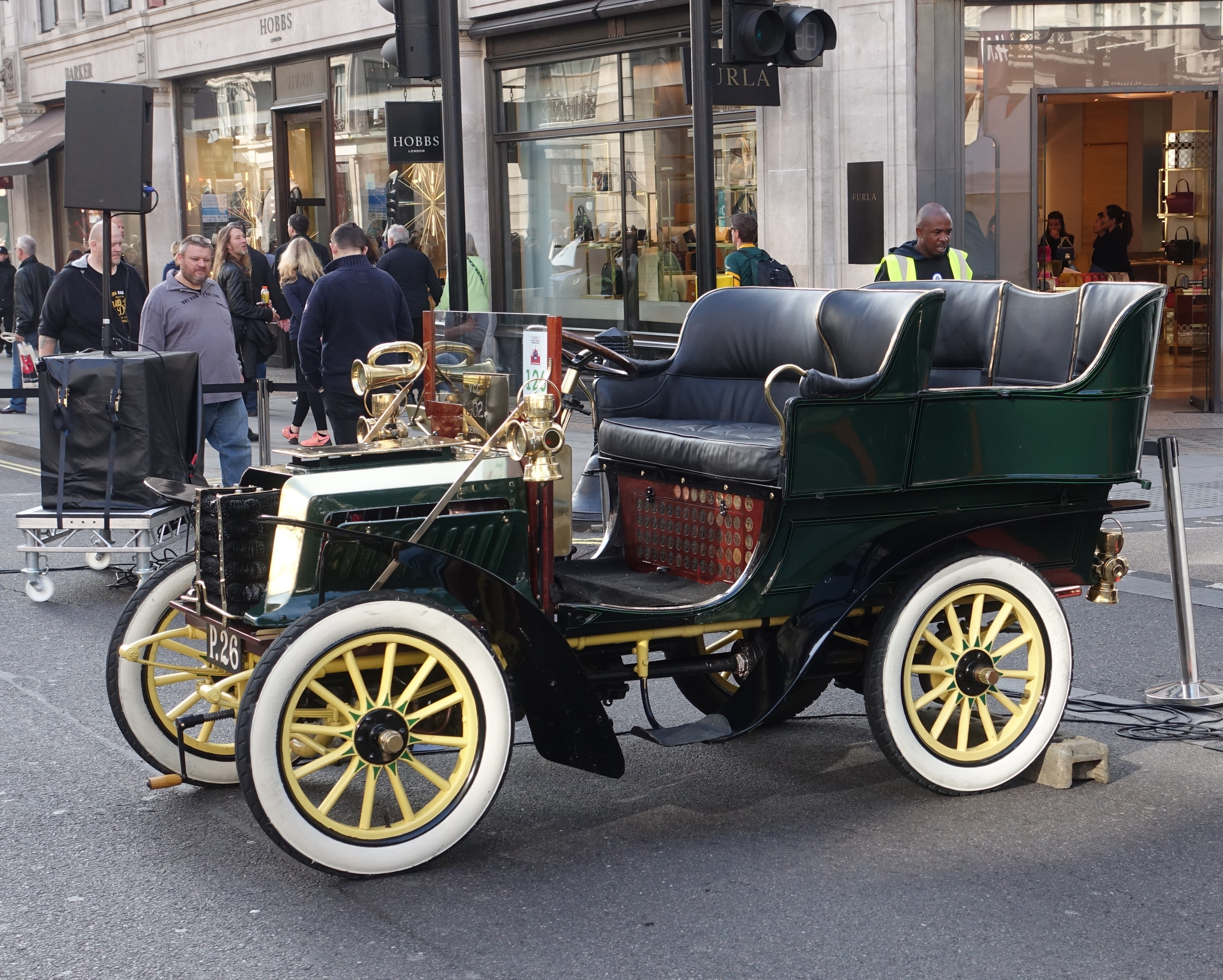
Dennis 1902 rear entrance tonneau

By 1900 John Dennis and his brother Raymond ran a successful car and cycle manufacturing company in Guildford which led them to set up workshops in the old barracks in Onslow Street. They rapidly outgrew the building and in 1901 built a new factory on a site on the corner of Bridge Street and Onslow Street. The factory consisted of three linked buildings of three stories plus a basement. They are steel framed with brown brick cladding and red brick detailing. Large windows and skylights provided plenty of natural light for the workers. The company moved into the first, western-most, bay in 1901 while the remainder of the buildings were still under construction.

The factory layout was described by the Gentleman's Magazine in 1902. The basement was given over to the stores, the ground floor contained the company offices, a showroom on the eastern side, where the building curved round to match the corner of the site, and a Crossley engine driving a dynamo to provide power to the building. Guildford Corporation's own power station, now the Electric Theatre, would be built adjacent to the factory some ten years later. The second and third floors were the assembly and finishing areas, movement of the vehicles between floors being by means of a lift at the south-eastern end of the factory. By 1902 Dennis was producing 300 vehicles a year. In addition to manufacturing, the building was also used for developmental work, the most important example being the worm driven rear axle to replace the original chain drive on cars in 1903.

In 1904 the building was extended and Dennis started making commercial vehicles as well as cars, initially vans and buses. By 1905 more space was needed and a second factory was established on a site at Woodbridge Hill, about a mile north of the town. 1908 saw the first Dennis fire engine leave the Bridge Street works. By 1913 all production had transferred to Woodbridge Hill but Bridge Street continued in use as the company offices and a commercial car servicing operation. The factory closed and was sold in 1916.

=== Boot and shoe factory ===
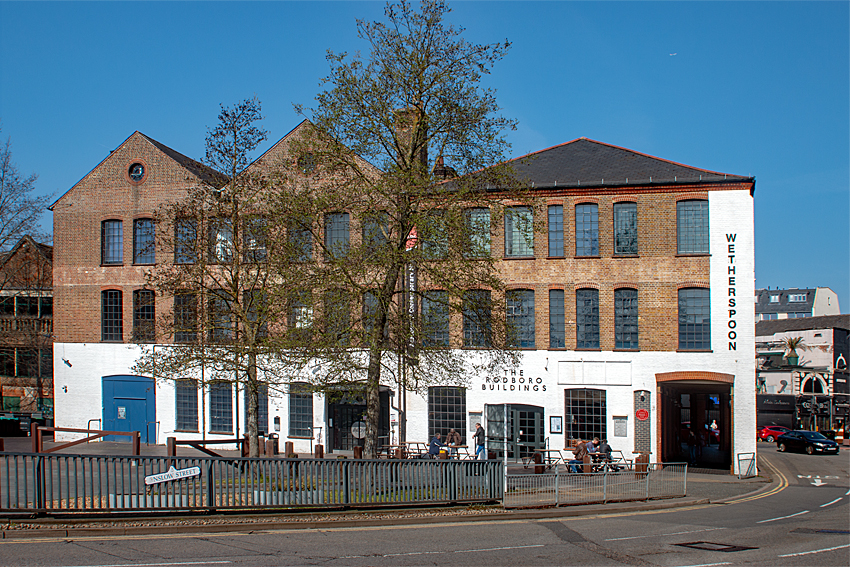
Rodboro Buildings south frontage

The building was purchased from Dennis by a local estate agency, Crowe, Bates and Turner. In 1919 the Rodboro boot and shoe company took over the premises and imported skilled workers from Northampton and Bedford. This is where the name comes from that it is known by today. Shoe manufacturing continued until 1927.

=== Subsequent use ===
By 1930 the building was once again used for engineering manufacture, being occupied by Webbers, who made hand barrows, and Blackburn Engineering. They were followed by Dowdeswell, a stationers and printers, and Taylors, a subsidiary of Kodak. The ground floor units were let as, variously, a barbers, pet shop, car spares shop and a car showroom.

=== World War II ===
At the beginning of the war, the building was used by the Red Cross for the preparation of parcels for prisoners of war. It was quickly commandeered for the manufacture of munitions which continued for the rest of the war.

=== Post war ===
Dowdeswell and Taylors returned, joined by Keefe & Lewis who made cricket sweaters for county and national teams. According to still existing signage, the building was also used as a confectionary warehouse and wholesalers. By the 1960s it housed a dance school and a number of night clubs. By the 1980s there were proposals to demolish the building as part of a road-widening scheme. In 1986, English Heritage stepped in and listed the building as Grade II for its place in the history of car making in Britain.

=== Current use ===
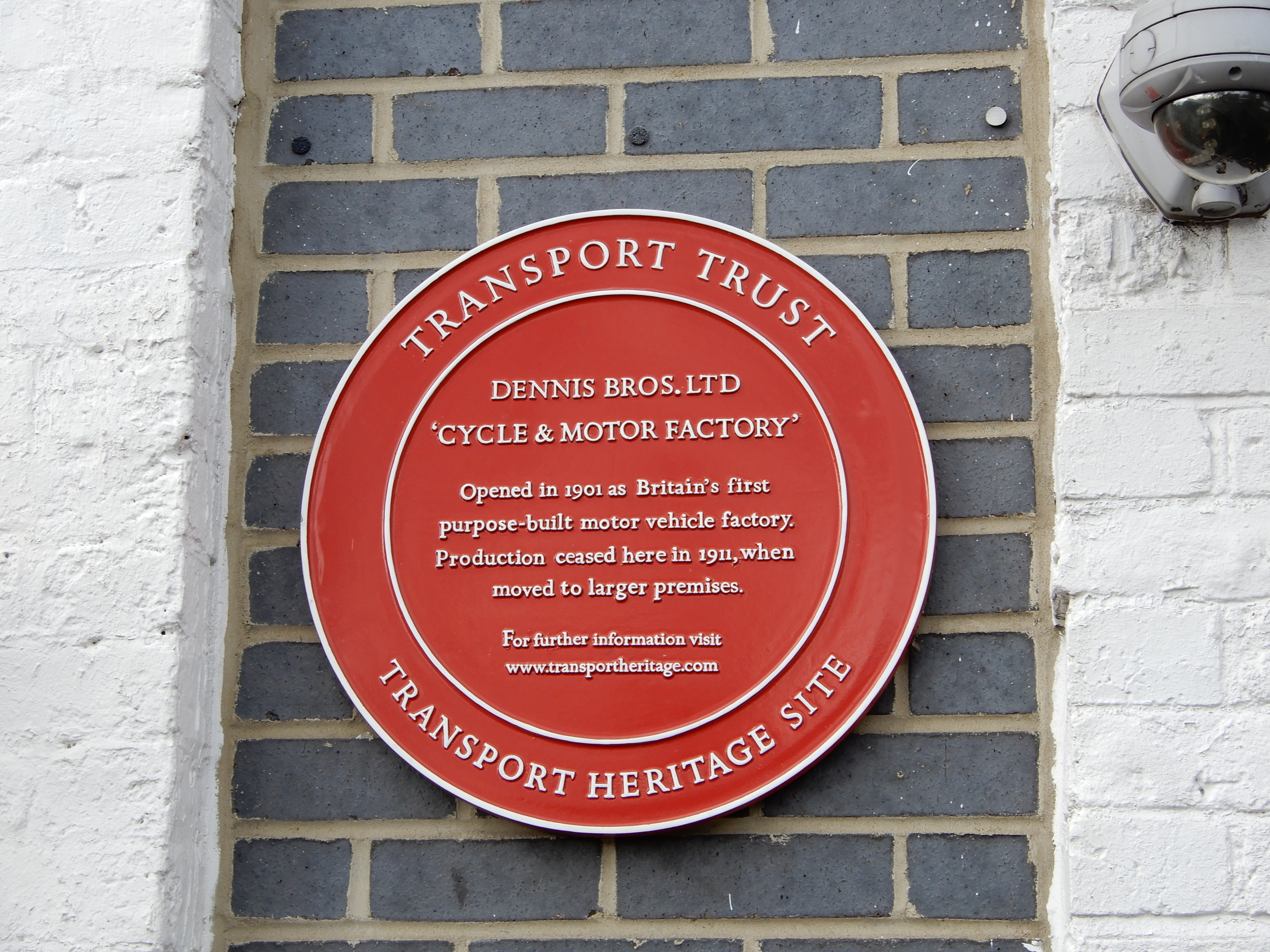
Transport Trust plaque

For 15 years after 1986 the building remained derelict until the J D Wetherspoons pub chain came to an agreement with the council to renovate it as a pub. The pub first opened on 17 December 1998 and retained the name The Rodboro Buildings. In 2013 the pub was closed for a few weeks to undertake renovation, re-opening on 6 September 2013. The opening was attended by John Dennis, grandson of one of the founders, who arrived in a Dennis 8HP car built in the factory in 1902. Members of the Dennis Society arrived in two preserved Dennis buses. The pub utilises the lower, ground and part of the first floor, with the remainder of the first floor & second floor taken over by the Academy of Contemporary Music.

== See also ==
- Dennis Specialist Vehicles
- Dennis Brothers
