= Safeguard Coaches =

Bus operator in Guildford, Surrey, England

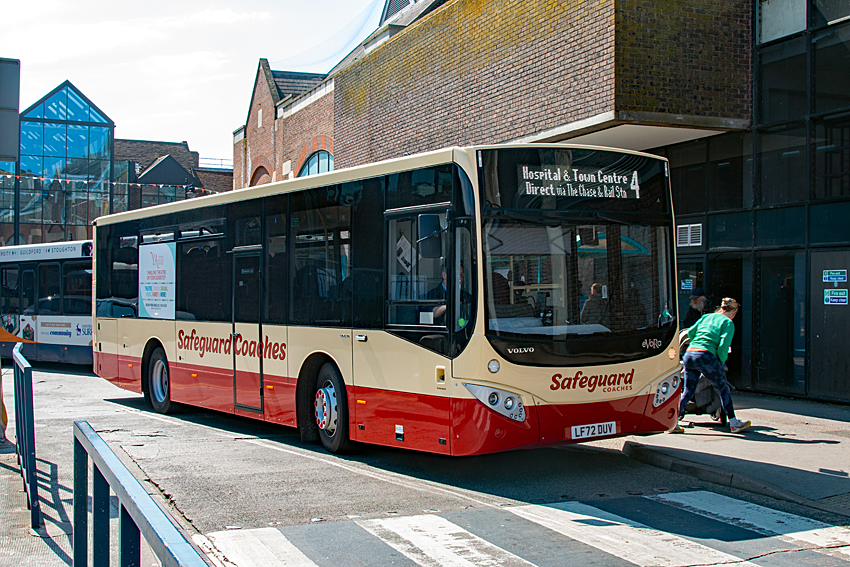
- Safeguard MCV Evora bodied Volvo B8RLE at Guildford bus station in April 2023
- Founded: 1924; 102 years ago
- Headquarters: Jacobs Well, Guildford, Surrey
- Service area: Guildford
- Service type: Bus and coach
- Destinations: Park Barn Estate; Bellfields Estate; Royal Surrey County Hospital
- Chief executive: Andrew Halliday
- Website: Official website

Safeguard Coaches is a bus and coach operator based in Guildford.

== History ==
Safeguard was established in 1924 by Arthur Newman, when he converted an accident damaged lorry to carry passengers, and by 1927 was running bus services to the newly constructed Aldershot Road housing estate. Shortly afterwards, another service to Onslow Village commenced.

However, the main company in the area Aldershot & District Traction challenged Safeguard with six months of competition. After this, the two companies agreed that Safeguard would run the Woodside and Onslow routes, and both companies the Guildford Park service. In time, Safeguard extended the Woodside route to Westborough and then to Park Barn, and the Guildford Park service reached Dennisville.

In 1988, Farnham Coaches was purchased, adding a significant number of vehicles to the Safeguard fleet.

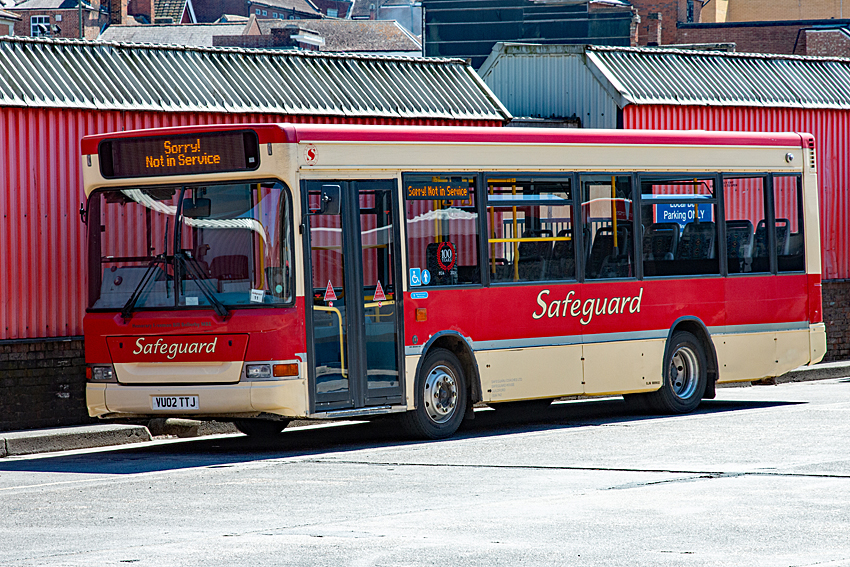
Dennis Dart originally used on the Guildford Shuttle service

In 2000, Safeguard gained the contract for the Guildford Shuttle, a free service connecting various parts of Guildford Town Centre. The Guildford Shuttle was later withdrawn in August 2008, the council saying it was costing too much to operate. The Guildford Shuttle was reinstated commercially by Safeguard in January 2009, but this did not last long as it was finally withdrawn on 22 May 2010.

In 2002, Safeguard lost some school bus work and Onslow routes 10 and 11 to Countryliner after ten years. As a result of this, the bus fleet was cut from ten to seven vehicles.

From 24 July 2010, Safeguard ran Merrow Park and Ride route 300 using Surrey County Council owned buses freed up following the withdrawal of the Ride Pegasus! school bus scheme by Surrey County Council. From September 2013, this service was passed to Stagecoach South who won the contract to operate the town's Park & Ride network.

In 2016, Safeguard launched its new Sunday service on route 5 from the town centre to the Royal Surrey County Hospital via Guildford Park, along with some other extra journeys on other days.

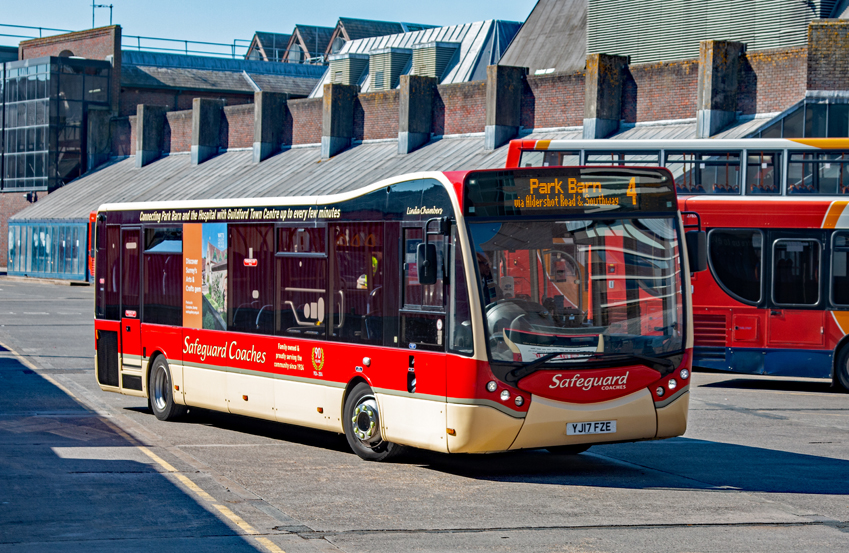
Optare MetroCity Linda Chambers at Guildford bus station

Safeguard took delivery of two examples of the Optare MetroCity, one of which had been named after long-serving employee Linda Chambers, who retired after 28 years with the firm.

Commencing 4 November 2018, Arriva launched routes A (to/from Royal Surrey County Hospital), B (to/from the Park Barn Estate) and C (to/from Stoughton) to rival the existing routes already operated by Stagecoach South and Safeguard. Safeguard retaliated with re-entry to Bellfields.

On 20 August 2021, Safeguard went live on a new mobile application - myTrip - in partnership with app and website provider Passenger.

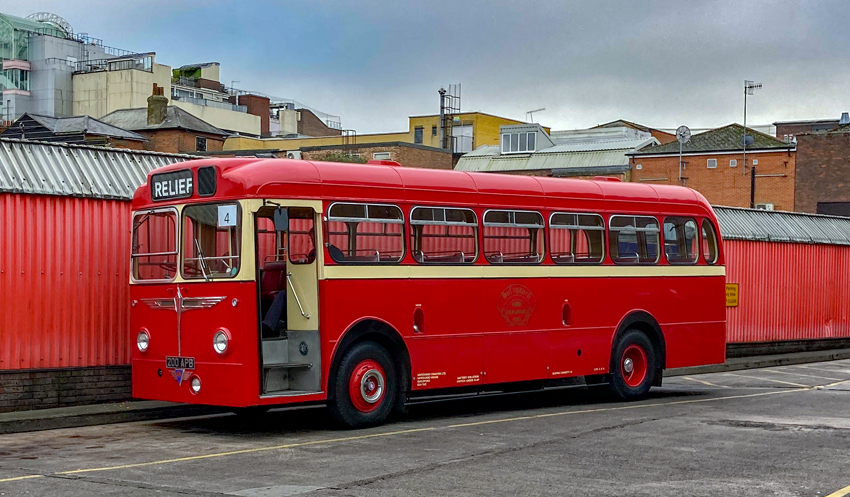
Preserved AEC Reliance at Guildford bus station, 18 December 2021

On 18 December 2021, following the withdrawal of Guildford operations by Arriva, Safeguard took control of the route 18, which ran from Onslow Village to Guildford town centre. This service was extended to Bushy Hill in Merrow via Burpham to cover gaps created by Stagecoach South's new route 6 on what were routes 36 and 37 from Arriva. This was on the same day as the company left Onslow Village 92 years previously, in 1929. A heritage bus was operated on the day of changes. From 30 August 2022, the route 18 was transferred to Compass Travel.

On 16 March 2024, the company celebrated its centenary with a bus rally at Guildford cathedral. Vintage buses operated rides around Park Barn and through Guildford Park to the town centre.

== Current services ==
=== Bus routes ===
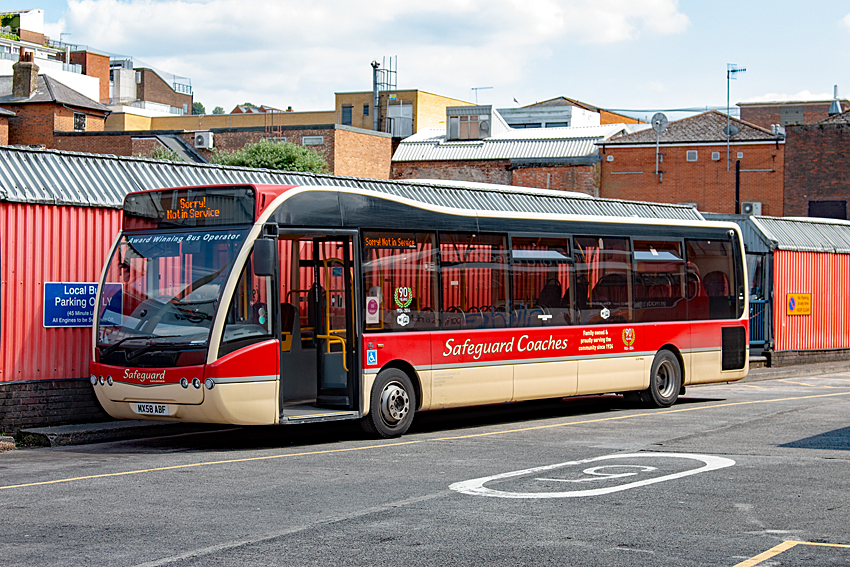
Safeguard Optare Versa at Guildford bus station

Safeguard currently operate three circular bus routes, route 3, which runs to and from Bellfields estate; and routes 4 and 5 which run in opposite directions linking Park Barn with Guildford town centre. For many years, Safeguard ran Guildford town services 3, 4 and 5 jointly with Arriva, however from 23 May 2010 the two companies agreed that Arriva would wholly run route 3 and Safeguard have complete control over the 4 and 5. As Arriva withdrew from the Guildford operations, Safeguard took over the Sundays and bank holidays services on route 3. As a result, in a little under three years the service had fully moved from Arriva to Safeguard.

From 30 August 2022, it was announced that Safeguard would take over a number of routes in the Woking area, which included four shopper's services and a school service.

=== Coaches ===
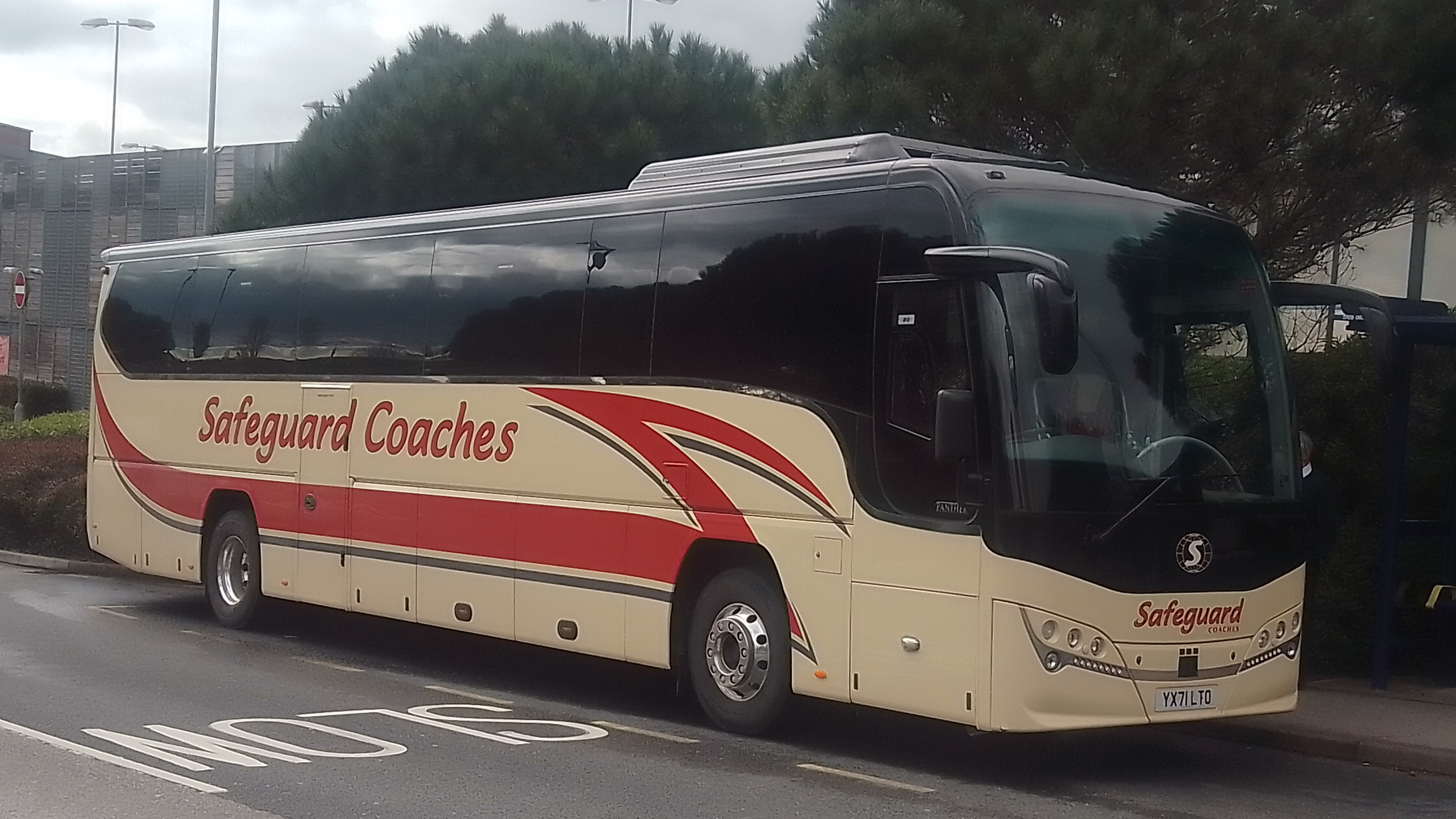
Plaxton Panther bodied Volvo B8R in Portsmouth in March 2023

Most coach work is private hire, with a high amount of it coming from local schools. Coaches are also run to the University of Surrey from various places, including areas as far afield as Crawley and Chichester.

== Fleet ==
As of 2024, Safeguard operates a fleet of 16 single-deck buses. The company also operates 18 coaches, ten of which are marketed under the Farnham Coaches brand.

== Preserved buses ==
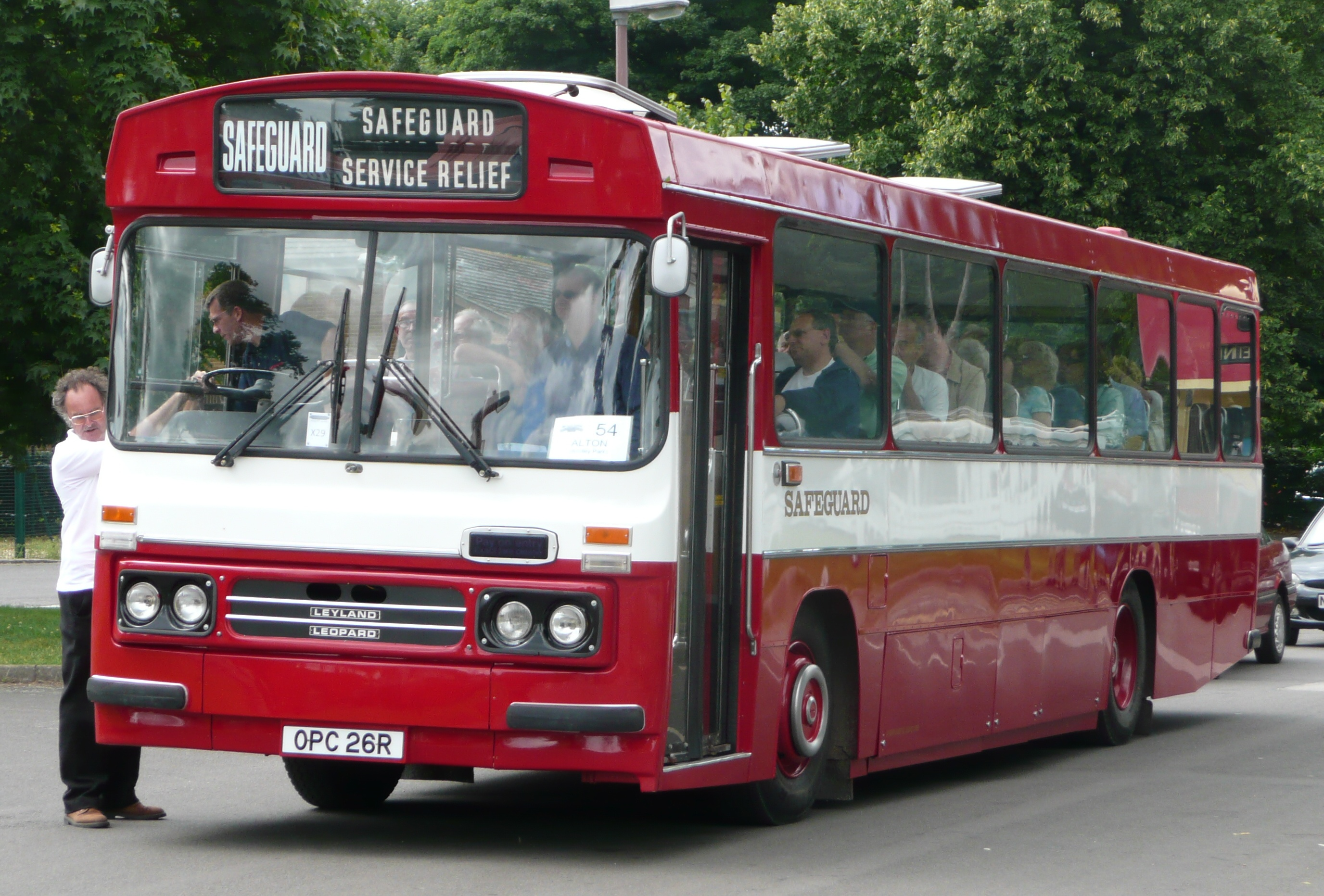
Preserved Leyland Leopard at the July 2008 Alton bus rally

Two ex-Safeguard buses have been preserved: A Leyland Leopard Duple Dominant, OPC 26R, was acquired for private preservation by Richard Kerwin and has appeared at several bus rallies. A 1956 AEC Reliance, 200 APB, sold by the company in 1961 was re-acquired in 2002 for promotional work and for vintage private hire.

The company also operates a vintage Bedford J2 Plaxton Embassy coach, originally acquired in 1966 from Cookes.

== See also ==
- List of bus operators of the United Kingdom
