= Action Woman =

- 2014 reissue picture sleeve.

Single by The Litter

from the album Distortions
- B-side: "A Legal Matter"
- Released: January 1967
- Recorded: 1966, Dove Studios, Minneapolis, Minnesota
- Genre: Garage rock; proto-grunge
- Length: 2:28
- Label: Scotty
- Songwriter: Warren Kendrick
- Producer: Warren Kendrick

The Litter singles chronology
"Action Woman" (1967)	"Somebody Help Me" (1967)

"Action Woman" is a song by the American garage rock band the Litter, written by their record producer Warren Kendrick, and first released as the group's debut single on Scotty Records in January 1967 (see 1967 in music). The song also appeared on the band's first album Distortions. Although "Action Woman" never broke out on the national charts, it is now revered as a classic piece of the musical genre of garage rock. Accordingly, the composition has appeared on several compilation albums – most famously as the opening track on Pebbles, Volume 1, incorporating a skip in the recording – and has been the subject of cover versions.

== Background ==
The Litter formed in 1966 from the remains of two locally popular Minneapolis groups, the Victors and the Tabs. Early into the group's existence, the Litter enjoyed tremendous popularity, particularly in Chicago where the band became regulars at the Electric Theatre as they performed alongside the Byrds and Jethro Tull, among others. During this time, bass guitarist and keyboardist Jim Kane got the Litter in contact with record producer Warren Kendrick, who was a capable instrumentalist in his own right before an arm injury prevented him from performing. Seeing the group's potential, Kendrick signed the Litter to a recording contract to his self-owned record label, Scotty Records, to produce their debut single and subsequent album.

"Action Woman", a Kendrick-penned composition about a man in search of a "woman who'll satisfy his soul", was chosen for the group's first release. Musically exhibiting heavy influence from the British Invasion bands the Yardbirds and the Who, "Action Woman" was marked by distorted guitar riffs and feedback provided by lead guitarist Bill Strandlof. The fuzz-toned instrumentals evident in the song were regularly utilized in the Litter's later recordings, even prompting Kendrick to name their first album Distortions. In addition to Strandlof's motif, the composition was also highlighted by Denny Waite's authoritative and snarling lead vocals, coupled with a raw musical stance emulating from the band's relatively live-recording style.

In January 1967, "Action Woman", with a cover version of Pete Townshend's "A Legal Matter" as its B-side, was released and became a regional hit in Minneapolis. The song received a broader audience when it was featured as the opening track to the highly regarded compilation album, Pebbles, Volume 1 in 1979. Music historian Richie Unterberger praised "Action Woman", saying it is "an archetype of the tough '60s garage rock favored by fans of the Pebbles reissue series". Along with its inclusion on Pebbles the composition also appears on the 1998 reissue of Nuggets: Original Artyfacts from the First Psychedelic Era, 1965–1968 and Trash Box.

The song has been covered by multiple groups. The first release of the song was by the Electras, also on Warren Kendrick’s Scotty label. Because they also share Kendrick as their producer, many record collectors were led to wrongly believe the two groups contained some of the same members.
