= The Electras (band) =

American garage rock band

- Also known as: 'Twas Brillig
- Origin: Ely, Minnesota, United States
- Genres: Garage rock; psychedelic rock; pop rock
- Years active: 1962–1967
- Labels: Scotty; Date
- Past members: Bill Bulinski; Earl Bulinski; Gary Omerza; Fred Godec; Len Erickson; Kaye Spalj; Jerry Fink; Tim Elfving; Harvey Korkki

The Electras were an American garage rock band formed in Ely, Minnesota in 1962. The group recorded between 1965 and 1967 during their musical career, including their most-known tune "Dirty Old Man". The band, which also worked under the moniker, 'Twas Brillig, released a version of the song "Action Woman", a composition that was made into a garage rock classic by the Litter, and has consequently caused the two groups to be wrongly associated with each other. (The group is also not connected with a New Hampshire band of the same name that included future US politician John Kerry.)

== History ==
The Electras were formed when brothers Bill (lead guitar, vocals) and Earl Bulinski (rhythm guitar) came together as a duo in 1962, soon after moving to Ely, Minnesota and enrolling at Ely Memorial High School. The brothers had possessed prior experience self-teaching themselves to play guitar and performing at a semi-professional level. In mid-1962, the two were interested in assembling an ensemble, first placing an advertisement in the high school newspaper that read, "Attention all bass players, please call Bill Bulinski. He wants to start a band". Gary Omerza, who was actually an accordion player, was the first to respond to Bulinski's offer. Nonetheless, the brothers accepted Omerza's desire to be a band member, and recruited Fred Godec as the Electras' bass player. Their first gig was at a club called John's Bar where the group played renditions of rock and roll favorites; however, the band was forced to vacate after the town's priest complained that the band members were too young to perform at the venue.

By the Electras' second gig, the group added Len Erickson (drums) and female-singer Kaye Spalj, while applying songs by the Ventures to their repertoire. Between 1963 and 1965, Jerry Fink replaced Erickson, and Tim Elfving became the group's lead vocalist, solidifying the band's most-known lineup. Additionally, the band hired Chuck Novak as their manager, and convinced Omerza to play the Farfisa organ, which allowed the Electras to cover compositions by Paul Revere and the Raiders and the Animals. In the fall of 1965, Novak had gotten the Electras in contact with songwriter and record producer Warren Kendrick of Dove Recording Studio to pen and record the group's debut single. The band's first release, "Bout My Love", was issued in late 1965, and charted regionally at number 39 before dropping off listings in a week.

Undaunted, Kendrick signed the Electras to his own record label named Scotty Records. Their follow-up, "This Week's Children", propelled to number 12 in Minneapolis in early 1966. It was the Electras' third single, "Dirty Old Man", that proved to be their biggest hit, as the band enjoyed 17 weeks with the record charting at number one regionally and selling 6,000 copies overall. Music historian Richie Unterberger prescribed that the group "sounded like a slightly rawer version of Paul Revere and the Raiders. That was never more true than on their regional hit 'Dirty Old Man', with its menacing unison fuzz guitar and organ lines". Danny Raustadt Eden Prairie MN and studio musician for Warren, played all guitars on Dirty Old Man and used his mid 60's Gibson ES-335TD and a Maestro Fuzz tone. Recording was at Dove studio in Burnsville MN. Though the single was on the verge of being picked up for national distribution, Bill Bulinski was drafted in July 1966 and sent to combat in Vietnam, while Novak joined the Navy. Bulinski was subsequently replaced by Ely native Harvey Korkki, and Omerza upheld the duty of arranging the Electras' concerts.

Despite losing a founding member, the group still remained a popular attraction as they expanded their touring across the Midwest. In the fall of 1966, Kendrick finally secured a distribution contract with Columbia Records to release "Dirty Old Man" with "This Week's Children" as its B-side. However, copies of the single, which were issued on the subsidiary Date Records, were recalled as it was discovered that the Electras' name was copyrighted by another group who released an album in 1961 that included future Massachusetts Senator and Secretary of State, John Kerry. Without the band's input, Kendrick changed their name to 'Twas Brillig, and rereleased "Dirty Old Man" in February 1967. Elfving was drafted for service in Vietnam soon after, which consequently resulted in the group losing advertising support from Columbia. The band recorded two more singles under the moniker, but could not replicate their past successes and disbanded.

A confusion over the Electras' relations with fellow Minneapolis group the Litter has prompted record collectors to widely believe the two bands shared the same members. This was a result of Kendrick producing both groups, and the Electras' recording of the Litter's most accomplished song "Action Woman". The Electras' rendition included a baroque pop-influenced instrumental intro not present in the Litter's more reissued piece. In addition a compilation album, Rare Tracks, included the two groups together and mistakenly claimed in the sleeve notes that Warren "used the Litter musicians to record also some obscure singles under the name of 'Twas Brilling, Electras...Thus 'Dirty Old Man' or 'Soul Searchin' were played identically by Litter under several names of groups." However, other than for having the same producer and record label, the bands have no correlation between each other.

In 2010, the Electras were inducted into the Mid-America Music Hall of Fame, which saw original group members reconvene for a reunion concert. The band's material has been compiled on The Scotty Story and The Best of the Electras.

Gary Omerza (born on August 1, 1946) died unexpectedly on July 25, 2011, at age 64. Earl Bulinski died suddenly on April 3, 2021, in South Padre Island, Texas at age 72.
