= London Buses route 467 =

London bus route

467
- Falcon Buses Alexander Dennis Enviro400 in Chessington in September 2026

Overview
- Operator: Falcon Buses
- Garage: Byfleet
- Vehicle: Alexander Dennis Enviro400
- Peak vehicle requirement: 2
- Predecessors: Route 468
- Night-time: No night service

Route
- Start: Hinchley Wood School (one morning and one afternoon schoolday-only journey from Epsom); Hook
- Via: Chessington; Ewell
- End: Epsom; Epsom Hospital (one morning and one afternoon schoolday-only journey from Hook)
- Length: 6 miles (9.7 km)

Service
- Level: Monday to Saturday
- Frequency: About every 60 minutes
- Journey time: 23-29 minutes
- Operates: 06:20 until 19:34
- "Performance" (PDF). tfl.gov.uk.

London Buses route 467 is a Transport for London contracted bus route in London and Surrey, England. Running between Hinchley Wood School and Epsom Hospital, it is operated by Falcon Buses.

== History ==
The route has roots from the London Country route 468 which was introduced in May 1946 in time for the first post-war Epsom Derby, which went from what was then Chessington Zoo to Effingham via Epsom Hospital. It was renumbered 467 in 1999 after London suffix lettered bus routes were renumbered; 68A became route 468, so the 468 became the 467, which had previously been used as a London Transport country route between Horton Kirby and Sidcup.

In early 2005, it was suggested that the route be merged with the K4, providing a service between Epsom Hospital and Kingston Hospital. This did not go ahead as a result of a lack of funding from Surrey Council, a lack of buses small enough to operate the route (the K4 uses small low-floor buses whereas the 467 uses double-deckers), an inability to cope with the school appendages on certain 467 journeys, and difficulty finding a suitable route through Hook, Mansfield Park and Winey Park.

In 2006, the route was considered for withdrawal by Transport for London but was saved after it attracted additional funding from Surrey County Council.

Certain journeys on the route carry on to Epsom Hospital for Rosebery School. In addition, since 2009 the 467 has covered the journeys of the discontinued 833 Surrey service from Hook to Hinchley Wood School (which like the 467 was contentiously considered for withdrawal in 2006 but unlike the 467 was actually withdrawn that year), making it the only route to contain school-hour extensions at both ends of the route.

It is also the only link between Chessington and Epsom that does not necessitate a change at Tolworth or Surbiton, which would result in an additional journey time and expense, as a second bus must be boarded in order to continue the journey. This can be attributed to the fact that in April 1965 the Borough of Epsom and Ewell opted not to become part of Greater London.

On 19 June 2021, the route was transferred to London United as part of RATP Group's plans to close the Quality Line subsidiary.

On 28 February 2025, the route passed from London United to First Bus London following the acquisition of RATP Dev Transit London by FirstGroup. In September 2026, the route was taken over by Falcon Buses.

== Current route ==
Route 467 operates via these primary locations:

- Hinchley Wood School (schoolday-only journeys from Epsom)
- Hook
- Chessington South station
- Chessington Town Centre
- Chessington Copt Gilders Estate
- Ewell West station
- Epsom High Street for Epsom station
- Epsom Hospital (schoolday-only journeys from Hook)

== See also ==
- List of bus routes in London
