= Pisse =

German punk band

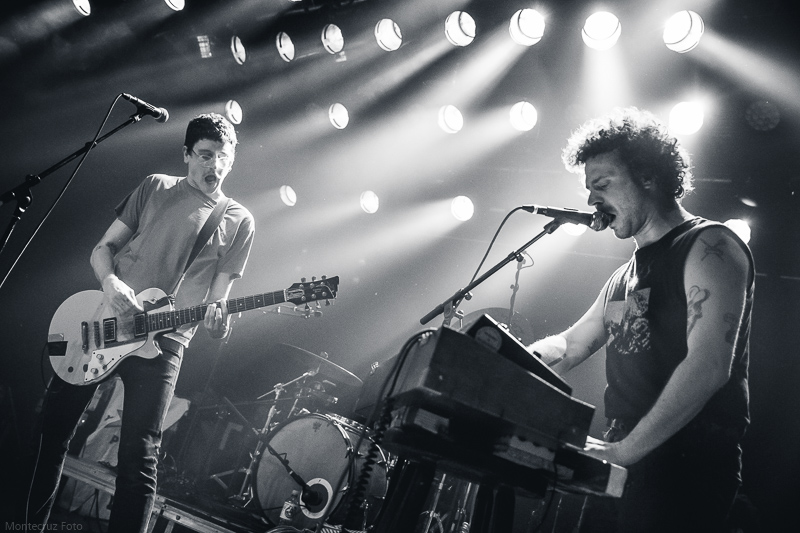
The band performing at SO36 in 2018

Pisse (English translation: Piss) is a German punk band formed in 2012 in Hoyerswerda, Saxony. Pisse is well-known within the new German punk scene, having performed nationwide in cities such as Wuppertal, Karlsruhe, Munich, and Zürich, as well as outside the German-speaking world in Antwerp, Paris and Amsterdam.

Pisse has released three full-length studio albums on the German independent label Phantom Records (not to be confused with the Australian label of the same name), as well as seven EPs. Some of their releases are out of print and difficult to find. Despite their obscurity, the band enjoys recognition from fans.

Pisse is featured in the book "Damaged Goods: 150 Einträge in die Punk-Geschichte" also known as "Damaged Goods: 150 Entries into Punk History" by music journalist Jonas Engelmann. Their song "Fahrradsattel", (which translates to Bicycle Seat in English) which is about cunnilingus, went viral in 2021 via a trending audio on the social network TikTok.

== Style ==
Musically, the band distinguishes itself through harsh, characteristic vocals, fast tempo, and the use of synthesizers and theremins. In terms of their songs' lyrics and content Pisse primarily sings about common and relatable situations, but puts them within altered contexts. A lot their music has a tendency to lean towards heavier topics such as mental health issues (primarily insanity and depression), giving them a great voice of dark humor.

German newspaper Die Tageszeitung considers Pisse a part of the German post-punk renaissance scene, a musical style inspired by the punk rockers of the 1980s. Zusammen mit Puff! rates Pisse as "snottier" and "more sarcastic" than other bands, comparing them to another German punk band; Die Goldenen Zitronen.

== Discography ==
=== Studio albums ===
1. 2015: Mit Schinken durch die Menopause (LP, Phantom Records, PHNTM10 / Beau Travail BT-09)
2. 2020: Pisse s/t (LP, Phantom Records, PHNTM46 / Harbinger Sound, Harbinger191)
3. 2024: Dubai (LP, Phantom Records, PHNTM100)

=== Singles and EPs ===
1. 2013: Kairo / Pisse / Dikloud (Split-10"-EP, Mamma Leone, Mamma Leone Records 001)
2. 2014: Praktikum in der Karibik (7"-EP, Mamma Leone, MLR003 / Neuauflage: Phantom Records, PHNTM09, 2014/15/16)
3. 2016: Kohlrübenwinter #1 (7"-EP, Phantom Records, PHNTM15 / Beau Travail, BT-12)
4. 2016: Kohlrübenwinter #2 (7"-EP, Harbinger Sound, Harbinger162 / In A Car, In A Car 004)
5. 2018: Pisse / Perky Tits (Split-10"-EP, Phantom Records, PHNTM24)
6. 2018: Hornhaut ist der beste Handschuh (7"-EP, Phantom Records, PHNTM29)
7. 2022: Lambada (7"-EP, Phantom Records, PHNTM76)
8. 2024: Jammertal / Vetschau (7"-EP, Phantom Records, PHNTM84)

=== Compilation Albums ===
- 2014: Kassette (MC Compilation, Phantom Records, PHNTM07)
