= White Bus Services =

English bus operator

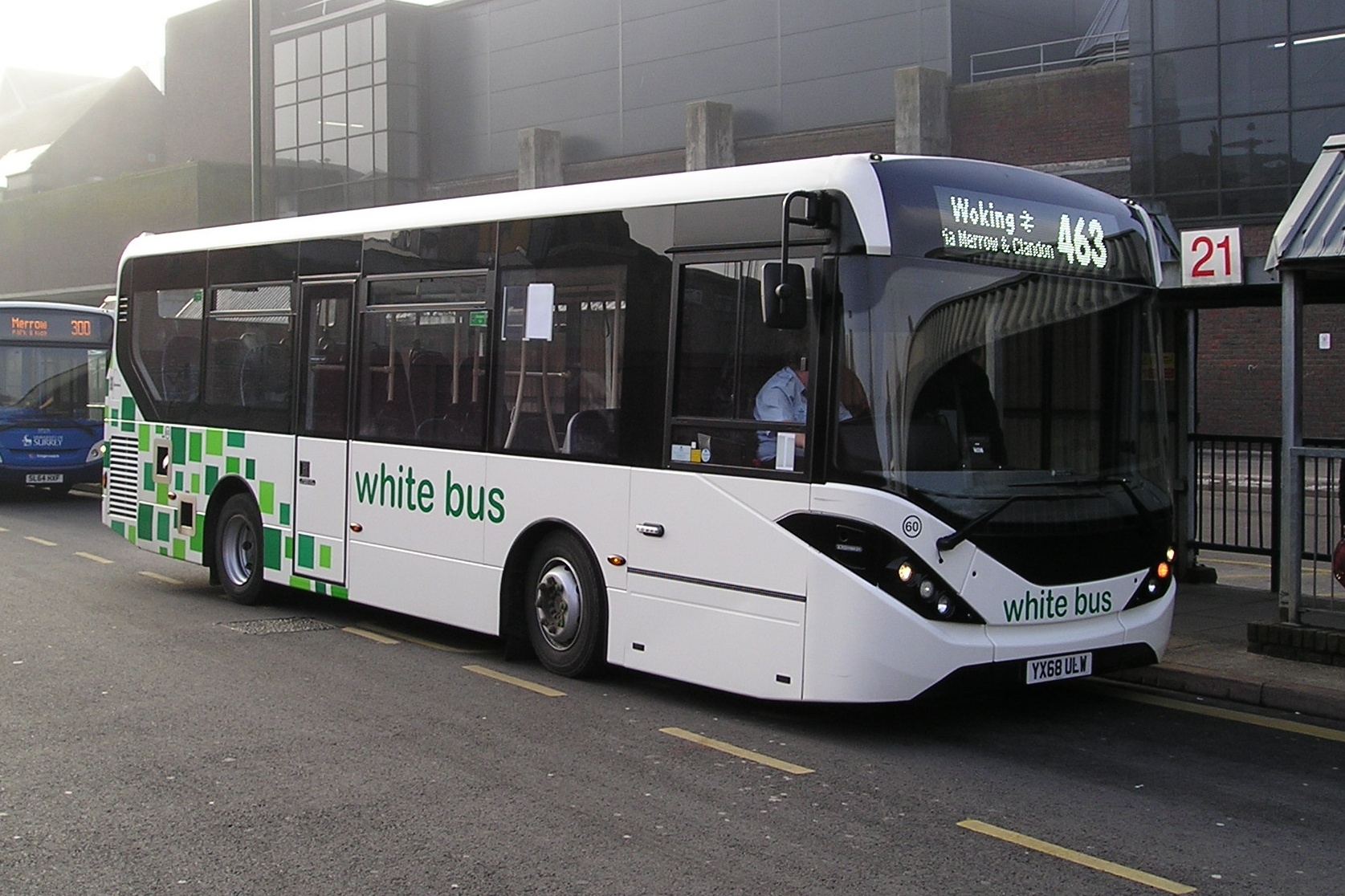
- Alexander Dennis Enviro200 MMC at Guildford bus station in January 2019
- Parent: Rowgate Group
- Founded: 1922 (as Republic Bus Company); 1930 (as White Bus Services)
- Headquarters: Winkfield
- Service area: Berkshire
- Service type: Bus service
- Destinations: Windsor, Woking, Guildford, Ascot, Staines, Frimley
- Fleet: 55 (Jan 2020)
- Chief executive: Simon Rowland
- Website: www.whitebus.co.uk

C.E. Jeatt & Sons Limited, trading as White Bus Services (sometimes shortened to White Bus), is a bus operator based in Berkshire and runs bus and coach hire services within Windsor and Ascot. It is part of the Rowgate Group.

== History ==
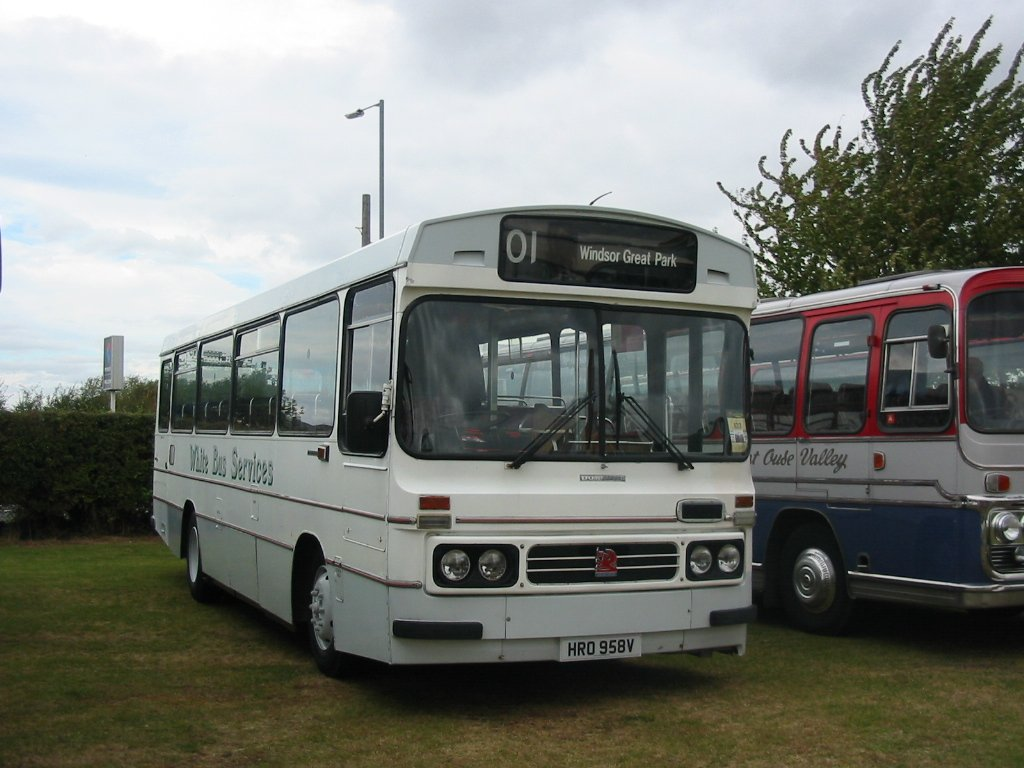
White Bus Services Bedford YLQ/Duple at Showbus in 2004

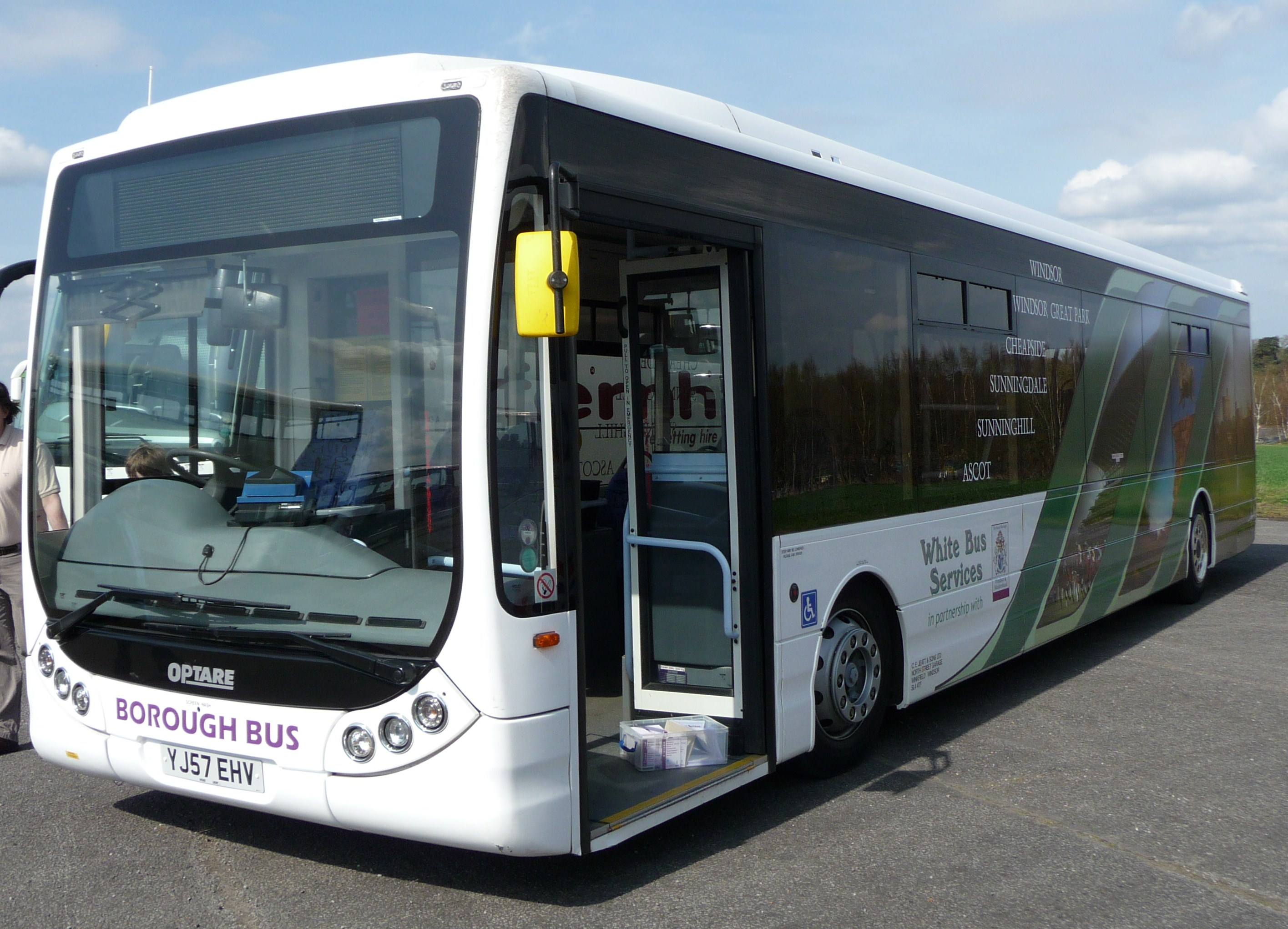
White Bus Services Optare Tempo at Wisley Airfield in 2009

White Bus Services was founded by George Ackroyd in July 1922 in Winkfield as the Republic Bus Company, introducing a service linking Windsor and Ascot. Ackroyd ran the business until selling it to William Rule Jeatt in 1930, renaming it as White Bus Services. The company would continue to be run by the Jeatt family for over 80 years, passing down to Cecil Jeatt, then in 1972 to his son Doug Jeatt.

In 1932, a new service was introduced that skirted the edge of Windsor Great Park. By 1936, buses were running through the park itself, and White Bus remains as the only operator to provide a public transport link into the park.

The private hire side of the business became a separate company in 1955, despite continuing to share the same site, operating as Winkfield Coaches. The two companies were re-amalgamated in 1990.

White Bus further expanded in 1987 when it acquired vehicles and contracted school services from A. Moore & Sons (trading as Imperial) in Windsor upon the company's closure. This, alongside the introduction of free school transport for eligible pupils, has led to White Bus developing a network of school services in Windsor, Ascot, Maidenhead and Wokingham.

In 2014, White Bus was awarded contracts to operate routes P1 and W1.

=== Acquisition by Rowgate Group ===
White Bus Services was sold to Fernhill Travel of Bracknell in November 2016, which is managed by Rowgate Group's chairman, Simon Rowland.

In 2017, following Abellio's departure from Surrey bus operations, White Bus was awarded contracts in the Staines area for routes 438, 566/567, and Sunday operations of routes 446 and 456. It also registered the Monday to Saturday service of the 446 commercially. Later, it commercially took over route 441 from Abellio in March 2018.

In September 2018, White Bus won more contracts from Surrey County Council, mainly in the Woking area, taking over routes 437, 462/463 and two morning journeys on route 81 from Arriva Guildford & West Surrey. It also took over routes 48 and 500 from Dickson Travel of Frimley Green. Five more Alexander Dennis Enviro200 MMCs joined the fleet, these being the 8.9m examples to Euro VI specification. To celebrate their centenary anniversary, White Bus bought two 10.8 m variants of the same model, which arrived in January 2020.

In December 2022, White Bus announced it would not be participating in the government's £2 fixed price bus fare scheme.

In June 2023, the company was taken to an Employment Tribunal over the unlawful and unfair dismissal of a former employee. The former employee won the case in January 2024.

Since August 2023, there were a number of route changes and additions to White Bus such as route 458 (running between Staines and Kingston upon Thames) from Diamond South East, December 2023 with route 446 extended from Staines to Ashford Hospital, Heathrow Airport and Hatton Cross tube station, alongside an increased frequency to half-hourly throughout the core Woking-Staines section, and September 2024 with another service from Diamond South East, route 555 (running between Heathrow Airport to Whiteley Village).

== Services ==
As of January 2023, White Bus Services runs 19 public services. The majority of the routes would start at Staines, Windsor or Woking and would terminate elsewhere within Berkshire or Surrey.

From April 2025, routes 462 and 463, between Woking and Guildford, were extended to serve RHS Garden Wisley.
