= Guildford bus station =

Bus station in Surrey, England

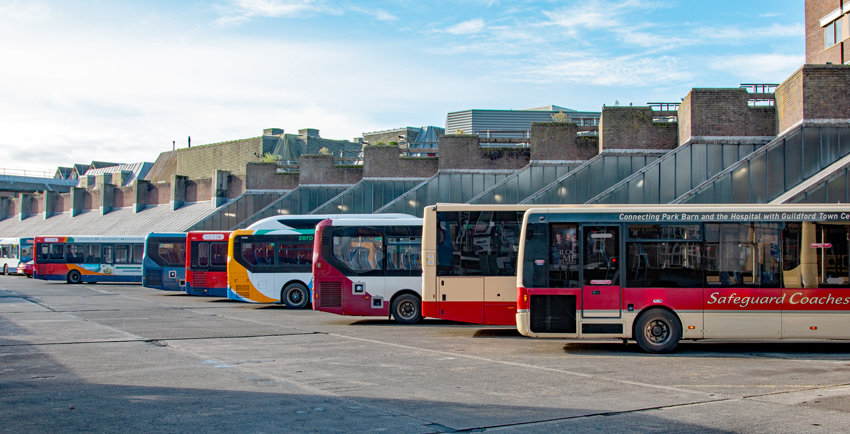
- Friary bus station

General information
- Location: Commercial Road; Guildford
- Coordinates: 51°14′15″N 0°34′34″W
- Operator: Surrey County Council
- Bus stands: 22
- Bus operators: Carlone Buses; Compass Bus; Falcon Coaches; Reptons Coaches; Safeguard Coaches; Stagecoach South; White Bus Services
- Connections: Guildford station 500 m (550 yd)
Location

Guildford bus station serves the town of Guildford, Surrey, England. Also known as the Friary bus station, it is located on the east side of the Friary Shopping Centre. The bus station was opened on 2 November 1980, replacing the former bus stations on the Farnham Road and Onslow Street.

== Description ==
Guildford is served by many bus routes from Woking, Aldershot, Godalming and other local places in Surrey. The main bus station, which is the terminus for all routes heading into Guildford, is on Commercial Road (off North Street). It has 22 stands with stands 1–15 accessed from the covered area adjacent to the Friary Centre and 16–22 situated alongside Commercial Road. All arriving buses off-load passengers at the entrance to the station.

The bus station was refurbished in 2010 with Guildford Borough Council and Surrey County Council investing in the improvements.

== Redevelopment ==
On 1 September 2026, work started on the redevelopment of the bus station as part of a major commercial and residential development of the triangle of land betwween Leapale Road, Commercial Road and North Street. The Commercial Road stands will be reduced to two from seven stands. Buses from the north and east of Guildford will enter from the Leapale Road end and loop round to enter the main stands, while those from the south and west will still be able to enter from the North Street end.

== Service operators ==
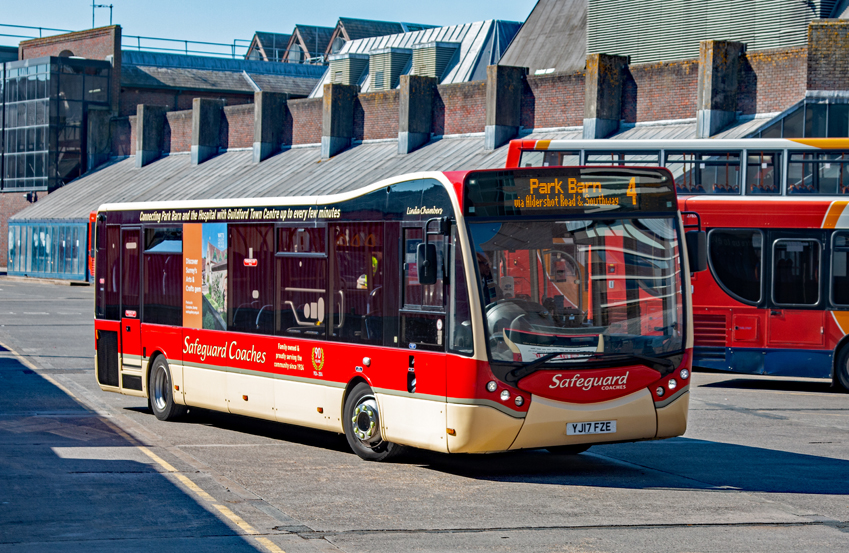
Safeguard Optare MetroCity Linda Chambers approaching Stand 11

Principal bus companies operating from the Friary are:

- Carlone Buses
- Compass Bus
- Falcon Coaches
- Reptons Coaches
- Safeguard Coaches
- Stagecoach South
- White Bus Services

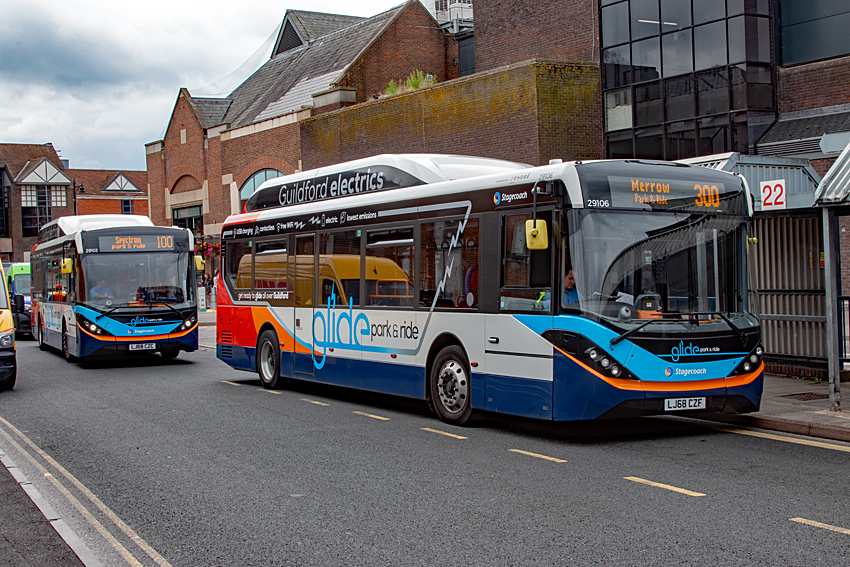
Guildford park and ride buses on the Commercial Road stands

Stagecoach operates services 1 and 2 on contract to Surrey University, linking the two campuses, Royal Surrey County Hospital, and the principal student residential areas. It also operates the park and ride services using a fleet of nine electric buses.
