= Falcon Coaches =

Bus and coach company

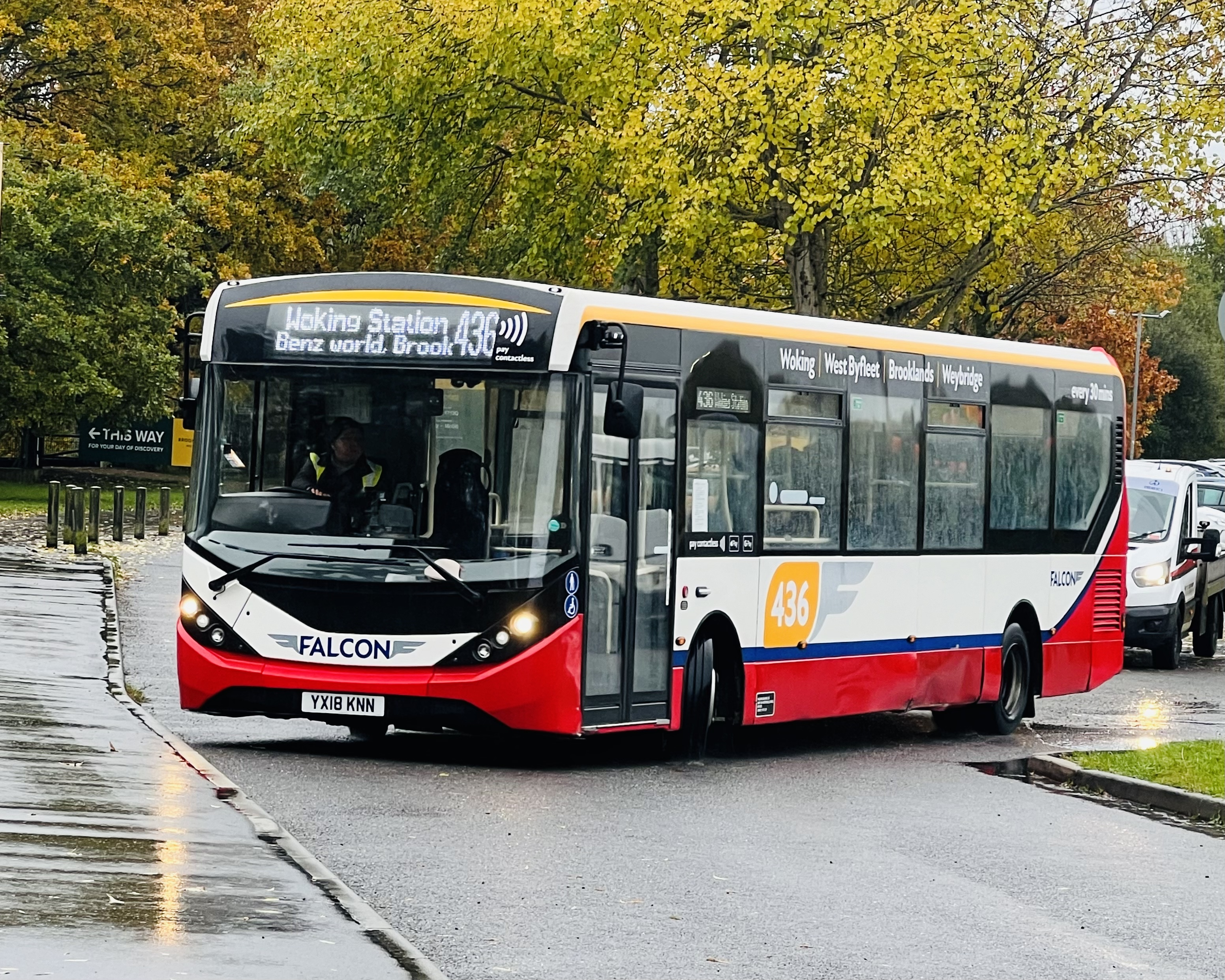
- Alexander Dennis Enviro200 MMC in November 2023
- Parent: Richard Telling
- Founded: June 2012
- Headquarters: Byfleet, England
- Service area: Surrey
- Routes: 24 (September 2026)
- Hubs: Cromwell Road bus station Guildford bus station
- Depots: 1
- Fleet: 56 (July 2026)
- Website: www.falconcoaches.co.uk www.falconbuses.co.uk

Falcon Coaches Limited, trading as Falcon Coaches and Falcon Buses, is a bus and coach company based in Byfleet, England, operating services in London and Surrey.

== History ==
Falcon Travel was founded by Tony Risby. In June 2012 the business was incorporated, renamed Falcon Coaches and sold to Richard Telling of the Tellings-Golden Miller family. At this stage it operated four vehicles from a depot in Shepperton. In June 2012, Hounslow Minicoaches was acquired adding another four vehicles.

In September 2016 Falcon Coaches was awarded a contract by Surrey County Council to operate bus services serving Hersham, Esher, Molesey, Thames Ditton, Surbiton and Kingston. The Falcon Buses brand was introduced for these services. In September 2018 it took over route 461 from Abellio Surrey.

In September 2026, Falcon Buses became a Transport for London-contracted operator as it took over route 467 from First Bus London subsidiary London United. It also took over operations of the Kingston University inter campus contract from First Bus London subsidiary London United in the same month.

== Garage ==
Falcon Buses operates their bus routes from a single garage in Byfleet.

=== Byfleet (BF) ===
Byfleet garage operates routes 408, 436, 437, 456, 461, 479, 514, 515, 557, 564, 615, 714, 715, 814, E5 and E16. Byfleet garage also operates Transport for London-contracted route 467 and Kingston University-contracted routes KU1 and KU2.

== Fleet ==
As of July 2026, the fleet consists of 56 vehicles.
