= Hotel Hoppa =

Bus Network in Longford, United Kingdom

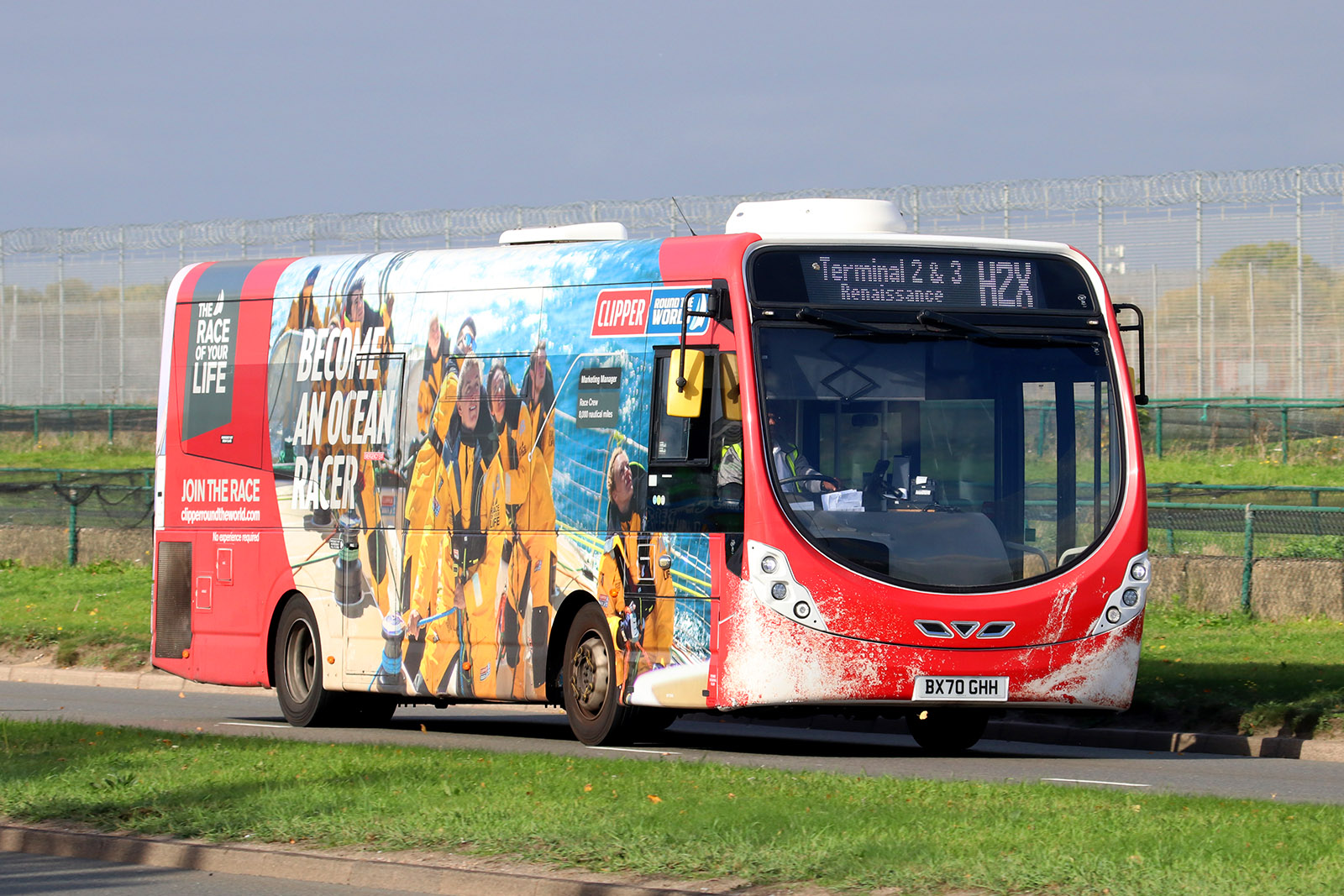
- A Hotel Hoppa route H2X bus along Southern Perimeter Road outside Heathrow Airport in 2025
- Parent: Hallmark Connections
- Founded: 1990s
- Headquarters: Hounslow
- Service type: Bus services
- Routes: 11
- Hubs: Heathrow Airport
- Depots: 1
- Fleet: 37
- Operator: Hallmark
- Website: hotelhoppa.co.uk

Hotel Hoppa is a network of bus services owned and operated by Rotala, connecting major hotels near Heathrow Airport with Terminals 2&3 and Terminal 5. It operates eleven routes. The business became part of Rotala at the end of 2017, following its acquisition from National Express. It is operated under Rotala's Hallmark Connections brand.

== History ==
The network was originally operated with a fleet of 1997 built Wright Crusader bodied Volvo B6LEs, which were painted in National Express circles livery with the red replaced by light blue. In 2008 these were replaced by 32 Alexander Dennis Enviro200 Darts painted in National Express white and grey livery. In 2019 5 Wright Streetlite DFs were added to the fleet.

== Fares and competition ==
As of 2024, Hotel Hoppa fares start at £6.80 per adult for a single and £12.00 for a return. There is a 50p surcharge per journey to buy a ticket on the bus. Up to two children per adult are free.

The alternative is London Transport buses with most area hotels reached for the price of a standard bus fare.
