= The Litter =

American psychedelic/garage rock band

- Origin: Minneapolis, Minnesota, United States
- Genres: Garage rock; psychedelic rock; Proto-Punk
- Years active: 1966-1972 (reunions thereafter)
- Labels: Hexagon; ABC
- Past members: Dan Rinaldi; Bill Strandlof; Denny Waite; Jim Kane; Tom Murray; Mark Gallagher; Ray Melina; Tom Caplan; Sean Jones; Lonnie Knight; Mike Rowe

The Litter was an American psychedelic and garage rock band, formed in 1966 in Minneapolis, Minnesota, United States. They are best remembered for their 1967 debut single, "Action Woman". The group recorded three albums in the late 1960s before disbanding, but they re-united in 1990, 1992, and again in 1998, when they recorded a new studio album consisting of both old and new material. All of their Minneapolis recorded material was produced by Warren Kendrick, who owned the Scotty and Warick and Hexagon labels.

== History ==
Four members of the original line-up, Jim Kane, Bill Strandlof, Denny Waite, and Dan Rinaldi formed the band in 1966 from the remains of two popular Minneapolis bands: The Victors and The Tabs. Tom Murray joined as a result of a successful band audition. Their group name was presented by Jim Kane and accepted over other suggestions like "The Mustys".

Heavily influenced by the bands of the British Invasion, the group recorded their debut single "Action Woman" / "A Legal Matter" in late 1966. "Action Woman" proved to be their most impactful single and became a garage rock classic. Bill Strandlof, lead guitarist for the single, was replaced by Tom Caplan just before their debut album Distortions was released in the summer of 1967. Distortions leaned on cover songs, but became a classic that would be re-released when garage rock was revived.

By 1968, the band had shifted to the psychedelic rock scene. Their second album, $100 Fine, included original input from the band and British-influenced cover material. Although the album did not chart nationally, it did chart at number 10 on the Twin Cities chart. Their writer/producer, Warren Kendrick, had developed a method to precisely control the flanging effect (which eventually became a staple of psychedelic recordings) and he applied it to a cover version of a Procol Harum song, "Kaleidoscope." A highlight for the band that year was their brief appearance in the movie, Medium Cool. Their scene in the movie however, was overdubbed by The Mothers of Invention's song, "Flower Punk". Further work on the soundtrack was also replaced by Frank Zappa tracks. The band, later in the year, turned down offers by Elektra Records and Columbia Records, which slowed their progress to the national scene.

In 1969, the band finally signed to a major label. Their third album, Emerge was released on the ABC Records label and became their most successful. It peaked at number 175 on the Billboard 200. However, recording for the album did not include Caplan or Waite. There were heavier rock tracks on the album. The group disbanded in 1972.

The group continued to tour with several different line-ups sporadically thereafter, and released an album of new material in 1998.

In 2020, Tom Murray, with talented new players including Larry Wiegand of Crow, released a Litter album, Future of the Past. Tom “Zippy” Caplan (Distortions and $100 Fine) also plays lead guitar on several tracks.

== Personnel ==
- Jim Kane - bass guitar and moog synthesizer, 1966-1970 & 1990
- Tom Murray - drums, 1966-1972 & 1992 (born Cleveland, Ohio, 1948)
- Dan Rinaldi - rhythm guitar, backing vocals - 1966-1972 & 1992 (Minneapolis, May 1, 1945 – June 5, 2015)
- Bill Strandlof - lead guitar, 1966-1967 (St Paul, Minnesota, 1946 – March 4, 1995)
- Denny Waite - organ, lead vocals, harmonica, 1966–1968, 1990–1992, 1995-2012 (born St Paul, April 14, 1948)
- Tom 'Zippy' Caplan - lead guitar, 1967-1968 & 1990-1992 (born St Paul, August 18, 1946; left to form White Lightning with Woody Woodrich in 1968)
- Lonnie Knight - lead guitar and vocals, 1968
- Mark Gallagher - vocals 1968-1970 & 1992 (Mark Patrick Gallagher; March 17, 1948 – February 24, 2009)
- Ray Melina - lead guitar, 1968–1970
- Sean Jones - lead guitar, 1970 (Sean Jones aka Jack Stanley Jones aka Sean C. Marshall born October 9, 1948, died February 13, 2011)
- Jon Sutphen - bass, 1970
- Casey Macpherson, vocals, 1971–1972
- Mike Rowe - bass 1971–1972
- John King - lead guitar 1971 - 1972
- Woody Woodrich, bass, 1970
- Mick Stanhope, vocals, 1992
- Bob Hood - 1992
- Rick Ottum - 1992
- Joe Scanlan - drums, 1998–2005
- Doug Hassman - rhythm and lead guitar, 2005–2007
- Kenny Carson - rhythm guitar and bass, 2005 and 2012–present

=== Line-ups ===
1966 – Summer 1967	Summer 1967 – Mid 1968	Mid 1968 – Late 1968	Late 1968 – 1970
Denny Waite – lead vocals, organ, harmonica; Billy Strandlof – lead guitar; Dan Rinaldi – rhythm guitar, backing vocals; Jim Kane – bass, backing vocals; Tom Murray – drums, percussion	Denny Waite – lead vocals, organ, harmonica; Dan Rinaldi – rhythm guitar, backing vocals; Jim Kane – bass, backing vocals, organ; Tom Murray – drums, percussion; Tom "Zippy" Kaplan – lead guitar, backing vocals, special effects	Dan Rinaldi – rhythm guitar, backing vocals; Jim Kane – bass, backing vocals; Tom Murray – drums, percussion; Lonnie Knight – lead guitar, lead vocals	Dan Rinaldi – rhythm guitar, backing vocals; Jim Kane – bass; Tom Murray – drums, percussion; Mark Gallagher – lead vocals; Ray Melina – lead guitar, backing and lead vocals
1970	Late 1970 – 1971	1971 – 1972	1972 – 1990
Dan Rinaldi – rhythm guitar, backing vocals; Jim Kane – bass; Tom Murray – drums, percussion; Mark Gallagher – lead vocals; Sean Jones – lead guitar	Dan Rinaldi – rhythm guitar, backing vocals; Tom Murray – drums, percussion; Mark Gallagher – lead vocals; Sean Jones – lead guitar; John Sutphen – bass	Dan Rinaldi – rhythm guitar, backing vocals; Tom Murray – drums, percussion; Casey McPhearson – lead vocals; John King – lead guitar; Mike Rowe – bass	Disbanded
1990	1991	1993 – 1998	1998 – August 1999
Denny Waite – lead vocals, organ, synthesizer, harmonica; Tom "Zippy" Kaplan – lead guitar, backing vocals, special effects; Dan Rinaldi – rhythm guitar, backing vocals; Tom Murray – drums, percussion; Woody Woodrich – bass	Tom "Zippy" Kaplan – lead guitar; Dan Rinaldi – rhythm guitar; Tom Murray – drums, percussion; Mark Gallagher – lead vocals; Bob Hood – keyboards, backing vocals, rhythm guitar; Rick Ottum – bass, backing vocals; Studio contributors: Mick Stanhope – lead vocals; Denny Waite – harmonica, backing vocals, synthesizer	Disbanded	Denny Waite – lead vocals, organ, synthesizer, harmonica; Tom "Zippy" Kaplan – lead guitar, backing vocals, special effects; Dan Rinaldi – rhythm guitar, backing vocals; Bill Grenke – bass; John Haga – drums, percussion
August 1999 – Present
Denny Waite – lead vocals, organ, synthesizer, harmonica; Tom "Zippy" Kaplan – lead guitar, backing vocals, special effects; Dan Rinaldi – rhythm guitar, backing vocals; Bill Grenke – bass; Joe Scanlan – drums, percussion

== Discography ==
=== Singles ===
- "Action Woman" b/w "A Legal Matter" (Scotty 803G-6710) January 1967
- "Somebody Help Me" b/w "I'm a Man" (Warick 9445–6711) 1967
- "Action Woman" b/w "Whatcha Gonna Do About It" (Warick 6712) 1967
- "Silly People" b/w "Feeling" (Probe 461) 1968
- "Blue Ice" b/w "On Our Minds" (Probe 467) 1969

=== Albums ===
- Distortions (Warick WM-671-A) 1967
- $100 Fine (Hexagon 681-S) 1968
- Emerge (Probe 4504-S) 1968
- Re-Emerge (Arf! Arf! AA-080) 1999

=== Compilation appearances ===
- Rare Tracks (Eva 12013) 1983
- "Action Woman":
  - Pebbles, Volume 1 (LP-1979; CD-1992)
  - Songs We Taught the Fuzztones (1993)
  - Nuggets: Original Artyfacts from the First Psychedelic Era, 1965-1968 — Box Set (1998)
  - Garage Rock Classics (2004)
  - Trash Box (5-CD box set)
- "I'm A Man":
  - Pebbles, Volume 2 (LP)
  - Pebbles, Volume 3 (CD – ESD Records)
- "Hey Joe":
  - The Scotty Story (CD)
- "7 Up Commercial":
  - The Scotty Story (CD)

=== Live albums ===
- Live at Mirage 1990 (Arf! Arf! AA-79) 1998
