= Electric Theatre =

Theatre in Guildford, England

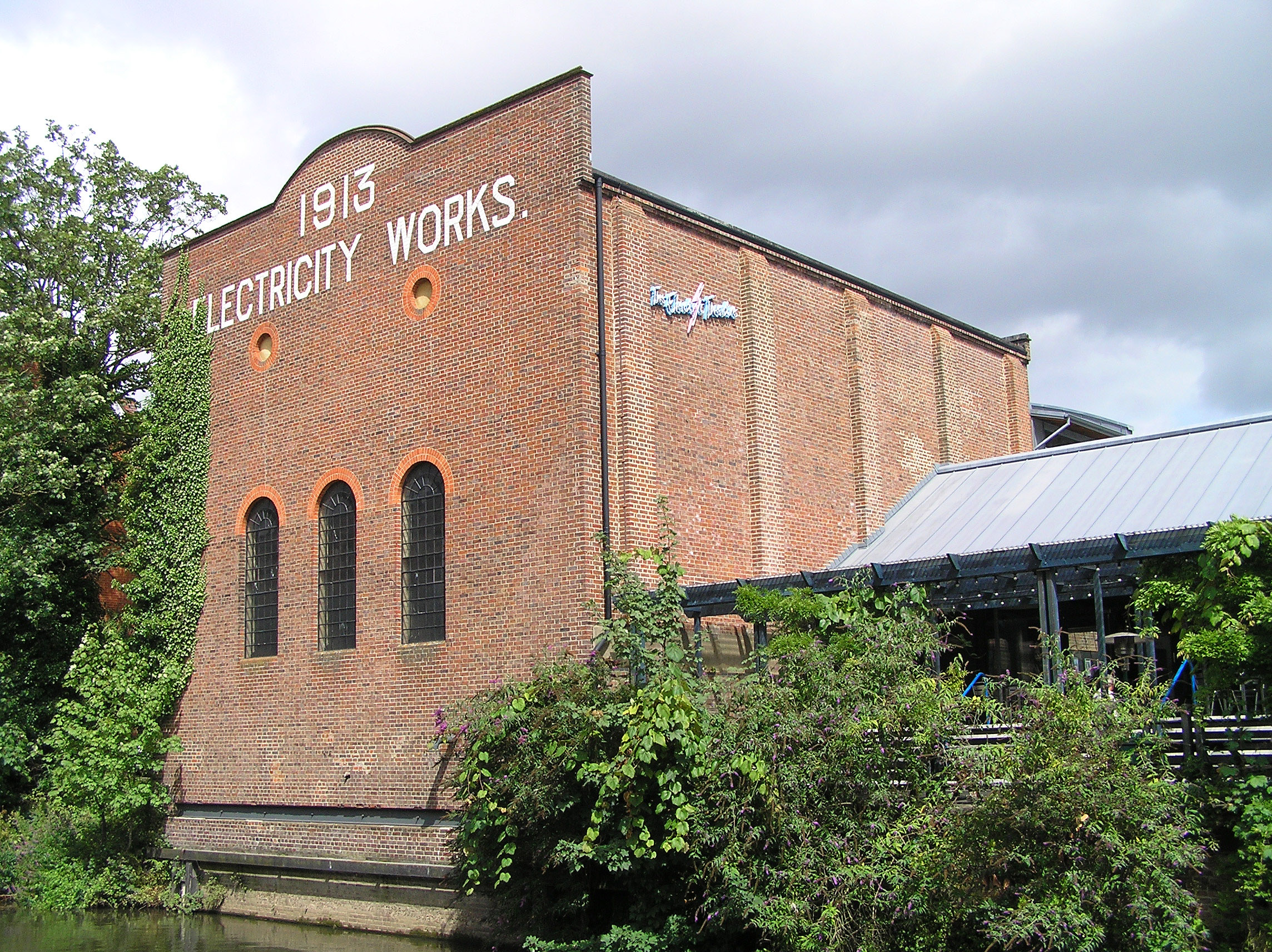
- The Electric Theatre, viewed from across the River Wey

- Location in Surrey
- Address: Onslow Street
- Location: Guildford
- Coordinates: 51°14′10″N 0°34′39″W
- Owner: Guildford Borough Council
- Operator: Academy of Contemporary Music
- Type: Theatre
- Public transit: Close to Guildford bus station & Guildford railway station

Construction
- Built: 1913 as power station
- Opened: 1997 as theatre

Website
- www.electric.theatre

The Electric Theatre is a theatre located in Guildford, Surrey, England, which has gained a widespread reputation for promotion of the musical arts at all levels, from community workshops to concerts by internationally well-known artists.

The theatre is housed in a former electricity works, which used to provide power to Guildford town centre. The works lay dormant from 1968 until the building's potential as a theatre was recognised; 1997 saw the opening of The Electric Theatre in the converted premises.

The guitarist Eric Roche recorded a live DVD at the Electric Theatre in May 2003.

In 2008, a Family Festival in conjunction with the Prince of Wales' "Prince's Foundation for Children and the Arts" took place. Prior to the ACM takeover, the annual Film Festivals showed a variety of classic, arthouse, and world cinema. Following the takeover, the film festival initially showed more mainstream films before ceasing to run.

In 2017, the Guildford-based Academy of Contemporary Music signed a 20-year lease with Guildford Borough Council to operate The Electric Theatre. The Electric Theatre had become a major regional attraction, hosting a youth theatre and hosting events including the annual Guildford Book Festival and the International Music Festival.

The Electric Theatre has hosted numerous concerts by Folk and acoustic musical acts. These concerts continue under the "Electric Voices" brand and include acts such as Dick Gaughan, the Copper Family, Ashley Hutchings, Bill Caddick, and Coope Boyes and Simpson.
