= No More Hot Dogs =

Song by Hasil Adkins
- Released: c. 1955
- Genre: Rockabilly protopunk
- Length: 2:05
- Songwriter: Hasil Adkins

Audio sample
- No More Hot Dogs: file; help

"No More Hot Dogs" is a rockabilly song by Hasil Adkins. The track was originally recorded around 1955 in mono. Adkins plays all of his own instruments and the track includes his acoustic Gibson guitar and a stripped-down drumkit.

"No More Hot Dogs" begins with Adkins maniacally laughing. In the track, he sings about how he is going to decapitate his girlfriend and mount her head on his wall so she won't eat any more hot dogs. He sings that he is going to cut off her head at "half past eight" and have it hanging on his wall at "half past ten".

Adkins described the inspiration for the song being a double date he went on to a drive-in as a teenager in the 1950s. According to him,

"This fellow took his girlfriend out and I took mine out, stopped at a drive-in. We didn't really have no money to buy anything. Hotdog was just 10 cents. So he figured and I did too that the girls would eat dinner before we picked them up. Pulled in and his girlfriend said 'Well, I'll have a couple of hotdogs and a Coke.' And the way he looked at her, he could have cut her head off. 'Cause he didn't have maybe 70 or 80 cents on him. And I didn't have maybe 40, 50 cents. And that's where I got that song from, the way he looked at her."

In an interview, Adkins later related "I gotta bunch more scary songs in my mind that I'm gonna record. I really made up 'No More Hot Dogs' for little kids." According to him, patrons of beer joints would pay him up to $50 to not play the song.

Reviews of "No More Hot Dogs" typically remark on the macabre subject matter and Adkins' unsettling laughter on the track. LA Weekly described the song as "schizophrenic" while The Commercial Appeal declared that it was a "paean to lunacy".

Adkins' music was rediscovered by The Cramps drummer Miriam Linna in the early 1980s. His music was identified as a predecessor of psychobilly and featured in an article in her New York-based zine Kicks. Linna's record label Norton Records released a compilation of Adkins' songs with the 1986 album Out to Hunch, which included songs that Adkins recorded between 1955 and 1965. "No More Hot Dogs" was the second song on the album. "No More Hot Dogs" was one of many songs Adkins wrote dealing with themes of meat and decapitation. The album Out to Hunch also included the hot dog-themed song, "Hot Dog Baby". A review in AllMusic concluded that "after listening to it, hot dogs will never seem quite the same again."

The song was used in Robert Rodriguez's 1994 film Roadracers. The song can also be heard in the 1994 television series Rebel Highway, the 2009 film White Lightnin', and the 2021 episode of The Simpsons, "A Serious Flanders".
