= Out to Hunch =

Compilation album by Hasil Adkins
- Released: 1986
- Recorded: 1955–1965
- Genre: Rockabilly; psychobilly; proto-punk; horror punk; outsider
- Length: 39:16
- Label: Norton
- Producer: Billy Miller

Hasil Adkins chronology
He Said (1985)	Out to Hunch (1986)	The Wild Man (1987)

Professional ratings
Review scores
Source	Rating
AllMusic	4.5/5 stars

Out to Hunch is the second album by American rockabilly musician Hasil Adkins, released in 1986 by Norton Records. The compilation consists of various rockabilly songs Adkins recorded on reel-to-reel tape between 1955 and 1965.

== Background ==
Nicknamed "The Haze", Adkins career began in the mid-1950s in an improvised studio in his home near Madison, West Virginia, beginning with the track "I'm Happy". His influences consist of Elvis Presley and Jerry Lee Lewis. In a later interview he exclaimed "I couldn't afford no drums so I just stomped my feet." He eventually learned to use percussive instruments to accompany his guitar and vocals, which would become his hallmark sound.

In this period where the songs from Out to Hunch were recorded, Adkins received little attention and success, with his first release being in the mid-1960s when a local micro-label released the 45 rpm record Chicken Walk / She's Mine.

== Content ==
"No More Hot Dogs"
"No More Hot Dogs" was recorded in Adkins home studio in 1955 and released by Norton Records in 1986. Its rockabilly roots mixed with unhinged lyrics and low-fi production laid the foundation for the psychobilly genre.

Adkins' style was considered an innovation to psychobilly, having an unusual and lo-fi take in the rockabilly genre and being explicit in lyrical content. Common themes in Adkins' catalogue included sex, heartbreak, decapitation, aliens, hot dogs and poultry. The most notable track of Out to Hunch is "No More Hot Dogs", a song about decapitating a girlfriend and keeping her head as a wall mount.

== Track listing ==
All tracks are written by Hasil Adkins.

No.	Title	Length
1.	"She Said"	2:48
2.	"No More Hot Dogs"	2:07
3.	"Ha Ha Cat Walk Baby"	1:53
4.	"Rockin' Robin"	2:29
5.	"Chicken Walk"	1:53
6.	"I'm Happy"	2:34
7.	"Can't Help It Blues"	2:17
8.	"We Got a Date"	2:42
9.	"High School Confidential"	2:40
10.	"Let Me Come In"	2:20
11.	"The Hunch"	2:48
12.	"Gee But I Love You"	2:19
13.	"Memphis"	2:55
14.	"Do It to Me Night"	2:40
15.	"Truly Ruly"	2:27
16.	"I Need Your Head (...This Ain't No Rock N' Roll Show)"	2:24
Total length:		39:16
