= Singwango Secondary School =

School in Zimbabwe

Coordinates: 20°46′51″S 29°19′11″E

Location
- Filabusi, Matabeleland South Province; Zimbabwe

Information
- School type: Secondary school
- Sister school: Carle Place High School (formerly)

Singwango Secondary School is located in Filabusi, Matabeleland South Province, Zimbabwe. It had a sister school in Carle Place, New York, United States, although Carle Place High School still donates sports equipment and clothes.
