= Soul Sanctuary =

Soul Sanctuary

- Soul Sanctuary Church in Winnipeg Fresh I.E.
- Soul Sanctuary magazine Figures of Light
- Soul Sanctuary (Hollywood Blue Flames, 2005) Larry Taylor
- "Soul Sanctuary" Emancipation (Prince album)
