= Figures of Light =

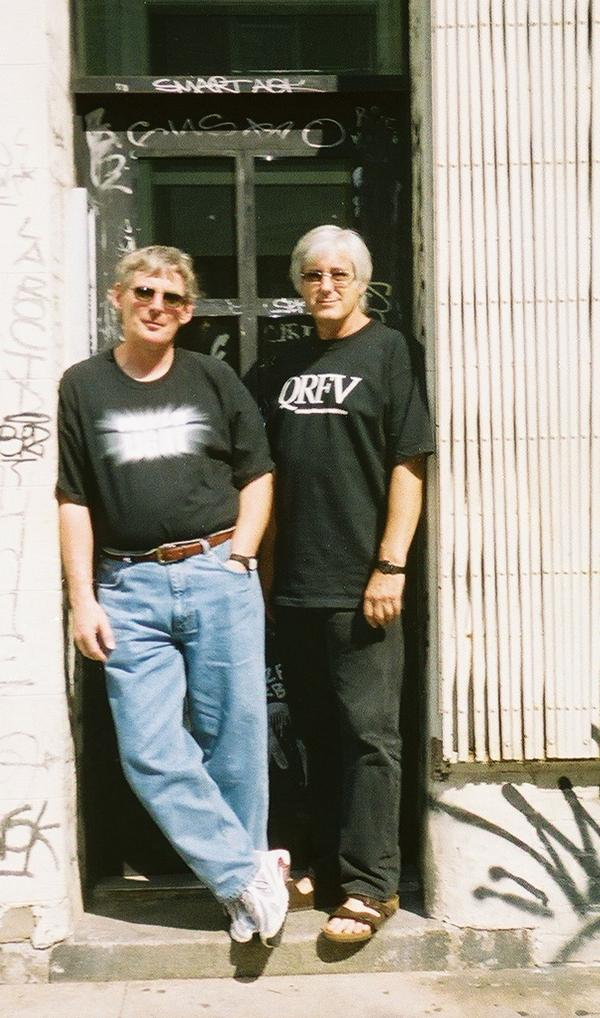
- Dixon and Downey in 2012.

Background information
- Origin: New Brunswick, New Jersey, US
- Genre: Proto-punk
- Years active: 1970–1972; 2006–2015
- Label: Norton
- Members: Wheeler Winston Dixon; Michael Downey
- Past members: Phil Cohen; Dennis Druzbik

Figures of Light is an American proto-punk band formed in 1970 by Wheeler Winston Dixon (lead vocals, slide guitar) and Michael Downey (rhythm guitar, backing vocals).

== History ==
=== Origins (1970–1972) ===
At the time of the band's formation, Dixon, 20, and Downey, 23, were roommates, and the band, which at the time included Phil Cohen (lead guitar) and Dennis Druzbik (bass), rehearsed in their apartment in New Brunswick, New Jersey. Guitarist William Spaceman Patterson jammed with the band during their early practice sessions, though he never performed or recorded with the group. They were influenced by the Velvet Underground, the Stooges, and other pre-punk bands of that era. In 1972, Figures of Light cut their debut 7" single, "It's Lame", with a limited pressing of 100. The single has since been called "raw, loud, and nothing like the prevailing music of the time." The band was unable to get a record deal, which led to its dissolution later that year.

At their debut live performance, at Rutgers University in 1970, band members smashed 15 television sets and "a bunch of mirrors" with axes and sledgehammers. They also drove a motorcycle down the main aisle of the concert hall and destroyed a record player. Dixon has called it a protest against the Vietnam War and the way it was being presented on television. The band performed regularly from 1970 until their breakup in 1972.

=== Reunion (2006–2015) ===
In 2006, Norton Records founders Billy Miller and Miriam Linna discovered and re-released the "It's Lame" single, prompting Figures of Light to reunite. At the time, Dixon and Downey hadn't spoken in around 25 years. The band's newly recorded material was combined with early in-studio and live tracks for their first full-length release, Smash Hits (2008). They followed that up with Drop Dead, recorded in Brooklyn in 2011. Dixon and Downey were joined on the album by Linna (of the Cramps and the A-Bones), Mick Collins (of the Gories and the Dirtbombs) and Marcus "The Carcass" Natale (of the A-Bones). Collins produced the album, which has a raw, reverb-saturated, stripped down sound. "It's Lame" was later included on the 2009 compilation I Still Hate CD's: Norton Records 45 RPM Singles Collection Vol. 2. Dixon explained his approach:

Keep it simple, two chords max, simple lyrics, but with content. We're purveyors of cheerful nihilism. Make an impact, keep it short, say what you want, and get out.

— Wheeler Winston Dixon in Soul Sanctuary magazine 2014

The band broke up amicably in March 2015; with Dixon stating that "we've done everything we want to do with FOL; now it's time to move on." A permanent archive of FOL videos is on YouTube; their music is still available on Amazon, iTunes, Spotify and other content providers. Despite the band's formal breakup, they continue to release new recordings, and are now a studio band.

== Discography ==
=== Albums ===
- Smash Hits (Norton Records, August 12, 2008)
- Drop Dead (Norton Records, November 13, 2011)
- Lost & Found (FOL Records, August 15, 2013)
- The TV Smashing Concert, July 23rd 1970 (recorded 1970, released by Norton Records, 2013)
- Feedback Music (FOL Records, February 5, 2014)

=== Extended plays ===
- Too Many Bills, Not Enough Thrills (FOL Records, June 15, 2013)
- Gimme A Quarter (FOL Records, August 21, 2013)
- The Power (FOL Records, September 9, 2013)
- Great! Now We Have Time to Party! (FOL Records, September 26, 2013)
- The Open Door (FOL Records, November 8, 2013)
- Leave Her Alone (FOL Records, November 22, 2013)
- Buy Before You Die (FOL Records, February 7, 2014)
- The Nebraska Sessions (FOL Records, July 31, 2014)
- R U Ready? (FOL Records, July 19, 2015)
- Maximum (FOL Records, September 2, 2016)
- Blanc et Noir (FOL Records, September 30, 2016)
- Funny You Asked (FOL Records, July 5, 2023)

=== Singles ===
- "It's Lame" b/w "I Jes Wanna Go to Bed" (Midnite Swan, 1972; re-released by Norton Records, 2006)
- "Five Years Later" (FOL Records, June 24, 2014)
- "Instant Drone" (FOL Records, October 23, 2014)
- "You Better Wise Up" (Instrumental Version) (FOL Records, February 22, 2016)
- "Boiling Point!" (FOL Records, October 13, 2016)
- "Surfin' the Skies" (FOL Records, February 3, 2017)
- "Got It!" (FOL Records, March 5, 2017)
- "Quixotic" (FOL Records, September 2, 2017)
- "Rumbling" (FOL Records, December 18, 2017)
- "Midlife Crisis" (FOL Records, June 18, 2018)
- "Breaking Through" (FOL Records, January 12, 2019)
- "Fire and Ice" (FOL Records, January 25, 2019)
- "Surf's Up Again!" (FOL Records, March 20, 2019)
- "Compression" (FOL Records, April 6, 2019)
- "Rock 'n Roll" (FOL Records, January 23, 2020)
- "We Ain't Goin' To Paris" (FOL Records, April 5, 2020)
- "Rude Awakening" (FOL Records, August 12, 2020)
- "Good Riddance 2021" (FOL Records, December 31, 2021)
- "Storm Warning" (FOL Records, August 31, 2022)
- "Zut Alors!" (FOL Records, February 12, 2023)
- "Propinquity" (FOL Records, November 15, 2025)

=== Compilations ===
- "It's Lame", I Still Hate CD's: Norton Records 45 RPM Singles Collection Vol. 2 (Norton Records, June 2, 2009)
- "World of Pain", World of Pain: 20 Pounders, Vol. 2 (Norton Records, November 12, 2013)
- Figures of Light: Greatest Hits (FOL Records, September 3, 2014)
- The Instrumentals (FOL Records, December 20, 2015)

== Gallery ==
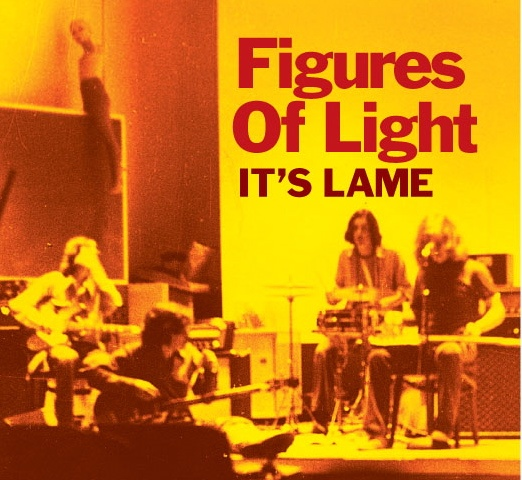
Cover of 45 single "It's Lame"

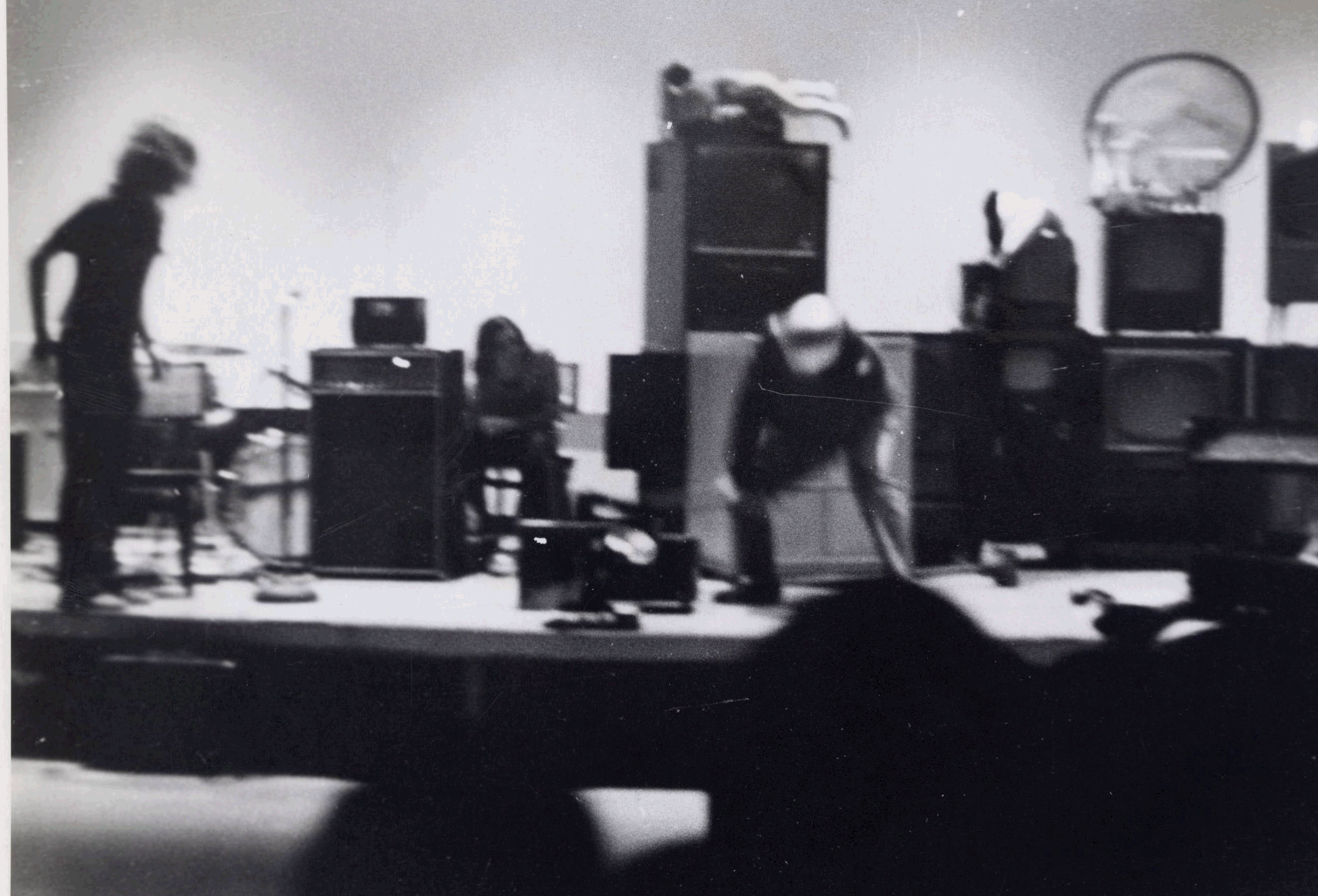
A record player axed during concert

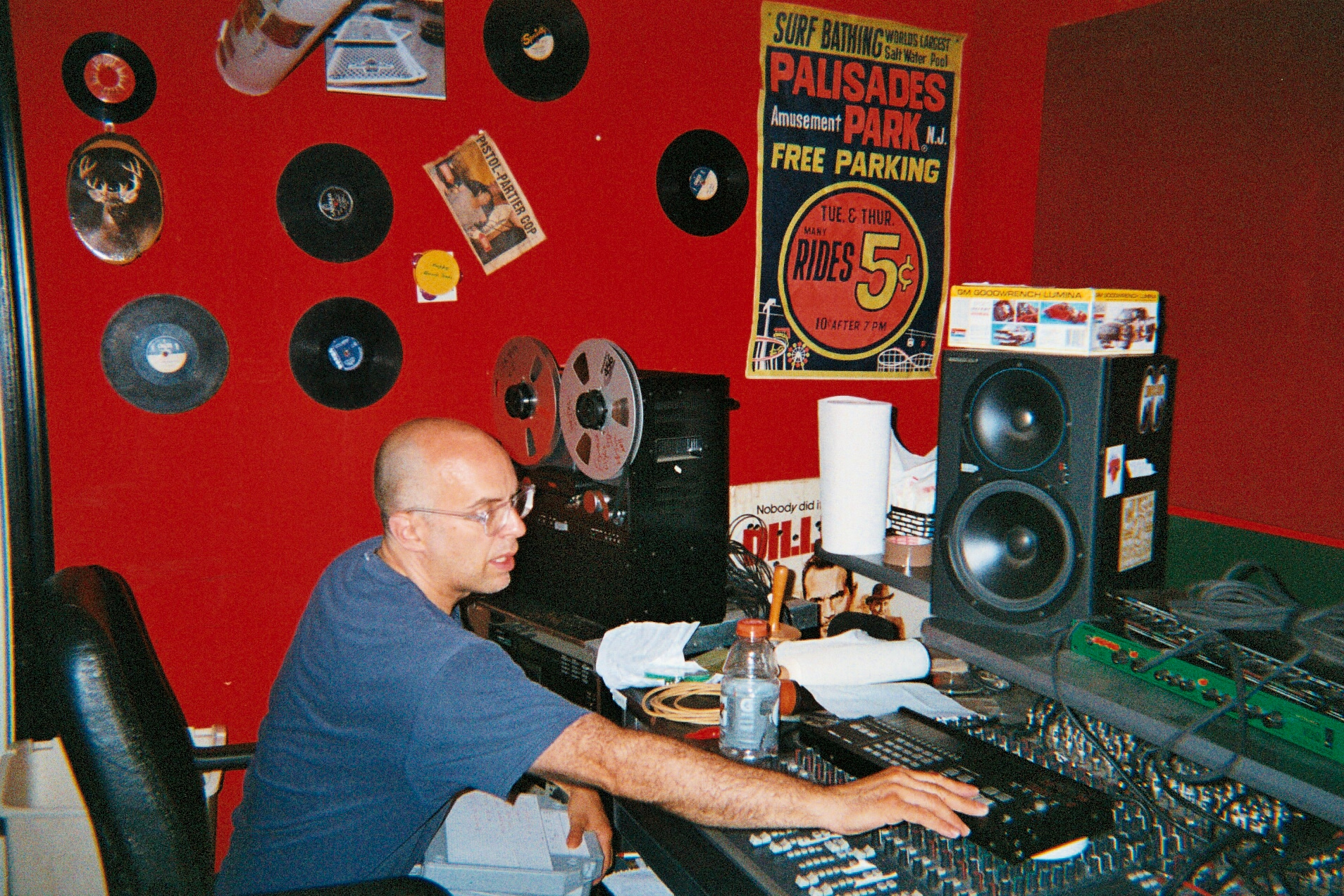
Mitro at the board

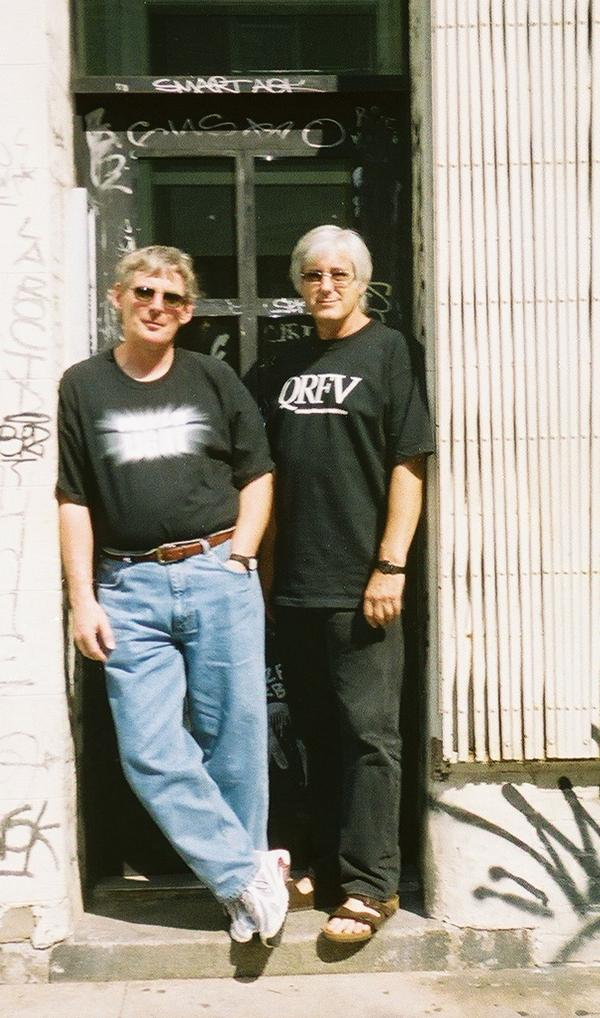
Dixon and Downey

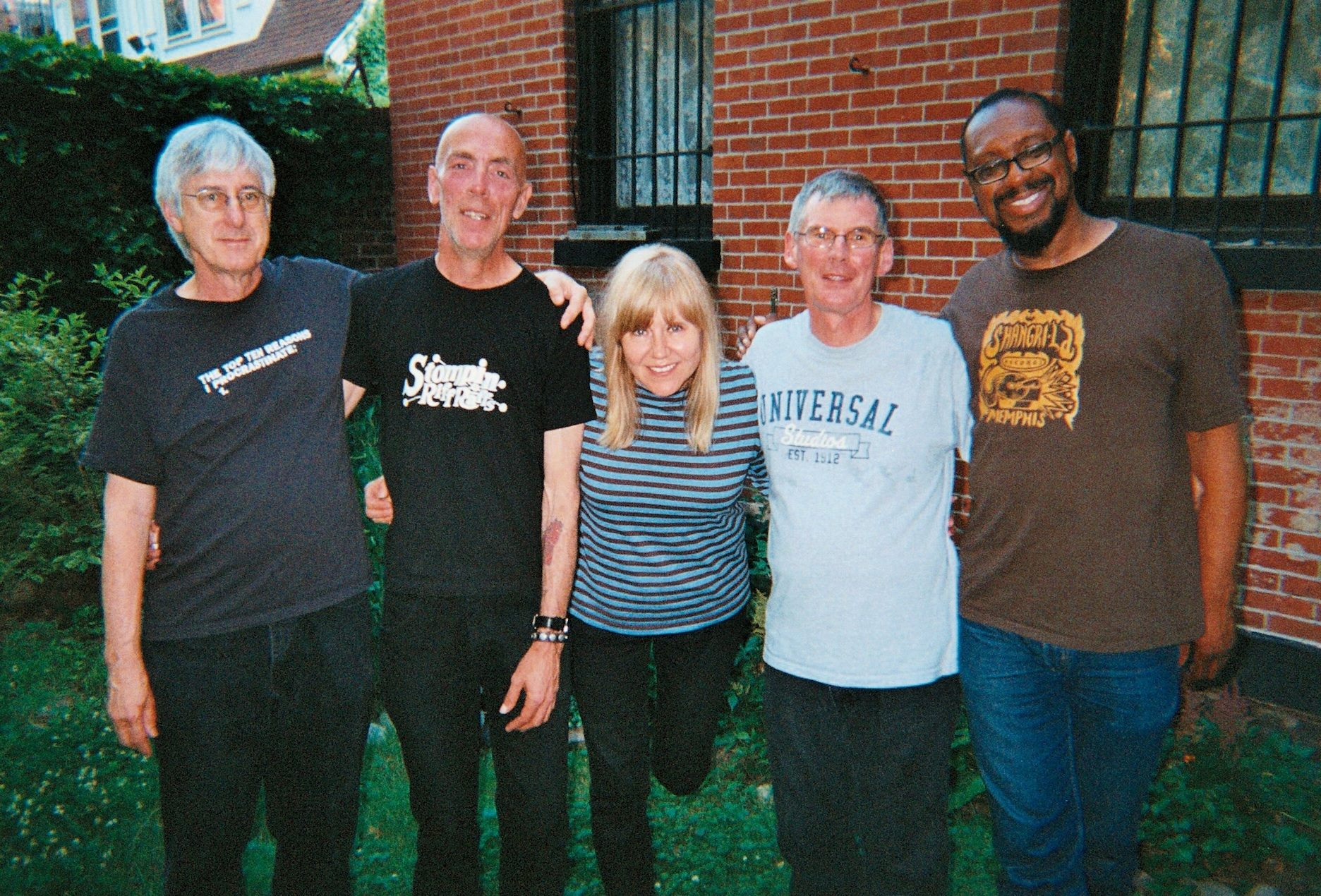
2011. L to R: Downey, Natale, Linna, Dixon, Collins.

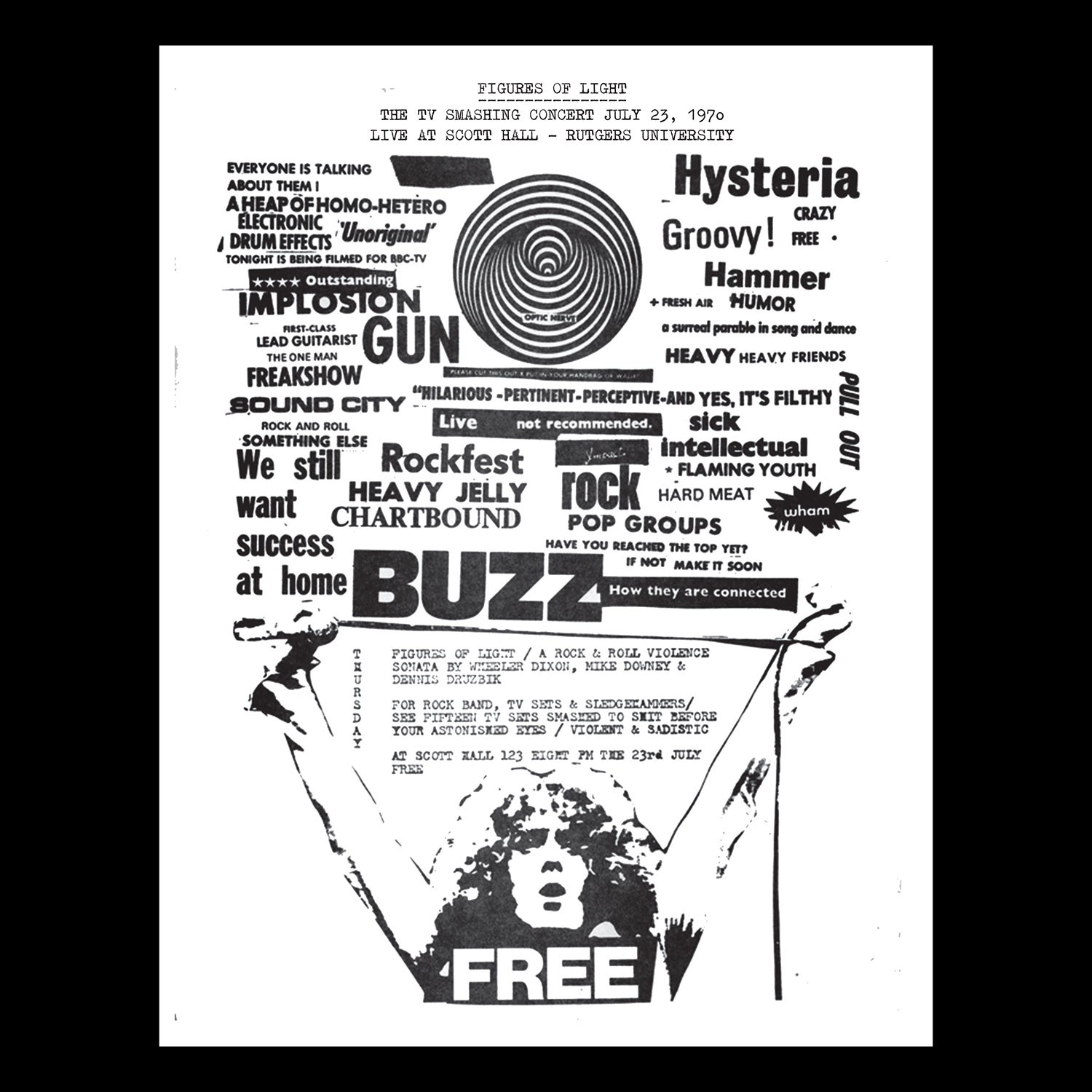
Concert poster, 1970
