= Carle Place Union Free School District =

School district in the U.S. state of New York

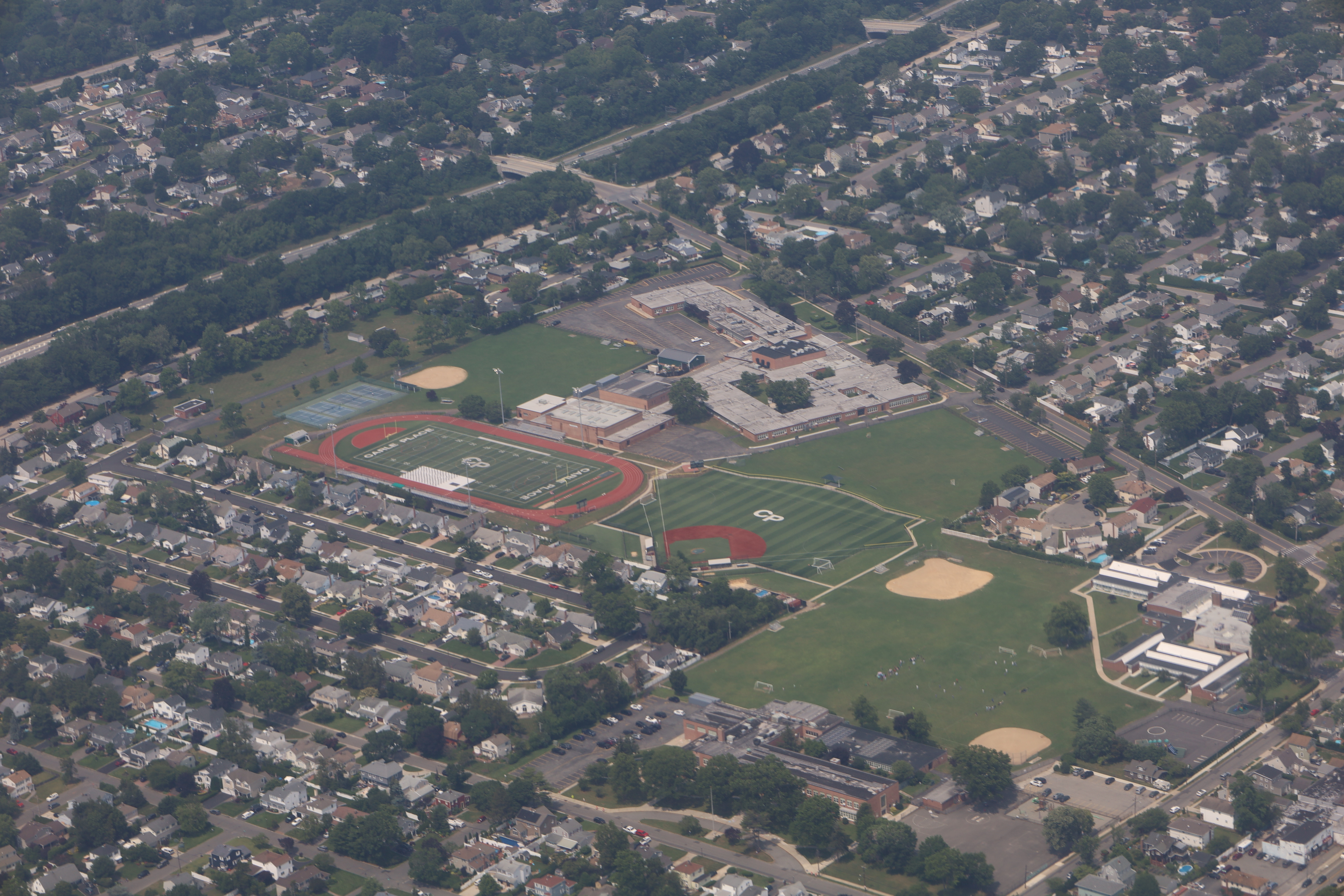
- The Carle Place UFSD's campus from the air in 2021.

Location
- Carle Place, NY 11514 United States

District information
- Type: Public Schools
- Grades: K–12
- Established: 1915
- Superintendent: Dr. Christine Finn
- Asst. superintendent(s): Eileen Fredericks
- Schools: 3
- Budget: $44,646,051 (2010–11)

Students and staff
- Students: 1,462 (2009–10)
- Teachers: 151 (2009–10)
- Staff: 221 (2009–10)
- Student–teacher ratio: 9.68 (2009–10)
- District mascot: Frog
- Colors: Green and White

Other information
- Website: www.cps.k12.ny.us

The Carle Place Union Free School District is a school district that serves all of Carle Place and parts of Westbury and Mineola in central Nassau County, Long Island, New York, United States.

== Schools ==
=== Cherry Lane School ===
Cherry Lane Primary School is a three-year comprehensive public primary school located in the hamlet of Carle Place in Nassau County, New York. The school runs grades K–2.

=== Rushmore Avenue School ===
Rushmore Avenue Elementary School is a four-year comprehensive public elementary school located in the hamlet of Carle Place in Nassau County, New York. The school is for grades 3–6, whose 6th grade runs a middle school type process for getting around classes.

=== Carle Place Middle/High School ===
Carle Place Middle/High School is a six-year comprehensive public high school located in the hamlet of Carle Place in Nassau County, New York. Its Middle School runs grades 7–8 and High School runs grades 9–12.

== Notable alumni ==
- Joe Satriani – Guitar virtuoso and instrumentalist. Lead guitarist for Chickenfoot. Played with Deep Purple, Mick Jagger, etc.
- Steve Serio – Paralympic wheelchair basketball player.
- Matt Snell – Former pro football player for the New York Jets.
- Steve Vai – Guitar virtuoso who was one of Joe Satriani's students.
