= Saint Mary's Chapel (Carle Place, New York) =

Historic church in New York, United States

- Saint Mary's Episcopal Church
- U.S. National Register of Historic Places
- New York State Register of Historic Places
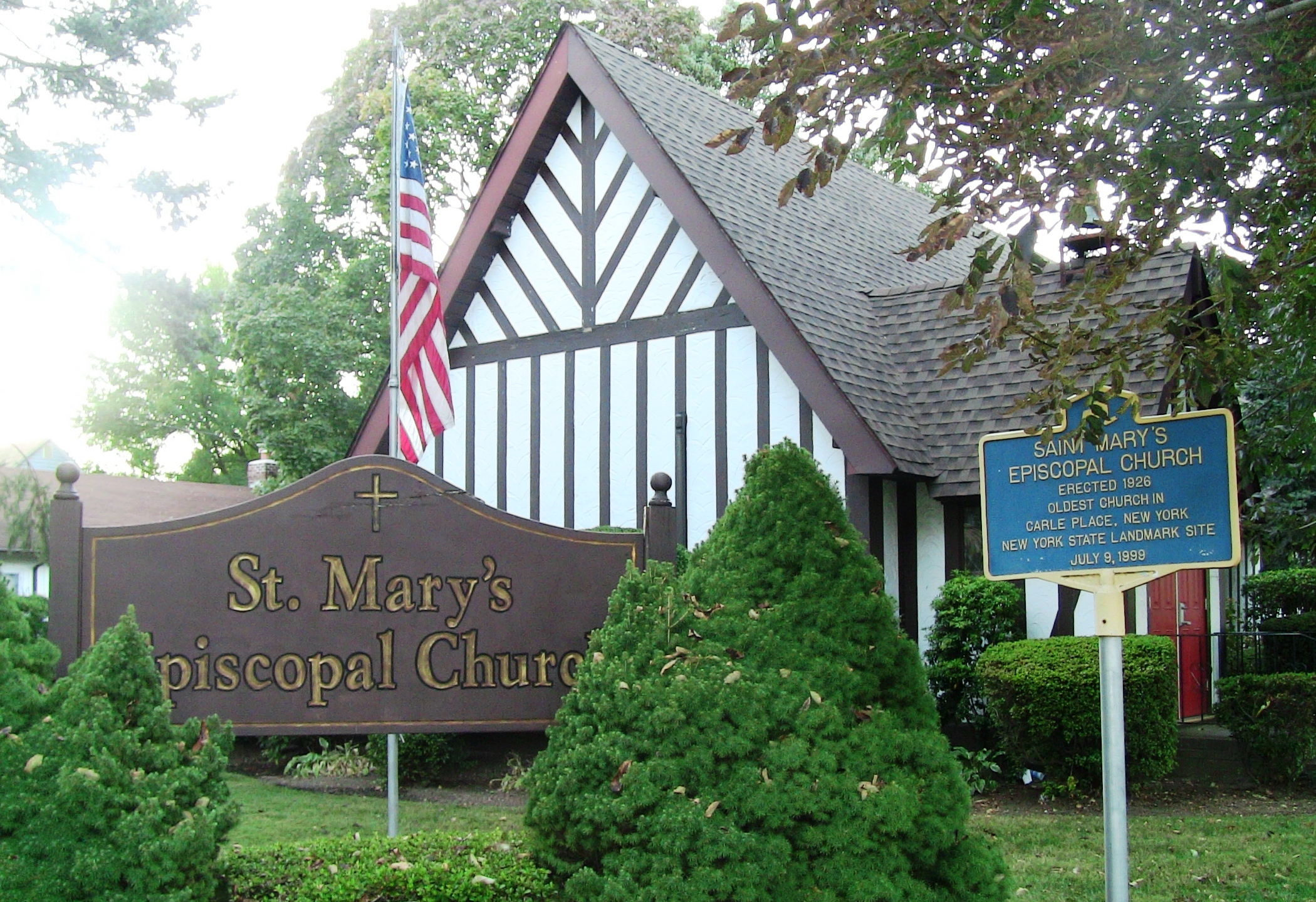

- Location within New York Location within the United States
- Location: Rushmore Ave. bet Roslyn Ave. and Glen Cove Ave., Carle Place, New York
- Coordinates: 40°45′4″N 73°36′35″W
- NRHP reference No.: 05000270
- Designated NYSRHP: July 9, 1999

Saint Mary's Chapel, also known as Saint Mary's Episcopal Church, is a historic Episcopal church located on Rushmore Avenue between Roslyn Avenue and Glen Cove Avenue in Carle Place, in Nassau County, New York, United States.

== Description ==
St. Mary's Chapel was built in 1926, and is a one-story, rectangular, Tudor Revival style church building. It has a steeply pitched gable roof and low eaves. It features half-timbering on the stucco exterior and a small projecting vestibule.

It was added to the New York State Register of Historic Places in 1999, and thence also to the National Register of Historic Places in 2005.

== See also ==
- National Register of Historic Places listings in North Hempstead (town), New York
- Cathedral of the Incarnation (Garden City, New York)
