= Sweets and Other Stories =

Book by Andre Williams

- Author: Andre Williams
- Illustrator: Patrick Broderick / Rotodesign
- Language: English
- Series: Kicks Book Original
- Genre: Novel
- Publisher: Kicks Books, Norton Records
- Publication date: November 14, 2009
- Publication place: United States
- Media type: Print (paperback)
- Pages: 103 pp
- ISBN: 978-0-9659777-2-2

Sweets and Other Stories is the 2009 debut novel by soul singer Andre Williams. It features an introduction by author Nick Tosches and an editor's note by Miriam Linna of Kicks Books.

== Background ==
Since the 1950s Williams has been a singer, songwriter and producer. He recorded for Fortune Records and did work with Motown Records.

He is best known for his sleazy R&B singles - "Jail Bait" and "Bacon Fat." He also co-wrote The Five Du-Tones' 1963 hit "Shake a Tail Feather".

== Sweets ==
Prior to starting this novel, during a bout of depression, Williams entered a 42-day program at a drug and alcohol rehabilitation center. A longtime friend, Miriam Linna, suggested that he try his hand at fiction writing to while away the long days ahead at the center. In the book's preface, Williams describes how once in rehab he felt his mind begin to heal and felt a burst of creativity.

He began writing everything down, and with Linna's editorial help, he was able to transform his rehabilitation process into the novelette, short story and song-poems comprising Sweets.

At age 73, Williams had launched his fiction writing career.

In November 2009 Sweets and Other Stories was published – a collection of stories.

Tosches wrote in his introduction to Sweets: "Andre Williams has proven himself to be a survivor. The stories he has here written deserve to survive as well. They most certainly deserve to be read, as the rewards they offer are many and fine. Heed what I say. Otherwise you got nobody but your own self to blame."

The book is a paperback originals release by the Kicks Books imprint which hatched from Norton Records and Kicks Magazine, now celebrating its 30th anniversary. The book design is a homage to vintage PBO paperback originals. Its "tall" 7-inch format, fitting easily in a coat pocket.

Kicks Books celebrated the release of Sweets on November 14, 2009 at a book reading and signing at Phyllis' Musical Inn. There was also a Q&A session with Williams and a DJ party featuring Andre Williams' music selected and spun by DJ John Phillips.

== Characters and story ==
Sweets is a narrative novelette which takes readers for a wild ride from Chicago to Houston, New Orleans, and New York City, as a teenage girl finds herself in a family way, without a family. Forced to fend for herself, she is taken under the wing of a local pimp who entices her into prostitution. The adventures that follow are a free-for-all foray through the fantastic world of pimps and their women, funeral directors, gangs and drug running, with sidebar anecdotes that are guaranteed to appall, alarm and astonish. Extreme entries remained unedited, and none of William's raw drawl storytelling style has been tampered in this standout fiction debut.

== Sources ==
- Bookbeat
- Morning News
- Alabamalama blog
- Dusty Groove
