= Esquerita =

American musician

- Esquerita ca. 1958 in Capitol studio Hollywood

Background information
- Also known as: S.Q. Reeder; Stephen Quincy Reeder; SQ Jr.; The Magnificent Malochi
- Born: Eskew Reeder, Jr. November 20, 1935 or 1938; Greenville, South Carolina, United States
- Died: October 23, 1986 Harlem, New York, United States
- Genre: R&B
- Occupations: Singer; songwriter; pianist
- Instrument: Piano
- Years active: 1950s–1980s

Eskew Reeder, Jr. (November 20, 1935 or 1938 – October 23, 1986), usually known by the stage name Esquerita (/ˈɛskəritə/), and occasionally as S.Q. Reeder or The Magnificent Malochi, was an American R&B singer, songwriter and pianist, known for his frenetic performances. He has been credited with influencing rock and roll pioneer Little Richard.

== Early life ==
A native of Greenville, South Carolina, he was the son of Elizabeth and Eskew Reeder, and attended Sterling High School in Greenville from 1947 to 1950. Though most reliable sources give his birth name as Eskew Reeder, Jr., some give the name Stephen Quincy Reeder. Although most sources give the year of his birth as 1935, other reliable sources, and his social security records, state 1938.

== Career ==
=== 1950s–1960s ===
Reeder was a self-taught piano player whose roots were in gospel music. His music career started as a teenager, when he dropped out of high school and joined the gospel group Heavenly Echoes based in New York City. Little is known about Reeder's early career as a secular rock and roll piano player. As Esquerita, he often wore heavy makeup, sunglasses, and two wigs, piling his pompadour high on his head.

Reeder's first solo studio recordings came about when Paul Peek got him to record some demos at a Greenville radio station (WESC) around 1958. At that time, Peek was a member of the rockabilly group The Blue Caps, led by manic performer Gene Vincent. Peek even co-wrote "The Rock-Around" with Reeder, and Reeder played piano on the 1958 recording that launched the NRC (National Recording Corporation) label. From these contacts and Paul Peek's influence with Capitol Records came a record contract for Reeder; Cub Koda described the results as "some of the most untamed and unabashed sides ever issued by a major label." At this point, Eskew Reeder, Jr. adopted the stage name Esquerita.

The ensuing years found Reeder cutting several singles with various backing musicians in studios in Nashville, Dallas, New Orleans and Detroit. Capitol Records released the LP Esquerita in 1959, his only album in the traditional sense (that is, not a compilation of earlier singles, or re-issues). In 1962, he cut an iconic cover of the 1956 hit “Green Door”. Musicians he recorded with during this era included Jimi Hendrix, Dr. John, Allen Toussaint, and The Jordanaires (Elvis Presley's backup singers). His best-known songs from this time include "Hey Miss Lucy", "Get Back Baby", "Gettin' Plenty Lovin'", "Rockin’ the Joint", and "Oh Baby". In 1963, he recorded a session for Berry Gordy's Motown Records but those recordings were never released. Around 1964, he performed with Little Richard and Jimi Hendrix for Little Richard's Greatest Hits album. In late 1967, Reeder changed his name to Magnificent Malochi and signed with Brunswick Records. In 1968, for that label, he co-wrote Little Richard's adaptation of Bessie Smith's 1936 “I got what it takes“, as “Stingy Jenny (Got what it takes but it breaks my heart to give it away)”.

=== 1970s–1980s ===
Esquerita started the 1970s in a positive way, contributing “Dew Drop Inn” and a co-write on “Freedom Blues”, to Little Richard's acclaimed comeback album for Reprise Records, The Rill Thing. Both tunes did well as Richard's first top 40 Soul and Top 50 Pop hit since the 1950s, “Freedom Blues”, the A-side. He played keyboards on "Takin' Care Of Business" by John Hammond in 1970. Shortly after this, he began to fade from the music scene, but Linda Hopkins released a song written by Reeder called "Seven Days and Seven Nights" in 1973. Around this time, Esquerita formed a new group, consisting of Charles Neville (the saxophone player of The Neville Brothers), who then resided in Brooklyn, New York, and drummer Jerry Katz of Queens, New York. They and a few other musicians played a steady gig at Tommy Smalls Night Club on 50th Street and 8th Avenue in New York City. Several months later the group disbanded. He gained notoriety but his own hit was still a dream.

According to an interview with Billy Miller and Miriam Linna in the ReSearch book Incredibly Strange Music, Reeder occasionally performed at African-American gay clubs under the name Fabulash during the 1970s. He was eventually tracked down by a writer for Kicks Magazine in 1983 or 1984, who found him performing in second-rate New York City clubs. On October 17, 1984, Esquerita made an appearance with Little Richard, at the Red Parrott disco, in Manhattan, New York, at the Crown Publishing book launch for the biography written by BBC's Charles “Dr. Rock” White and Richard, The Life and Times of Little Richard, covered by NBC TV, who captured an impromptu “Thank You, Jesus”, Richard singing and Esquerita playing. According to an article ("Who Was Esquerita?") by music historian Johnny Carter in an international oldies magazine, music maven Bill Lowery (who originated National Recording Corporation and was involved in the Peek sessions for NRC) was approached by Esquerita on the street in New York in 1985 after a conference at Broadcast Music, Inc. Lowery confirmed that Esquerita was down on his luck and was working as a parking lot attendant but was still as flamboyant as ever.

== Later years and death ==
A few months before his death he was seen washing car windshields for tips at an intersection in Brooklyn. In this same article, Esquerita's father, Eskew Reeder Sr., said that his son had died of complications brought on by AIDS in 1986. Esquerita's father (who was born on March 25, 1907) died in February 1989, a little over two years after his son's death. Eskew Sr.'s last known residence was Simpsonville, South Carolina.

== Posthumous releases ==
On March 13, 2012, it was announced that Norton Records was releasing a new single and new album by Esquerita entitled Sinner Man: The Lost Session. These were to include unreleased recordings from a session in New York City in June 1966.

== Influence ==
Reeder has been cited as a key early influence on Little Richard; his look and style were in a very similar vein, although Esquerita was much more flamboyant in the 1950s and his music played more wildly than the contemporary music of Little Richard. Reeder did not record until after Little Richard's initial early 1950s recordings for the RCA and Peacock labels and the later hits on Specialty. However, early Little Richard recordings made at WGST Radio Station in Atlanta do not show the style that was to make him famous. According to Richard, Esquerita did influence him and taught him to play the piano. In an interview segment of the South Bank Show documentary in 1988 when the book The Quasar Of Rock was published, Richard states that he saw Esquerita getting off a bus at the Macon, GA Greyhound bus station, but doesn't say which year, presumably in the early 1950s. There's a hint of a sexual connection between the two, but Richard also states that he was inspired by Reeder, and moreover, Reeder was inspired by Richard to go into show business.

Little Richard also had not intended to use what came to be his (and Esquerita's) characteristic style during his first New Orleans session for Specialty Records. The session producer, Robert "Bumps" Blackwell, had been unhappy with Penniman's initial songs on the session, so, taking a break from recording, he went with Richard to a local cafe, where Richard jumped on a piano and began singing an X-rated version of "Tutti Frutti", in true Esquerita fashion. Blackwell felt that a cleaned-up version of the song with the same style of presentation would be just what his boss Art Rupe was looking for, and this song launched Little Richard's career in 1955.

Mick Jones (of The Clash) wrote and recorded a song called "Esquerita" with his band Big Audio Dynamite, which appeared on the group's Tighten Up Vol. 88 album from 1988. Alternative rock band Lyres recorded their own version of Esquerita's song "Gettin' Plenty Lovin'", which was released on Norton Records in 1992.

Esquerita was an influence on zydeco performer Lynn August, who played drums for Esquerita in the early 1960s. At the age of 12, August was playing drums for Fats Junior, who happened to be opening a show for Esquerita, who let August play a couple of songs with him. After Esquerita spoke with August's mom, he was hired as Esquerita's drummer and played with Esquerita for three years, mostly around New Orleans. August said that Esquerita was playing an organ with pedals and only carried a drummer because he was such a great entertainer. Esquerita also encouraged August to take up piano. Lynn August later became known for his accordion playing. When Esquerita left New Orleans around 1963, August joined Jay Nelson's band from Baton Rouge, Louisiana. August later recorded his own version of Esquerita's song "Undivided Love", which appears on his Creole Cruiser album from 1992.

Esquerita was also an influence on Ricky Wilson of the B-52’s, and it inspired part of their sound.

The Adam Ant and Marco Pirroni song "Miss Thing", from their 1985 album Vive Le Rock, was about Esquerita.

== Discography ==
=== Solo singles ===
- "Oh Baby"/"Please Come Home" (Capitol 4007) (1958)
- "Rockin' The Joint"/"Esquerita And The Voola" (Capitol 4058) (1958)
- "Laid Off"/"Just Another Lie" (Capitol 4145) (1959)
- "Hey Miss Lucy"/"Battie Over Hattie" (Capitol 1075) (promo) (1959)
- "Green Door"/"I Waited Too Long" (Minit 648) (1962) (as Eskew Reeder)
- "Never Again"/"We Had Love" (Minit 658) (1962) (as Eskew Reeder)
- "The Flu"/"Undivided Love" (Instant 3258) (1963) (as Eskew Reeder Jr.)
- "I Woke Up This Morning"/"I Woke Up This Morning Part Two" (Instant 3268) (1963) (as Eskew Reeder Jr.)
- "A Tear"/"Johnny Little" (Everest 2025) (1963) (as Eskew Reeder)
- "Stubborn Old Me" (Motown) (1963) (unreleased)
- "I Want To Know"/"Just In Time" (Okeh 7239) (1966) (as S. Q. Reeder)
- "Tell The World About You"/"Two Ton Tessie" (Okeh 7254) (1966) (as S. Q. Reeder)
- "Dew Drop Inn"/"You Better Believe In Me" (Cross-Tone 1007) (1967) (as Eskew "Esque-Rita" Reeder)
- "Mama Your Daddy's Come Home"/"As Time Goes" By (Brunswick 55359) (4/1968) (as Magnificent Malochi)
- "Hey Miss Lucy"/"Hole In My Heart" (Capitol 81382) (Germany) (1973)
- "Hey Miss Lucy"/"Gettin' Plenty Lovin'" (Capitol C006-81-709) (Old Rock New Roll Volume 5 Series) (France)
- "Dew Drop Inn"/"Rockin’ The Joint" (Norton 014) (1991)
- "You Better Believe Me"/"What Was Wrong" (Norton 149) (2009)
- "Hittin' On Nothing"/"Letter Full Of Tears" (Norton 170) (2012)

=== Main albums ===
- Esquerita (Capitol 1186) (1959)
- Vintage Voola (Norton 202) (1987)
- Sinner Man: The Lost Session (Norton ED-281) (2012)

=== Compilations and re-issues ===
- Capitol Collectors Series (Capitol) (1990)
- I Never Danced Nowhere! (Charly CD-224) (1990)
- Chart Scrapers (Century CD-10976) (1994)
- Sock It to Me Baby (Bear Family BCD-15504) (1994)
- Believe Me When I Say Rock & Roll Is Here to Stay (Collectables) (1998)
- Rockin' the Joint (Collectables) (1998)

=== Piano appearances by Esquerita ===
- "Didn't It Rain"/"Your God Is My God" (Baton 216) (1955) (The Heavenly Echoes)
- "The Rock Around"/"Sweet Skinny Jenny" (NRC 001) (1957, 1987) (Paul Peek)
- "Mexican Rock 'n' Roll (Instrumental)"/"Mexicali Baby" (Capitol 3884) (2/1958) (The Rio Rockers)
- "Love Is A Many Splendored Thing"/"Southern Style" (Hermitage 776) (1962) (The Eskerettes)
- "I Trusted In You"/"Southern Style" (Hermitage 10545-H-306) (1962) (Willie B.) (backup vocals by The Eskerettes)
- "Good Golly Miss Molly" (Vee Jay) (12/1964) (Little Richard)
- "Slippin' And Slidin'" (Vee Jay) (12/1964) (Little Richard)
- The Explosive Little Richard (Okeh 14117) (1/1967) (Little Richard)
- "Stingy Jenny" (Brunswick) (6/1968) (Little Richard) (co-wrote)
- "Freedom Blues"/"Dew Drop Inn" (Reprise 0907) (4/1970) (Little Richard) (co-wrote both sides)
- "Greenwood Mississippi" (Reprise 942) (1970) (Little Richard) (co-wrote)
- "Takin' Care Of Business" (CBS) (1970) (John Hammond) (from the album Source Point)

=== Unconfirmed claims ===
- "Didn't It Rain Part 1" / "Didn't It Rain Part 2" (1959?) (The Clovertones & Rev. Willie Green). Enrica 122, reissued on Eagle Records CD, EA-R 90421 (2001), and recently reissued on vinyl (posing as Enrica 122 again) (the Esquerita link appears only on the back of the Eagle CD; there is no mention of him elsewhere)
- "Touch Of The Spirit" (Evangelist Rosa Shaw). Rae-Cox 103 (1962), reissued on Eagle Records CD, EA-R 90420 (2001). The original single credits Robert Banks as keyboardist – organ, presumably – but nothing is mentioned about Esquerita.
- "Hour Of Prayer" (Evangelist Rosa Shaw). Rae-Cox 103 (1962), reissued on Eagle Records CD, EA-R 90420 (2001). The claim on the back of the Eagle CD is that Esquerita appears on piano; however, this track ("Hour of Prayer") is only vocal; there is no instrumental backing.
- "Didn't It Rain" / "I Hear Voices" (by Screamin' Jay Hawkins) (Norton 127) (2005). Reissue of two tracks from the Eagle CDs (EA-R 90420 and EA-R 90421, see above).
