= Coming to Homerica =

- The Simpsons episode
- Promotional image featuring (L/R) Carl, Homer, and Lenny.
- Episode no.: Season 20; Episode 21
- Directed by: Steven Dean Moore
- Written by: Brendan Hay
- Production code: LABF12
- Original air date: May 17, 2009

Episode features
- Chalkboard gag: "It's 'Facebook', not 'Assbook'"
- Couch gag: Repeat of the couch gag from "How the Test Was Won".

Episode chronology
← Previous "Four Great Women and a Manicure"	Next → "Homer the Whopper"
- The Simpsons season 20

"Coming to Homerica" is the twenty-first and final episode of the twentieth season of the American animated television series The Simpsons. It originally aired on the Fox network in the United States on May 17, 2009. The episode title is a reference to the 1988 film Coming to America. The episode was written by Brendan Hay and directed by Steven Dean Moore.

The storyline is a take on illegal immigration to the United States, complete with self-appointed vigilantes and building a fence to prevent it. Tying in with the episode's subject of Norwegian-descended settlers, its first US broadcast coincided with the Norwegian Constitution Day. The episode received mixed-to-positive reviews.

== Plot ==
Krusty the Clown is informed that his Krusty Burger restaurants serve the unhealthiest fast food in the world, so he decides to add a vegetarian sandwich to the menu. It proves instantly popular throughout Springfield, but much of the town soon contracts food poisoning, which is traced to a load of tainted barley that was grown in the neighboring town of Ogdenville and used at Krusty Burger. The barley industry in Ogdenville collapses as a result, and many residents (descended from the town's original Norwegian settlers) are forced to abandon their homes and move to Springfield in search of work.

The residents of Springfield are initially hospitable and hire the Ogdenvillians as day laborers. However, after Bart injures himself in a collision with a bus while showing off skateboard tricks, Homer and Marge rush him to the hospital only to find a waiting time in excess of three hours due to so many Ogdenvillians seeking medical care. Homer visits Moe's Tavern, which is now filled with Ogdenvillians, and finds that Moe has begun serving akvavit. Unaware of its high alcohol content, Homer drinks a full mug and instantly becomes intoxicated. The next morning, Mr. Burns fires him for showing up to work late and drunk.

Responding to the town's growing resentment, Mayor Joe Quimby declares at a town meeting that Springfield will close its borders to immigrants from Ogdenville. Chief Wiggum and fellow officer Lou are too lazy to control the border themselves, so they distribute guns and beer to a group of vigilantes, among them Homer, Lenny and Carl. After several failed attempts to keep Ogdenvillians out of Springfield, the vigilantes decide to build a wall. The residents of Springfield hire workers from Ogdenville to assist with the construction of the wall since they cannot build it themselves. As the building progresses, the residents of both communities discover that their similarities outweigh their differences. Once the wall is complete, the residents of Springfield realize that they miss their neighbors, so the Ogdenvillians return through a door they built in the wall. The police arrive with music to start a party for all the people there, and the episode closes with a picture of the Norwegian flag.

== Production ==
This is the only episode of the series written by Brendan Hay.

== Reception ==
This episode was seen by 5.86 million viewers.

Robert Canning of IGN gave the episode a positive review, saying that "shaky ending aside, the story unfolded well and the episode was full of funny bits." He went on to say, "funny, smart and, well, funny, "Coming To Homerica" was a great way to end a generally positive season."

Mac McEntire of TV Verdict gave it a mixed review, saying that "another season of The Simpsons comes to a close, with an up-and-down episode." He went on to say, "the first half of the episode is much stronger in laughs and content than the second half, especially the somewhat rushed ending".

Emily St. James of The A.V. Club gave the episode a B+. She liked the first half of the episode and the Norwegian jokes but thought the final act became worse due to "Homer's 'xylophobia'" and the predictable ending.

== Purported foreshadowing ==
In 2016, The Sydney Morning Herald reported that the plot of the episode matched a campaign promise by then United States presidential candidate Donald Trump to build a border wall between the United States and Mexico, which included a door to process legal migrants. It was stated as another possible prediction made by the series.
