= Billy Miller (musician) =

American collector and publisher (1954–2016)

William Henry Miller Jr. (January 1, 1954 – November 13, 2016) was an American musician, archivist, and rock 'n' roll collector. His magazine, Kicks, and record label, Norton (both co-founded with his wife, Miriam Linna), championed vintage rockabilly and garage bands.

Miller was born in Jamaica, Queens, and grew up in Carle Place, on Long Island. He attended Carle Place High School, earned a bachelor's degree in photography and art from the C.W. Post campus of Long Island University, and worked as a draftsman at the same firm (Gibbs & Cox) as his father.

Billy Miller and Linna met in 1977, they established Kicks in 1979, and Norton Records in 1986. He performed with the Zantees and the A-Bones (the A-Bones were named after a 1964 song by the Trashmen), produced records for Hasil Adkins, Roky Erickson, and Flat Duo Jets, and wrote liner notes for reissues by the Fabulous Wailers, Astronauts, the Trashmen, and others. Miller died in 2016, from complications related to multiple myeloma, kidney failure, and diabetes.
