= Brendan Hay =

American screenwriter, comic book creator

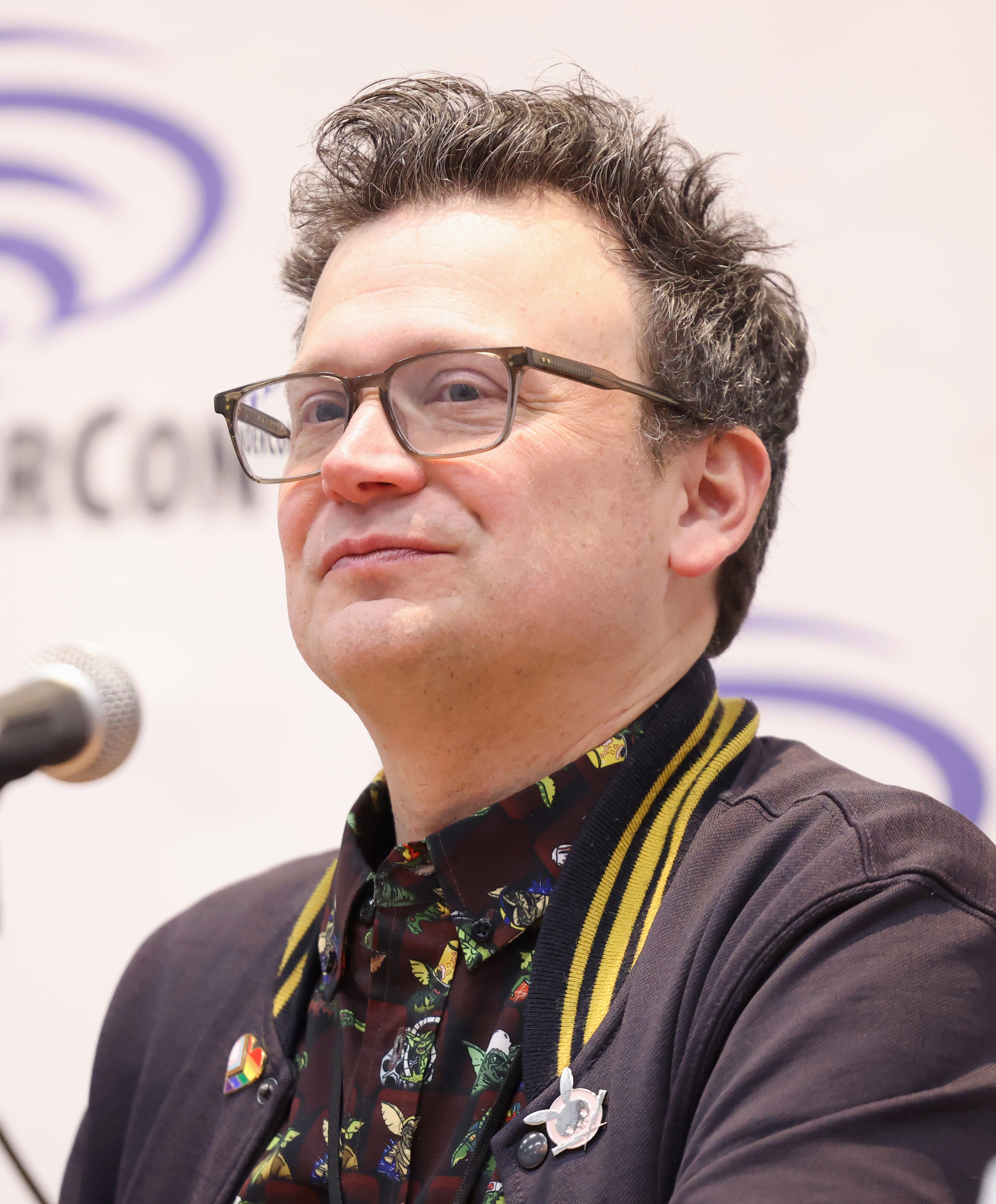
Hay at the 2025 WonderCon

Brendan Hay is an American screenwriter, comic book creator, and a television producer. Hay was executive producer of the Gremlins animated prequel series and showrunner of Harvey Girls Forever! and Dawn of the Croods, both for DreamWorks Animation and Netflix.

Hay has worked for The Daily Show as a headline producer and was a contributing writer for the America (The Book). He has written for The Simpsons (his first credited episode is the season 20 finale "Coming to Homerica"), Robot Chicken (Emmy nominated in 2011 and 2015), The Mighty B!, Frank TV, and he was the head writer on the unreleased animated Star Wars comedy, Star Wars Detours, for Lucasfilm Animation.

== Personal life ==
Hay resides in Los Angeles, California with his wife, freelance writer Jennifer Chen, their children, and their pug. He grew up in Carle Place, New York and attended Carle Place High School.

== Comic book career ==
Hay is a lifelong comic book fan. He wrote the full-length graphic novel, Rascal Raccoon's Raging Revenge, from Oni Press. He writes the digital comic book series The Dealbreakers for Four Star Studios digital anthology Double Feature. Previously, Hay wrote and created the miniseries Scream Queen for Boom! Studios, and wrote Boom!’s Eureka miniseries as well as short stories for Boom!'s Cthulhu Tales and Devil's Due Publishing's Lovebunny & Mr. Hell and Tromatic Tales. He also co-wrote the book Is It Just Me or Is Everything Shit?.
