= Carle Place High School =

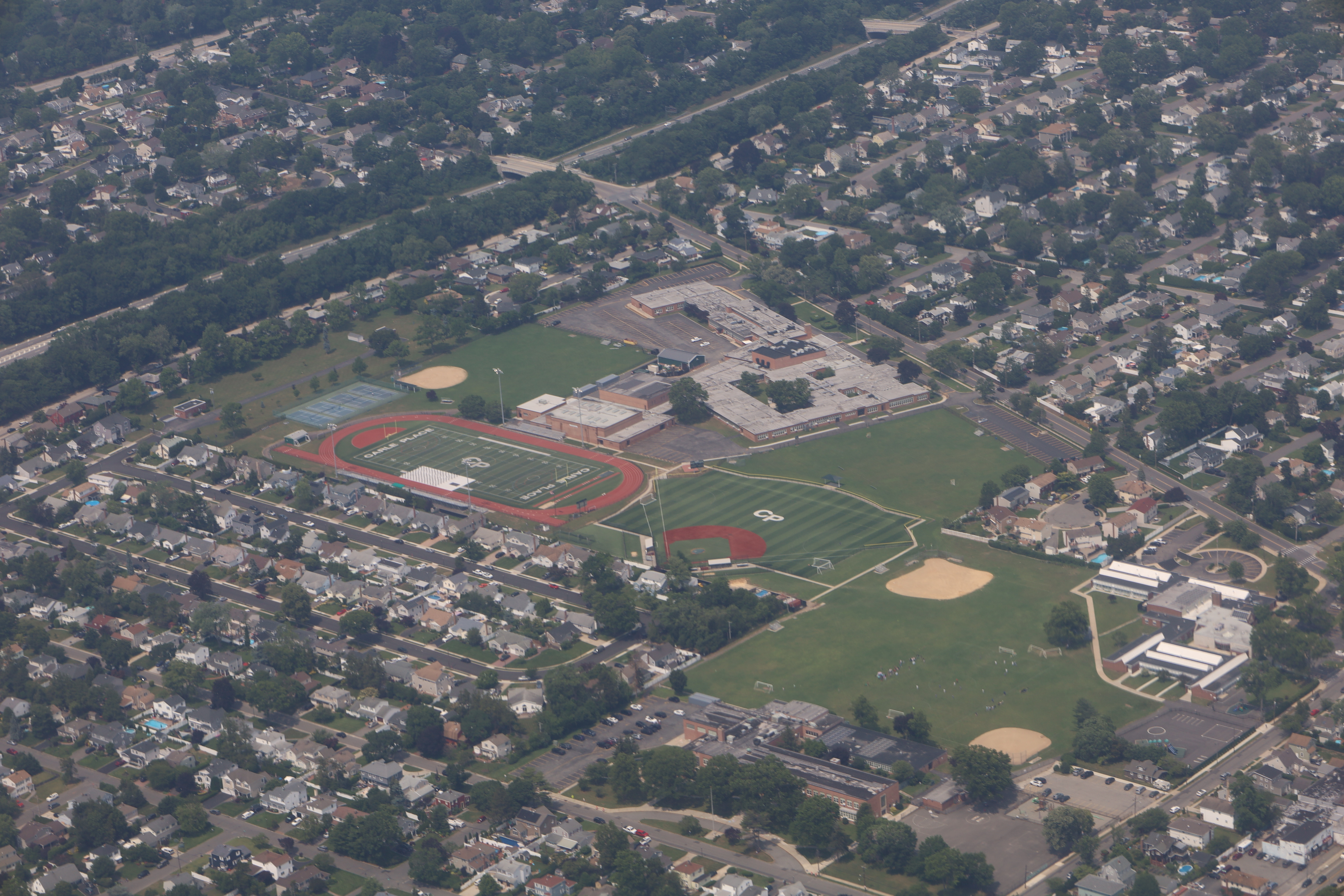
- Carle Place High School in 2021

Location
- 168 Cherry Ln; Carle Place, New York 11514; United States; 40°45′21″N 73°36′20″W

Information
- Type: Public
- Motto: CP: The C stands for compassion; the P stands for passion
- Established: 1955
- School district: Carle Place Union Free School District
- NCES School ID: 360654000435
- Principal: Allen Foraker
- Teaching staff: 72.86 (on an FTE basis)
- Grades: 7-12
- Enrollment: 610 (2023-2024)
- Student to teacher ratio: 8.37
- Campus: Suburban: Large
- Colors: Green and White
- Athletics conference: NYSPHSAA Section 8
- Nickname: Frogs
- Yearbook: Carillon
- Website: www.cps.k12.ny.us/o/cphs/page/about-us

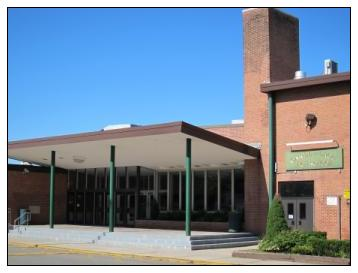
Carle Place High School entrance in 2011

Carle Place Middle/High School is a six-year public high school located in the hamlet of Carle Place in the Town of North Hempstead, Nassau County, New York. As of the 2023–24 school year, the school enrolled 610 students.

== Sister schools ==
Carle Place High School had a sister school in Filabusi, Matabeleland South Province, Zimbabwe, named Singwango Secondary School, and still donates sports equipment (e.g., old uniforms).

Carle Place High School's current sister school is Guwe Secondary School, Zimbabwe. The school still donates what is mentioned above.

== Notable alumni ==
- Tom Cipullo – Composer. His works include 225 published songs, and the critically acclaimed opera, Glory Denied.
- Matt Snell – Former pro football player for the New York Jets.
- Joe Satriani – Guitar virtuoso and instrumentalist. Lead guitarist for Chickenfoot. Played with Deep Purple and Mick Jagger.
- Steve Vai – Another guitar virtuoso who was one of Joe Satriani's students, with many solo albums to his credit, and other collaborations/appearances, including Frank Zappa, Public Image Limited, David Lee Roth, and Whitesnake.
- Charles J. Fuschillo Jr. – Former Republican member of the New York State Senate and President and CEO of the Alzheimer's Foundation of America.
- Dawn Johnsen – Lawyer and professor of constitutional law.
- Myles Brand – Former president of the NCAA.
- Brendan Hay – Television writer and producer.
- Billy Miller – Rock 'n roll musician and archivist.
- Steve Serio - Paralympic Gold Medal winning Wheelchair Basketball player.
