= The A-Bones =

American garage rock band

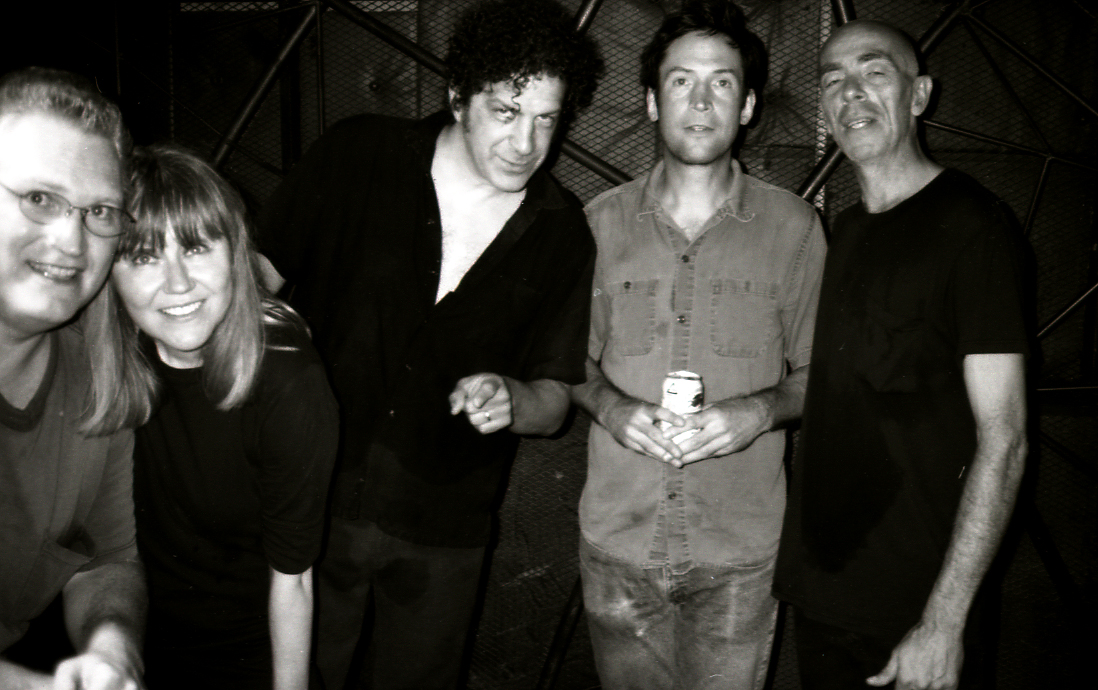
- A-Bones, August 2009, Tokyo

Background information
- Origin: Brooklyn, New York
- Genres: Garage rock, garage punk, rockabilly
- Years active: 1984–1994; 2004–2016
- Label: Norton/Various
- Past members: Miriam Linna, Billy Miller, Bruce Bennett, Marcus "The Carcass" Natale, Ira Kaplan, Mike Mariconda, Mike Lewis, Lars Espensen

The A-Bones was an American garage rock band from Brooklyn, New York. Their name was derived from a 1964 song by the Trashmen. The A-Bones was formed in 1984 by vocalist Billy Miller and his wife, drummer and co-vocalist Miriam Linna, soon after they formed the Zantees. At the time, they were the editors of the rock and roll culture fanzine Kicks and just about to launch Norton Records. Guitarist Bruce Bennett replaced original guitarist Mike Mariconda shortly after the band was formed. Marcus "The Carcass" Natale replaced founding bass player Mike Lewis (a one time member of both the Lyres and Yo La Tengo), prior to recording the A-Bones second E.P. Free Beer For Life in 1988. Tenor sax player Lars Espensen was in the group from 1990 until 2010.

The New York Times described the band solely in terms of its label, calling the group "dedicated rock revivalists", and noting "The A-Bones include Miriam Linna and Billy Miller, proprietors of Norton Records, which worships rockabilly, 1960s garage and anything having to do with that most cartoonish rock archetype: the juvenile delinquent in a leather jacket." In its overview of the band, Trouser Press praised the A-Bones' "new levels of sloppy enthusiasm" and said that the band's "joyously cruddy sound is built on Linna's simple but effective pounding, Miller's manly grunt, and Bruce Bennett's unexpectedly inventive guitar work." The Village Voice declared that a 2009 A-Bones recording "may be the missing link between Andre Williams and Jay Reatard, if Reatard had any groove in his grit." According to a series of postings on the WFMU Ichiban blog and WFMU's own Beware of The Blog blogsite, the band's choice of cover material has ranged from songs by no-hit obscurities like Mike Waggoner and the Bops, to covers of the Troggs, Larry Williams, the Velvet Underground, the Rolling Stones, the MC5, and many others.

== From Brooklyn to Japan ==
Aside from recording five albums, two EPs, and about a dozen 45s on various labels, the A-Bones also were a backup band for acts such as Hasil Adkins, Ronnie Dawson, Cordell Jackson, Andre Williams, Ray Sharpe, the Flamin' Groovies' Roy Loney and Cyril Jordan, and others. Although the band broke up in 1994, the A-Bones reunited in 2004 and performed gigs in North America, Europe, and Japan with the core line-up of Linna, Miller, Bennett, and Natale. Occasionally the group was augmented live by Yo La Tengo's Ira Kaplan, who contributed keyboards and guitar to 2009's Not Now!, 2014's Ears Wide Shut, and other recent recordings. Miller died of multiple myeloma on November 13, 2016.

== Discography ==
=== EPs ===
- Tempo Tantrum (1986)
- Free Beer for Life! (1988)

=== LPs ===
- The Life of Riley (1991)
- I Was a Teenage Mummy (1992)
- Music Minus Five (1993)
- Crash the Party: The Wild, Wild Sounds of Benny Joy (1996)
- Not Now! (2009)
- Ears Wide Shut (2014)

=== Compilation albums ===
- Daddy Wants a Cold Beer and Other Million Sellers (2004)
- I Hate CD's: Norton Records 45 RPM Singles Collection, Vol. 1 (2007)
- Daddy Rockin' Strong: A Tribute to Nolan Strong & the Diablos (The Wind / Norton Records, 2010, TWR002 LP) tracks: Real True Love and The Way You Dog Me Around (w/Andre Williams)
