= Hasil Adkins =

American singer-songwriter

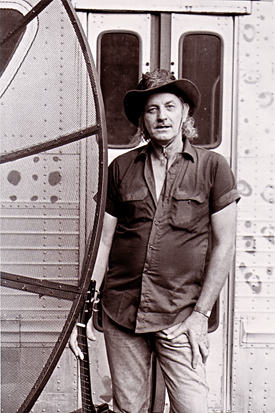
- Adkins near his home in West Virginia in 1993

Background information
- Also known as: The Haze
- Born: April 29, 1937; Boone County, West Virginia, U.S.
- Died: April 26, 2005 (aged 67) Boone County, West Virginia
- Genres: Rockabilly; country; rock and roll; blues; psychobilly; outsider
- Occupations: Musician; singer-songwriter
- Instruments: Guitar; vocals; drums; harmonica; keyboards
- Years active: 1955–2005
- Labels: Norton; Fat Possum

Hasil Adkins /ˈhæsəl/ (April 29, 1937 – April 26, 2005) was an American singer-songwriter and multi-instrumentalist. His genres include rock and roll, country, blues and more commonly rockabilly, and because of his unusual playing, singing style and themes, he is often cited as an example of outsider music and a precursor of psychobilly. He generally performed as a one-man band, playing guitar and drums at the same time.

Adkins was born during the Great Depression and grew up in poverty. His spirited, unusual lifestyle is reflected in his music. His songs, which he began recording and distributing locally in the mid-1950s, explored an affinity for chicken, sexual intercourse, and decapitation, and were obscure outside of West Virginia until the 1980s. The newfound popularity secured him a cult following, spawned the Norton Records label, and helped usher in the genre known as psychobilly.

== Personal life ==
Adkins was born in Boone County, West Virginia on April 29, 1937, where he spent his entire life. He was the youngest of ten children of Wid Adkins, a coal miner, and Alice Hale, raised in a tarpaper shack on property rented from a local coal company. Born at the time of the Great Depression, Adkins' early life was stricken by poverty. His parents were unable to provide him shoes until he was four or five years old. Some reports say he attended school for a very brief time, as few as two days of first grade.

Adkins' given name, Hasil, pronounced "Hassel", was often mispronounced. One of his brothers was named Basil, similarly pronounced "Bassel". Hasil dated a girl named Hazel, and was later given the nickname The Haze. As he explained it, the nickname came about "'cause Starlight records wanted something catchy and I didn't have no middle name."

Hasil Adkins loved to eat meat, specifically poultry, the subject of many of his songs. Following the release of 2000's Poultry in Motion, Adkins toured with "dancing go-go chicken" dancers. His diet also reportedly consisted of as much as two gallons of coffee a day, and copious amounts of liquor and cigarettes.

Aside from his fondness for meat, Adkins claimed to have but three loves in life, "girls, guitars, and cars. All three of [which] got me into trouble over the years." One such incident occurred in 1957 when he and three friends drove a car off a mountain. A local newspaper reported the car tumbled 70 feet into nearby Pond Fork. While the driver died at the scene, Adkins survived, although he sustained a permanent back injury.

In the 1980s Adkins again found himself in trouble with the law. In 1983 he was living with his girlfriend who was still a minor. Her mother reported to police that she had been raped, and Adkins was subsequently charged with third-degree sexual assault, or statutory rape of a minor less than 16 years old. In October the same year, another relationship ended with jail time, when a shootout occurred between Adkins and a jealous husband. No one was hurt, but Adkins was charged with felony illegal possession of a shotgun and spent five months in jail.

Adkins was said to have manic depression and insomnia among other mental illnesses. He never married.

On April 15, 2005, Adkins was run over in his front yard by a teenager riding an ATV. Eleven days later, on April 26, Adkins was found dead in his home, three days before his 68th birthday.

== Career ==
Nicknamed "The Haze", Adkins career began in the mid-1950s in an improvised studio in his home near Madison, West Virginia. There he put his vibrant Elvis Presley and Jerry Lee Lewis influences to work by recording scores of songs, beginning with the track "I'm Happy". In a later interview he exclaimed "I couldn't afford no drums so I just stomped my feet." He eventually learned to use percussive instruments to accompany his guitar and vocals, which would become his hallmark sound.

In 1961 Adkins headed to California in search of fame, auditioning with talent agencies in and around Los Angeles. With little to go on, he returned to West Virginia, though claimed he missed a callback from an agency a single day after departing for his home. Back at home, Adkins began performing at local nightclubs, behind a store-bought sign that read One of the Greatest Shows on Earth, the One Man Band Haze Adkins and his Happy Guitar.

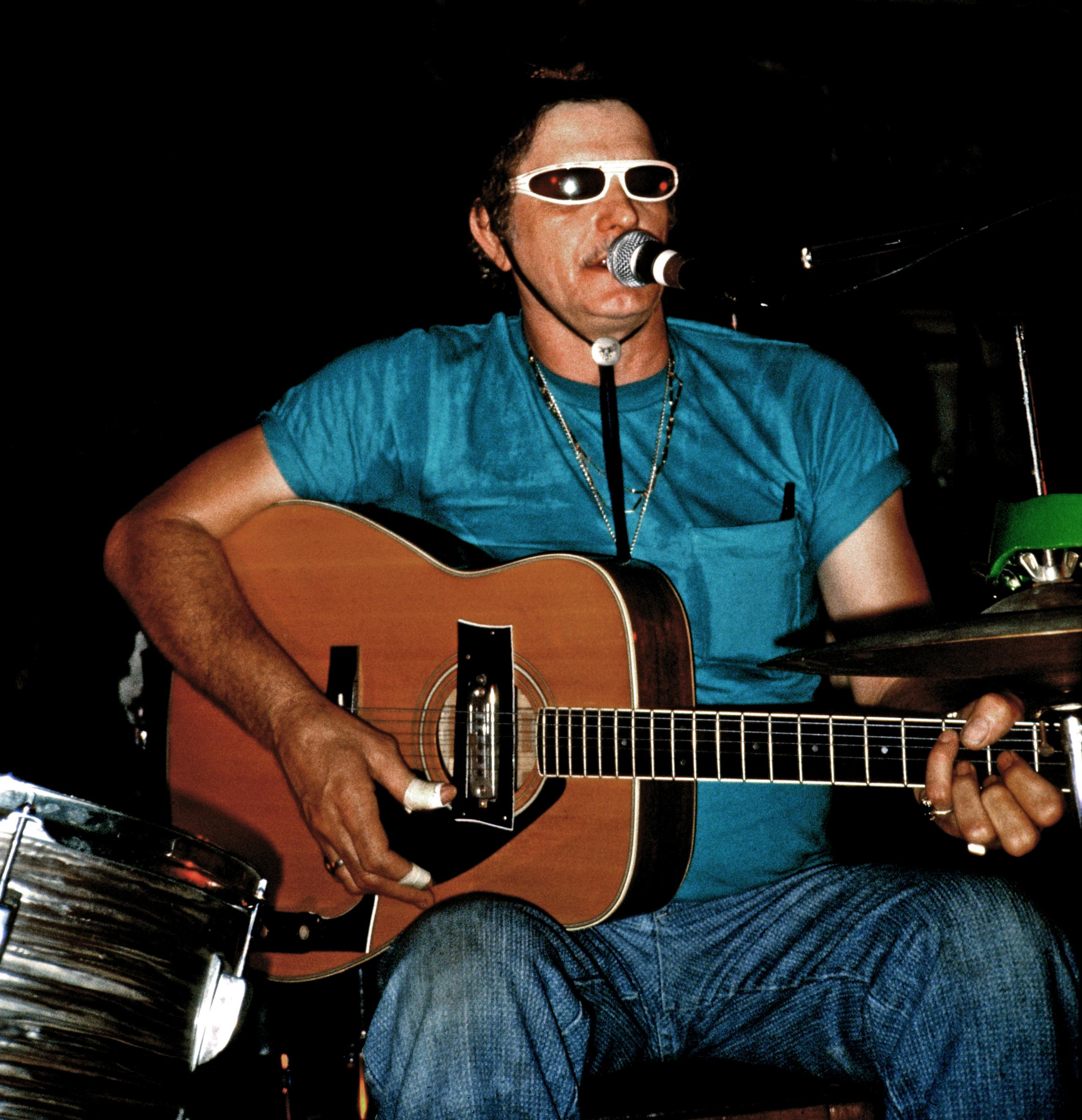
Adkins performing at The Milestone Club in Charlotte, North Carolina in 1991

The mid-1960s brought Adkins first official release through a local micro-label, with the 45 record Chicken Walk / She's Mine. What followed were the releases of some of his most notable songs, though at the time they received little attention outside of Madison. "She Said" revealed his imaginative tone in writing, in which he compared the woman of a one-night stand he had to "a dying can of that commodity meat." "No More Hot Dogs" was a song about decapitating a girlfriend and keeping her head as a wall mount.

Adkins began to transition from his rockabilly roots to country music by the 1970s, producing several self-released records. It was a tradition of his to mail a copy of each single he released to the sitting President of the United States. In 1970 Richard Nixon wrote back, saying "I am very pleased by your thoughtfulness in bringing these particular selections to my attention."

The early 1980s saw a resurgence in Adkins' fan base when the American punk rock band The Cramps did a remake of Adkins' "She Said". The Cramps having picked up the song from the bootleg compilation Rockabilly Bash during a UK tour. In 1984 UK label Big Beat Records included Hasil's original on the psychobilly compilation Rockabilly Psychosis and the Garage Disease. Having made contact with Big Beat Records, Hasil proceeded to provide them with some of his home recorded tapes, which resulted in the album She Said being released in 1985.

Also in 1985, he was approached by former Cramps drummer Miriam Linna and her husband Billy Miller about releasing some of Adkins' work. They created the independent record label Norton Records and released the compilation album Out to Hunch in 1986, which became an underground success. Billy Miller soon was appointed as Adkins' manager, and together with Linna they headed to New York City for Adkins' first professional recording session, yielding 1987's The Wild Man. Upon release, the album was featured as The New York Times "Rock Album of the Week".

"No More Hot Dogs"
"No More Hot Dogs" was recorded in Adkins home studio in 1955 and released by Norton Records in 1986. Its rockabilly roots mixed with unhinged lyrics and low-fi production laid the foundation for the psychobilly genre.

By the 1990s Adkins had gained a cult following and began touring regularly, receiving offers from more record labels. In 1994 Miles Copeland III of I.R.S. Records purchased the rights to Adkins' recordings, and although an album was planned for release, it never materialized. Frustrated, Adkins soon gained back rights to some of his songs after a deal with Mississippi blues label Fat Possum, who recorded and released 1999's What The Hell Was I Thinking? and booked him a tour alongside T-Model Ford and Elmo Williams.

In 2000 Norton released a compilation of new and previous recordings about Adkins' devotion to chicken, entitled Poultry in Motion that included such songs as "Chicken Run," "Chicken Hop," "Chicken Flop," "Chicken Wobble," and "Chicken on the Bone." In total, Adkins claimed nearly 7,000 songs to his repertoire.

While music was his true passion, Adkins enjoyed a career in the film and television industry. He played himself as a street musician in 2004's The Heart Is Deceitful Above All Things, partially narrated The Red's Breakfast Experience and starred in a comedic horror film entitled Die You Zombie Bastards!. As a composer he helped score Hair High in 2004. Adkins was also the subject of the Julien Nitzberg documentary The Wild World of Hasil Adkins, distributed by Appalshop.

Adkins was inducted into the West Virginia Music Hall of Fame in 2018.

== Legacy ==
Adkins is often cited as an important precursor to the psychobilly genre. The Cramps attribute many of their punk-psychobilly traits to Adkins; they covered "She Said" live, and released a studio version as the b-side of "Goo Goo Muck" (1981), which later appeared on their compilation album Bad Music for Bad People (1984). This helped usher Adkins into cult status as an underground musician, and inspired Cramps' drummer Miriam Linna and her husband Billy Miller to found the Norton Records label. North Carolina psychobilly group Flat Duo Jets also covered Adkins with "Let Me Come In" on the 1993 lo-fi compilation Safari, which was released on Norton Records.

== Musical style ==
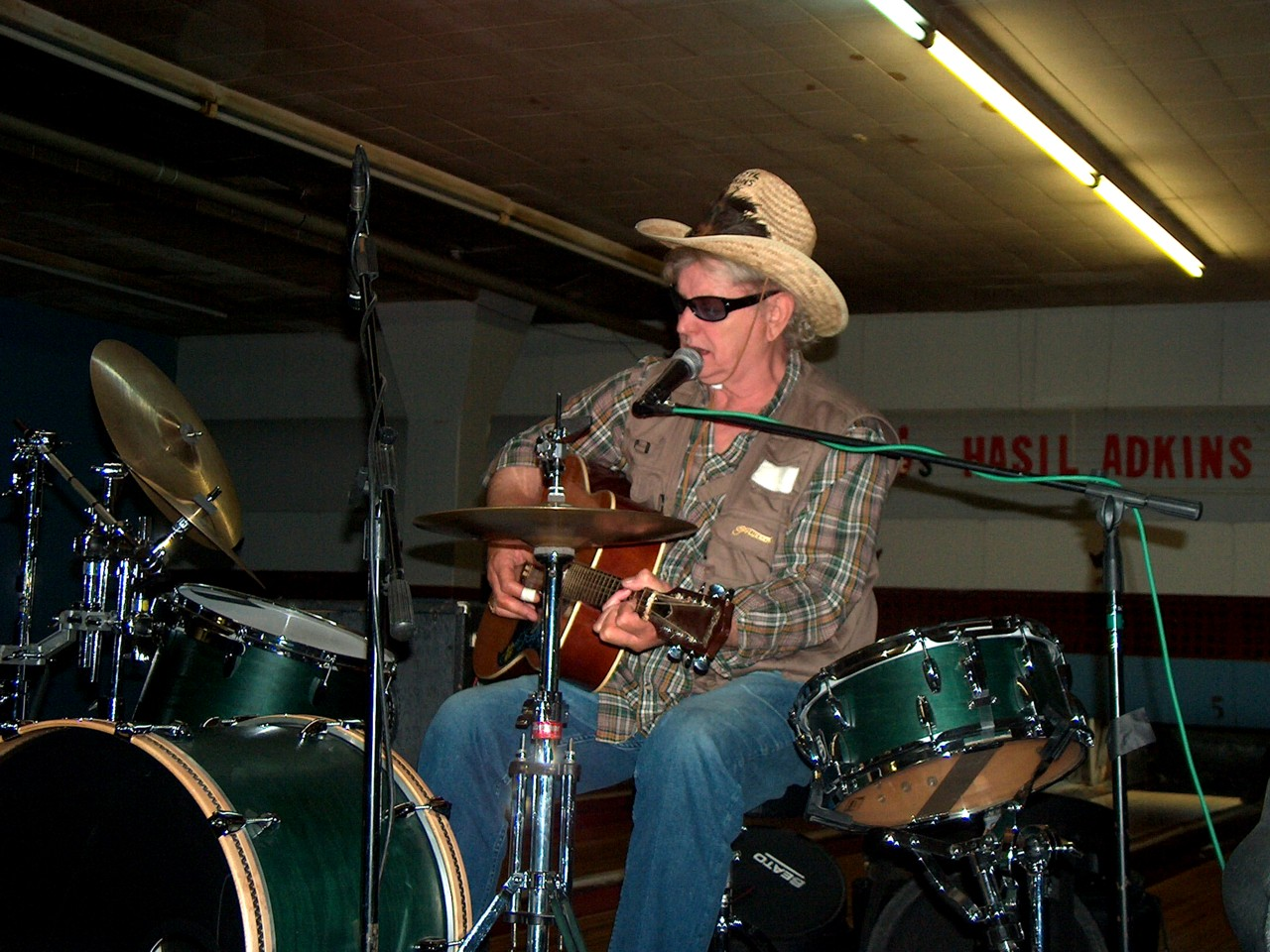
Adkins playing guitar and drums during a 2003 performance at Seidel Lanes in Baltimore

Frenetic in progression and explicit in lyrical content, Adkins was known for having an unconventional take on traditional rockabilly. His unpolished sound was a praised by-product of the makeshift studio equipment used for the majority of his career. "I didn't try to be primitive, I just had bad microphones", he wrote. His lyrics explored topics such as eating peanut butter on the moon and the suggestive strut of a chicken. Recurring themes in Adkins' catalogue included sex, heartbreak, decapitation, aliens, hot dogs and poultry. Together with country and honky-tonk, Adkins' assortment of styles helped delineate a genre known as psychobilly.

Adkins performed as a one-man band, using foot pedals to play the drums, or simply stomped his feet on the floor to an often detuned guitar. He once vowed that he would play "twelve to twenty" instruments simultaneously, including playing the piano and organ with his elbows. He noted in interviews that his primary heroes and influences were Hank Williams, Jimmie Rodgers, Little Richard, and Col. Harland Sanders, the inventor of Kentucky Fried Chicken. Adkins attributed his desire to perform as a one-man band to these artists, stating that when he was a child, he assumed the only credited musician in the band must have played all the instruments in the recordings. The first time he saw a guitarist in action, he built a guitar of his own.

Many of Adkins' songs were accompanied by a dance of the same name. "The Hunch" was understood to be a dry humping dance craze, although Adkins failed to define it in interviews. He used the term to describe anything of sexual relation, even naming his car the "Hunchin' Wagon". "The Slop" was a song and dance Adkins pioneered for "the drunks", which he made so "you could just go left or right or fall down or anything you ran into". 2000's Poultry in Motion introduced a slew of chicken dances. "The Chicken Walk" involved "quiver[ing] yourself from head to toe" to mimic that of a chicken, while "The Chicken Flop" was simply "flopping all over the place".

Adkins primarily recorded and performed his own songs, although Peanut Butter Rock and Roll included covers of Carl Perkins' "Blue Suede Shoes" and Harry Belafonte's "Day-O". Additionally, Achy Breaky Ha Ha Ha, a country album, included covers of songs by Bill Monroe, Hank Williams, Johnny Cash, Carter Stanley, and A. P. Carter.

== Discography ==
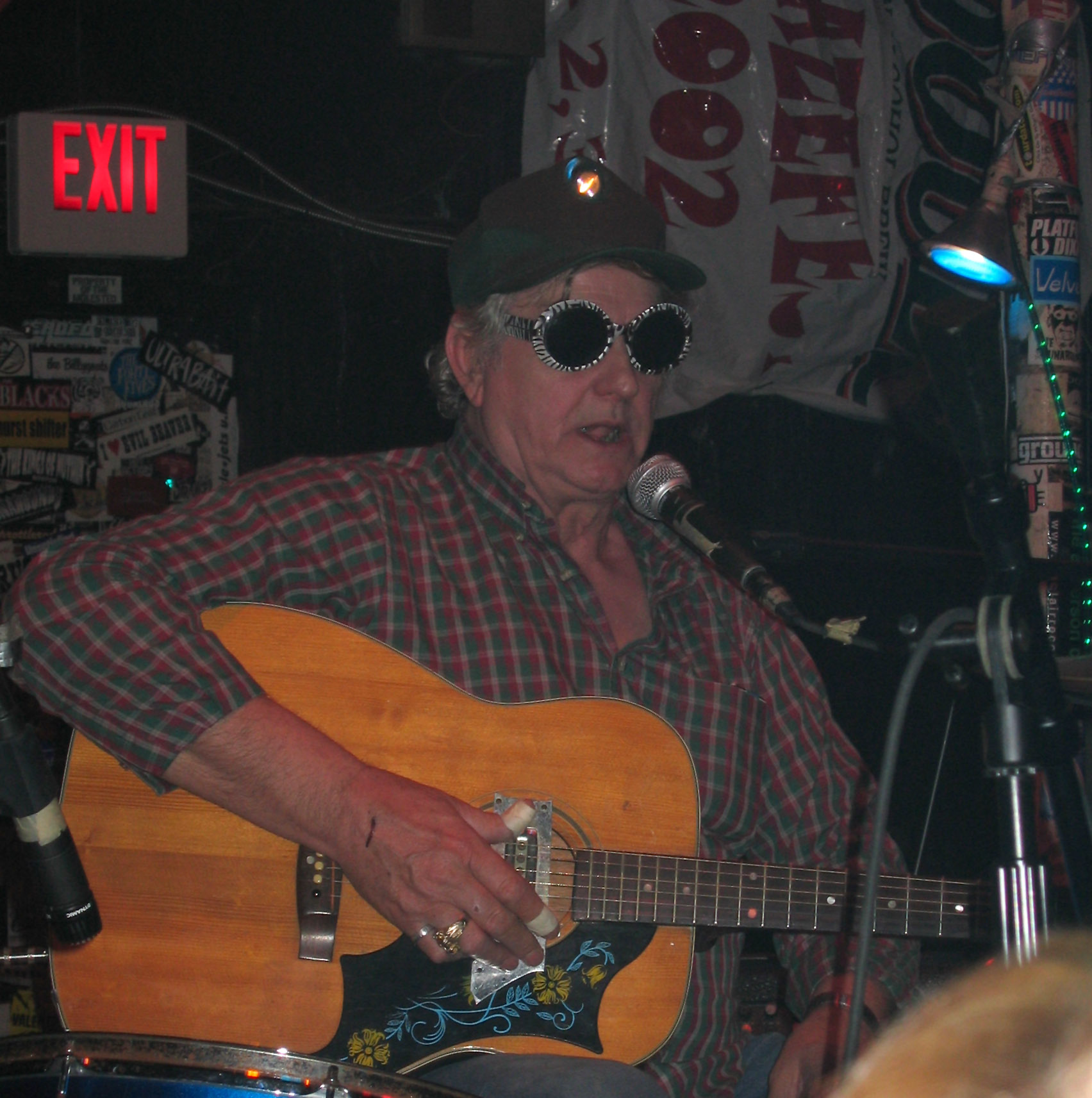
Hasil Adkins performing at Local 506 in Chapel Hill, North Carolina in 2003

Singles and EPs

- Haze's House Party (Norton Records, 1986, LULU1)
- Big Red Satellite (Norton Records, 1987, NORTON 002)

Albums

- He Said (Big Beat Records, 1985)
- Out to Hunch (Norton Records, 1986, ED-201)
- The Wild Man (Norton Records, 1987)
- Moon Over Madison (Norton Records, 1990)
- Peanut Butter Rock and Roll (Norton Records, 1990)
- Live in Chicago (Bughouse, 1992)
- Look at that Caveman Go!! (Norton Records, 1993)
- Achy Breaky Ha Ha Ha (Norton Records, 1994)
- What the Hell Was I Thinking (Fat Possum / Turnstile, 1998)
- Drinkin My Life Away (Shake It Records, 2003)
- Evening Show Road (Nero's Nepture)

Compilations

- Chicken Walk (Dee Jay (Germany), 1986)
- Poultry in Motion (Norton Records, 2000)
- Best of the Haze (CIA / Copeland International Arts, 2006)
- Night Life (2009)
- White Light/White Meat (Norton Records)

== Filmography ==
- The Wild World of Hasil Adkins (1993)
- R.I.P. Rest in Pieces (1997), musician
- Let Me Be Your Band (2003)
- The Heart Is Deceitful Above All Things (2004)
- Die You Zombie Bastards! (2005)
