= Norton Records =

US record label

- Founded: 1986
- Founder: Miriam Linna, Billy Miller
- Genre: Rock
- Country of origin: U.S.
- Location: New York City
- Official website: nortonrecords.com

Norton Records is an American independent record label founded by musicians Miriam Linna and Billy Miller in 1986. The label concentrates on releasing rock, rockabilly, primitive music, punk, garage rock, and early rhythm and blues. Most of its output, both new releases and reissues, is issued on vinyl.

== Beginnings ==
Billy Miller first met Miriam Linna while she was drumming for the Cramps in 1976. The two were properly introduced one day in 1977 while Miller was selling items at a record show; they chatted about music and he sold Linna a copy of "You Must Be a Witch", a single by the Lollipop Shoppe. Miller later said, "You can't let a gal with taste like that slip away!" A year later, in 1978, Miller and Linna started Kicks, a magazine which was devoted to obscure rock, soul, and rockabilly.

In 1986, the couple published an article in Kicks about West Virginia guitarist Hasil Adkins, for which the response was so intense that Linna and Miller decided to form a record label to reissue his music. They named their company after Ed Norton, Art Carney's character on the TV sitcom The Honeymooners. Adkins had recorded about 15 singles in the 1950s, but many had never been released or collected on an LP. The label's debut release was a four-song 7" titled "Haze's House Party", soon followed by the Adkins compilation Out to Hunch. "We made 500 copies and prayed that it would sell," Linna recalled of the compilation album. In 1987, Norton released an Adkins 7" with two songs, and Miller co-produced recording sessions for a later LP, The Wild Man.

== Releases ==
Along with previously unreleased discoveries, Linna and Miller have reissued hundreds of obscurities and classics from the 1950s and 1960s. Their label's extensive catalog also includes current talent. Notable artists released on Norton are Tommy James, Doug Sahm, Gene Vincent, Kim Fowley, Reigning Sound, King Coleman, Esquerita, Charlie Feathers, Flat Duo Jets, Ron Haydock, Flamin' Groovies co-founder Roy Loney, Terry Manning, Rudy Ray Moore, Ronnie Self, Jack Starr, Gene Summers, the Teenbeats, King Uszniewicz, Gino Washington, Andre Williams, and Link Wray. In 2009, Norton released three outer space-themed Sun Ra compilations: Interplanetary Melodies, The Second Stop Is Jupiter, and Rocket Ship Rock.

Norton releases include themed singles series with special sleeve and label designs. The 45 RPM Jukebox Series in 1999, for example, featured nine singles by Pacific Northwest garage bands the Sonics and the Wailers in Etiquette Records/Norton sleeves. The Rolling Stones Cover series of 7-inch records, pairing contemporary artists covering Stones songs, began in 2003 and features 32 split singles with London Records-styled graphics. The Sun Records Jukebox Series collected 28 Sun label rarities by Carl Perkins, Roy Orbison, and Sonny Burgess among many others on 14 split singles with classic Sun Records-inspired designs. Norton's El Paso Rock series of LPs and CDs chronicles the early days of the El Paso, Texas, rock scene, beginning with the first recordings of Bobby Fuller, including the original 1964 pre-hit version of "I Fought the Law" first released on Fuller's own Exeter label. Volume two in the series has more of Fuller's music in a selection of "never before issued live mayhem from Texas teen clubs, shopping centers, bowling alleys circa 1962–64 plus insane home recordings."

== Acclaim ==
In Billboard's "Declaration of Independents" column, Norton received kudos for their Sonics and Fabulous Wailers reissues, and Goldmine praised Norton's Big Star CD Nobody Can Dance as "the most exciting reissue of the decade... one of the strongest pieces of music I've heard in 25 years." WFMU, a radio station in Jersey City, New Jersey, celebrated the label's 15 years in the business with the "Norton Records 15th Anniversary Roast", which aired October 25, 2001, on Music to Spazz By hosted by Dave "the Spazz" Abramson.

== Music events ==
Norton Records stages events in the New York area, such as their 2005 New Year's Eve Rock N' Roll Show & Dance at Union Pool in Brooklyn, which was headlined by Linna and Miller's band the A-Bones (named for a 1964 song by the Trashmen) and emceed by the Mighty Hannibal.

== Publishing ventures ==
In addition to the magazines Kicks and Bad Seed, Linna published a book in 1997 about photographer Eddie Rocco, who contributed to Charlton Brown's Ebony Song Parade and freelanced for Fort Worth's Sepia magazine. The Great Lost Photographs of Eddie Rocco collects many unpublished 1950s and 1960s pictures including shots of Esquerita, Ruth Brown, the Treniers, and Roy Orbison. After finding a copy at the Smithsonian's Museum of American History bookstore, Dr. Ink (a.k.a. Dr. Roy Peter Clark) highlighted Rocco's importance in an April 2, 2003, review:

Rocco's work would come to the attention of Charlton Publications, a house that specialized in printing lyrics of popular music along with photos of the stars. Founded in 1931, Charlton produced a series of popular music magazines, which provided beat-happy boppers of all ethnicities with information on R&B musicians, songwriters, and disc jockeys... In spite of its reputation for mass-producing pulp fiction and comic books, Charlton Publications, writes Miriam Linna, "has long gone unlauded for pioneering true racial integration in mass market magazines at a time when other teen periodicals remained safely segregated." Rocco was no Pat Boone, exploiting and whitewashing black creativity. Instead, he and his camera were telling the untold story of the evolution of black music beyond the borders of a black audience.

In 2009, Linna launched her paperback book imprint, Kicks Books, with Sweets and Other Stories by Andre Williams, followed in 2011 by This Planet Is Doomed–a collection of Sun Ra's poetry–and Save the Last Dance for Satan, Nick Tosches' account of the music business and the Mafia. There are several Kicks titles in print including I Fought the Law, Linna's Bobby Fuller biography published in 2015. Kicks Books releases have been accompanied by Kicks Perfume custom fragrances, and Kicks also pressed a 7" Sun Ra centennial memorial souvenir record in 2014 to launch a three-book Sun Ra series.

== 20th anniversary ==
In 2006, Norton Records marked its 20th anniversary with the release of an 80-page catalog, featuring a cover photograph of Marty Lott: the Gulf Coast Fireball AKA The Phantom and a dedication: "Our 20th Anniversary catalog is dedicated to the memory of Norton's very first artist, the immortal Hasil Adkins." Adkins died in 2005. Also in 2006, Norton released Dangerous Game, the first solo album by Mary Weiss, the original lead singer of the Shangri-Las. Backed by the Reigning Sound, Weiss recorded 13 original songs plus a cover version of the Shangri-Las' "Heaven Only Knows".

== 25th anniversary ==
On November 10–13, 2011, Norton's 25th anniversary celebration was a four-night "all star spectacular" at The Bell House in Brooklyn. The bands which performed included Black Lips, the 5.6.7.8's, the Alarm Clocks, Andre Williams, Dave "Baby" Cortez, the Mighty Hannibal, Mick Collins, the Great Gaylord, the Reigning Sound, Jackie and the Cedrics, Question Mark and the Mysterians, the Sonics, Bloodshot Bill, Figures of Light, and many others. Concurrent with the celebration, Norton issued a number of new releases, including the Figures of Light album Drop Dead and a self-titled album by Cortez.

== Hurricane damage ==
Norton's Red Hook, Brooklyn, warehouse and mail order operation was heavily damaged by Hurricane Sandy on October 29, 2012, and the label lost most of its back catalog. Fans of the label and local volunteers organized fund-raisers and over several months helped to clean up the warehouse and save as many of the records as possible. As of January 2016, only 66 of Norton's releases were not back in print. Linna said she was planning to restore the rest of the catalog by the end of 2016.

== Retail ==
In January 2016, the label opened a brick-and-mortar retail store, the Norton Record Shop, in the Prospect Heights area of Brooklyn, to sell records and printed matter. Miller died of multiple myeloma in November 2016. Linna issued the acclaimed lost Dion album on Norton in 2018. The shop closed in 2018, and mail order operations were moved to Cleveland, Ohio. She published the 576 page book Mind Over Matter: The Myths and Mysteries of Detroit's Fortune Records in 2020.

== See also ==
- List of record labels
