= Carle Place, New York =

Carle Place Frog Hollow; Mineola Park
- Hamlet and census-designated place
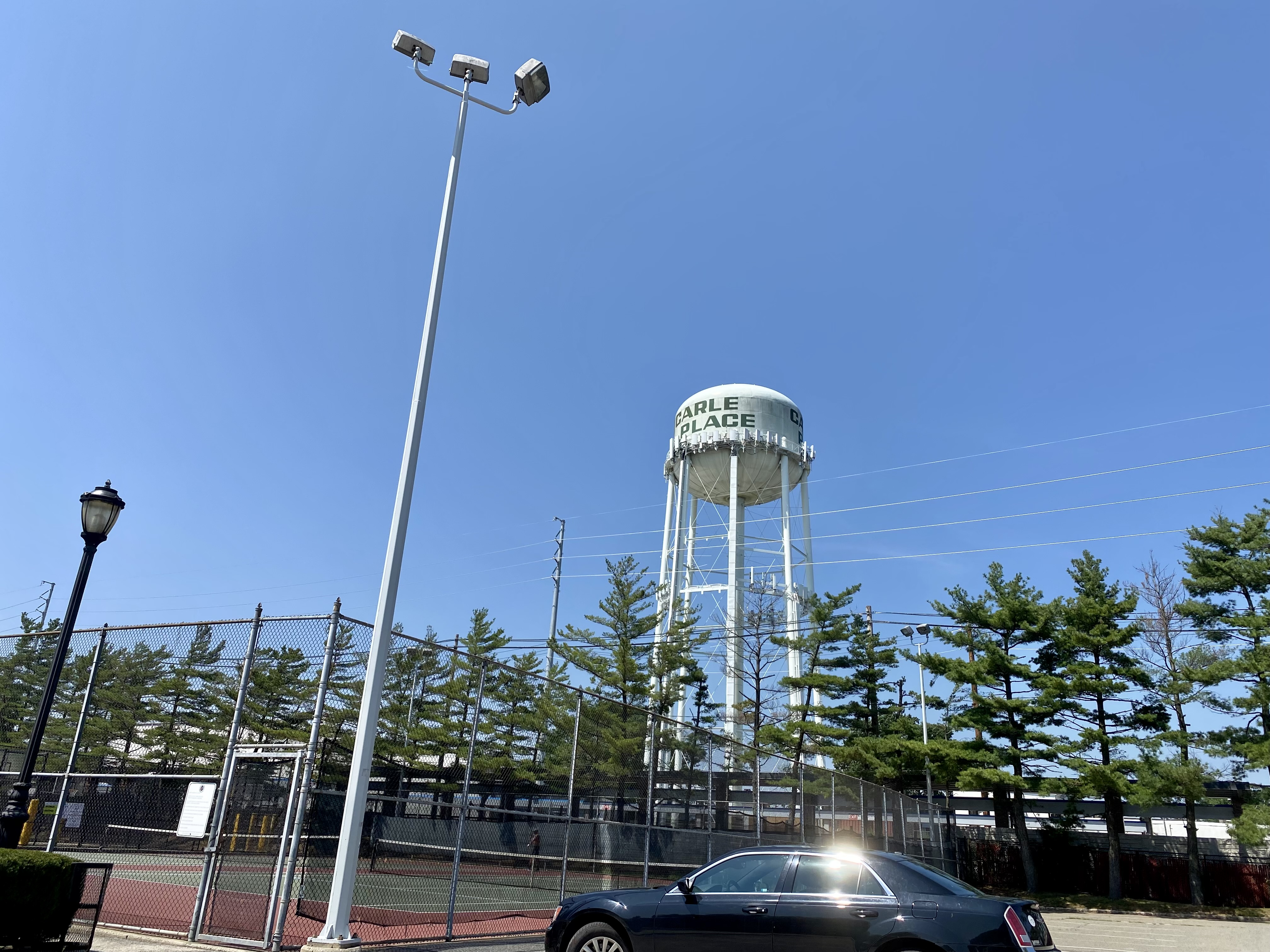
- The Carle Place Water Tower, as seen from Charles J. Fuschillo Park in 2021

- Location in Nassau County and the state of New York

- Location on Long Island Location within the state of New York
- Coordinates: 40°45′09″N 073°36′37″W
- Country: United States
- State: New York
- County: Nassau
- Town: North Hempstead
- Named for: Silas Carle

Area
  - Total: 0.96 sq mi (2.48 km^{2})
  - Land: 0.96 sq mi (2.48 km^{2})
  - Water: 0 sq mi (0.00 km^{2})
- Elevation: 108 ft (33 m)

Population (2020)
  - Total: 5,005
  - Density: 5,222.8/sq mi (2,016.53/km^{2})
- Time zone: UTC-5 (Eastern (EST))
  - Summer (DST): UTC-4 (EDT)
- ZIP codes: 11514 (Carle Place); 11590 (Westbury)
- Area codes: 516, 363
- FIPS code: 36-12419
- GNIS feature ID: 945835

Carle Place (also known historically as Frog Hollow and Mineola Park) is a hamlet and census-designated place (CDP) in the Town of North Hempstead in Nassau County, on Long Island, in New York, United States. The CDP's population was 5,005 at the time of the 2020 census.

== History ==
In 1946, developer William J. Levitt bought 19 acres of land near the Carle Place train station for an experiment. His crews brought pre-cut lumber to the site and rapidly assembled 600 low-cost houses, offering affordable suburban living with an easy commute into offices in New York City. Within five years, returning veterans and their families swelled the population by 500 percent. It transformed Carle Place, and served as the prototype for Levittown, the larger development which Levitt began the following year only a few miles away.

In 1999, St. Mary's Chapel – a historic church in the hamlet – was listed on the New York State Register of Historic Places, and it was subsequently added to the National Register of Historic Places in 2005.

=== Etymology ===
The hamlet is named for the Carle House – a 32-room house built by Silas Carle in Westbury in the 1800s. It was commonly known as the "Carle Place", and the surrounding area later took the name. The house still stands today, near the intersection of Jericho Turnpike and Carle Road.

The area was also known as Mineola Park between circa 1895 and 1915, derived from an unsuccessful real estate development of the same name located within the hamlet. The name was reverted to Carle Place in 1915, and there was only one further attempt to change it, which took place in 1951 after Levitt & Sons purchased and developed much of the area consisting of the unsuccessful development. The proposal failed, as the majority of residents preferred keeping the name, and no attempts to change it have taken place since.

Another historic name for the area is Frog Hollow, which is still used colloquially and is the source of the Carle Place Union Free School District's mascot.

== Geography ==
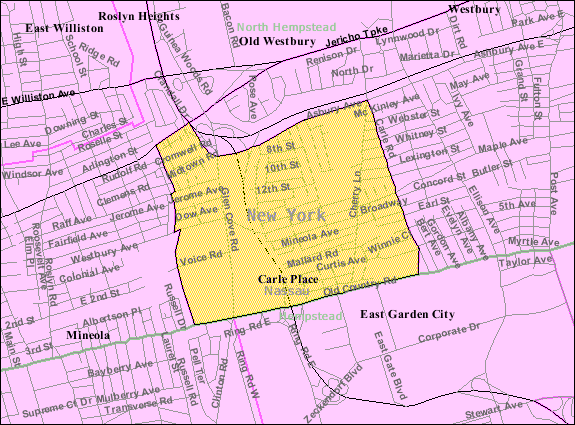
U.S. Census map of Carle Place

According to the United States Census Bureau, the CDP has a total area of 0.935 square miles (2.42 km^{2}), all land.

The incorporated villages bordering Carle Place are Mineola, Garden City, Old Westbury, and Westbury. Carle Place also borders the part of Uniondale known as East Garden City – an unincorporated area of the Town of Hempstead.

Carle Place's southern border runs along Old Country Road (CR 25), while its eastern border runs along Carle Road. The CDP's southern border additionally forms a portion of the town border between North Hempstead and Hempstead.

Furthermore, most of Carle Place's western border with Mineola follows the alignment of the former Long Island Motor Parkway.

=== Climate ===
According to the Köppen climate classification, Carle Place has a Humid subtropical climate (type Cfa) with cool, wet winters and hot, humid summers. Precipitation is uniform throughout the year, with slight spring and fall peaks.

Climate data for Carle Place, New York, 1991–2020 normals, extremes 1999–present
Month	Jan	Feb	Mar	Apr	May	Jun	Jul	Aug	Sep	Oct	Nov	Dec	Year
Record high °F (°C)	71 (22)	73 (23)	85 (29)	94 (34)	97 (36)	103 (39)	105 (41)	104 (40)	100 (38)	90 (32)	83 (28)	76 (24)	105 (41)
Mean daily maximum °F (°C)	39 (4)	43 (6)	50 (10)	61 (16)	70 (21)	80 (27)	85 (29)	83 (28)	76 (24)	65 (18)	55 (13)	45 (7)	63 (17)
Mean daily minimum °F (°C)	26 (−3)	28 (−2)	34 (1)	42 (6)	51 (11)	61 (16)	66 (19)	65 (18)	58 (14)	48 (9)	40 (4)	31 (−1)	46 (8)
Record low °F (°C)	−10 (−23)	−7 (−22)	3 (−16)	13 (−11)	32 (0)	43 (6)	50 (10)	48 (9)	38 (3)	27 (−3)	10 (−12)	−1 (−18)	−10 (−23)
Average precipitation inches (mm)	3.62 (92)	3.17 (81)	4.35 (110)	4.15 (105)	3.90 (99)	3.85 (98)	4.40 (112)	3.72 (94)	3.91 (99)	4.08 (104)	3.73 (95)	3.82 (97)	46.7 (1,186)
Source: The Weather Channel

==== Plant zone ====
According to the United States Department of Agriculture (USDA), Carle Place is located within hardiness zone 7b.

== Economy ==
Carle Place is considered a bedroom community of the City of New York. As such, many residents commute to/from New York for work. The hamlet also consists of areas of varying sizes zoned for commercial, retail, and industrial uses.

Additionally, Carle Place was formerly home to the headquarters of 1-800 Flowers.

== Demographics ==
Historical population
Census	Pop.	Note	%±
2000	5,247		—
2010	4,981		−5.1%
2020	5,005		0.5%
U.S. Decennial Census

=== Racial and ethnic composition ===
Carle Place CDP, New York – Racial and ethnic composition Note: the US Census treats Hispanic/Latino as an ethnic category. This table excludes Latinos from the racial categories and assigns them to a separate category. Hispanics/Latinos may be of any race.
Race / Ethnicity (NH = Non-Hispanic)	Pop 2000	Pop 2010	Pop 2020	% 2000	% 2010	% 2020
White alone (NH)	4,427	3,881	3,434	84.37%	77.92%	68.61%
Black or African American alone (NH)	89	90	148	1.70%	1.81%	2.96%
Native American or Alaska Native alone (NH)	1	0	6	0.02%	0.00%	0.12%
Asian alone (NH)	286	391	488	5.45%	7.85%	9.75%
Native Hawaiian or Pacific Islander alone (NH)	1	0	0	0.02%	0.00%	0.00%
Other race alone (NH)	4	18	44	0.08%	0.36%	0.88%
Mixed race or Multiracial (NH)	31	49	145	0.59%	0.98%	2.90%
Hispanic or Latino (any race)	408	552	740	7.78%	11.08%	14.79%
Total	5,247	4,981	5,005	100.00%	100.00%	100.00%

=== 2020 census ===
As of the 2020 census, Carle Place had a population of 5,005. The median age was 43.6 years. 19.2% of residents were under the age of 18 and 19.3% of residents were 65 years of age or older. For every 100 females, there were 97.0 males, and for every 100 females age 18 and over, there were 94.9 males.

100.0% of residents lived in urban areas, while 0.0% lived in rural areas.

There were 1,825 households in Carle Place, of which 30.1% had children under the age of 18 living in them. Of all households, 57.2% were married-couple households, 15.3% were households with a male householder and no spouse or partner present, and 22.6% were households with a female householder and no spouse or partner present. About 23.1% of all households were made up of individuals, and 12.7% had someone living alone who was 65 years of age or older.

There were 1,908 housing units, of which 4.4% were vacant. The homeowner vacancy rate was 0.8% and the rental vacancy rate was 5.5%.

=== 2010 Census ===
As of the 2010 census The make up of the population was 77.9% Non-Hispanic white, 2.1% Black or African American, 7.9% Asian, 3.8% from other races, and 1.9% from two or more races. Hispanic or Latino of any race were 11.1% of the population.

=== 2000 Census ===
As of the 2000 census, there were 5,247 people, 1,900 households, and 1,371 families residing in the CDP. The population density was 2,155.2 people/km^{2} (5,582 people/mi^{2}). The Town is known for being one square mile (2.6 km^{2}). There were 1,922 housing units at an average density of 789.5 units/km^{2} (2,045 units/mi^{2}). The racial makeup of the CDP was 89.88% White, 1.89% African American, 0.02% Native American, 5.45% Asian, 0.02% Pacific Islander, 1.47% from other races, and 1.28% from two or more races. Hispanic or Latino of any race were 7.78% of the population.

There were 1,900 households, out of which 31.7% had children under the age of 18 living with them, 59.8% were married couples living together, 9.5% had a female householder with no husband present, and 27.8% were non-families. 23.9% of all households were made up of individuals, and 10.0% had someone living alone who was 65 years of age or older. The average household size was 2.76 and the average family size was 3.31.

In the CDP, the population was spread out, with 22.8% under the age of 18, 7.6% from 18 to 24, 29.9% from 25 to 44, 24.4% from 45 to 64, and 15.3% who were 65 years of age or older. The median age was 39 years. For every 100 females, there were 91.7 males. For every 100 females age 18 and over, there were 90.7 males.

The median income for a household in the CDP was $70,938, and the median income for a family was $85,240. Males had a median income of $51,744 versus $37,344 for females. The per capita income for the CDP was $31,624. About 3.4% of families and 5.4% of the population were below the poverty line, including 5.1% of those under age 18 and 10.0% of those age 65 or over.

== Education ==
Carle Place has its own school district, which, though it includes small portions of the villages of Westbury and Mineola, is one of the smallest in New York state. It consists of three schools which adjoin each other on one large campus:

- Cherry Lane School, a primary school serving grades K-2
- Rushmore Avenue School, an elementary school serving grades 3–6
- Carle Place Middle School/High School, a secondary school serving grades 7–12

The entirety of Carle Place is located within this district, thus meaning all children who reside within the hamlet and attend public schools go to Carle Place's schools.

== Transportation ==
The Long Island Rail Road's Carle Place station is located within the hamlet. It is located along the LIRR's Main Line and is served by Port Jefferson Branch trains.

== Landmark ==
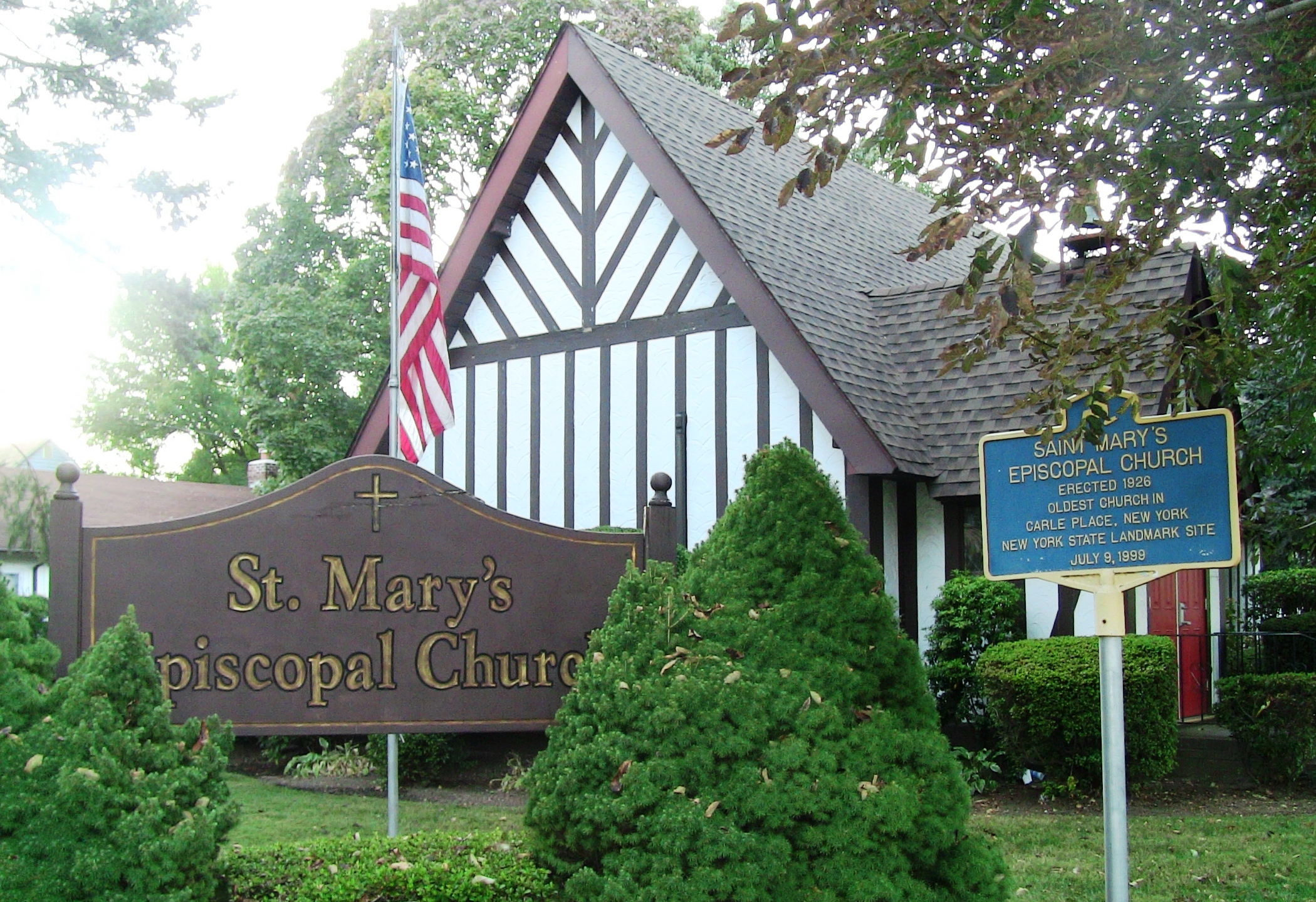
The historic Saint Mary's Chapel, located on Rushmore Avenue

- St. Mary's Chapel – A historic church within the hamlet listed on both the New York State Register of Historic Places and the National Register of Historic Places.

== Notable people ==
- Richard Friesner, scientist, entrepreneur, and professor at Columbia University, member of the American Academy of Arts and Sciences, and co-founder of Schrödinger, Inc., a drug discovery tech company
- Brendan Hay, Emmy-nominated TV writer and showrunner
- Matt Snell, former player with the New York Jets
- Richard Staff, baseball writer
- Steve Vai, guitarist
