= Miriam Linna =

Canadian-American drummer (born 1955)

- Miriam Linna drumming during a recording session, July 2007

Background information
- Born: October 16, 1955 (age 70); Sudbury, Ontario, Canada
- Genres: Rock
- Occupations: Drummer; singer; musician; journalist; writer; record producer
- Instrument: Drums
- Website: nortonrecords.com

Miriam Linna (born October 16, 1955) is a Canadian-American drummer who has run the Brooklyn, New York-based independent record label Norton Records since 1986, originally with her husband, the late producer and singer-songwriter Billy Miller. Her skill as a drummer earned her a "May I recommend?" nod from Bob Dylan on his XM Theme Time Radio Hour program (episode 37) in January 2007.

Linna is part of the collective of musicians which emerged from the Cleveland, Ohio, punk rock scene including the Dead Boys and Pere Ubu. When the re-formed Rocket from the Tombs performed in Hoboken, New Jersey, in 2003, singer David Thomas dedicated the song "Amphetamine" to her.

== Musician ==
Linna was a founding member of the Cramps, performing in the band from their first date on November 1, 1976, until July 10, 1977. She appears on their How to Make a Monster compilation album. Linna left the Cramps to join the new wave band Nervus Rex.

After performing with the Zantees, Linna and Miller launched the A-Bones (named after a 1964 tune by the Trashmen). The A-Bones released two 10-inch EPs (Tempo Tantrum in 1986 and Free Beer for Life! in 1988), followed by four full-length albums between 1991 and 1996. The A-Bones regrouped after a short hiatus to perform in Spain with Little Richard, Andre Williams and the Great Gaylord. Linna also played drums on Maureen Tucker's 1994 album Dogs Under Stress. Linna and A-Bones bassist Marcus "The Carcass" Natale guested on a 2007 recording session by the proto-punk band Figures of Light, produced by Miller; she played drums on Figures of Light's 2011 album Drop Dead, produced by Mick Collins of the Dirtbombs.

In 2014, as "Miriam", Linna released her first solo album on Norton Records, Nobody's Baby, produced by Sam Elwitt. The album features Linna singing over Phil Spector- and Jack Nitzsche-inspired arrangements of a selection of mostly obscure cover songs from the 1960s. Norton released a follow-up LP, Down Today, in 2015.

== Author and publisher ==
Linna's past magazine ventures include Kicks (co-edited with Miller), Smut Peddler, and Bad Seed. Her first fanzine in 1976 was The Flamin Groovies Monthly, which she inherited from Bomp Records founder Greg Shaw. Her lengthy liner notes for Norton and other labels display an unusual writing style of wild word play and imaginative humor. In 1997, Linna and Miller published (as "Kicks Magazine Photo Album No. 1") The Great Lost Photographs of Eddie Rocco. Rocco contributed to Ebony Song Parade and freelanced for Fort Worth, Texas-based Sepia magazine, and the book collects many of his previously unpublished 1950s and 1960s images, including shots of Ruth Brown, Esquerita, Roy Orbison, and the Treniers.

In 2004, Linna co-edited Sin-A-Rama: Sleaze Sex Paperbacks of the Sixties (Feral House) also contributing an article, "Ron Haydock aka Vin Saxon", about the twisted career of novelist-musician Ron Haydock. In 2009, her paperback book company, Kicks Books, launched with the publication of Sweets and Other Stories by Andre Williams. Subsequent books include This Planet Is Doomed (2011), a collection of Sun Ra's poetry; Pulling a Train and Getting in the Wind (2012), previously uncollected short stories by Harlan Ellison; Lord of Garbage by Kim Fowley; Benzedrine Highway by Charles Plymell; and Gone Man Squared by Royston Ellis. Linna also co-authored a biography of Texas musician Bobby Fuller, I Fought the Law, published by Kicks in 2015.

Linna owns one of the world's largest private collections of vintage paperbacks including complete runs of Avon, Beacon, Signet, and others. Her collection includes over 500 juvenile delinquent paperbacks, and she featured the covers of some of them in her book Bad Seed: A Postcard Book, published in 1992 by Running Press. On May 15, 2009, she launched an autobiographical blog, Kicksville 66, documenting everything from Ashtabula angst to her days at the Strand Bookstore. It is illustrated with promo flyers, handwritten letters and photographs.
