= Osees discography =

- Studio albums: 30
- EPs: 8
- Live albums: 7
- Compilation albums: 4
- Singles: 14
- Music videos: 17

American garage rock band Osees have released thirty studio albums, two live albums, four compilation albums, eight extended plays (EPs), thirteen singles, and thirteen music videos.

== Albums ==
=== Studio albums ===
Released as OCS

- 1 (2003)
- 2 (2004)
- Songs About Death & Dying Vol. 3 (2005)
- OCS 4: Get Stoved (2005)
- Memory of a Cut Off Head (2017)

Release as The Ohsees

- The Cool Death of Island Raiders (2006)

Released as The Oh Sees

- Sucks Blood (2007)

Released as Thee Oh Sees

- The Master's Bedroom Is Worth Spending a Night In (2008)
- Help (2009)
- Dog Poison (2009)
- Warm Slime (2010)
- Castlemania (2011)
- Carrion Crawler/The Dream (2011)
- Putrifiers II (2012)
- Floating Coffin (2013)
- Drop (2014)
- Mutilator Defeated at Last (2015)
- A Weird Exits (2016)
- An Odd Entrances (2016)

Released as Oh Sees

- Orc (2017)
- Smote Reverser (2018)
- Face Stabber (2019)

Released as Osees

- Protean Threat (2020)
- Metamorphosed (2020)
- Panther Rotate (2020)
- Weirdo Hairdo (2020)
- A Foul Form (2022)
- Intercepted Message (2023)
- Sorcs 80 (2024)
- Abomination Revealed at Last (2025)
- Off Course (2026)

=== Live albums ===
- Thee Hounds of Foggy Notion (2008) Tomlab Records / Captcha Records / Castle Face Records (as Thee Oh Sees)
- Live in San Francisco (2016) Castle Face (as Thee Oh Sees)
- Live In San Francisco (2018) Rock Is Hell Records (as OCS)
- Levitation Sessions (2020) The Reverberation Appreciation Society (as Osees)
- Live at Big Sur (2020) Castle Face / Spiritual Pajamas (LP Version) (as Osees)
- Levitation Sessions II (2021) The Reverberation Appreciation Society (as Osees)
- The Chapel, SF 10.2.19 (2021) Castle Face, Silver Current (as Oh Sees)
- Live at Levitation (2012) (2023) The Reverberation Appreciation Society (as Thee Oh Sees)
- Live at Permanent Records (2024) Rock Is Hell (as OCS)
- Sorcs 80 Live (2024) Castle Face (as Osees)
- Live at the Broad Museum (2025) Deathgod Corp (as Osees)
- Live in Los Angeles (2026) Deathgod Corp (as Osees)

=== Compilation albums ===
- Zork's Tape Bruise (Home Demos LP / Singles Collection CD), 2009, Kill Shaman Records / No Coast Records
- Singles Collection: Vol 1 & 2, 2011, Castle Face Records
- Putrifiers II Demos (Australian bonus CD / online release), 2012, Castle Face Records
- Singles Collection Volume 3 (2013)

=== EPs ===
- Live @ Yerba Buena Center for the Arts, 2005, Faux Fetus (online EP)
- Grave Blockers EP, 2006, Rock Is Hell Records (6-inch lathe-cut vinyl record and a 3-inch CDr, limited edition of 51)
- Demos EP, 2007, Castle-Face (online iTunes/Amazon EP)
- Peanut Butter Oven EP, 2008, Awesome Vistas
- Split EP with The Intelligence, 2008, Mt. St. Mtn.
- Quadrospazzed '09 (one sided 45 rpm 12-inch record), 2010, Castle Face Records
- Split EP with Total Control, 2011, Castle Face Records
- Moon Sick, 2013, Castle Face Records
- Cara Maluco, 2026, Deathgod Corp

== Singles ==
=== 7-inch records ===
- "Carol Ann" / "Bloody Water", 2008, Slowboy Records
- "Tidal Wave" / "Heart Sweats", 2009, Woodsist Records
- Jay Reatard / Thee Oh Sees Tour Split, 2009, Shattered Records
- Thee Oh Sees / Ty Segall Split, 2009, Castle Face Records
- In the Shadow of the Giant (Sub Pop Singles Club 3.0), 2009, Sub Pop Records
- "Blood In Your Ear" / "Friends Defined", 2009, Rock Is Hell Records (as Thee Ohsees)
- Thee Oh Sees / Paul Cary Split, 2009, Stankhouse Records
- Grave Blockers EP, 2x7" reissue, 2010, Rock Is Hell Records
- Thee Oh Sees / Ty Segall Bruise Cruise, Vol. 1 Split, 2011, 453 Music
- Thee Oh Sees / Quintron Bruise Cruise Split, 2012, 453 Music
- Thee Oh Sees / The Mallard Split, LAMC Series Vol 3, 2012, Famous Class Records
- "There Is A Balm In Gilead", 2013, Castle Face – limited edition
- "Fortress" / "Man in a Suitcase", 2016, Castle Face
- "Ticklish Warrior (Live In San Francisco)", 2016, Castle Face – limited edition
- "Classic Bananas", 2016, Castle Face – limited edition
- "Dark Weald", 2020, Philthy Phonographic Records (7-inch lathe cut)

=== 12-inch records ===
- "Dead Medic" / "A Few Days of Reflection", 2017, Castle Face (as Oh Sees)
- "Clearly Invisible", 2018, Castle Face (as Oh Sees)
- The 12" Synth, 2019, Castle Face (as Osees)

== Compilations appearances ==
This list generally excludes album tracks that have also appeared on compilations. As with the 7-inch singles, many of these tracks have subsequently been included on the band's Singles Collection series.

- You're Soaking in It, 1997, Load Records ("Chinese Probe", same as "Intermission" from the album 2 as Oronoka Crash Suite)
- U.S. Pop Life Vol.11: Looking for the Perfect Glass - California Post Punk, 2001, Contact Records (as OCS)
- Love And Circuits, A Cardboard Records Compilation: From Aa to Zs, 2005, Cardboard Records
- The World's Lousy With Ideas Vol. 8, 2009, Almost Ready Records ("Schwag Rifles" as Thee Oh Sees)
- In A Cloud: New Sounds From San Francisco, 2010, Secret Seven Records ("Contraption" as Thee Oh Sees)
- Castle Face Group Flex, Vol. 1, 2011, Castle Face (Two covers, "Burning Spear" and "What You Need" as Thee Oh Sees)
- The Velvet Underground & Nico by Castle Face and Friends, 2012, Castle Face Records ("European Son" as Thee Oh Sees)
- The Wiener Dog Comp, 2012, Burger Records ("Teacher's Holiday" as Thee Oh Sees)
- Castle Face Group Flex II: Son of Flex, 2012, Castle Face ("Always Flying" as Thee Oh Sees)
- Live at Death By Audio 2012, 2013, Famous Class Records ("Lupine Dominus (Live)" as Thee Oh Sees)
- Garage Swim, 2013, Adult Swim ("Devil Again" as Thee Oh Sees)
- The Wiener Dog Comp II, 2013, Burger Records ("On The Verge" as Thee Oh Sees)
- Coming Together for a Cure: Volume Two, 2013, Air House Records ("The Factory Reacts" as Thee Oh Sees)
- San Francisco Is Doomed, 2014, Crime On The Moon ("You Can Have It" as Thee Oh Sees)
- 50 Bands & A Cat for Indiana Equality, 2015, Joyful Noise Recordings ("The Ceiling" as Thee Oh Sees)
- Be Gay, Do Crime!, 2020, Girlsville ("Blood On Your Boots" as Osees)
- Warm 4 Winter Benefit Compilation, 2021, Folx ("Persuaders Up! Experiment" as Oh Sees)
- Dungeons & Dragons Spelljams, 2022, Kill Rock Stars ("Arena of Blood" as Osees)
- Everything Depends On Us: Zebulon L.A. Live Recording Vol. 1, 2024, Zebulon ("Terminal Jape (Live)" as Osees)

== Music videos ==
- "Block of Ice" (2008)
- "Meat Step Lively" (2009)
- "Chem-Farmer" (2011)
- "I Need Seed" (2011)
- "Lupine Dominus" (2012)
- "Minotaur" (2013)
- "Toe Cutter, Thumb Buster" (2013)
- "The Lens" (2014)
- "Drop" (2014)
- "Dead Man's Gun" (2016)
- "Gelatinous Cube" (2017)
- "Nite Expo" (2017)
- "Drowned Beast" (2017)
- "Anthemic Aggressor" (2018)
- "Overthrown" (2018)
- "Abysmal Urn" (2018)
- "Enrique El Cobrador" (2018)
- "Poisoned Stones" (2019)
- "Heartworm" (2019)
- "Captain Loosely" (2019)
- "Together Tomorrow" (2019)
- "The Daily Heavy" (2019)
- "Snickersee" (2019)
- "Gholü" (2019)
- "Henchlock" (2019)
- "Red Study" (2020)
- "Scramble Experiment" (2020)
- "Funeral Solution" (2022)
- “Perm Act” (2022)
- “A Foul Form” (2022)
- "INTERCEPTED MESSAGE" (2023)
- "GOON" (2023)
- "STUNNER" (2023)
- "ABOMINATION" (2025)
