= Fortress (Thee Oh Sees song) =

Single by Thee Oh Sees
- B-side: "Man in a Suitcase"
- Released: February 12, 2016
- Studio: The Dock, Sacramento
- Genre: Garage rock, psychedelic rock
- Length: 4:45
- Label: Castle Face Records
- Songwriter: John Dwyer

Thee Oh Sees singles chronology
"The Ceiling" (2015)	"Fortress" (2016)

"Fortress" is a song by American garage rock band Thee Oh Sees, released as a limited-edition single on February 12, 2016 on Castle Face Records. The song, and its b-side, "Man in a Suitcase", were recorded during the same sessions as the band's sixteenth studio album, Mutilator Defeated At Last (2015). "Man in a Suitcase" was performed by the band at several live performances, prior to its release, and is included on the live album, Live in San Francisco (2016).

== Reception ==
In a positive review for Pitchfork, Evan Minsker praised the contributions of drummer Nick Murray and the consistency of Thee Oh Sees' output: "Fortress" isn't an adrenaline rush on the level of "Tunnel Time". It's muscular, sure, but it's also patient—another sign they could keep churning out solid material for years to come." In another positive review, Stereogum's Tom Breihan wrote: "It's a jagged, percussive banger driven by a slashing guitar riff and a storm of drums, and it's very much the sort of thing that will hit like a bomb when they play it live."

== Track listing ==
1. "Fortress" – 4:45
2. "Man in a Suitcase" – 4:11

== Personnel ==
=== Thee Oh Sees ===
- John Dwyer – vocals, guitar
- Tim Hellman – bass guitar
- Nick Murray – drums

=== Recording personnel ===
- Chris Woodhouse – recording, mixing
- John Golden – mastering

=== Artwork ===
- John Dwyer – cover photograph
- Matt Jones – layout
- Adam Beris – Castle Face logo
