= Thee Hounds of Foggy Notion =

Live album by Thee Oh Sees
- Released: August 5, 2008
- Recorded: 2007
- Genre: Psychedelic folk, alternative rock, noise rock
- Length: 48:26
- Label: Tomlab, HBSP-2X

Thee Oh Sees chronology
The Master's Bedroom Is Worth Spending a Night In (2008)	Thee Hounds of Foggy Notion (2008)	Help (2009)

Thee Hounds of Foggy Notion is the title of the August 25, 2008 live CD/DVD release by San Francisco-based rock band Thee Oh Sees. Recorded during their Sucks Blood era in 2007, the performances include songs from previous albums, as well as others that were unreleased at the time. Some of those that had not appeared on any album were later reworked for 2008's The Master's Bedroom is Worth Spending a Night In, here performed in the more subdued psychedelic folk manner which characterized the band's sound during this period. This album was the final appearance of percussionist Patrick Mullins, who left the band after "Sucks Blood".

The live footage on the DVD was filmed over the course of four days in San Francisco. It features the band performing in mostly unconventional locales, such as on the shoulder of a highway and near the beach. The video footage was directed by Brian Lee Hughes.

== Release ==
The first issue of the album was released by Tomlab as a CD/DVD set.. In 2009, HBSP-2X (now known as Captcha Records) issued the album on vinyl in yellow (limited to 300 copies), green, white, and black.

In 2011, Burger Records released a series of cassette tapes by Thee Oh Sees that contained two full-length albums on each cassette. Thee Hounds of Foggy Notion was paired with Dog Poison from 2009. Like the others, it was limited to 300 copies.

== Track listing ==
No.	Title	Original release	Length
1.	"The Gilded Cunt"	The Cool Death of Island Raiders (2006)	2:50
2.	"Island Raiders"	The Cool Death of Island Raiders	3:24
3.	"Ship"	Sucks Blood (2007)	2:32
4.	"Block of Ice"	The Master's Bedroom Is Worth Spending a Night In (2008)	2:27
5.	"Curtains"	debut release	3:05
6.	"Dumb Drums"	The Cool Death of Island Raiders	2:44
7.	"We Are Free"	The Cool Death of Island Raiders	4:07
8.	"Thee Hounds of Foggy Notion"	debut release	1:37
9.	"Make Them Kiss"	Demos EP (2007)	3:54
10.	"Golden Phones"	Sucks Blood	2:59
11.	"If I Had a Reason"	3 & 4 (2004)	2:25
12.	"Highland Wife's Lament"	debut release	3:05
13.	"Dreadful Heart"	3 & 4	3:56
14.	"Ghost in the Trees"	The Master's Bedroom Is Worth Spending a Night In	2:53
15.	"Iceberg"	Sucks Blood	2:55
16.	"Second Date"	3 & 4	3:32

== Personnel ==
Thee Oh Sees

- John Dwyer – vocals, guitar, Vox Jaguar keyboard, cover art
- Brigid Dawson – vocals
- Petey Dammit – guitar
- Patrick Mullins – drums, saw, electronics

Production

- Brian Lee Hughes – director, producer
- James Wall – director of photography
- Akiko Iwakawa – editor
- Patrick Colman – assistant editor
- JJ Golden – mastering
- Matt Jones – layout
