= Live in San Francisco (Thee Oh Sees album) =

Live album by Thee Oh Sees
- Released: July 1, 2016
- Recorded: July 15 - July 17, 2015
- Venue: The Chapel, San Francisco
- Genre: Garage rock
- Length: 58:12
- Language: English
- Label: Castle Face Records

Thee Oh Sees chronology
Mutilator Defeated at Last (2015)	Live in San Francisco (2016)	A Weird Exits (2016)

Live in San Francisco is a live album by the American garage rock band Thee Oh Sees, released on July 1, 2016, as part of the Live in San Francisco series by Castle Face Records. The vinyl release is accompanied by a DVD of the performances, filmed by Brian Lee Hughes.

The album was recorded over three nights in July 2015 at The chapel, in San Francisco, during the band's tour in support of its sixteenth studio album, Mutilator Defeated at Last, and marks the first release to feature drummers Ryan Moutinho and Dan Rincon.

The track, "Gelatinous Cube", subsequently appeared on the band's next studio album, A Weird Exits.

== Track listing ==
No.	Title	Original release	Length
1.	"I Come from the Mountain" (live)	Floating Coffin (2013)	3:20
2.	"The Dream" (live)	Carrion Crawler/The Dream (2011)	5:14
3.	"Tunnel Time" (live)	Floating Coffin	2:35
4.	"Tidal Wave" (live)	"Tidal Wave" (2009) & Singles Collection: Vol 1 & 2 (2011)	3:03
5.	"Web" (live)	Mutilator Defeated at Last (2015)	4:47
6.	"Man in a Suitcase" (live)	"Fortress" (2016)	4:04
7.	"Toe Cutter Thumb Buster" (live)	Floating Coffin	4:25
8.	"Withered Hand" (live)	Mutilator Defeated at Last	3:39
9.	"Sticky Hulks" (live)	Mutilator Defeated at Last	7:37
10.	"Gelatinous Cube" (live)	A Weird Exits (2016)	3:33
11.	"Contraption" (live)	Carrion Crawler/The Dream	15:55

== Personnel ==
Thee Oh Sees

- John Dwyer – guitar, vocals, synth, recording engineer
- Tim Hellman – bass
- Dan Rincon – drums
- Ryan Moutinho – drums

Production

- Chris Woodhouse – recording engineer, mixing
- Eric Bauer – recording engineer
- Bob Marshall – recording engineer
- JJ Golden – mastering
- Brian Pritchard – photography
- Matt Jones – layout
