= Singles Collection Volume 3 =

Compilation album by Thee Oh Sees
- Released: November 25, 2013
- Recorded: 2011–2013
- Genre: Garage rock, psychedelic rock
- Label: Castle Face Records

Thee Oh Sees chronology
Floating Coffin (2013)	Singles Collection Volume 3 (2013)	Drop (2014)

Professional ratings
Review scores
Source	Rating
AllMusic	3.5/5 stars
Consequence of Sound	C+

Singles Collection Volume 3 is a compilation album by the American garage rock band Thee Oh Sees, released in 2013 on Castle Face Records. The album collects various "one-offs, covers, and rarities," released by the band between 2011 and 2013.

== Reception ==
In a positive review for Pitchfork, Jayson Greene praised the accessible nature of the compilation and its predecessor, Singles Collection Vol 1 & 2: "The Singles Collections are a periodic Hoover vac-ing of the couch-cushion change that tumbles from view during John Dwyer's frantic music dispersal, but they are also a service to people on the sidelines like us. They make an excellent tasting-platter way to engage with a band that usually demands steak-for-two (for one) levels of commitment."

== Track listing ==
No.	Title	Length
1.	"Ugly Man"	3:15
2.	"Girls Who Smile"	2:15
3.	"Crushed Grass (demo)"	2:29
4.	"Burning Spear"	2:57
5.	"What You Need"	4:08
6.	"Fbi2"	3:26
7.	"Wait Let's Go"	4:08
8.	"Always Flying"	3:07
9.	"Devil Again"	2:54
10.	"Block of Ice" (Live at SF Eagle)	7:34
11.	"Destroyed Fortress / No Spell" (Live at Death By Audio)	10:19
