= Brigid Dawson =

Musician

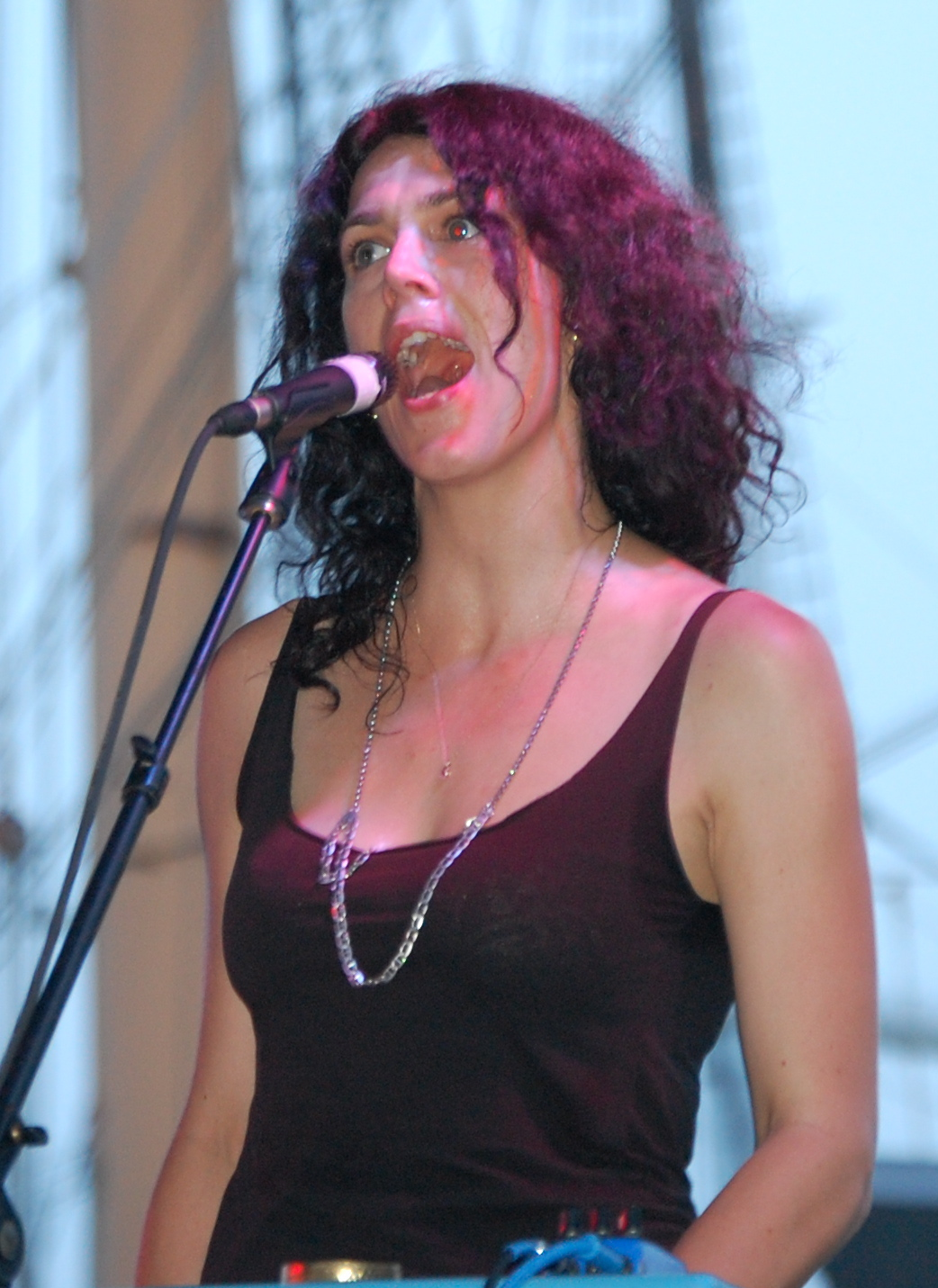
- Dawson performing with Thee Oh Sees in 2010

Background information
- Born: UK
- Genres: Garage rock
- Instruments: Keys, vocals
- Member of: Osees

Brigid Dawson is a musician who sings and plays keyboard and tambourine for Thee Oh Sees. She is noted for her "whimsical" harmonies and is credited with helping front man John Dwyer write melodies. Brigid occasionally performed as "Mix Tapes" with Meric Long of The Dodos. She is a UK native but now lives in San Marin, California.

== Reception ==
Reviewing a show they played in New York, Impose Magazine wrote, "Brigid Dawson's backing vocals are the band's silver lining". Soundscapes noted in an album review, "Once again, Dwyer’s secret weapon is Brigid Dawson, whose vocal interplay gives them a leg-up in the male-dominated garage rock scene." Her voice has been compared to Kim Deal and Exene Cervenka, among others.

== Discography ==
with Thee Oh Sees

- The Cool Death of Island Raiders (2006)
- Sucks Blood (2007)
- The Master's Bedroom Is Worth Spending a Night In (2008)
- Help (2009)
- Dog Poison (2009)
- Warm Slime (2010)
- Castlemania (2011)
- Carrion Crawler/The Dream (2011)
- Putrifiers II (2012)
- Floating Coffin (2013)
- Mutilator Defeated at Last (2015)
- A Weird Exits (2016)
- An Odd Entrances (2016)
- Orc (2017)
- Smote Reverser (2018)
- Face Stabber (2019)
- Off Course (2026)

with OCS

- Memory of a Cut Off Head (2017)

with Permanent Slow Fade

- 'Permanent Slow Fade' (2020)

with Brigid Dawson and The Mothers Network

- Ballet of Apes (2020)

with OSEES

- Off Course (2026)
