= Drop (Thee Oh Sees album) =

Studio album by Thee Oh Sees
- Released: April 15, 2014
- Studio: The Dock
- Genre: Garage rock, psychedelic rock
- Length: 31:12
- Label: Castle Face Records

Thee Oh Sees chronology
Floating Coffin (2013)	Drop (2014)	Mutilator Defeated At Last (2015)

Professional ratings
Aggregate scores
Source	Rating
Metacritic	80/100
Review scores
Source	Rating
AllMusic	3.5/5 stars
Consequence of Sound	A−
Pitchfork	7.8

Drop is the fifteenth studio album by American psychedelic rock band Thee Oh Sees, released on April 15, 2014 on Castle Face Records. Primarily a collaboration between core member John Dwyer and regular collaborator Chris Woodhouse, the album is the ninth to be released under the name, Thee Oh Sees.

The album was released following initial plans for Thee Oh Sees to take "a well deserved break," and was recorded during a "transitional period" for the band. It did not feature contributions from then-band members Brigid Dawson (vocals, keyboard), Petey Dammit (bass, guitar) and Mike Shoun (drums), and, following the album's release, Dwyer reconfigured Thee Oh Sees line-up into a three piece featuring himself, bass guitarist Tim Hellman and drummer Nick Murray for Drop's accompanying tour.

== Background ==
In 2013, Thee Oh Sees released their fourteenth studio album, Floating Coffin, to widespread critical acclaim and extensive touring. In December 2013, at a concert in San Francisco, core member John Dwyer announced to the audience: "This will be the last [Thee] Oh Sees show for a long while, so dig in," fueling speculation that the band was entering an extended hiatus after several years of continuous releases and touring.

Both John Dwyer and vocalist and keyboardist Brigid Dawson left the band's home city of San Francisco at this time, with Dwyer moving to Los Angeles and Dawson to Santa Cruz. Thee Oh Sees booking agent, Annie Southworth, confirmed rumors of a hiatus, stating: "They need a break after five years straight, so, yes – hiatus time. [It] will be a little hard to continue with all the different locales so who know what is going to happen. Cross fingers – we all are – that it's not completely over."

Dwyer, however, noted that the band was not ending. Posting on the band's official website, he wrote: "Dear Oh Sees fans, thank you for all your support. The band is not breaking up. This is just a well deserved break and a transitional period. A new Thee Oh Sees LP will be out in early 2014, and we will see where the live show goes from there. Until then, be well." Reflecting upon the confusion, Dwyer later noted, "I just said I was taking a break while I moved to LA. It was a reboot of my life. I’m older, I need some elbow room. I have nothing bad to say about SF, it was just too damn full."

== Recording ==
Drop is primarily a collaboration between founding member John Dwyer and regular collaborator Chris Woodhouse. The album was recorded in Sacramento, without the participation of then-band members Brigid Dawson (vocals, keyboard), Petey Dammit! (bass, guitar) and Mike Shoun (drums). The duo were joined in the studio by Greer McGettrick, who contributed backing vocals on several songs, and saxophonists Casafi and Mikal Cronin.

Regarding the recording process Dwyer stated: "Me and Chris worked on it together. I wrote a bunch of demos and then brought them to him. We recorded in a studio in Sacramento, an old banana-ripening warehouse. He plays drums and we switch instruments throughout. We recorded fifteen songs and then cut back. Regardless of what people might think about my output, I've tried to be a little bit better at editing."

== Release and line-up change ==
Upon Drop's release, it was announced that Brigid Dawson, Petey Dammit! and Mike Shoun would no longer be performing with the band at live performances. The accompanying tour saw Thee Oh Sees become a three-piece, with Dwyer accompanied by bassist Timothy Hellman and drummer Nick Murray.

== Track listing ==
All tracks are written by John Dwyer.

No.	Title	Length
1.	"Penetrating Eye"	3:23
2.	"Encrypted Bounce"	5:41
3.	"Savage Victory"	4:07
4.	"Put Some Reverb on My Brother"	2:37
5.	"Drop"	2:30
6.	"Camera (Queer Sound)"	3:11
7.	"King's Nose"	3:36
8.	"Transparent World"	3:31
9.	"The Lens"	2:36

== Personnel ==
=== Thee Oh Sees ===
- John Dwyer – vocals, guitars, bass, synth, percussion, Mellotron, noise, band photographs
- Chris Woodhouse – drums, bass, mellotron
- Greer McGettrick – vocals (3, 4, 6), frisbee
- Casafis – baritone saxophone (2, 4, 9)
- Mikal Cronin – alto saxophone (2, 4, 9)

=== Recording ===
- Chris Woodhouse – engineer, mixing, mastering
- Big Bad Bob Marshall – engineering assistant

=== Artwork ===
- Jonny Negron – cover art
- Heidi Alexander – John Dwyer photograph
- Matt Jones – layout
- Adam Beris – castle face
