= Memory of a Cut Off Head =

Studio album by OCS
- Released: November 17, 2017
- Studio: Stu Stu Studio, Los Angeles
- Genre: Freak folk; psychedelic rock
- Length: 44:56
- Label: Castle Face Records
- Producer: John Dwyer

OCS chronology
Orc (2017)	Memory of a Cut Off Head (2017)	Smote Reverser (2018)

Professional ratings
Aggregate scores
Source	Rating
Metacritic	73/100
Review scores
Source	Rating
AllMusic	4/5 stars
Pitchfork	6.5/10

Memory of a Cut Off Head is the twentieth studio album by American garage rock band OCS, released on November 17, 2017, on Castle Face Records. The album is the first to be released under the OCS moniker since OCS 4: Get Stoved (2005), and is their fifth overall to be released under an abbreviated name.

Produced by founding member John Dwyer, the album is primarily an acoustic collaboration between Dwyer and former core member Brigid Dawson. The album features contributions from current and former members of Oh Sees, including Nick Murray and Patrick Mullins, alongside current members Tim Hellman and Tomas Dolas.

== Background and recording ==
Regarding the use of the name OCS and his return to the project's lo-fi roots, John Dwyer noted: "[Oh Sees and OCS] are two different bands honestly. Two different line-ups. The origin of the OCS came from this band [Orinoka Crash Suite]. We just wanted to get back to writing like that. But I also wanted to write a record with Brigid Dawson. I wanted to do something specifically with her. And it ended up being a lot of fun so I’m glad we did it."

== Track listing ==
No.	Title	Length
1.	"Memory of a Cut off Head"	4:47
2.	"Cannibal Planet"	4:29
3.	"The Remote Viewer"	5:27
4.	"The Baron Sleeps and Dreams"	3:34
5.	"On & On Corridor"	5:50
6.	"Neighbor to None"	2:30
7.	"The Fool"	4:41
8.	"The Chopping Block"	3:14
9.	"Time Tuner"	5:57
10.	"Lift a Finger (By the Garden Path)"	4:27

== Personnel ==
Musicians

- John Dwyer – vocals, guitars, Juno Six, electric bagpipes, Mellotron, percussion, The Thing, flute
- Brigid Dawson – vocals, keyboards
- Tim Hellman – bass guitar
- Nick Murray – drums
- Tomas Dolas – keyboards
- Patrick Mullins – singing saw, home-made electronics, Arp Odyssey
- Heather Lockie – string arrangements, viola
- Eric Clarke – violin
- Emily Elkin – cello
- Mikal Cronin – horn arrangements, saxophone

Recording personnel

- John Dwyer – producer, recording, mixing
- Eric Bauer – string recordings
- JJ Golden – mastering

Artwork

- Jonny Negron – cover painting
- Matt Jones – art layout
- John Dwyer – photo of John and Brigid
- Adam Beris – Castle Face logo
