= Coachwhip =

Coachwhip may refer to:

- a type of whip used by the driver of a horse-drawn coach, usually provided with a long lash
- Coachwhip (snake), various North American snakes
- Coachwhip (character), a character of the Marvel Universe
- Coachwhips, a noise/punk band
