= A Weird Exits =

Studio album by Thee Oh Sees
- Released: August 12, 2016
- Genre: Garage rock, psychedelic rock
- Length: 39:30
- Label: Castle Face Records

Thee Oh Sees chronology
Live in San Francisco (2015)	A Weird Exits (2016)	An Odd Entrances (2016)

A Weird Exits is the seventeenth studio album by American garage rock band Thee Oh Sees, released on August 12, 2016, on Castle Face Records. It is the first studio album to feature drummers Ryan Moutinho and Dan Rincon, who joined the band in 2015 to tour in support of the band's previous album, Mutilator Defeated at Last.

A Weird Exits was the first of two studio albums released by Thee Oh Sees in 2016, with a companion album, entitled An Odd Entrances, released on November 18, 2016.

== Background and recording ==
During breaks from the band's extensive tour in support of Mutilator Defeated at Last, the band would jam new song ideas at rehearsals, with vocalist and guitarist John Dwyer recording the ideas onto a cassette to listen to and choose his favourite ideas.

The album and its companion, An Odd Entrances, was mostly recorded as a live band with the band's regular engineer and collaborator Chris Woodhouse. Regarding the recording process drummer Ryan Moutinho noted, "We recorded all of that in three days. Actually... I'm going to say four, but I really think it was three. I was really sick. I had a one-hundred-and-twenty degree fever and was vomiting. I recorded the whole record in a hoody, with the hood up. We went in there, did that, and then me, Tim [Hellman] and Dan [Rincon] all went home, and John stayed and finished it."

== Release ==
The album had two special vinyl editions made: the "Murky Web" edition, limited to 1700 copies, and the "Bloodshot Eyeball" edition, limited to 300 copies. A third was released in the UK, simply titled "Green".

=== Critical reception ===
Professional ratings
Aggregate scores
Source	Rating
Metacritic	82/100
Review scores
Source	Rating
AllMusic	4/5 stars
Pitchfork	7.5/10

A Weird Exits received widespread acclaim from music critics. At Metacritic, which assigns a normalized rating out of 100 to reviews from mainstream critics, the album received an average score of 82 based on 19 reviews, indicating "universal acclaim".

Writing for AllMusic, Tim Sendra praised the album's variety, John Dwyer's guitar playing and the band's consistent output: "With Mutilator, and now this album, the band is firing on all cylinders and then some, making psych-prog-metal-punk jams for the ages."

=== Accolades ===
Accolades for A Weird Exits
Publication	Accolade	Year	Rank	Ref.
Mojo	The 50 Best Albums of 2016	2016	29	
Rough Trade	Albums of the Year	2016	7	
Uncut	Top 75 Albums of 2016	2016	11	

== Track listing ==
A Weird Exits track listing
No.	Title	Length
1.	"Dead Man's Gun"	3:28
2.	"Ticklish Warrior"	3:06
3.	"Jammed Entrance"	5:21
4.	"Plastic Plant"	5:40
5.	"Gelatinous Cube"	3:27
6.	"Unwrap the Fiend Pt. 2"	4:27
7.	"Crawl Out from the Fall Out"	7:50
8.	"The Axis"	6:11

== Personnel ==
Thee Oh Sees

- John Dwyer – guitar, vocals, Mellotron, synths, moisturizer, flute, percussion, band photo
- Tim Hellman – bass
- Dan Rincon – drums
- Ryan Moutinho – drums

Additional musicians

- Brigid Dawson – vocals
- Chris Woodhouse – drums, organ, guitar, percussion
- Greer McGitrick – cello on "Crawl Out from the Fall Out"

Production

- Chris Woodhouse – recording engineer, mixing
- Robert Beatty – art
- Kristin Linney – crowd photo
- Matt Jones – layout
- Brian Lee Hughes – Castle Face photo

== Charts ==
Chart performance for A Weird Exits
Chart (2016)	Peak position
Belgian Albums (Ultratop Flanders)	146
Belgian Albums (Ultratop Wallonia)	105
Dutch Albums (Album Top 100)	188
