= Witch Egg =

Studio album by Witch Egg
- Released: January 22, 2021
- Studio: Stu-Stu-Studio
- Genres: Psychedelic, jazz, garage punk, garage rock, funk, ambient, rock
- Length: 37:50
- Label: Rock Is Hell

Singles from Witch Egg
- 1. "Greener Pools" Released: November 29, 2020; 2. "City Maggot" Released: December 18, 2020

Witch Egg is the debut album by Witch Egg, a side project of Osees' John Dwyer. The album was released on January 22, 2021, via Rock Is Hell Records. The lineup for the album includes Dywer, drummer Nick Murray, saxophonist Brad Caulkins, keyboardist Tom Dolas, and bassist Greg Coates. It was preceded by two singles, "Greener Pools" and "City Maggot", and was received positively by critics.

== Release ==
Witch Egg was announced in November 2020 along with lead single "Greener Pools", accompanied by a statement that the album was "an improvised set of songs by John Dwyer, Nick Murray, Brad Caulkins, Greg Coates & Tom Dolas", and was "recorded and mixed at Stu-Stu-Studio by John Dwyer." This was followed by the release date announcement and release of second single "City Maggot" in December.

On August 6, 2022, the band recorded a live EP called Witch Egg Live featuring four songs from the album. The EP was released on digital and cassette on May 12, 2023.

== Critical reception ==
Professional ratings
Review scores
Source	Rating
Backseat Mafia	8/10
Pitchfork	7.5/10
Uncut	7/10

Pitchfork called the album "an instrumental jazz-garage chimera that's far-out enough to escape predictability and ghoulish enough to go bump in the night." Echoes and Dust called the album "really good", saying, "Water is not limitless. Yet the creative well of Dwyer seems never-ending." Everything Is Noise wrote, "The entire aesthetic on the surface comes across quite heavily and clearly throughout the music. Normally, I tend to accent how an album starts and ends in order to underline what I otherwise refer to as its narrative quality. This isn't an album that relies on such an aspect, nor would it care to unfold itself using any kind of frame which could limit it in any way. This is a record which, I feel, goes out of its way to go somewhere and take us with it. I'm not sure where 'somewhere' is or what it looks like, but it sounds like the contents which we are acquainted with over the course of Witch Egg." Mxdwn.com wrote, "Recently, the less imaginative among us have declared rock music to be dead. Rock music has certainly fallen from its commercial pinnacle, and may now just be another genre in a sea of genres, but guitar-driven music still has gas left in the tank. Look no further than Witch Egg's self-titled record for evidence. It explores the boundaries of both rock and jazz with such frenzied delight that it will whizz by all but the most open-minded of listeners."

== Track listing ==
All tracks are written by John Dwyer, Nick Murray, Brad Caulkins, Tom Dolas, and Greg Coates.

Witch Egg track listing
No.	Title	Length
1.	"Greener Pools"	3:40
2.	"City Maggot"	4:37
3.	"Your Hatless Friend"	5:41
4.	"Witch Egg"	4:36
5.	"Baphomet"	6:49
6.	"Sekhu"	5:15
7.	"Arse"	2:33
8.	"On Your Own Now"	4:39
Total length:		37:50

== Personnel ==
=== Witch Egg ===
- John Dwyer – synthesizers, guitar, electric bass, hand percussion, flute, mellotron, tapes, effects
- Nick Murray – drums, percussion
- Brad Caulkins – saxophones
- Tom Dolas – Wurlitzer piano, clavinet
- Greg Coates – stand-up bass

=== Technical ===
- John Dwyer – recording and mixing engineer, editing
- JJ Golden – mastering engineer
- Dylan McConnell – cover art
- Brian Bamps – typography
- Jochen – layout
