= Permanent Slow Fade =

- Origin: London, United Kingdom
- Genres: Indie; Dream pop
- Years active: 1999–2001
- Past members: Brigid Dawson; Andrew Winter; Michael Pilch; Adrian Winter

Permanent Slow Fade were a four-piece guitar band based in London. They were in existence between 1999 and 2001. Consisting of guitar, bass, drums and vocals they were mainly in the indie/dream pop genre. Their vocalist, Brigid Dawson brought a bluesy-style vocal to the music, which also had hints of psychedelia in it, in a similar vein to singers like Grace Slick.

The group disbanded in late 2001 when Dawson returned to California. Thereafter she joined garage rock band, Thee Oh Sees.

A retrospective compilation of their recordings was issued on vinyl in January 2020, entitled "Permanent Slow Fade", consisting of demos and studio recordings.

== Discography ==
- Permanent Slow Fade (2020)
