= A Foul Form =

Studio album by Osees
- Released: August 12, 2022
- Studio: Stu Stu Studio
- Genres: Punk rock; hardcore punk; noise rock; garage punk; garage rock
- Length: 21:54
- Label: Castle Face
- Producer: John Dwyer

Osees chronology
Weirdo Hairdo (2020)	A Foul Form (2022)	Intercepted Message (2023)

Singles from A Foul Form
- 1. "Funeral Solution" Released: May 16, 2022; 2. "Perm Act" Released: June 24, 2022; 3. "A Foul Form" Released: July 19, 2022

Professional ratings
Aggregate scores
Source	Rating
Metacritic	79/100
Review scores
Source	Rating
Louder Than War	4.5/5
Pitchfork	7.0/10

A Foul Form is the twenty-sixth studio album by American garage rock band Osees, released on August 12, 2022, by Castle Face Records. Continuing the return to the faster, more aggressive punk sound that the band explored on Protean Threat, the album was described by frontman John Dwyer as "Brain stem cracking scum-punk ... an homage to the punk bands we grew up on." The album includes a cover of the Rudimentary Peni song “Sacrifice.”

== Background and recording ==
Inspired by a shared love of punk bands like Crass, Black Flag, and The Stooges, the band recorded and mixed the album entirely at frontman John Dwyer's home basement studio. Dwyer employed various studio techniques that were used in the recordings of various 70's and 80's punk albums, including using minimal amounts of reverb, miking the drums with as few microphones as possible, and plugging guitars straight into a midrange public address system instead of a guitar tube amplifier. Dwyer finished recording vocals and mixing the album over Christmas 2021 while sick with COVID-19, noting that the timing of symptoms gave harsher qualities to his vocal performance, as well as focusing his mixing efforts.

== Track listing ==
A Foul Form track listing
No.	Title	Length
1.	"Funeral Solution"	1:52
2.	"Frock Block"	1:37
3.	"Too Late for Suicide"	3:30
4.	"A Foul Form"	1:51
5.	"A Burden Snared"	1:21
6.	"Scum Show"	1:49
7.	"Fucking Kill Me"	1:40
8.	"Perm Act"	3:52
9.	"Social Butt"	3:20
10.	"Sacrifice" (originally by Rudimentary Peni)	1:02
Total length:		21:54

== Personnel ==
Credits adapted from vinyl record sleeve.

Osees

- John Dwyer – guitar, vocals, synth, mixing
- Tomas Dolas – guitar
- Tim Hellman – bass
- Dan Rincon – drums
- Paul Quattrone – drums

Technical personnel

- Enrique Tena Padilla – editing help
- JJ Golden – mastering
- Dylan McConnell – cover art
- Titouan Massé – inner sleeve photo
- Matthew Jones – layout
- Harry Waine – Castle Face Records logo

== Charts ==
Chart performance for A Foul Form
Chart (2022)	Peak position
Australian Digital Albums (ARIA)	44
Scottish Albums (Official Charts)	20
UK Album Downloads (Official Charts)	39
UK Independent Albums (Official Charts)	6
UK Rock & Metal Albums (Official Charts)	2
