= Panther Rotate =

Remix album by Osees
- Released: December 11, 2020
- Studios: The Sonic Ranch, Stu Stu Studio
- Length: 39:31
- Label: Castle Face
- Producers: John Dwyer; Enrique Tena Padilla; Eric Bauer; Mario Ramirez

Osees chronology
Metamorphosed (2020)	Panther Rotate (2020)	Weirdo Hairdo (2020)

Singles from Panther Rotate
- 1. "Gong Experiment" Released: November 23, 2020

Panther Rotate is a remix album by American garage rock band Osees, released on September 18, 2020, on Castle Face Records. It features experimental reworkings of several tracks from Protean Threat, as well as outtakes and new compositions.

== Critical reception ==
Professional ratings
Aggregate scores
Source	Rating
Metacritic	64/100
Review scores
Source	Rating

Panther Rotate received a score of 64 out of 100 on review aggregator Metacritic based on four critics' reviews, indicating a "generally favorable" reception.

== Track listing ==
Panther Rotate track listing
No.	Title	Length
1.	"Scramble Experiment" (remix of "Scramble Suit II")	5:29
2.	"Don't Blow Your Experiment" (remix of "Don't Blow Your Mind")	5:09
3.	"Synthesis"	2:54
4.	"Toadstool Experiment" (remix of "Toadstool")	5:34
5.	"If I Had an Experiment" (remix of "If I Had My Way")	4:29
6.	"Miz Experiment" (remix of "Mizmuth")	0:51
7.	"Terminal Experiment" (remix of "Terminal Jape")	6:10
8.	"Poem With 2 Horns"	1:57
9.	"Gong Experiment" (remix of "Gong of Catastrophe")	6:54
Total length:		39:31

== Charts ==
Chart performance for Panther Rotate
Chart (2020)	Peak position
UK Independent Albums (Official Charts)	44
UK Record Store Chart (OCC)	4
