= Intercepted Message =

Studio album by Osees
- Released: August 18, 2023
- Genre: Synth-rock
- Length: 41:19
- Label: In the Red
- Producer: John Dwyer

Osees chronology
A Foul Form (2022)	Intercepted Message (2023)	Sorcs 80 (2024)

Intercepted Message is the twenty-seventh studio album by American garage rock band Osees, released on August 18, 2023, by In the Red Records. The release has been given positive reviews by critics.

== Critical reception ==
Professional ratings
Aggregate scores
Source	Rating
Metacritic	84/100
Review scores
Source	Rating
AllMusic	3.5/5 stars
The Arts Desk	4/5 stars
Hot Press	7/10
Loud and Quiet	5/10
Pitchfork	6.9/10
Riff Magazine	8/10

Intercepted Message scored 84 out of 100 on review aggregator Metacritic based on four critics' reviews, indicating "universal acclaim". Edwin McFee of Hot Press called it "a fun romp down memory lane, from a band who refuse to remain in one place for too long" and concluded that "while not everything hits the mark, Intercepted Message is still an enjoyable chapter in the group's storied career". Joe Muggs, reviewing the album for The Arts Desk, described it as "an extremely simple record. It is big, stomping, party-monster neanderthal synth-rock" with "no new sounds [...]: the structures are classic garage punk, [and] the synthesisers' growl and squeal sounds like some jerry-rigged setup from the 1970s". Mark Deming of AllMusic drew comparisons to bands including Devo, the Screamers and OMD, while remarking upon bandleader John Dwyer's "sonic shapeshifting" throughout the album: "On Intercepted Message he's filled the music with enough frantic energy and lyrical urgency that this clearly comes from his musical imagination, even if it explores new territory, and as a loving re-creation of the futuristic sounds of the past, it's well worth a listen."

Riff Magazine's David Gill wrote that the album "tempers the lo-fi punk energy of 2022's Metamorphosed with synthesizers and silliness" and "some of the songs offer obvious, new influences". Guia Cortassa of Loud and Quiet called it "a pity that [Dwyer's] bombastic promises were not kept in the music. However tight and uptempo they may be, the 12 tracks sound tired and knackered almost from the beginning". Pitchfork's Evan Minsker wrote that "from synth pop to new wave to disco, the shapeshifting rock band goes all in on its keyboard album", but concluded that "the threads that bind these songs are loose and inconsistent, which might be given for a band that moves fast and jumps from one subgenre micro-era to the next".

== Track listing ==
Intercepted Message track listing
No.	Title	Length
1.	"Stunner"	2:44
2.	"Blank Chems"	4:15
3.	"Intercepted Message"	3:26
4.	"Die Laughing"	4:10
5.	"Unusual & Cruel"	3:22
6.	"The Fish Needs a Bike" (originally by Blurt)	3:17
7.	"Goon"	2:12
8.	"Chaos Heart"	2:46
9.	"Submerged Building"	2:49
10.	"Sleazoid Psycho"	3:09
11.	"Always at Night"	7:03
12.	"Opus No. 1" (a.k.a. "LADWP Hold")	2:01
Total length:		41:19

== Personnel ==
Osees

- John Dwyer – guitar, vocals, synthesizers, percussion, assorted electronics, production, mixing
- Tim Hellman – bass guitar
- Tomas Dolas – keyboards, cello
- Dan Rincon – drums, percussion
- Paul Quattrone – drums, percussion, electric claps

Additional contributors

- JJ Golden – mastering
- Eric Bauer – mixing, engineering
- Mike Kriebel – mixing, engineering
- Elizaveta Boldyreva – engineering, violin
- Brad Caulkins – tenor saxophone
- Wes Greaves – artwork
- Jon Krop – layout

== Charts ==
Chart performance for Intercepted Message
Chart (2023)	Peak position
Scottish Albums (Official Charts)	89
UK Independent Albums (Official Charts)	17
