= Weirdo Hairdo =

Studio album by Osees
- Released: December 18, 2020
- Genre: Punk rock; psych punk; krautrock; garage punk; garage rock
- Length: 41:32
- Label: Castle Face
- Producer: John Dwyer

Osees chronology
Panther Rotate (2020)	Weirdo Hairdo (2020)	A Foul Form (2022)

Weirdo Hairdo is the twenty-fifth studio album by American garage rock band Osees, released on December 18, 2020, by Castle Face Records. The band described the three-track release as an EP, despite being longer than many Osees LPs at more than 41 minutes.

== Background and recording ==
The band described the album's music as "loose limbed and lysergic."

The song "Don’t Blow Your Mind" is a cover of a 1966 single released by The Spiders, the high school band of Alice Cooper.

== Track listing ==
Weirdo Hairdo track listing
No.	Title	Length
1.	"Weirdo Hairdo"	20:29
2.	"Don't Blow Your Mind"	13:02
3.	"Tear Ducks"	8:01
Total length:		41:35
