= The Master's Bedroom Is Worth Spending a Night In =

Studio album by Thee Oh Sees
- Released: April 8, 2008
- Studios: The Hangar, Sacramento, CA; Stay Gold Studio, Brooklyn, NY
- Genres: Garage rock, psychedelic rock, alternative rock, noise rock
- Length: 46:09
- Labels: Tomlab, Castle Face

Thee Oh Sees chronology
Sucks Blood (2007)	The Master's Bedroom Is Worth Spending a Night In (2008)	Thee Hounds of Foggy Notion (2008)

Professional ratings
Review scores
Source	Rating
Allmusic	link
The A.V. Club	(B+) link
Drowned in Sound	(6/10) link
Pitchfork Media	(7.2/10) link
PopMatters	(3/10) link
Tiny Mix Tapes	link

The Master's Bedroom Is Worth Spending a Night In is the seventh studio album by San Francisco-based rock band Thee Oh Sees. The album was the first to be released under the name "Thee Oh Sees", after the band had previously been known as "OCS", "The Ohsees", and "The Oh Sees". It is their seventh studio album overall.

== Background ==
Their previous album, Sucks Blood, already used the name "Thee Oh Sees" on the interior of both CD and vinyl releases, while the exterior continued to use the name "The OhSees".

This album seems to get its title from The master's bedroom, it's worth spending a night there, a 1920 painting by surrealist Max Ernst. Additionally, the phrase is a line in the Mekons song "Hostile Mascot," from their album Retreat From Memphis.

This album marked the first appearance of Mike Shoun, the drummer that joined the band following the departure of previous drummer, Patrick Mullins. Shoun's arrival marked a change in the band's sound. John Dwyer noted that his style "brought it up to a more party thing". The change in style can be observed in Thee Hounds of Foggy Notion, which was recorded prior to the creation of The Master's Bedroom Is Worth Spending a Night In (both were released in 2008). The songs "Block of Ice" and "Ghost In The Trees" appear on both releases, but the latter performances on The Master's Bedroom... are faster and more rock-oriented. "Two Drummers Disappear" also features Chris Woodhouse as second drummer. Woodhouse was the mix engineer for the twelve of the songs on the album that were recorded in San Francisco. The remaining three tracks, "Graveyard Drug Party", "Maria Stacks", and "You Will See This Dog Before You Die", were recorded in New York City with mix engineers Dave Sitek (of TV on the Radio) and Chris Moore. Jigmae Baer was the drummer for these three tracks, rather than Mike Shoun.

The songs were influenced by a variety of artists, including Adam and the Ants ("Visit Colonel"), Taj Mahal ("Poison Finger"), and Pink Floyd's "The Scarecrow" ("Graveyard Drug Party"). "Ghost In The Trees" was adapted from "Putrifiers" by Yikes, one of Dwyer's previous bands. He would later allude to this work again with 2012's album Putrifiers II. "Block Of Ice" was heavily influenced by Red Krayola's song "Hurricane Fighter Plane" as well as Malcolm Mooney's work with Can. "Block Of Ice" had also appeared on the album Deuteronomy by The Intelligence in 2007. The two bands had toured together, and The Intelligence recorded their cover of the song before John Dwyer had recorded a studio version with his own band. Lars Finberg, the leader of The Intelligence, would later go on to join Thee Oh Sees as second drummer and second guitarist in 2011.

== Release ==
The vinyl pressings of the album have been made in different colors. The initial pressing by Tomlab in 2008 was on purple vinyl, and the second was on black vinyl. In 2010, In The Red Records issued two different pressings. One was a traditional black series, and the other was a limited pressing on clear blue vinyl.

In 2011, Burger Records released a series of cassette tapes by Thee Oh Sees that contained two full-length albums on each cassette. The Master's Bedroom Is Worth Spending a Night In was paired with the following album Help for this series.

== Artwork ==
The cover art was created by William Keihn, who has contributed the cover art to other Thee Oh Sees' albums. Keihn also created the art for Ty Segall's album Melted, which features a similar character in a mask. The album art was originally a gift given to John Dwyer, who in turn requested it to be used for The Master's Bedroom....

The artwork, (along with the artwork from the following album Help) was later included in the cover for Singles Vol. 1 and 2, in the form of marker drawings on two different fans' chests.

== Track listing ==
No.	Title	Length
1.	"Block of Ice"	2:14
2.	"Visit Colonel"	3:32
3.	"Grease 2"	2:47
4.	"Ghost in the Trees"	2:14
5.	"Two Drummers Disappear"	3:58
6.	"Graveyard Drug Party"	3:50
7.	"The Master's Bedroom (Is Worth Spending a Night In)"	2:25
8.	"Grease"	3:10
9.	"Adult Acid"	2:54
10.	"The Coconut"	3:10
11.	"Maria Stacks"	2:17
12.	"Poison Finger"	3:08
13.	"You Will See This Dog Before You Die"	4:08
14.	"Quadrospazzed"	5:03
15.	"Koka Kola Jingle"	1:16

== Personnel ==
Thee Oh Sees

- John Dwyer – vocals, guitar
- Brigid Dawson – vocals, keyboards
- Petey Dammit – bass
- Mike Shoun – drums (1–5, 7–10, 12, 14, 15)

Additional musicians

- Chris Woodhouse – drums (5); various percussion
- Jigmae Baer – drums (6, 11, 13)
- Dave Sitek – Mellotron (6), organ (13)

Production

- Chris Woodhouse – recording engineer at The Hanger (1–5, 7–10, 12, 14,15); mix engineer
- Chris Moore – recording engineer at Stay Gold Studio (6, 11, 13)
- Dave Sitek – recording engineer at Stay Gold Studio (6, 11, 13)
- William Keihn – cover art
- Jan Lankisch – layout
- Archie McKay – photography
