= Sorcs 80 =

Studio album by Osees
- Released: August 9, 2024
- Length: 38:42
- Label: Castle Face
- Producer: John Dwyer

Osees chronology
Intercepted Message (2023)	Sorcs 80 (2024)	Abomination Revealed at Last (2025)

Singles from Sorcs 80
- 1. "Cassius, Brutus & Judas" Released: 07 June 2024; 2. "Earthling" Released: 09 July 2024

Sorcs 80 is the twenty-eighth studio album by American garage rock band Osees, which was released on August 9, 2024, by Castle Face Records.

== Production and composition ==
The project started with four demo tracks created by John Dwyer and keyboardist Tom Dolas using Roland SPD-SX sampling pads, which the pair then pumped up with drumsticks. The chaotic samples were then "glued together" by Tim Hellman's bass guitar and saxophonists CansFis Foote and Brad Caulkins.

Sorcs 80 has elements of soul music, with "Earthling" in particular featuring vocals reminiscent of Kevin Rowland. Saxophone performances were in part inspired by the work of Dexys Midnight Runners and, specifically on "Drug City", evoking James Chance and "landing squarely between no wave and new wave". Pitchfork contributor Stephen Thomas Erlewine felt that SORCS 80 represents a middle ground between the "lacerating punk" of A Foul Form and the "pugnacious synth-pop" of Intercepted Message, diving into electronic music and sampled-based approach without the aid of a single guitar.

== Reception ==
Professional ratings
Review scores
Source	Rating
AllMusic	4.5/5 stars
Pitchfork	7.3/10
Under the Radar	6.5/10

Erlewine expressed fascination by the sound of Sorcs 80 —containing some familiar sounds not rooted in any music genre but put into an unfamiliar form. He also liked the immersive experience of Osees "wrestling with their equipment and forcing it to behave in ways it is not accustomed", populating Dwyer's project with "some of his sharpest recent songwriting". Erlewine singled out “Also the Gorilla…” as a stand out track.

== Track listing ==
Sorcs 80 track listing
No.	Title	Length
1.	"Look at the Sky"	2:28
2.	"Pixelated Moon"	2:43
3.	"Drug City"	2:56
4.	"Also the Gorilla..."	4:11
5.	"Termination Officer"	2:34
6.	"Blimp"	2:49
7.	"Cochon D'Argent"	2:10
8.	"Cassius, Brutus & Judas"	2:48
9.	"Zipper"	3:11
10.	"Lear's Ears"	4:01
11.	"Earthling"	3:32
12.	"Plastics"	1:20
13.	"Neo-Clone"	3:59
Total length:		38:42

== Personnel ==
- John Dwyer – sampler, vocals, mixing
- Tomas Dolas – sampler effects
- Tim Hellman – bass
- Dan Rincon – drums, percussion
- Paul Quattrone – drums, percussion
- Cansafis Foote – baritone saxophone
- Brad Caulkins – tenor saxophone

Additional contributors

- JJ Golden – mastering
- Bruce Riley – artwork
- Jay Beckley – layout

== Charts ==
Chart performance for Sorcs 80
Chart (2024)	Peak position
Scottish Albums (Official Charts)	58
