= 2 (Thee Oh Sees album) =

Studio album by OCS
- Released: June 14, 2004
- Recorded: 2001–2003
- Genre: Freak folk
- Length: 52:18
- Label: Narnack
- Producer: John Dwyer

OCS chronology
1 (2003)	2 (2004)	Songs About Death & Dying Vol. 3 (2005)

2 is the second studio album by American garage rock band Osees, released on June 14, 2004, on Narnack Records. Released under the name, OCS, the album was recorded entirely by John Dwyer as a side-project to his then-primary band, Coachwhips.

== Critical reception ==
In a positive review for Allmusic, Alex Henderson wrote: "2 is perhaps best described as an experimental, oddly appealing mixture of folk-rock and avant-garde noise rock. On these recordings – which were made over a two-year period from 2001–2003 – Dwyer plays a calm, reflective, even pastoral acoustic guitar that interacts with bizarre collages of dissonant electro-noise. [...] This enjoyably intriguing, if slightly uneven, release makes one hope that Dwyer will have more OCS projects outside of Coachwhips."

== Track listing ==
No.	Title	Length
1.	"So I Guess We Can't Hang Out"	2:56
2.	"untitled"	2:02
3.	"untitled"	2:05
4.	"Mike D"	1:31
5.	"Banjo, Sold for Rent"	1:35
6.	"Killed Yourself"	2:28
7.	"You Are 16, I Am High"	1:28
8.	"untitled"	2:04
9.	"608C"	1:36
10.	"Left Me Dry"	2:34
11.	"untitled"	1:38
12.	"Intermission"	2:46
13.	"Bisbee"	2:27
14.	"Fretting and Fussing"	3:05
15.	"I Would Drown In Regret"	2:16
16.	"untitled"	2:09
17.	"No Bitches On This Train"	1:49
18.	"Bisbee 2"	2:31
19.	"untitled"	2:58
20.	"Fearless"	4:14
21.	"Our Lovesong"	2:00
22.	"JPD, A Young Man, Tells Goldylox Thanksss"	4:06

== Personnel ==
- John Dwyer – all instruments, recording
- Chiara Giovando (credited as Chiara G) – additional performing (13)
