= Chris Woodhouse =

American record producer and musician

- Genres: Garage rock, experimental rock
- Occupations: Recording engineer, record producer, musician
- Instruments: Drums, bass guitar, keyboards, guitar, percussion
- Formerly of: The Intelligence

Chris Woodhouse is an American recording engineer, record producer and multi-instrumentalist. He is best known for his work with the San Francisco-based garage rock acts, Thee Oh Sees, Ty Segall, The Intelligence, Sic Alps and Fuzz.

Alongside his recording duties, Woodhouse is a former member of both The Intelligence and Mayyors, and often contributes musically to Thee Oh Sees. He was listed as a full contributing band member on the band's studio albums, Drop (2014) and Mutilator Defeated At Last (2015).

== Career ==
Woodhouse's former "home base" studio was The Dock in Sacramento, California.

== Discography ==
Year	Title	Artist	Credits
1998	Forbidden Fruit	The Bananas	Engineer, mixing
1998	The Great Lost Trouble Makers Album	The Trouble Makers	Producer
2001	A Slippery Subject	The Bananas	Engineer, mixing
2003	Nautical Rock 'N' Roll	The Bananas	Engineer, mixing
2003	Useless & Modern	FM Knives	Engineer, mixing
2003	How to Plan Successful Parties	The Dipers	Producer
2004	Sounds of Violence	Th' Losin Streaks	Producer
2005	Team Sleep	Team Sleep	Engineer, mixing
2005	Take Ecstasy with Me/Get Up	!!!	Guitar, overdubs
2005	I've Visited the Island of Jocks and Jazz	The Hospitals	Engineer, mixing
2006	Nightlife	Erase Errata	Engineer
2007	Sexrat	Sexrat	Mixing
2007	Myth Takes	!!!	Mixing, tracking
2003	New Animals	The Bananas	Engineer, mixing
2008	The Master's Bedroom Is Worth Spending a Night In	Thee Oh Sees	Engineer, mixing, drums, percussion
2009	Help	Thee Oh Sees	Engineer, mixing
2010	Warm Slime	Thee Oh Sees	Engineer, mixing
2011	Wild Flag	Wild Flag	Engineer, mixing
2011	IVXLCDM	Wounded Lion	Engineer, guitar, effects, organ
2011	Castlemania	Thee Oh Sees	Mixing
2011	Carrion Crawler/The Dream	Thee Oh Sees	Engineer, mixing
2012	Under the Water Under the Ground	Lamps	Engineer
2012	Slaughterhouse	Ty Segall Band	Engineer, mixing
2012	Sic Alps	Sic Alps	Mixing
2012	Putrifiers II	Thee Oh Sees	Engineer, bass guitar, drums, percussion
2012	Occupy This Album	Various Artists	Engineer, mixing
2012	Everybody’s Got It Easy But Me	The Intelligence	Engineer
2013	Floating Coffin	Thee Oh Sees	Engineer, mixing, mastering, percussion
2013	Moon Sick	Thee Oh Sees	Engineer, mixing, mastering
2013	Lost Control	Dog Party	Engineer
2013	Disconnect	TV Ghost	Producer, engineer, arranger
2013	Fuzz	Fuzz	Engineer, mixing
2013	Butter Knife	Audacity	Engineer
2013	Live in San Francisco	White Fence	Engineer, mixing
2013	Live in San Francisco	Fuzz	Engineer, mixing
2014	Drop	Thee Oh Sees	Engineer, mixing, mastering, bass guitar, drums, mellotron
2014	Zig Zags	Zig Zags	Mixing
2014	Live in San Francisco	OBN III's	Engineer, mixing
2014	Manipulator	Ty Segall	Producer, engineer, mixing, piano, synthesizer, percussion
2014	Meatbodies	Meatbodies	Mixing
2014	Breakfast of Failures	The Blind Shake	Engineer
2014	Live in San Francisco	Icky Boyfriends	Engineer, mixing
2015	Live in San Francisco	Ty Segall	Mixing
2015	Live in San Francisco	Destruction Unit	Mixing
2015	Golem	Wand	Producer, engineer, mixing
2015	Fight Fire	POW!	Producer, engineer, mixing
2015	Mutilator Defeated At Last	Thee Oh Sees	Engineer, mixing, synthesizer, percussion, mellotron
2015	Cold Hot Plumbs	Damaged Bug	Engineer, mixing
2015	Vol. 4	Dog Party	Engineer, piano, hand claps
2015	Live in San Francisco	The Blind Shake	Engineer, mixing
2015	Vintage Future	The Intelligence	Producer, engineer, mixing, drums
2015	Limbo	Summer Twins	Producer, engineer, mixing, mellotron
2015	As If	!!!	Mixing, guitar
2016	Misery	SCRAPER	Producer
