= Off Course (Osees album) =

Studio album by Osees
- Released: June 5, 2026
- Length: 32:59
- Label: Deathgod

Osees chronology
Abomination Revealed at Last (2025)	Off Course (2026)

Off Course is the thirtieth album by American rock band Osees. It was surprise released June 5 2026 on Deathgod Records.

== Composition and recording ==
The album was recorded at Stu Stu Studios. Regarding the creative process, front man John Dwyer said "We went back to an older method of writing for this one. We jammed and jammed and jammed." Tom Dolas and Brigid Dawson were brought in at the end of the process to help finish the record.

== Critical reception ==
In a 7.6/10 review Stuart Birman of Pitchfork said it "sounds like the sort of album that’s being written on the spot" and added that this quality is what made it a "thrill". The Fire Note gave it a 3.5/5 and noted the album "feels less written than discovered."

Professional ratings
Review scores
Source	Rating
Pitchfork	7.6
The Fire Note	3.5/5

== Track listing ==
No.	Title	Length
1.	"Off Course"	9:17
2.	"Hecete's Reflection is a Trick"	8:43
3.	"The Trick"	6:16
4.	"Syringe"	3:17
5.	"The Brute On His Knees"	5:25
Total length:		32:59

== Personnel ==
Musicians

- John Dwyer - guitar, vocals, keyboards, production, engineering, mixing
- Tom Dolas - keyboards, percussion
- Tim Hellman - bass
- Dan Rincon - drums
- Paul Quattrone - drums
- Brigid Dawson - vocals

Additional personnel

- Enrique Tena Padilla - engineering
- Mario Ramirez - engineering
- Eric Bauer - engineering
- JJ Golden - mastering
- Alex Borrego - artwork
