= Nick Murray (musician) =

American drummer

- Born: Minneapolis, Minnesota, United States
- Genres: Garage rock; indie rock
- Instrument: Drums
- Years active: 2009–present
- Labels: In the Red; Castle Face Records; Wichita; Drag City
- Member of: White Fence
- Formerly of: Thee Oh Sees; The Young Veins

Nick Murray is an American drummer. He is best known as a member of the garage rock band White Fence, and as a former member of Thee Oh Sees, with whom he recorded two studio albums. Murray has also been a frequent collaborator of Tim Presley (White Fence), as well as Welsh singer-songwriter Cate Le Bon, contributing to her solo album, Mug Museum (2013) and with 'DRINKS' (2015), a collaborative project with White Fence's Tim Presley and Cate Le Bon. Murray has also toured with Mikal Cronin and Gold Star.

In late 2009, Murray joined The Young Veins and served as the drummer until the indefinite hiatus announced by bandmate Jon Walker on Twitter, December 10, 2010.

== Biography ==
=== Childhood and early life ===
Growing up in Minneapolis, Minnesota, Murray initially began learning drums at the age of eleven, so he could form a band with his brother: "For the first two years of playing all I had was a snare drum with a mute on it. I learned a lot just on one drum. Until I had a full kit, I set up boxes in place of the missing drums and referenced setups I saw on MTV."

Murray's early influences are Jimi Hendrix Experience's Mitch Mitchell, Sonic Youth's Steve Shelley, and The Smashing Pumpkins' Jimmy Chamberlin.

== Discography ==
John Dwyer / Nick Murray / Brad Caulkins / Tomas Dolas / Greg Coates

- Witch Egg (2021)

PAINT

- Spiritual Vegas (2020)
- PAINT (2018)

Damaged Bug

- Bug On Yonkers (2020)

Shannon Lay

- August (2019)

Thee Oh Sees

- Mutilator Defeated At Last (2015)
- "Fortress" (2016)

OCS

- Memory of a Cut Off Head (2017)

Curtis Harding

- Face Your Fear (2017)

Drinks

- Hermits on Holiday (2015)

White Fence

- For the Recently Found Innocent (2014)
- Live in San Francisco (2013)

Cate Le Bon

- Mug Museum (2013)

Devon Williams

- Euphoria (2011)

Rose for Bohdan

- There it is, The Creeping Moral Decay of the Past Thousand Years (2009)
