= Face Stabber =

Studio album by Oh Sees
- Released: August 16, 2019
- Studio: The Sonic Ranch
- Genres: Progressive rock; psychedelic rock
- Length: 80:22
- Label: Castle Face
- Producers: Eric Bauer; Enrique Tena Padilla; Mario Ramirez; John Dwyer

Oh Sees chronology
Smote Reverser (2018)	Face Stabber (2019)	Protean Threat (2020)

Singles from Face Stabber
- 1. "Henchlock" Released: June 25, 2019; 2. "Poisoned Stones" Released: July 8, 2019; 3. "Heartworm" Released: July 22, 2019

Professional ratings
Aggregate scores
Source	Rating
Metacritic	80/100
Review scores
Source	Rating
AllMusic	4.5/5 stars
Consequence of Sound	B+
Pitchfork	6.6/10

Face Stabber is the twenty-second studio album by American garage rock band Oh Sees, released on August 16, 2019, on Castle Face Records. The album expands on the progressive rock sound that the band explored on their two previous releases Orc and Smote Reverser.

== Background ==
The band described the album's sound as "Soundcloud hip-hop reversed, a far flung nemesis of contemporary country and flaccid algorithmic pop-barf".

== Track listing ==
Face Stabber track listing
No.	Title	Length
1.	"The Daily Heavy"	7:50
2.	"The Experimenter"	5:22
3.	"Face Stabber"	2:45
4.	"Snickersnee"	3:46
5.	"Fu Xi"	5:19
6.	"Scutum & Scorpius"	14:24
7.	"Gholü"	1:51
8.	"Poisoned Stones"	3:55
9.	"Psy-Ops Dispatch"	4:03
10.	"S.S. Luker's Mom"	2:08
11.	"Heartworm"	1:57
12.	"Together Tomorrow"	1:34
13.	"Captain Loosely"	4:25
14.	"Henchlock"	21:02
Total length:		80:22

== Personnel ==
Credits adapted from AllMusic.

Oh Sees

- John Dwyer – guitar, vocals, electronics, synthesizers, percussion, sax, samples, Mellotron, field recording
- Tim Hellman – bass, percussion
- Tomas Dolas – organ, synthesizers, Mellotron, percussion
- Dan Rincon – drums, percussion
- Paul Quattrone – drums, percussion

Additional musicians

- Brigid Dawson – additional vocals
- Brad Caulkins – alto and tenor saxophone
- Mario Ramirez, Enrique Tena Padilla, Eric Bauer – percussion

Technical personnel

- Bernd K. Eisenschmidt – cover artwork, adapted from "Swamp Demon" by Frank Frazetta
- Brian Bamps – Inner sleeve artwork
- Eric Bauer – engineering, mixing, production
- Enrique Tena – engineering, mixing, production
- Mario Ramirez – engineering
- JJ Golden – mastering
- Matthew Jones – layout

== Charts ==
Chart performance for Face Stabber
Chart (2019)	Peak position
Scottish Albums (Official Charts)	80
US Heatseekers Albums (Billboard)	13
US Independent Albums (Billboard)	38
