= Abomination Revealed at Last =

Studio album by Osees
- Released: August 8, 2025
- Length: 35:36
- Label: Deathgod

Osees chronology
Sorcs 80 (2024)	Abomination Revealed at Last (2025)	Off Course (2026)

Singles from Abomination Revealed at Last
- 1. "Fight Simulator" Released: June 25, 2025; 2. "Abomination" Released: July 30, 2025

Abomination Revealed at Last is the twenty-ninth album by American band Osees. It was released August 8, 2025, on Deathgod Corp Records.

== Critical reception ==
Pitchfork in a 7.3/10 review said the album started the band's "return flight to the garage-rock headbanging of their mid-2010s material." They also noticed how the title was somewhat of a mirror of 2015's Mutilator Defeated At Last. The Fire Note, in a 4/5 headphone review called it "messy, jagged, and gripping in the best ways" The Line of Best Fit called it "a solid rumpus."

Professional ratings
Aggregate scores
Source	Rating
Metacritic	81/100
Review scores
Source	Rating
The Fire Note	4/5 stars
The Line of Best Fit	7/10
Pitchfork	7.3/10

== Track listing ==
All tracks are written by Osees.

No.	Title	Length
1.	"Abomination"	1:49
2.	"Sneaker"	3:40
3.	"God's Guts"	1:29
4.	"Infected Chrome"	4:44
5.	"Glue"	5:20
6.	"Ashes 2"	1:08
7.	"Coffin Wax"	2:32
8.	"Ashes 1"	0:55
9.	"Fight Simulator"	4:57
10.	"Protection"	2:02
11.	"Glass Window"	2:53
12.	"Glitter-Shot"	4:03
Total length:		35:36

=== Note ===
- All song titles are stylized in all caps.

== Personnel ==
Credits adapted from the album's liner notes.

=== Osees ===
- John Dwyer – vocals, guitar, synthesizers, recording, mixing
- Tom Dolas – guitar, samples, keyboards
- Tim Hellman – bass
- Paul Quattrone – drums
- Dan Rincon – drums

=== Additional contributors ===
- Enrique Tena Padilla – recording, mixing
- Mario Ramirez – recording
- JJ Golden – mastering
- Tetsunori Tawaraya – art
- Ethan Miller – layout
