= John Dwyer (musician) =

American songwriter

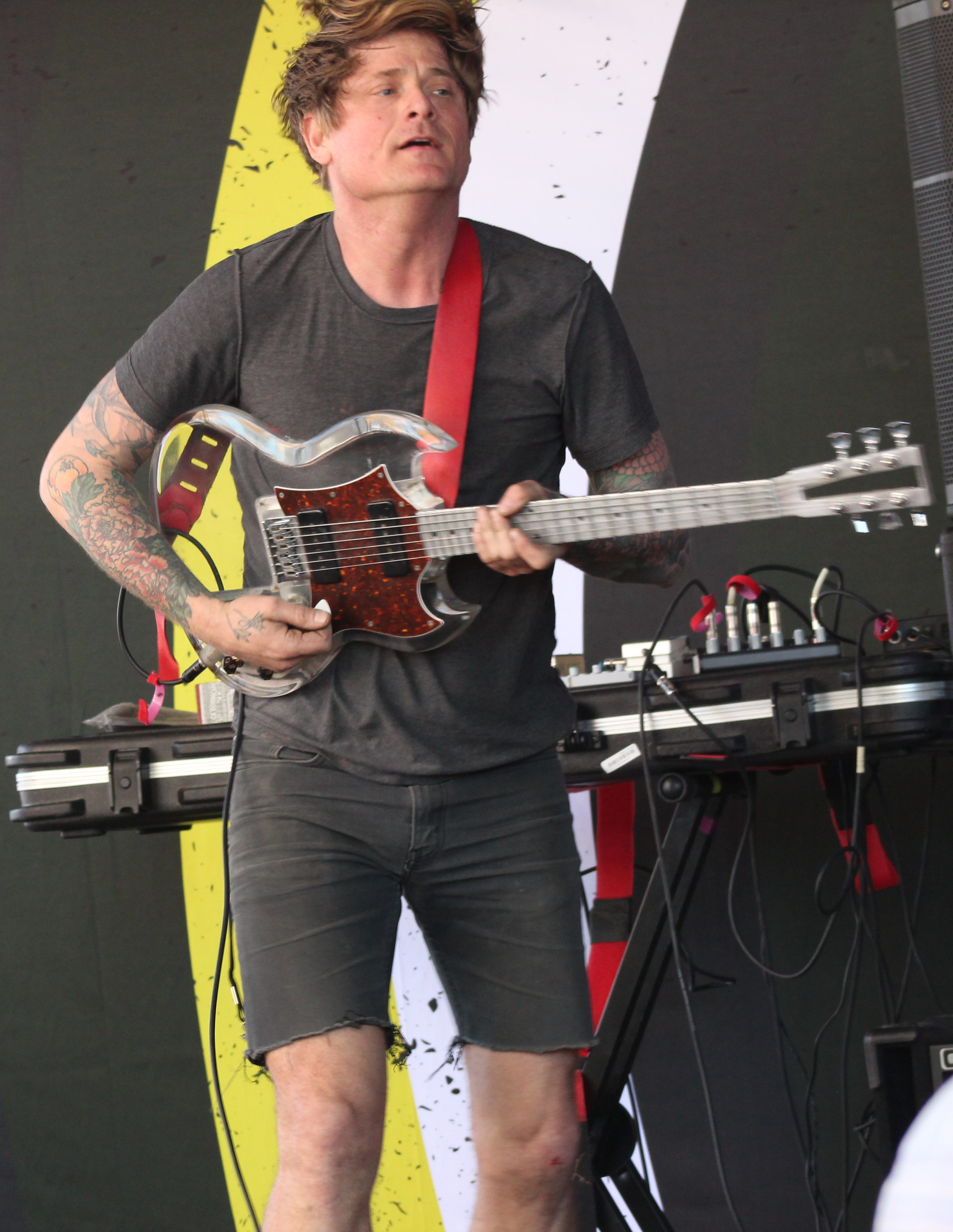

Background information
- Also known as: Damaged Bug
- Born: October 3, 1974 (age 52)
- Origin: Providence, Rhode Island, United States
- Genres: Garage rock, punk rock, noise rock, psychedelic rock
- Occupations: Musician, songwriter, producer
- Instruments: Vocals, guitar, bass guitar, drums, percussion, keyboards, flute, clarinet, saxophone, harmonica, trumpet, cello, synthesizer, Mellotron
- Years active: 1997–present
- Labels: Castle Face Records, In The Red Records, Load Records, Narnack Records

John Dwyer is an American multi-instrumentalist, vocalist, songwriter, visual artist, and record label owner. He is best known as the founding member and primary songwriter of the garage rock band Osees, with whom he has released 30 studio albums. In addition to his work with Osees, Dwyer records solo material under the name Damaged Bug.

He has been in and fronted several underground American bands since 1997, as well as Osees, Dwyer is also a former member of the garage rock acts Coachwhips, Pink and Brown and The Hospitals.

== Career ==
Dwyer formed Osees as a solo project in 1997 before hiring musicians and making Osees into a band. The stable lineup on their early albums included Dwyer, Brigid Dawson, Petey Dammit and Mike Shoun, all of whom left the band when John moved to Los Angeles in 2013.

In 2003, John Dwyer met Brian Lee Hughes while he was filming [Rock Star Scars, which Dwyer contributed Coachwhips music to, as well as having a part in the film. In 2006, Dwyer met Matt Jones at a party, and together, with Brian Lee Hughes, they founded Castle Face Records.

From 2020-2021, Dwyer released several improvisation-based records with a rotating collective of different artists, including "Bent Arcana", "Witch Egg", "Endless Garbage", "Moon Drenched" and "Gong Splat". John Dwyer was one of the curators of the Dutch festival Le Guess Who in November 2021.

== Personal life ==
Dwyer is originally from Providence, Rhode Island, where he first began playing. Dwyer then moved to San Francisco, where he lived for much of his career. By 2017, Dwyer owned a home in Eagle Rock, Los Angeles. He has a rescue dog and two cats owned by a former partner who left them with John after they split up.

Dwyer used to sell marijuana: "Growing up, I used to deliver pot year-round on an old Suzuki GT7570 Water Buffalo motorcycle".

== Discography ==
=== Studio albums ===
==== With Coachwhips ====
- Hands On The Controls (2002)
- Get Yer Body Next Ta Mine (2002)
- Bangers Versus Fuckers (2004)
- Peanut Butter And Jelly Live At The Ginger Minge (2005)
- Double Death (2006)

==== With Pink And Brown ====
- Final Foods (2001)
- Pink And Brown/Death Drug Split 12 inch (2002)
- Shame Fantasy II (2003)

==== With Zeigenbock Kopf ====
- I.D.M. LP (2002)
- Nocturnal Submissions (2003)
- Fuck You to Dust (2006)

==== With The Hospitals ====
- I've Visited the Island of Jocks and Jazz (2005)

==== With Yikes ====
- Whoa Comas or Blood Bomb (2006)
- Secrets To Superflipping (2006)

==== With Dig That Body Up, It's Alive ====
- A Corpse Is Forever (2007)

==== With Sword + Sandals ====
- Good & Plenty (2010)

==== With Osees ====
As OCS

- 1 (2003)
- 2 (2004)
- Songs About Death & Dying Vol. 3 (2005)
- OCS 4: Get Stoved (2005)
- Memory of a Cut Off Head (2017)

As The Oh Sees

- Grave Blockers (2006)
- The Cool Death of Island Raiders (2006)
- Sucks Blood (2007)

As Thee Oh Sees

- The Master's Bedroom Is Worth Spending a Night In (2008)
- Thee Hounds of Foggy Notion (2008)
- Help (2009)
- Dog Poison (2009)
- Warm Slime (2010)
- Castlemania (2011)
- Carrion Crawler/The Dream (2011)
- Putrifiers II (2012)
- Floating Coffin (2013)
- Drop (2014)
- Mutilator Defeated at Last (2015)
- A Weird Exits (2016)
- An Odd Entrances (2016)

As Oh Sees

- Orc (2017)
- Smote Reverser (2018)
- Face Stabber (2019)

As Osees

- The 12" Synth (2019)
- Protean Threat (2020)
- Metamorphosed (2020)
- Panther Rotate (2020)
- Weirdo Hairdo (2020)
- A Foul Form (2022)
- Intercepted Message (2023)
- Sorcs 80 (2024)
- Abomination Revealed At Last (2025)
- OFF COURSE (2026)

==== As Damaged Bug ====
- Hubba Bubba (2014)
- Cold Hot Plumbs (2015)
- Bunker Funk (2017)
- Bug On Yonkers (2020)
- Zuzax (2026)

==== With Bent Arcana ====
- Bent Arcana (2020)
- Bent Arcana / Moon Drenched Sessions Bonus Album (2024)

==== With Witch Egg ====
- Witch Egg (2021)
- Witch Egg Sessions Bonus Album (2024)

==== With Endless Garbage ====
- Endless Garbage (2021)

==== With Moon Drenched ====
- Moon Drenched (2021)

==== With Gong Splat ====
- Gong Splat (2021)
- Gong Splat Sessions Bonus Album (2024)

==== With Posh Swat ====
- Posh Swat (2023)

==== With Ritual / Habit / Ceremony ====
- Ritual / Habit / Ceremony (2023)

==== With Chime Oblivion ====
- Chime Oblivion (2025)

==== With Heathen Axe ====
- Heathen Axe (2026)
