= Bangers Vs. Fuckers =

Studio album by Coachwhips
- Released: January 27, 2004
- Length: 18:11
- Label: Narnack
- Producer: Weasel Walter

Coachwhips chronology
Get Yer Body Next Ta Mine (2003)	Bangers Vs. Fuckers (2004)	Peanut Butter and Jelly Live at the Ginger Minge (2005)

Bangers Vs. Fuckers is the third studio album by the American band Coachwhips. It was released on January 27, 2004, through Narnack Records. On its release, the album received positive reviews from Playlouder, The Guardian and AllMusic.

== Style ==
The Guardian compared the album to music by The White Stripes and Pussy Galore but "lower fidelity" and "lower rent". AllMusic compared the music to that released through Estrus Records.

The vocals by John Dwyer have been described as so "murky and distorted it's a struggle to make out what he's singing about" by The Guardian. AllMusic echoed this statement, noting that only the occasional "Yeah!" or "Baby!" is discernible.

== Release ==
Bangers Vs. Fuckers was released by Narnack Records on January 27, 2004. The album was Coachwhips first album released in the United Kingdom.

The album was remastered and re-issued through John Dwyer's label Castle Face on April 20, 2015.

== Reception ==
Professional ratings
Review scores
Source	Rating
AllMusic	4/5 stars
The Austin Chronicle	3/5 stars
Drowned in Sound	9/10
NOW	4/5 stars
OndaRock	7.5/10
Playlouder	4/5 stars
Spin	A−
Uncut	4/5 stars

Bangers Vs. Fuckers received highly positive reviews from critics in both the US and the UK.

Kitty Empire - writing for The Guardian - gave a positive review of the album, describing it as "short, sharp and to the point, it's all over in 18 minutes. More records should be like this: fun." Playlouder gave the album a four out of five rating, describing it as "primal and raunchy without for one minute leaning toward anything retro." AllMusic gave the album four out of five stars, noting the album as "destructive dance music that's challenging and visceral." The Independent boasted that the music had more to it than it seemed, stating that Bangers Vs. Fuckers was "a lot more involved here than a mere full-frontal assault on your speakers. Pitting superfast garage against amphetamine-paced punk, they manage to create a strange, almost danceable beat." Uncut gave the album a four out of five, stating that it was "an astonishing whirlwind of white keyboard noise and maxi-fuzzed guitar" and "Brutal, but damned impressive."

A mixed review came from The Austin Chronicle's Marc Savlov, whose 3-star review still noted that "[f]ew bands can sound this utterly fucked up without being astonishingly able musicians, and the Coachwhips appear to have bypassed fucked up and gone straight to med school cadavers."

== Track listing ==
1. "You Gonna Get It" - 2:26
2. "Extinguish Me" - 1:58
3. "I Knew Her, She Knew Me" - 1:20
4. "Purse Peeking" - 1:36
5. "Dancefloor, Bathroom" - 2:03
6. "I Drank What?" - 1:16
7. "Evil Son" - 1:38
8. "Thee Alarm" - 1:28
9. "Recline, Recline" - 1:30
10. "Harlow's Muscle of Love" - 2:10
11. "Goodnight, Goodbuy" - 0:46

== See also ==
- 2004 in music

== Credits ==
- Jeremy Harris – photography
- Weasel Walter – producer
