= Smote Reverser =

Studio album by Oh Sees
- Released: August 17, 2018
- Genres: Progressive metal; progressive rock; psychedelic rock
- Length: 59:53
- Label: Castle Face
- Producers: Eric Bauer; Enrique Tena Padilla; John Dwyer

Oh Sees chronology
Memory of a Cut Off Head (2017)	Smote Reverser (2018)	Face Stabber (2019)

Singles from Smote Reverser
- 1. "Overthrown" Released: May 21, 2018; 2. "C" Released: June 25, 2018

Smote Reverser is the twenty-first studio album by American garage rock band Oh Sees, released on August 17, 2018, on Castle Face Records. The album features keyboardist Tomas Dolas, who contributed to 2017's Memory of a Cut Off Head, and subsequently joined the band as a full time member.

== Critical reception ==
Professional ratings
Aggregate scores
Source	Rating
Metacritic	79/100
Review scores
Source	Rating
The 405	6.5/10
AllMusic	4.5/5 stars
The A.V. Club	B+
Clash	8/10
Drowned in Sound	8/10
The Line of Best Fit	8/10
NME	3/5 stars
Paste	8.5/10
Pitchfork	7.6/10
Rolling Stone	3.5/5 stars

Smote Reverser was met with "generally favorable" reviews from critics. At Metacritic, which assigns a weighted average rating out of 100 to reviews from mainstream publications, this release received an average score of 79, based on 18 reviews. Aggregator Album of the Year gave the release a 75 out of 100 based on a critical consensus of 18 reviews.

== Track listing ==
No.	Title	Length
1.	"Sentient Oona"	5:34
2.	"Enrique El Cobrador"	3:53
3.	"C"	4:21
4.	"Overthrown"	2:41
5.	"Last Peace"	7:41
6.	"Moon Bog"	4:56
7.	"Anthemic Aggressor"	12:13
8.	"Abysmal Urn"	3:25
9.	"Nail House Needle Boys"	4:40
10.	"Flies Bump Against the Glass"	4:25
11.	"Beat Quest"	6:04

== Personnel ==
Credits adapted from AllMusic.

Oh Sees

- John Dwyer – effects, guitar, hand percussion, Mellotron, synthesizer, vocals, Wurlitzer electric piano
- Tim Hellman – bass
- Dan Rincon – drums
- Paul Quattrone – drums, timbales

Additional musicians

- Brigid Dawson – backing vocals
- Tomas Dolas – B3 organ, Mellotron, Wurlitzer electric piano
- Heather Locke – sampled viola on "The Last Peace"

Technical personnel

- Matt Stawicki – cover artwork
- Eric Bauer – engineering, mixing, production
- Enrique Tena – engineering, mixing, production
- JJ Golden – mastering
- Matthew Jones – layout
- Brian Lee Hughes – additional photography

== Charts ==
Chart (2018)	Peak position
Scottish Albums (Official Charts)	50
UK Albums (Official Charts)	66
US Heatseekers Albums (Billboard)	1
US Independent Albums (Billboard)	11
US Top Album Sales (Billboard)	99
