= Orc (album) =

Studio album by Oh Sees
- Released: August 25, 2017
- Genre: Garage rock; psychedelic rock
- Length: 50:04
- Label: Castle Face
- Producer: Eric Bauer; Ty Segall; Enrique Tena; John Dwyer

Oh Sees chronology
An Odd Entrances (2016)	Orc (2017)	Memory of a Cut Off Head (2017)

Singles from Orc
- 1. "The Static God" Released: June 7, 2017

Orc is the nineteenth studio album by American garage rock band Oh Sees, released on August 25, 2017, on Castle Face Records. It is the band's first studio album to be released under the name Oh Sees, after it was announced that they would be dropping Thee from their name.

Co-produced by John Dwyer, Eric Bauer, Ty Segall and Enrique Tena, it is the band's first album to feature drummer Paul Quattrone, and is the first album in nine years to not feature recording engineer and regular collaborator Chris Woodhouse.

== Critical reception ==
Professional ratings
Aggregate scores
Source	Rating
Metacritic	79/100
Review scores
Source	Rating
AllMusic	4/5 stars
Pitchfork	7.4/10

At Metacritic, which assigns a normalized rating out of 100 to reviews from mainstream critics, Orc received an average score of 79, based on 18 reviews, indicating "generally favorable reviews".

Among the critics providing praise for the album was Tim Sendra of AllMusic, who stated that "Orc is another classic Oh Sees album that shows no signs of wear and tear anyplace in the operation."

=== Accolades ===
Publication	Accolade	Year	Rank	Ref.
Rough Trade	Albums of the Year	2017	36	
Uncut	Albums of the Year	2017	33	

== Track listing ==
No.	Title	Length
1.	"The Static God"	4:20
2.	"Nite Expo"	2:57
3.	"Animated Violence"	5:06
4.	"Keys to the Castle"	8:10
5.	"Jettisoned"	5:14
6.	"Cadaver Dog"	4:50
7.	"Paranoise"	4:28
8.	"Cooling Tower"	3:35
9.	"Drowned Beast"	5:02
10.	"Raw Optics"	6:22

== Personnel ==
Credits adapted from AllMusic.

Oh Sees

- John Dwyer – guitar, vocals, Mellotron, synths, flute, recorder, fife, hand percussion, Wurlitzer C3, Wurlitzer Electric Piano, sampling
- Tim Hellman – bass
- Dan Rincon – drums
- Paul Quattrone – drums

Additional musicians

- Brigid Dawson – vocals on "Nite Expo", "Keys to the Castle" and "Cadaver Dog"
- Joe Cueto – viola, violin on "Keys to the Castle" and "Drowned Beast"

Technical personnel

- Robert Beatty – artwork
- Eric Bauer – engineering, mixing, production
- JJ Golden – mastering
- Matthew Jones – layout
- Ty Segall – engineering, production
- Enrique Tena – engineering, mixing, production

== Charts ==
Chart (2017)	Peak position
Belgian Albums (Ultratop Flanders)	183
Belgian Albums (Ultratop Wallonia)	181
US Independent Albums (Billboard)	23
US Heatseekers Albums (Billboard)	5
