= Metamorphosed (album) =

Studio album by Osees
- Released: October 16, 2020
- Studio: The Sonic Ranch, Stu Stu Studio
- Genre: Progressive rock; psychedelic rock
- Length: 42:41
- Label: Rock Is Hell
- Producer: John Dwyer; Enrique Tena Padilla; Eric Bauer; Mario Ramirez

Osees chronology
Protean Threat (2020)	Metamorphosed (2020)	Panther Rotate (2020)

Singles from Metamorphosed
- 1. "Electric War" Released: September 23, 2020; 2. "Weird and Wasted Connection" Released: October 6, 2020

Professional ratings
Review scores
Source	Rating
Classic Rock	3.5/5 stars
Mojo	3.5/5 stars
Uncut	7/10

Metamorphosed is the twenty-fourth studio album by American garage rock band Osees, released on October 16, 2020, by Rock Is Hell Records. The album is a mix of songs recorded for the band's 2019 album Face Stabber as well as jam sessions recorded in Mexico during the subsequent tour. It is the second of three full-length albums released by the band in 2020.

== Background and release ==
Metamorphosed was one of two albums announced on the release day of the band's prior album Protean Threat, along with remix-album Panther Rotate. The album opens with three short tracks originally recorded for the band's 2019 release Face Stabber, followed by two extended jam tracks that were recorded in Hermosillo, Mexico. Additional vocals and instrumentation for the jam tracks were completed at John Dwyer's home studio, Stu Stu Studio.

== Track listing ==
Metamorphosed track listing
No.	Title	Length
1.	"Saignant"	1:29
2.	"Electric War"	1:56
3.	"Weird and Wasted Connection"	1:55
4.	"The Virologist"	14:11
5.	"I Got a Lot"	23:10

== Personnel ==
Credits adapted from the vinyl record sleeve.

Osees

- John Dwyer – also recording, mixing
- Tim Hellman
- Tomas Dolas
- Dan Rincon
- Paul Quattrone

Additional musicians

- Caleb Michel – conga

Technical personnel

- Dylan Marcus McConnell – artwork
- Enrique Tena Padilla – recording, mixing
- Mario Ramirez – recording
- Eric Bauer – recording
- Felipe Garcia – recording
- JJ Golden – mastering
- Matthew Jones – layout
