= Songs About Death & Dying Vol. 3 =

Songs About Death & Dying: Vol. 3

Studio album by OCS
- Released: May 30, 2005
- Genre: Freak folk
- Length: 35:20
- Label: Narnack Records
- Producer: John Dwyer

OCS chronology
2 (2004)	Songs About Death & Dying: Vol. 3 (2005)	OCS 4: Get Stoved (2005)

Songs About Death & Dying: Vol. 3 is the third studio album by American garage rock act Osees, released on May 30, 2005, on Narnack Records. Released under the name, OCS, the album was recorded as a duo by John Dwyer and drummer Patrick Mullins, and features experimental freak folk songs.

The album was initially released as a double album, alongside the band's fourth studio album, OCS 4: Get Stoved, and was recorded as a side-project to Dwyer's then-primary band, Coachwhips.

== Reception ==
In a positive review for Allmusic, Alex Henderson wrote: "Dwyer and colleague Patrick Mullins combine that folk-rock influence with bizarre, experimental electro-noise and a very muffled sound. It's a strange mixture, but a strangely appealing one - and most of the time, it works."

== Track listing ==
No.	Title	Length
1.	"If I Had a Reason"	3:20
2.	"Second Date"	3:17
3.	"The Pool"	2:22
4.	"Burning Beauties"	1:48
5.	"Rescue"	2:10
6.	"Here I Come"	2:35
7.	"Greedy Happens"	2:50
8.	"Hey Kid"	1:50
9.	"Bycycle"	3:05
10.	"Split the Take"	3:02
11.	"I'm Coming Home"	2:41
12.	"Oh No Bloody Nose"	1:34
13.	"Lili and Me"	1:55
14.	"I Am Slow"	2:51

== Personnel ==
=== OCS ===
- John Dwyer - vocals, guitar
- Patrick Mullins - drums (1, 2, 7, 9, 12), electronics (3, 10, 14), bells (14)

=== Additional musicians ===
- Mike Donovan - backing vocals (4)
- Matt Hartman - clarinet (3)

=== Recording personnel ===
- John Dwyer - recording
- Weasel Walter - mastering

=== Artwork ===
- David Benzler - skull
- Kottie Paloma - girl
