= Sic Alps (album) =

Studio album by Sic Alps
- Released: September 18, 2012
- Genre: Pop, rock
- Label: Drag City

Sic Alps chronology
| Napa Asylum (2011) | Sic Alps (2012) |

Professional ratings
Aggregate scores
| Source | Rating |
|---|---|
| Metacritic | 72/100 (12 Critics) |
Review scores
| Source | Rating |
| Allmusic | 3.5/5 stars |
| Consequence of Sound | 4/5 stars |
| Pitchfork | 7.9/10 |
| This Is Fake DIY | 6/10 |
| NME | 6/10 |

Sic Alps is the fifth studio album by American rock band Sic Alps. The album has been described to have more of a plot than any of their previous albums.

== Track listing ==
| No. | Title | Length |
|---|---|---|
| 1. | "Glyphs" |
| 2. | "God Bless Her, I Miss Her" |
| 3. | "Lazee Son" |
| 4. | "Polka Vat" |
| 5. | "Wake Up, It's Over II" |
| 6. | "Drink Up!" |
| 7. | "Thylacine Man" |
| 8. | "Moviehead" |
| 9. | "Rock Races" |
| 10. | "See You On the Slopes" |
