= Mutilator Defeated at Last =

Studio album by Thee Oh Sees
- Released: May 18, 2015
- Recorded: The Dock, Sacramento
- Genre: Garage rock, psychedelic rock
- Length: 33:18
- Label: Castle Face

Thee Oh Sees chronology
| Drop (2014) | Mutilator Defeated at Last (2015) | Live in San Francisco (2016) |

Mutilator Defeated at Last is the sixteenth studio album by the American psychedelic rock band Thee Oh Sees, released on May 18, 2015, on Castle Face Records. The album is the tenth to be released under the name, Thee Oh Sees.

The album is the first to feature bass guitarist Tim Hellman, and the only studio album to feature drummer Nick Murray; both of whom joined the band to tour in support of its previous release, Drop (2014). The album also features regular collaborator Chris Woodhouse listed among the band's core line-up, and former member Brigid Dawson returning as the album's backing vocalist.

In February 2016, the band released two unreleased tracks from the album's recording sessions, "Fortress" and "Man in a Suitcase".

== Critical reception ==
Professional ratings
Aggregate scores
| Source | Rating |
|---|---|
| AnyDecentMusic? | 7.6/10 |
| Metacritic | 82/100 |
Review scores
| Source | Rating |
| AllMusic | 4.5/5 stars |
| The A.V. Club | B |
| Consequence of Sound | B |
| Mojo | 4/5 stars |
| NME | 8/10 |
| The Observer | 4/5 stars |
| Pitchfork | 7.8/10 |
| The Skinny | 4/5 stars |
| Tiny Mix Tapes | 4/5 |
| Uncut | 8/10 |

Mutilator Defeated at Last received widespread acclaim from music critics. At Metacritic, which assigns a normalized rating out of 100 to reviews from mainstream critics, the album received an average score of 82 based on 13 reviews, indicating "universal acclaim".

In a positive review, AllMusic's Tim Sendra praised core member John Dwyer's songwriting and the album's overall aesthetic, writing: "Dwyer continues to crank out consistently great to amazing songs and albums that overflow with hot-wired guitars, over-revved vocals, and giant, jagged hooks. [...] After Drop some might have expected Thee Oh Sees to continue to explore their softer side, Mutilator Defeated At Last confounds those expectations. Blows them up, really, in a giant fireball of guitars, noise, and psychedelic power." In another positive review Pitchfork's Aaron Leitko wrote: "As with Drop, this extra polish and attention benefits Mutilator. There are tasteful psychedelic embellishments—synth wooshes, delay trails—and new instrumentation, like electric organ and acoustic guitar. The fuzz and grime have been peeled back a little, leaving room for more density and detail."

NME's Cian Traynor praised the contributions of new members Tim Hellman and Nick Murray, writing: "The new rhythm section of Tim Hellman and Nick Murray slot seamlessly into place, helping bandleader John Dwyer capture a sound that epitomises Thee Oh Sees: tight but unhinged, urgent but infectious." Writing for The Quietus, Nick Hutchings also praised the album, writing: "Thee Oh Sees have a daunting discography, but much like The Fall they offer an entire and immersive universe in which you may not need any other band, or any other sensory sustenance."

== Track listing ==
All tracks are written by Thee Oh Sees.

| No. | Title | Length |
|---|---|---|
| 1. | "Web" | 4:58 |
| 2. | "Withered Hand" | 3:30 |
| 3. | "Poor Queen" | 2:20 |
| 4. | "Turned Out Light" | 2:05 |
| 5. | "Lupine Ossuary" | 4:18 |
| 6. | "Sticky Hulks" | 6:50 |
| 7. | "Holy Smoke" | 2:40 |
| 8. | "Rogue Planet" | 1:56 |
| 9. | "Palace Doctor" | 4:40 |

== Personnel ==
Thee Oh Sees

- John Dwyer – guitars, lead vocals, synths, Mellotron
- Tim Hellman – bass guitar
- Nick Murray – drums
- Chris Woodhouse – synth, Mellotron, percussion
- Brigid Dawson – backing vocals

Production

- Chris Woodhouse – recording and mixing
- Tetsunori Tawaraya – cover artwork
- John Dwyer – photographs
- Doctor Matthew Jones – layout
