= Icky Boyfriends =

- Origin: San Francisco, California, United States
- Genres: Indie rock Fear core Art rock Alternative rock
- Years active: 1989–1995
- Label: Menlo Park
- Past members: Shea Bond (1966-); Anthony Bedard (1965-); Jonathan Swift (1964-)

Icky Boyfriends were a locally noted indie band based in San Francisco from 1989 to 1995. They were the subject of the movie I'm Not Fascinating by filmmaker Danny Plotnick.

Local hit song "Burrito in the Jockstrap", opens their 2 CD retrospective album "A Love Obscene" on Menlo Park Records, released in 2005.

The band reunited in 2010.
