= The Cool Death of Island Raiders =

Studio album by The Ohsees
- Released: March 7, 2006
- Genre: Freak folk
- Length: 36:14
- Label: Narnack Records
- Producer: Dave Sitek, Kyp Malone, Chris Moore, Betty Edwards, Brooke Hamre Gilles

The Ohsees chronology
OCS 4: Get Stoved (2005)	The Cool Death of Island Raiders (2006)	Sucks Blood (2007)

The Cool Death of Island Raiders is the fifth studio album by the American garage rock band Osees, released on March 7, 2006, on Narnack Records. Co-produced by TV on the Radio members Dave Sitek and Kyp Malone, the album was released under the names, The Ohsees and The Oh Sees, and is the first studio album to feature backing vocalist and future keyboardist Brigid Dawson.

The album features mostly freak folk songs, alongside experimental drone compositions.

== Reception ==
Upon the album's release, Pitchfork's Cory D. Byrom gave it a mostly negative review, writing: "Dwyer's work here is a mess. He relies too heavily on the freak half of freak folk, burying the songs in grating arrangements and murky production."

== Track listing ==
No.	Title	Length
1.	"The Guilded Cunt"	2:43
2.	"The Dumb Drums"	2:29
3.	"Turn Offs"	2:04
4.	"Losers in the Sun"	2:24
5.	"Drone Number One"	5:02
6.	"Island Raiders"	4:05
7.	"Cool Deaths"	2:27
8.	"Broken Stems"	3:27
9.	"We Are Free"	4:14
10.	"Drone Number Two"	4:54
11.	"You Oughta Go Home"	2:25

== Personnel ==
=== The Oh Sees ===
- John Dwyer - vocals, guitar, electronics
- Brigid Dawson - backing vocals, tea and biscuits
- Patrick Mullins - drums, electronics, shakers, singing saw

=== Additional musicians ===
- Dave Sitek - piano, electric piano, organ
- Kyp Malone - guitar, backing vocals
- Darren Gardner - violin, slowed-down violin
- Martin Perna - saxophone

=== Recording personnel ===
- Dave Sitek - producer
- Kyp Malone - producer
- Chris Moore - producer
- Betty Edwards - producer
- Brooke Hamre Gilles - producer
