= Help (Thee Oh Sees album) =

Studio album by Thee Oh Sees
- Released: April 28, 2009
- Recorded: The Hangar, Sacramento, CA
- Genre: Alternative rock, garage rock, noise rock, psychedelic rock
- Length: 36:16
- Label: In the Red

Thee Oh Sees chronology
Thee Hounds of Foggy Notion (2008)	Help (2009)	Dog Poison (2009)

Professional ratings
Aggregate scores
Source	Rating
Metacritic	81/100
Review scores
Source	Rating
AllMusic	4/5 stars
The Austin Chronicle	3.5/5 stars
Mojo	4/5 stars
Pitchfork	8.0/10
Tiny Mix Tapes	2.5/5 stars
Uncut	4/5 stars

Help is the eighth studio album by the American garage rock band Osees, released on April 28, 2009, on In the Red Records. It was the band's second album to be released under the name Thee Oh Sees.

== Track listing ==
No.	Title	Length
1.	"Enemy Destruct"	3:19
2.	"Ruby Go Home"	4:21
3.	"Meat Step Lively"	2:48
4.	"A Flag in the Court"	2:02
5.	"The Turn Around"	1:03
6.	"Can You See?"	2:34
7.	"Rainbow"	1:46
8.	"Go Meet the Seed"	5:51
9.	"I Can't Get No"	1:58
10.	"Soda St. #1"	2:38
11.	"Destroyed Fortress Reappears"	5:23
12.	"Peanut Butter Oven"	2:39

== Personnel ==
Thee Oh Sees

- John Dwyer – vocals, guitar
- Brigid Dawson – vocals, keyboards
- Petey Dammit – bass
- Mike Shoun – drums

Production

- Chris Woodhouse – recording, mixing
- William Keihn – artwork
- Archie McKay – photography
