= Protean Threat =

Studio album by Osees
- Released: September 18, 2020
- Studio: Sonic Ranch
- Genre: Avant-punk; garage rock; psychedelia; punk; motorik
- Length: 38:24
- Label: Castle Face
- Producer: Enrique Tena Padilla; Mario Ramirez; John Dwyer

Osees chronology
Face Stabber (2019)	Protean Threat (2020)	Metamorphosed (2020)

Singles from Protean Threat
- 1. "Dreary Nonsense" Released: July 28, 2020; 2. "If I Had My Way" Released: August 13, 2020; 3. "Scramble Suit II" Released: September 2, 2020

Professional ratings
Review scores
Source	Rating
AllMusic	4/5 stars
Exclaim!	7/10
Under the Radar	7.5/10

Protean Threat is the twenty-third studio album by American garage rock band Osees, released on September 18, 2020, on Castle Face Records. Following the band's previous album, double LP Face Stabber, frontman John Dwyer has said that he intended for Protean Threat to be much like a punk album, shorter in length and composed primarily of short songs. It is the band's first full-length album to be released under the name Osees.

== Background and release ==
In an apparent response to the COVID-19 pandemic and widespread cancellation of concerts, the band initially previewed the album in a rough form as a single take live rehearsal video that premiered on YouTube in March 2020, albeit with a different track order.

Two tracks performed during the Protean Threat live rehearsal video but ultimately not included on the album were subsequently released elsewhere. “Dark Weald” came out as a limited edition lathe cut vinyl single on August 23, 2020, and was later released digitally. A cover of the Alice Cooper & The Spiders song “Don’t Blow Your Mind” then came out on the band’s Weirdo Hairdo EP, released December 18. 2020.

On December 11, 2020, Osees released Panther Rotate, a remix album featuring experimental reworkings of several tracks from Protean Threat.

Tracks from Protean Threat were also performed as part of Osees' live recording and subsequent album Levitation Sessions, one of two pay-per-view streamed shows the band put on in 2020.

== Track listing ==
Protean Threat track listing
No.	Title	Length
1.	"Scramble Suit II"	2:27
2.	"Dreary Nonsense"	1:34
3.	"Upbeat Ritual"	2:11
4.	"Red Study"	3:12
5.	"Terminal Jape"	2:20
6.	"Wing Run"	2:06
7.	"Said the Shovel"	4:37
8.	"Mizmuth"	2:09
9.	"If I Had My Way"	2:47
10.	"Toadstool"	4:56
11.	"Gong of Catastrophe"	4:42
12.	"Canopnr '74"	3:00
13.	"Persuaders Up!"	2:23
Total length:		38:24

== Personnel ==
Credits adapted from AllMusic.

Osees

- John Dwyer – guitar, vocals, synthesizers, mellotron, tape effects, percussion, samples, inner sleeve photo
- Tim Hellman – bass
- Tomas Dolas – keyboards
- Dan Rincon – drums
- Paul Quattrone – drums, space drum trigger

Technical personnel

- Dylan Marcus McConnell – artwork
- Enrique Tena Padilla – engineering, mixing
- Mario Ramirez – engineering, mixing
- JJ Golden – mastering
- Matthew Jones – layout
