= Dog Poison =

Studio album by Thee Oh Sees
- Released: September 28, 2009
- Genres: Art punk, garage rock, noise rock, psychedelic rock, experimental, post-punk
- Length: 23:56
- Label: Captured Tracks

Thee Oh Sees chronology
Help (2009)	Dog Poison (2009)	Warm Slime (2010)

Professional ratings
Review scores
Source	Rating
Allmusic	3/5 stars
Pitchfork Media	(6.8/10)
Prefix Magazine	(positive)
Tiny Mix Tapes	3.5/5 marks

Dog Poison is the ninth studio album by the American garage rock band Thee Oh Sees, released in 2009 on Captured Tracks. It is the band's third release under the name Thee Oh Sees.

== Track listing ==
No.	Title	Length
1.	"The River Rushes (To Screw MD Over)"	2:22
2.	"Fake Song"	2:15
3.	"The Fizz"	2:00
4.	"Sugar Boat"	1:59
5.	"Head of State"	2:05
6.	"I Can't Pay You to Disappear"	2:32
7.	"The Sun Goes All Around"	2:23
8.	"Voice in the Mirror"	2:17
9.	"Dead Energy"	2:49
10.	"It's Nearly Over"	3:14

== Personnel ==
All personnel credits adapted from the album's liner notes

- John Dwyer – writer, performer
- Eric Landmark – mastering
- Paul Wackers – cover art
