= Floating Coffin =

Studio album by Thee Oh Sees
- Released: April 16, 2013
- Genres: Garage rock, psychedelic rock
- Length: 39:53
- Label: Castle Face Records

Thee Oh Sees chronology
Putrifiers II (2012)	Floating Coffin (2013)	Drop (2014)

Floating Coffin is the fourteenth studio album by the American garage rock band Thee Oh Sees, released on April 16, 2013, on Castle Face Records. The album is the band's eighth to be released under the name Thee Oh Sees, and their fourteenth studio album overall.

It is the last studio album to feature bassist Petey Dammit! and drummer Mike Shoun.

== Background ==
Frontman John Dwyer described the album as being "heavier" and "darker" than their previous efforts, and that "[The] songs occur in the mindset of a world that's perpetually war-ridden".

All members of the band were part of the recording process that took place in December 2012. The album was created as more of a group effort, John Dwyer stated, "Usually I bring in the [songs] and everybody sort of forms around [them], but this time a lot of this record was written together, as a band, which we haven't done in awhile [sic]." Lars Finberg recorded secondary drums and guitar for the album, but due to engagements with The Intelligence in late 2012 and early 2013, he did not tour with the Thee Oh Sees during the period of the album's recording and release. Because of this, the band's live lineup returned to its previous four-piece incarnation. Guest musician K. Dylan Edrich had previously recorded viola for 2012's Putrifiers II, and did so again for Floating Coffin. The only other guest musician on the album was Kelley Stoltz who played harpsichord.

The album was recorded at The Hangar in Sacramento, CA, with Chris Woodhouse. Woodhouse also played percussion on the album, which he had done on previous releases with the band. This is the first Thee Oh Sees album to also be mastered by Woodhouse. Up until Floating Coffin, he had only recorded and mixed their albums, with the mastering process being handled by a third party.

== Promotion ==
On February 8, the band released the song "Minotaur" for streaming and free download on several music news websites. The band later also released a second track, "Toe Cutter-Thumb Buster" for free. These songs, along with the track "Tunnel Time", had been included in the band's live performances for several months before the announcement of Floating Coffin.

A music video was created for the song "Minotaur", and was directed by John Dwyer and John Harlow. The video features John Dwyer as a minotaur, Brigid Dawson as a woman the minotaur has trapped in its dungeon, Mike Shoun as a brash knight, and Petey Dammit as a cowardly page. The knight and page travel through the woods, trying to locate the minotaur's lair. Upon reaching the maze of the lair, the minotaur beheads the knight, and the page flees with the knight's sword. Meanwhile, the minotaur dreams about a day at the beach with the woman it captured, where she enjoys its company rather than resenting it for holding her against her will. The page builds up the courage to return to fight the minotaur, and kills it in its sleep. The page frees the woman and they escape from the lair into the daylight.

In an uncharacteristic move, the band released a video for a second song on the album, "Toe Cutter-Thumb Buster". This video was directed by John Strong, who also directed the video for Putrifiers II's "Lupine Dominus". The video depicts a man dragging a body to his car.

== Release ==
The album's release was announced by the band in January 2013, and was leaked in its entirety in March.

While the band had previously released material through In The Red Records, John Dwyer decided to self-release the album instead, and said, "I learned a lot from Larry [Hardy, In the Red founder], but I know what I want, and I like to control everything, decide who I'm working with." The album was released through Castle Face Records, a record label he co-owns. The band has not self-released an album since The Master's Bedroom Is Worth Spending a Night In.

Two different vinyl pressings were made. A limited edition run of 500 copies of the album were pressed to clear vinyl, with a red "blood" splatter. This run was shipped before the official release of the album. The other was pressed to traditional black vinyl, and began shipping on the day of the album's release.

The limited edition includes a bonus Flexi disc of the traditional song "There Is a Balm in Gilead", arranged by Brigid Dawson. Unlike the rest of the album (as well as much of Thee Oh Sees catalog), the song was not recorded by Chris Woodhouse, but was instead recorded by Matt Jones, co-owner of Castle Face Records, and member of the band Blasted Canyons.

=== Moon Sick EP ===
The band's Moon Sick EP is made up of four songs that were intended for Floating Coffin, but were not ultimately included on the album. The songs included are "Humans Be Swayed", "Sewer Fire", "Grown In A Graveyard", and "Candy Clock". It was released for Record Store Day 2013, with all proceeds going towards Healthy San Francisco. Like Floating Coffin, this EP was released on Castle Face Records, with versions on both "bone-white" and black vinyl. The song "Sewer Fire" features vocals from Lars Finberg, a first in the band's history.

== Reception ==
Professional ratings
Aggregate scores
Source	Rating
AnyDecentMusic?	7.7/10
Metacritic	82/100
Review scores
Source	Rating
AllMusic	3.5/5 stars
The Austin Chronicle	3.5/5 stars
Consequence of Sound	3.5/5 stars
Exclaim!	8/10
Mojo	4/5 stars
NME	8/10
Paste	8.9/10
Pitchfork	8.0/10
PopMatters	7/10
Uncut	9/10

Floating Coffin has received universal acclaim, with a Metacritic score of 82 out of 100."

Sean Caldwell of No Ripcord praised the album, calling the album "enthusiastic and strange, a perfect good-time balance of the artfully absurd and the sonically robust." Pitchfork's Evan Minsker called Floating Coffin "another resounding success," writing "[F]or an album stuffed with great melodies, smooth transitions, shredding guitar solos, and stellar percussion work [..] it's hard to mind when the lyrics take a backseat. That said, although Floating Coffin does quite well with its searing powerhouses, the quieter moments add a much-needed sonic diversity." Beca Grimm of Paste also praised the album, writing "Coffin is an easy, spring-appropriate listen. Something about Thee Oh Sees always sighs warm air. This album does that, too, but with hurriedly-spiked punch heavy on its breath." Paula Mejia of Consequence of Sound wrote that while some of the tracks were unfocused, the album "is a sign that Thee Oh Sees are far from dead, or burning out. They’re not even close."

== Track listing ==
No.	Title	Length
1.	"I Come from the Mountain"	4:30
2.	"Toe Cutter/Thumb Buster"	3:32
3.	"The Floating Coffin"	2:21
4.	"No Spell"	4:28
5.	"Strawberries 1 + 2"	5:47
6.	"Maze Fancier"	3:16
7.	"Night Crawler"	4:12
8.	"Sweets Helicopter"	2:45
9.	"Tunnel Time"	4:09
10.	"Minotaur"	4:53
Total length:		39:53

Clear/Blood Splatter edition Flexidisc
No.	Title	Length
11.	"There Is a Balm in Gilead" (Traditional)	0:30

== Personnel ==
The following people contributed to Floating Coffin:

Thee Oh Sees

- John Dwyer – vocals, guitar, photographer
- Brigid Dawson – vocals, keyboards
- Petey Dammit – bass, guitar
- Mike Shoun – drums, guitar

Additional musicians

- Kelley Stoltz – harpsichord
- K. Dylan Edrich – viola
- Lars Finberg – second drum kit, bonus guitars
- Chris Woodhouse – hand held percussion

Production

- Chris Woodhouse – recording engineer, mixing, mastering
- Matt Brinkman – drawing
- Matt Jones – layout
