= OCS 4: Get Stoved =

Studio album by OCS
- Released: May 30, 2005
- Genre: Freak folk
- Length: 31:44
- Label: KimoSciotic Records
- Producer: John Dwyer

OCS chronology
Songs About Death & Dying Vol. 3 (2005)	OCS 4: Get Stoved (2005)	The Cool Death of Island Raiders (2006)

OCS 4: Get Stoved is the fourth studio album by American garage rock act Osees, released on May 30, 2005, on KimoSciotic Records. Released under the name, OCS, the album was recorded as a duo by John Dwyer and drummer Patrick Mullins, and features experimental freak folk songs.

The album was initially released as a double album, alongside the band's third studio album, Songs About Death & Dying Vol. 3, but was later released independently on KimoSciotic Records in 2008.

== Reception ==
In a positive review for Allmusic, Alex Henderson wrote of the album's initial release as a double album with Songs About Death & Dying Vol. 3: "3 and 4 has more ups than downs, and Narnack Records deserves credit for documenting more than one side of Dwyer's artistry."

== Track listing ==
No.	Title	Writer(s)	Length
1.	"Wait All Nite"		2:25
2.	"Devil's Last Breath"		1:14
3.	"Tower and the Wall"		3:09
4.	"Friends of St. Thomas"		1:53
5.	"Along the Way.."		1:46
6.	"Crime On My Mind"		3:14
7.	"Get Thy Bearings"	Donovan	2:21
8.	"Harmony & Bells"		2:45
9.	"Head 2"		1:43
10.	"Beginning Burning"		2:39
11.	"Head"		0:56
12.	"Cookie Destroyer"		2:14
13.	"Oh Babe, It Ain't No Lie"	Elizabeth Cotten	2:23
14.	"Dreadful Heart"		3:02

== Personnel ==
=== OCS ===
- John Dwyer - vocals, guitar
- Patrick Mullins - drums, electronics, vocals (12), bells

=== Additional musicians ===
- Mike Donovan - backing vocals (4, 10, 13)
- Matt Hartman - bass clarinet (7, 12)

=== Recording personnel ===
- John Dwyer - recording

=== Artwork ===
- Christopher Garret - cover and insert drawings
