= An Odd Entrances =

Studio album by Thee Oh Sees
- Released: November 18, 2016
- Genre: Garage rock, psychedelic rock, experimental rock
- Length: 29:42
- Label: Castle Face Records

Thee Oh Sees chronology
A Weird Exits (2016)	An Odd Entrances (2016)	Orc (2017)

An Odd Entrances is the eighteenth studio album by the American garage rock band Thee Oh Sees, released on 18 November 2016 by Castle Face Records. The album was recorded during the same sessions as the band's previous album, A Weird Exits, released three months previously.

The album is the band's last with the drummer Ryan Moutinho, who left the band two days before its release, and is also their last album released under the name Thee Oh Sees.

== Critical reception ==
Professional ratings
Aggregate scores
Source	Rating
Metacritic	70/100
Review scores
Source	Rating
AllMusic	4/5 stars
Consequence of Sound	B
Pitchfork	6.7 stars

In a positive review for AllMusic, Tim Sendra praised both the album and the band's overall 2016 output. Discussing the songs, "The Poem" and "At the End, On the Stairs", he wrote, "Both these songs, and the sonic experiments that surround them, boast of just how impressively good Dwyer and Thee Oh Sees were in 2016. Packed full of confident exploration, sonic wizardry, expert guitar manipulation, and tight songcraft, this album of "leftovers" is as good as most of their contemporaries' best work." Noting the band's psychedelic shift in tone, Consequence of Sound's Nina Corcoran favorably compared An Odd Entrances to the band's earlier work, "An Odd Entrances, the companion piece to A Weird Exits, not only expands his songwriting, but it solidifies the band’s lineup, showing Dwyer’s ability to steer Thee Oh Sees towards the other end of frenetics."

== Track listing ==
All tracks are written by Thee Oh Sees, except "Nervous Tech (Nah John)" which is derived from "Go Head John" by Miles Davis.

No.	Title	Length
1.	"You Will Find It Here"	5:58
2.	"The Poem"	3:20
3.	"Jammed Exit"	6:34
4.	"At the End, On the Stairs"	2:45
5.	"Unwrap the Fiend Pt. 1"	3:04
6.	"Nervous Tech (Nah John)"	8:01

== Personnel ==
Thee Oh Sees

- John Dwyer – guitar, vocals, keyboards, flute, percussion
- Tim Hellman – bass guitar
- Dan Rincon – drums, congas
- Ryan Moutinho – drums

Additional musicians

- Brigid Dawson – vocals
- Greer McGettrick – cello
- Chris Woodhouse – keyboards, guitar, percussion
