= Sucks Blood =

Studio album by Osees
- Released: May 15, 2007
- Genre: Freak folk
- Length: 33:26
- Label: Castle Face Records

Osees chronology
| The Cool Death of Island Raiders (2006) | Sucks Blood (2007) | The Master's Bedroom Is Worth Spending a Night In (2008) |

Sucks Blood is the sixth studio album by the American garage rock band Osees, released on May 15, 2007, on Castle Face Records. The album is the band's second to be released under the name The Oh Sees, and is their final album before changing their name to Thee Oh Sees.

== Release ==
To release the album, vocalist and guitarist John Dwyer founded Castle Face Records, alongside Matt Jones and Brian Lee Hughes.

== Track listing ==
| No. | Title | Length |
|---|---|---|
| 1. | "It Killed Mom" | 2:42 |
| 2. | "Sucks Blood" | 3:42 |
| 3. | "Iceberg" | 2:58 |
| 4. | "The Gouger" | 1:53 |
| 5. | "You Make Me Sick, Oh Yeah" | 3:41 |
| 6. | "Untitled Drone #1" | 1:30 |
| 7. | "The Killer" | 3:50 |
| 8. | "Ship" | 2:42 |
| 9. | "What the Driven Drink" | 2:05 |
| 10. | "Invitation" | 3:14 |
| 11. | "Golden Phones" | 3:30 |
| 12. | "Untitled Drone #2" | 1:39 |
