= Sic Alps =

American garage rock band

- Origin: San Francisco, California, United States
- Genres: Garage rock
- Years active: 2004–2013
- Labels: Siltbreeze; Drag City

Sic Alps were an American garage rock band from San Francisco, California. Formed in 2004 by Mike Donovan and Adam Stonehouse, they released music on Siltbreeze, Drag City, Woodsist and several other independent record labels.

After signing with Siltbreeze, the group, at this point a duo consisting of Donovan and Matt Hartman, released U.S. EZ in 2008. A full-length was released on Drag City early in 2011.

Following the band's break-up in 2013, individual members moved on to other projects. Bassist Tim Hellman joined Thee Oh Sees, guitarist Barret Avner joined the post-Royal Trux, Jennifer Herrema led Black Bananas and frontman Mike Donovan released a solo record produced by Ty Segall and later formed the band Peacers with ex-members of Thee Oh Sees.

== Members ==
- Mike Donovan (2004–2013)
- Adam Stonehouse (2004–2005)
- Bianca Sparta (2004–2005)
- Matt Hartman (2005–2011)
- Ty Segall (2009 / 2011)
- Noel von Harmonson (2009–2011)
- Douglas Armour (2011–2013)
- Tim Hellman (2011–2013)
- Barrett Avner (2011–2013)
- Eric Bauer (2011–2013)

== Discography ==
Albums

- Pleasures and Treasures (Animal Disguise, 2006)
- A Long Way Around to a Shortcut (Animal Disguise, 2008)
- U.S. EZ (Siltbreeze, 2008)
- Napa Asylum (Drag City, 2011)
- Sic Alps (Drag City, 2012)

EPs

- Four Virgins split w/ California Lightening (City, 2004)
- The Soft Tour in Rough Form (Mt. St. Mtn, 2006)
- Teenage Alps cassette EP (Animal Disguise, 2006)
- Semi-Streets 7" (Skulltones, 2006)
- Description of the Harbor (Awesome Vistas, 2007)
- Strawberry Guillotine 7" (Woodsist, 2007)
- Fool's Mag cassette EP (Folding, 2008)
- United one sided 7" (Throbbing Gristle cover) (Important, 2008)
- L. Mansion 7" (Slumberland, 2009)
- Split with Magik Markers (Yik Yak, 2009)
- Breadhead (Drag City, 2011)
- Battery Townsley (Drag City, 2011)
- Vedley (Drag City, January 2012)
- She's On Top (Drag City, May 2013)

Compilation appearances

- "Latin" from Hip Hop Shop Sweepers Vol. 1 CD (777was666, 2006)
- "Strepix" from The World's Lousy With Ideas Vol. 8 LP (Almost Ready, 2009)
- "Don't Forget About Jack" from Stuffs LP (Compost Modern Art Recordings, 2010)
- "Anasazi Chemist" from Gaman: A Ceremony for Japan (Electric Temple, 2011)
