= Coachwhips =

American garage rock band

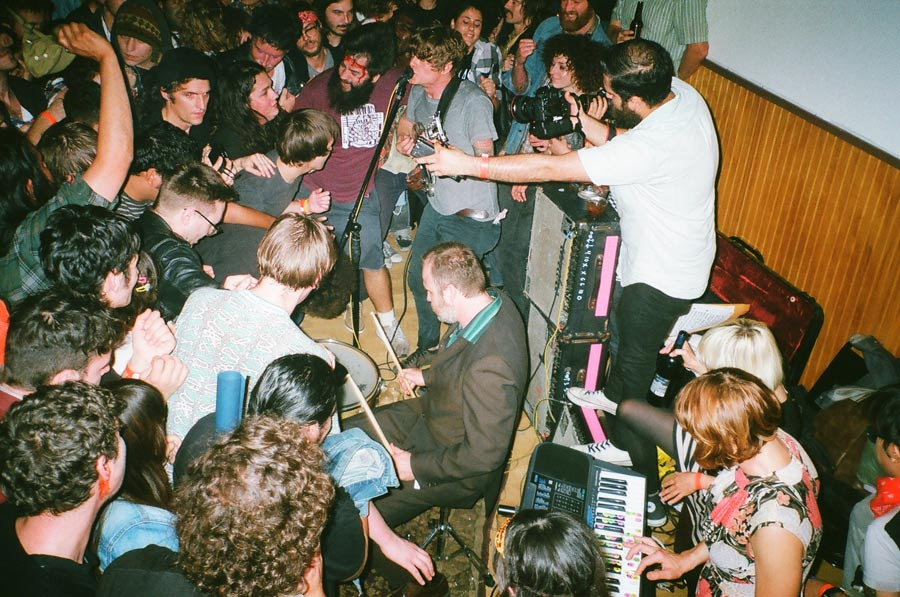
- Coachwhips performing at a reunion show in 2012

Background information
- Origin: San Francisco, California, US
- Genres: Garage punk, noise rock
- Years active: 2001–2005, 2012, 2014
- Labels: Black Apple, Show and Tell, Narnack

Coachwhips was a garage rock band from San Francisco, California, formed in 2001. The band consisted of John Dwyer (vocals, guitar), John Harlow (drums) and Mary Ann McNamara (keyboards, backing vocals, tambourine). In their second incarnation, Val-Tronic played keyboard/tambourine, and Matt Hartman (former guitarist for Cat Power and multi-instrumentalist for Sic Alps) played drums.

Coachwhips are known for their stripped-down, unpolished garage rock and completely unintelligible lyrics, a sound that is similar to the Oblivians and the Gories.

== Band members ==
- John Dwyer - guitar, vocals
- John Harlow - drums (2001–2003)
- Mary Ann McNamara - keyboards, tambourine, backing vocals (2001–2003)
- Matt Hartman - drums (2003–2005)
- Val(tronic) - keyboard, tambourine (2003–2005)

== Discography ==
=== Splits ===
- Split 7" with A Tension (Kimosciotic, 2003, KSR-006)
- Split 7" with Trin Tran (Show And Tell Recordings, 2004, SAT 005)
- Split 7" with Intelligence (Omnibus Records, 2005, omni036)

=== Albums ===
- Hands On The Controls CD (Black Apple Records, 2002, 002)
- Get Yer Body Next Ta Mine LP (Show And Tell Recordings, 2002, SAT 003)
- Get Yer Body Next Ta Mine CD (Narnack Records, 2003, NCK 7002)
- Bangers Versus Fuckers (Narnack Records, 2003, NCK 7009)
- Peanut Butter And Jelly Live At The Ginger Minge LP/CD (Narnack Records, 2005, NCK 7024)
- Double Death CD (Narnack Records, 2006) (a collection of rarities and b-sides, it also comes with a DVD showcasing their live shows.)
- Hands on the Controls LP (Castle Face Records, 2013)

== Equipment ==
In a 2005 interview with SLUG Magazine, Dwyer claims the band steals telephones for use in their music from hotel rooms every time the band stays in a hotel on tour, which he says is why the band is usually not invited back to the hotels they have visited.

== Other sources ==
- Evert. Coachwhips Grunnenrocks.nl. Accessed June 16, 2007.
