= Osees =

American rock band

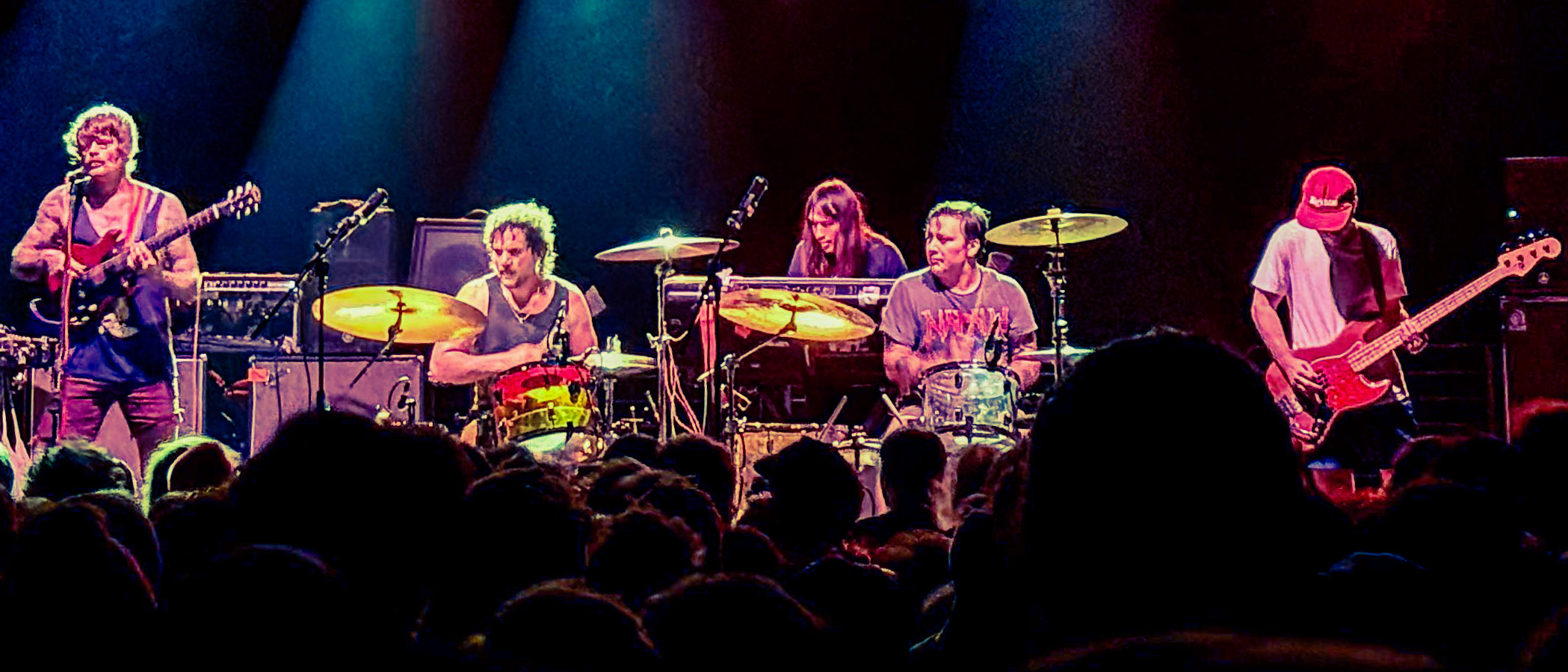
- Osees at Union Transfer in October 2024

Background information
- Also known as: Orinoka Crash Suite (1997–2003); OCS (2003–2005, 2017, 2023); Orange County Sound (2005); The Ohsees (2006); Thee Oh Sees (2006–2017); Oh Sees (2017–2019)
- Origin: San Francisco, California, U.S.
- Genres: Garage rock; psychedelic rock; alternative rock; punk rock; experimental rock; freak folk (early)
- Years active: 1997–present
- Labels: Castle Face; Deathgod Records; In the Red; Load; Narnack; No Coast Records; Rock is Hell; KimoSciotic; Captured Tracks; Flightless
- Members: John Dwyer; Brigid Dawson; Tim Hellman; Dan Rincon; Paul Quattrone; Tomas Dolas
- Past members: Ryan Moutinho; Nick Murray; Petey Dammit!; Mike Shoun; Lars Finberg; Jigmae Baer; Patrick Mullins
- Website: theeohsees.com

Osees is an American rock band formed in San Francisco, California in 1997, now based in Los Angeles, California. Originally the solo recording project of John Dwyer, the band has evolved through numerous line-up and name changes since its founding, with Dwyer serving as the band leader and primary songwriter throughout. Alongside Dwyer, the band's current line-up includes longtime members, Tim Hellman (bass), Dan Rincon (drums), Paul Quattrone (drums) and Tomas Dolas (keyboards). Keyboardist and backing vocalist Brigid Dawson has been a recurring band member and collaborator across its career.

The group's sound draws from a wide variety of influences, including garage rock, krautrock, psychedelia, and folk music. Osees are noted for their prolific recording output, energetic live shows, and off-kilter visual aesthetic. The group has released thirty studio albums, to date, alongside various EPs, singles and compilations.

Initially a solo freak folk recording project, Dwyer evolved the project into a full garage rock band, featuring Brigid Dawson (keyboards, backing vocals), Petey Dammit (bass, guitar), Mike Shoun (drums), and Lars Finberg (drums, guitar), while releasing the acclaimed albums, The Master's Bedroom Is Worth Spending a Night In (2008), Carrion Crawler/The Dream (2011) and Floating Coffin (2013).

After relocating to Los Angeles in late 2013, Dwyer changed the line-up of the band, with Sic Alps bass guitarist Tim Hellman and White Fence drummer Nick Murray replacing Dawson, Dammit!, Shoun and Finberg. Following the release of the band's sixteenth studio album, Mutilator Defeated At Last (2015), Dwyer and Hellman began touring with two drummers, Dan Rincon and Ryan Moutinho, replacing Murray. Touring extensively, this line-up recorded the band's seventeenth and eighteenth studio albums, A Weird Exits and An Odd Entrances, with Moutinho departing in late 2016 to focus on his own projects.

With the arrival of new drummer Paul Quattrone, the band recorded its nineteenth album, Orc, with co-producers Ty Segall, Eric Bauer and Enrique Tena. In late 2017, Dwyer reunited with Dawson for a primarily acoustic album, Memory of a Cut Off Head, which returned to the band's lo-fi roots, and featured several former and current Oh Sees members. After two studio albums featuring a heavy, progressive rock sound—Smote Reverser (2018) and Face Stabber (2019)—the band changed its name to Osees in July 2020, with the announcement of their twenty-third album, Protean Threat. The group continued to release prolifically under the new name, putting out Metamorphosed, alongside a remix album and an EP before the end of 2020. The band's thirtieth studio album, Off Course was released on 5 June 2026, which marks the return of Brigid Dawson since 2019's Face Stabber.

== Name changes ==
The group habitually changes their name between releases, sometimes recording one-off albums under a different name before returning to the previous. At various times, the band has performed or released under the names Orinoka Crash Suite, OCS, Orange County Sound, The Ohsees, The Oh Sees, Thee Oh Sees, Oh Sees, and Osees. Band leader Dwyer has explained that the frequent name changes are done in opposition to the music press: "it seems to aggravate the press, which to me is great. I have nothing but contempt for the music press."

== History ==
=== OCS and freak folk-era (1997–2006) ===
John Dwyer began releasing songs on compilation albums under the name Orinoka Crash Suite as early as 1997, while based in San Francisco. Initially, Osees served as a solo project for Dwyer while he focused on his participation in other groups, including Pink and Brown, and Coachwhips.

The first two Osees albums featured Dwyer as a solo performer, featuring instrumental acoustic songs. The project expanded into a group with the addition of percussionist Patrick Mullins on Songs About Death & Dying Vol. 3. The pair were soon joined by keyboardist and vocalist Brigid Dawson ahead of the project's fifth album, The Cool Death of Island Raiders. Regarding her addition to the band, Dwyer noted: "I met Brigid at the coffee shop Patrick [Mullins] and I used to go to when we were hungover every morning. She mentioned that she had a band too, and I was like, ‘I wanna come and see you’. She said, ‘You’re not gonna like it…’ Whenever someone says that to me it’s a challenge – so we went and it was actually really great. I realised she had a beautiful voice – and almost immediately I realised I wanted to poach her! She’s also a genuinely lovely person, so it was an easy decision."

The group's first six studio albums (and other contemporary output) were recorded in a freak folk style, with lo-fi recording techniques, quiet percussion, and acoustic guitar as the lead instrument.

During this period, Dwyer founded Castle Face Records to facilitate the release of Osees records.

=== Thee Oh Sees and garage rock-era (2007–2013) ===
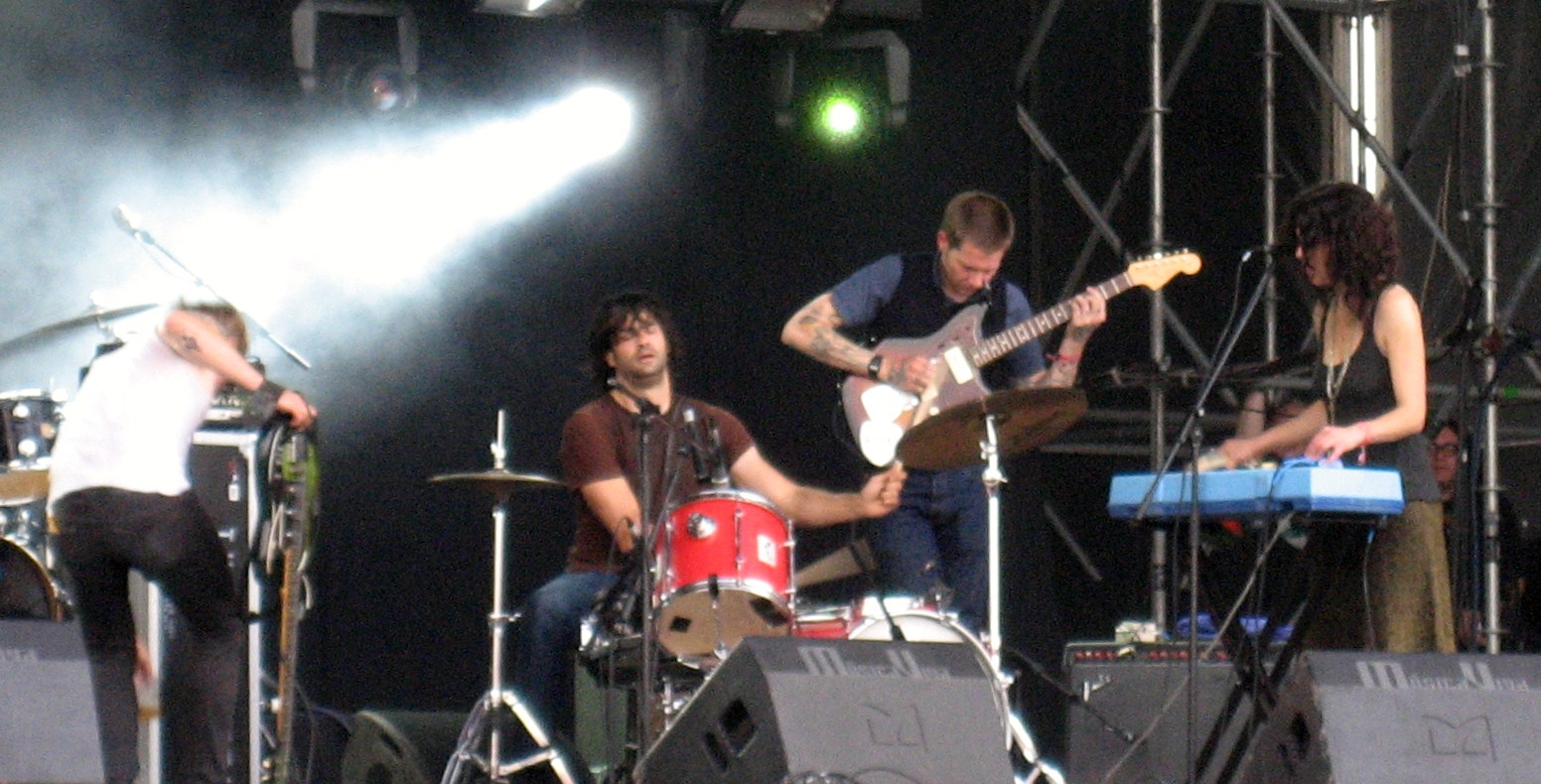
Thee Oh Sees, Primavera 2010

The 2007 release of The Master's Bedroom Is Worth Spending a Night In marked a major stylistic change in the group's music towards a high-energy, garage rock style. The album was the first to feature drummer Mike Shoun on drums and guitarist Petey Dammit!, a lineup that would remain relatively stable until the band's 2013 hiatus. Notably, Dammit! performed bass parts on a standard guitar, doing a "small secret thing" to his instrument to produce a bass sound. Dwyer credited Shoun's playing style as the impetus behind the band's transition to playing more energetic rock.

Osees released some of their most critically acclaimed studio albums under this lineup, including Carrion Crawler/The Dream (2011) — which features live show staple "The Dream", and Floating Coffin (2013).

=== Relocation, line-up change, Oh Sees and Osees (2013–present) ===
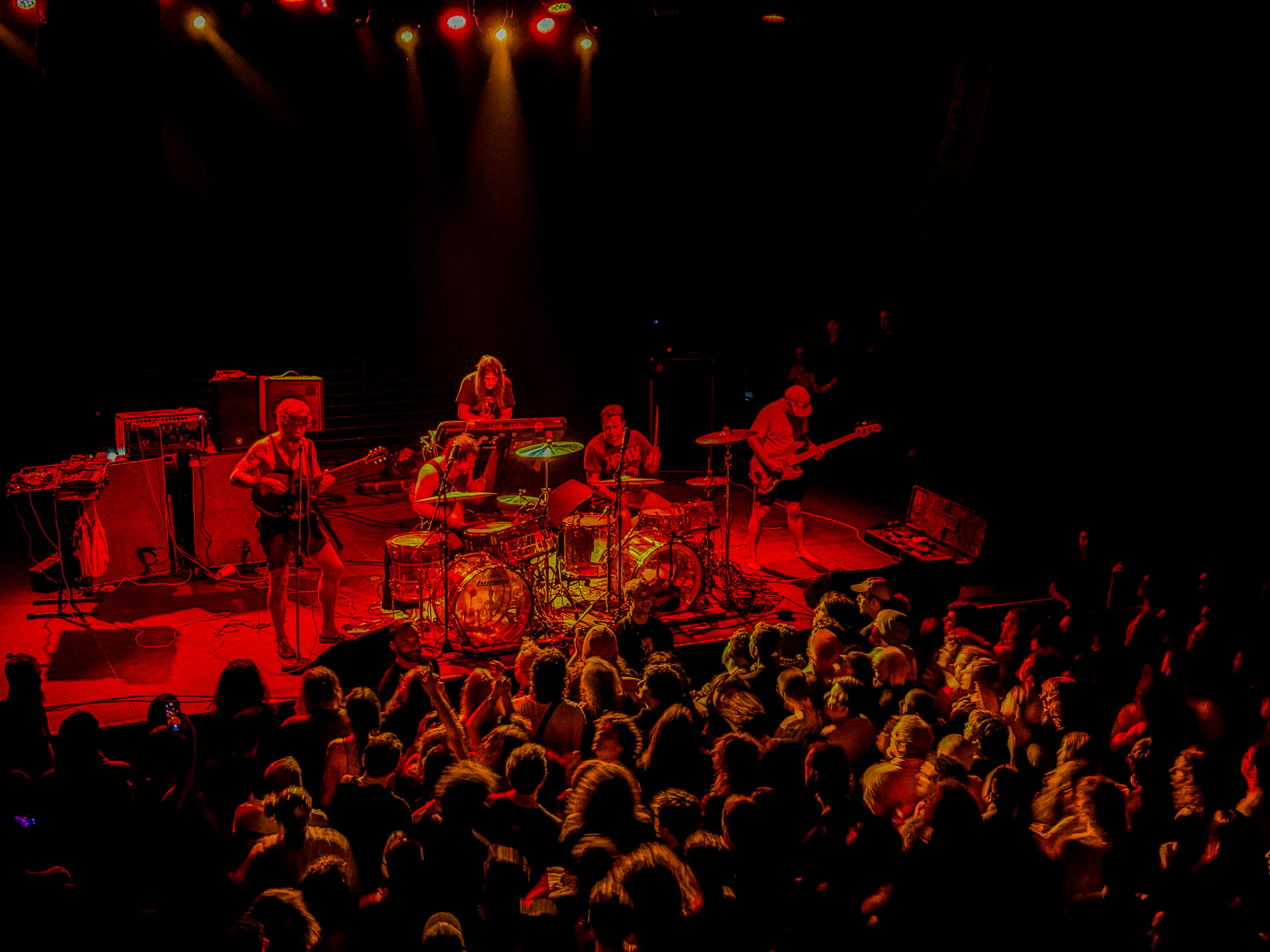
Osees at Union Transfer in Philadelphia, October 2024

In 2013, Dwyer announced a hiatus for Osees as he re-located to Los Angeles. He soon reformed the band with a new lineup, accompanied by a shift to a heavier, garage punk sound.

The current line-up began to solidify during the recording of 2017's Orc. adding a second drummer in Paul Quattrone, and was finalized by the addition of keyboardist (and occasional guitarist) Tomas Dolas during the recording of 2018's Smote Reverser. Since 2017, the group's output has prominently featured the influence of krautrock, with releases and performances typically containing long, improvised, progressive jams. Extended jams are featured with particular prominence on Face Stabber (2019), and Metamorphosed (2020). Some recent releases explore a particular style outside the group's usual repertoire. For example, Panther Rotate (2020) explores remixed music, and A Foul Form (2022) is recorded in a hardcore punk style.

Dwyer continues to occasionally collaborate with ex-bandmember Dawson on Osees releases, most notably on the 2017 release Memory of a Cut Off Head, a one-off return to the band's original freak folk style.

== Philosophy ==
Osees' recording output is notably prolific, so much that it has been parodied in the music press. In a September 2012 interview with New York Music News, Petey Dammit explained the band's philosophy on recording:

We work hard. I think it seems strange for us to release so many records because of the tradition in the recording industry to do things a certain way. For decades it has been months and months in the studio, one release a year, tour this, tour that, do this, do that ... We just do what we want to do. Most of the songs have been worked out by the time we get to the studio so we can record them all live in two days. The other two days in the studio are having fun writing on the spot and having fun.

Regarding the group's tendency towards experimentation in recent years, John Dwyer explains in a 2019 interview:

You don't have to make a boring record when you get old. I feel like people just sometimes lose the fire or get lazy. So we try and get noisier and harder and weirder and longer and more bloated. I just go with my gut.

== Members ==
Current

- John Dwyer – lead vocals, guitar, keyboards, flute (1997–present), bass, drums (1997–2002)
- Brigid Dawson – keyboards, backing vocals, percussion (2005–2013, 2015, 2017, 2023, 2025–present; studio backing vocalist 2015–2019)
- Tim Hellman – bass guitar (2014–present)
- Dan Rincon – drums, sampler (2015–present)
- Paul Quattrone – drums (2017–present)
- Tomas Dolas – keyboards, guitar (2018–present)

Former

- Jeff Rosenburg – drums (2002–2003)
- Patrick Mullins – drums, electronics, singing saw (2004–2006, 2017)
- Petey Dammit – bass, guitar (2006–2013)
- Jigmae Baer – drums (2006–2007)
- Mike Shoun – drums (2007–2013)
- Lars Finberg – drums, percussion, guitar, backing vocals (2011–2012)
- Nick Murray – drums (2014–2015, 2017, 2023)
- Ryan Moutinho – drums (2015–2016)

Former studio contributors

- Chris Woodhouse – various instruments, recording engineer (2008–2016)

== Discography ==
Released as OCS

- 1 (2003)
- 2 (2004)
- Songs About Death & Dying Vol. 3 (2005)
- OCS 4: Get Stoved (2005)
- Memory of a Cut Off Head (2017)

Released as The Ohsees

- The Cool Death of Island Raiders (2006)

Released as The Oh Sees

- Sucks Blood (2007)

Released as Thee Oh Sees

- The Master's Bedroom Is Worth Spending a Night In (2008)
- Help (2009)
- Dog Poison (2009)
- Warm Slime (2010)
- Castlemania (2011)
- Carrion Crawler/The Dream (2011)
- Putrifiers II (2012)
- Floating Coffin (2013)
- Drop (2014)
- Mutilator Defeated at Last (2015)
- A Weird Exits (2016)
- An Odd Entrances (2016)

Released as Oh Sees

- Orc (2017)
- Smote Reverser (2018)
- Face Stabber (2019)

Released as Osees

- Protean Threat (2020)
- Metamorphosed (2020)
- Panther Rotate (2020)
- Weirdo Hairdo (2020)
- A Foul Form (2022)
- Intercepted Message (2023)
- Sorcs 80 (2024)
- Abomination Revealed at Last (2025)
- Off Course (2026)
