= Castle Face Records =

American independent record label

Death God Records
- Founded: 2006
- Founder: John Dwyer; Matt Jones; Brian Lee Hughes
- Genre: Garage rock, psychedelic rock, alternative rock, punk rock, noise rock, art punk, post-punk
- Country of origin: United States
- Location: California
- Official website: castlefacerecords.com

Deathgod Records (formerly Castle Face Records, also stylized as Castleface) is an American independent record label, founded in 2006 by John Dwyer, Matt Jones and Brian Lee Hughes.

The label was initially formed to release Sucks Blood, the sixth studio album by Dwyer's band, Thee Oh Sees.

On January 1, 2025, Castle Face (under new username @deathgodrecords) announced on Instagram: "With the new year comes a new label. Deathgod starts today." The post stated that "Osees/JPD related projects old and new material will be flying under this banner."

== Artists ==
- Apprentice Destroyer
- Burnt Ones
- Coachwhips (reissues)
- Damaged Bug
- Flaccid Mojo
- The Fresh & Onlys
- King Gizzard & the Lizard Wizard
- Male Gaze
- Dan Melchior
- Mr Elevator
- OBN III'S
- ORB
- Population II
- POW!
- Prettiest Eyes
- Kelley Stoltz
- Sunwatchers
- Thee Oh Sees
- The I.L.Y's
- Ty Segall
- Useless Eaters
- White Fence
- Zig-Zags
