= Night Palace =

Studio album by Mount Eerie
- Released: November 1, 2024
- Recorded: 2022–2024
- Length: 80:47
- Labels: P. W. Elverum & Sun
- Producer: Phil Elverum

Mount Eerie chronology
Lost Wisdom pt. 2 (2019)	Night Palace (2024)

Singles from Night Palace
- 1. "I Walk" Released: September 3, 2024; 2. "Broom of Wind" Released: September 3, 2024; 3. "I Saw Another Bird" Released: October 1, 2024; 4. "Non-Metaphorical Decolonization" Released: October 29, 2024

Night Palace is the eleventh studio album by Mount Eerie, the solo project of American musician Phil Elverum. The double album is Elverum’s longest album as Mount Eerie, his first release credited solely to Mount Eerie since 2018’s Now Only and his first release since 2020’s Microphones in 2020. The title of the album is a reference to Joanne Kyger's poem of the same name, which is featured on the cover of Mount Eerie’s 2017 album A Crow Looked at Me.

== Concept ==
Upon announcing the album’s release, Phil Elverum said the album was heavily inspired by Zen meditation, which he said he had been a "dabbler" in for decades, but finally made a regular part of his life in his 30s and 40s. His label explained in the press release that "After natural disasters, things do grow back[...] Elverum became a father in 2014 and then his partner fell ill with a fatal cancer and died a year later. These and other brutal waves of change kept pounding for years and it was all documented in the white knuckle songwriting on the albums A Crow Looked at Me (2017), Now Only (2018) and Lost Wisdom pt. 2 (2019)", adding that "It was in this patient clarity that Night Palace came to be written and recorded from 2022 to 2024."

== Critical reception ==
Professional ratings
Aggregate scores
Source	Rating
AnyDecentMusic?	8.0/10
Metacritic	86/100
Review scores
Source	Rating
AllMusic	4.5/5 stars
Beats per Minute	86%
Exclaim!	8/10
The Line of Best Fit	9/10
Pitchfork	8.3/10
PopMatters	9/10
Rolling Stone	4/5 stars
The Skinny	4/5 stars
Slant Magazine	3/5 stars
Uncut	8/10

According to the review aggregator Metacritic, Night Palace received "universal acclaim" based on a weighted average score of 86 out of 100 from 14 critic scores.

=== Year-end lists ===
Select 2024 year-end rankings for Night Palace
Publication/critic	Accolade	Rank	Ref.
The Atlantic	10 Best Albums of 2024	1	
Beats Per Minute	Top 50 Albums of 2024	17	
The Fader	50 Best Albums of 2024	6	
Pitchfork	50 Best Albums of 2024	7	
The Ringer	30 Best Albums of 2024	19	
Slant Magazine	50 Best Albums of 2024	22	
Stereogum	50 Best Albums of 2024	7	

== Track listing ==
All tracks are written by Phil Elverum.

Night Palace track listing
No.	Title	Length
1.	"Night Palace"	4:21
2.	"Huge Fire"	3:05
3.	"Breaths"	3:32
4.	"Swallowed Alive"	0:53
5.	"My Canopy"	0:59
6.	"Broom of Wind"	1:39
7.	"I Walk"	5:06
8.	"(soft air)"	1:03
9.	"Empty Paper Towel Roll"	1:30
10.	"Wind & Fog"	1:24
11.	"Wind & Fog, pt. 2"	2:46
12.	"Blurred World"	1:39
13.	"I Heard Whales (I Think)"	4:18
14.	"I Saw Another Bird"	2:13
15.	"I Spoke With a Fish"	3:13
16.	"Myths Come True"	3:34
17.	"Non-Metaphorical Decolonization"	4:17
18.	"November Rain"	2:16
19.	"Co-Owner of Trees"	6:10
20.	"Myths Come True, pt. 2"	1:03
21.	"& Sun"	1:56
22.	"Writing Poems"	2:26
23.	"The Gleam, pt. 3"	2:25
24.	"Stone Woman Gives Birth to a Child at Night"	3:23
25.	"Demolition"	12:04
26.	"I Need New Eyes"	3:53
Total length:		80:47

== Personnel ==
- Phil Elverum – performance
- JJ Golden – mastering, lacquer cut
- Agathe Elverum – screaming and speaking on "Swallowed Alive"
- Alex Mahan – humming on "Blurred World"
- Geneviève Castrée – humming on "Blurred World"
- Bob Von Normann – photography
- Sigurður Þorarinsson – photography
- Tom Adamson – photography
- Edvard Munch – painting
- Hans Gude – painting
- Indigo Free – painting
- J. C. Dahl – painting
- Nicasius Bernaerts – painting
- Peter Nicolai Arbo – painting
- Kenyon R. Kaiser – redwood chainsaw carving
