= Le Guess Who? =

Dutch music festival

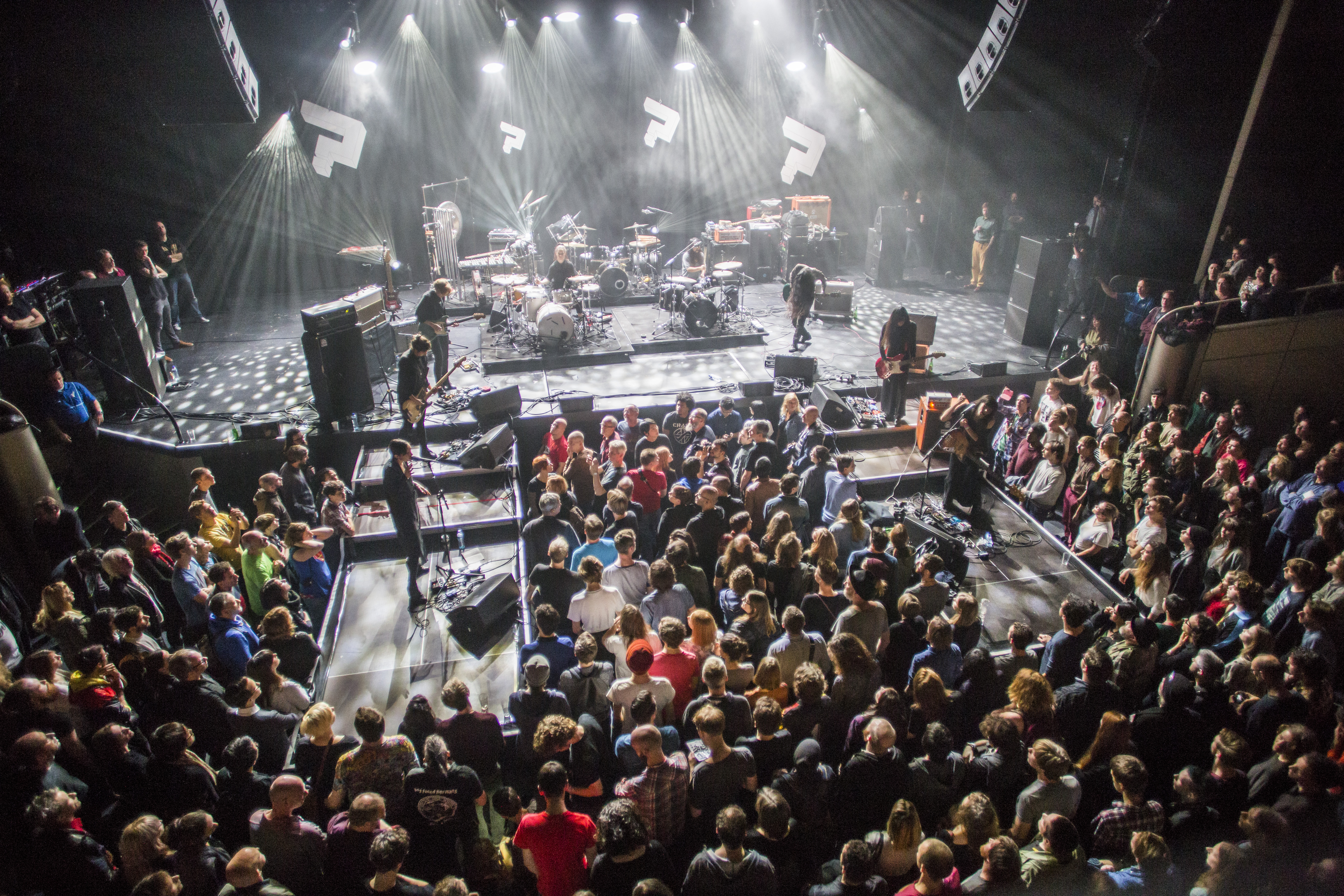
- Genre: Various
- Dates: November
- Locations: Utrecht, Netherlands
- Years active: 2007–present
- Website: www.leguesswho.com

Le Guess Who? is a Dutch music festival featuring different music genres: from avant-garde, jazz, hip hop, electronic, experimental, noise rock, indie rock, world music and others. This festival was founded by Bob van Heur and Johan Gijsen. It has been hosted in the city of Utrecht since 2007.

== History ==
During four days in mid November, Le Guess Who? takes over the city center of Utrecht with over 200 performances in pop venues, theaters, churches, galleries and warehouses. Satellite events with music, film, visual art, photography and markets appear at cafés, hotels, restaurants, wharf cellars, the central square and the hidden corners of the city. Stages are the music venues of Utrecht (TivoliVredenburg, De Helling, EKKO, dB's, etc.), but also theaters, clubs and the main churches of the city (like for example the Dom Church and Jacobikerk). The line-up consists of acts that rarely perform in the Netherlands or acts that have their first show there. The first edition in 2007 only featured Canadian acts but nowadays the festival has many international acts that make an appearance. Le Guess Who? celebrates diversity and inclusivity, focusing on artists that feel the urge to explore and expand the boundaries of certain genres and it features non-western sounds, jazz, folk, ambient, drone, avant-garde, modern composed, as well as contemporary pop and rock culture, and many blended forms of these genres.

Since 2015, one or more guest curators present a part of the festival program. Previous curators include Devendra Banhart, Shabaka Hutchings and Moor Mother (2018); Perfume Genius, James Holden, Grouper, Shabazz Palaces, Jerusalem in My Heart and Han Bennink (2017); Wilco, Savages, Julia Holter and Suuns (2016); Sunn O))) (2015). The last edition of the festival took place November 7–10, 2019 and the curators were Fatoumata Diawara, Iris van Herpen & Salvador Breed, Jenny Hval, The Bug, Patrick Higgins and Moon Duo.

The 14th edition of the festival took place on November 11–14, 2021. It featured Phil Elverum (Mount Eerie), Matana Roberts, John Dwyer (Thee Oh Sees), Midori Takada and Lucrecia Dalt as curators; the initial line-up included SPAZA, Bohren & der Club of Gore, Black Country, New Road, Low, The Necks and Alabaster DePlume.

== Programs ==
=== First editions ===
Initially, the festival focused exclusively on bands from Canada. With the line-up of the third edition (2009) this tradition became less strict and bands from other countries also performed. In 2010, at the fourth edition, the premise of only Canadian avant-garde music was completely abandoned and the programmers began to focus on music from all over the world. In 2007 the festival lasted two days, three in 2008, four in 2009, five in 2010, again three days in 2011 and four days in the following years. The line-ups included:

2007	Black Mountain, Caribou, Hot Hot Heat, Miracle Fortress, MSTRKRFT
2008	Beach House, Clues, Fred Eaglesmith, Melissa Auf der Maur, Shalabi Effect
2009	A Place To Bury Strangers, Alexander Tucker, Bibio, Crystal Fighters, Patrick Watson & The Wooden Arms, Pitto, Staff Benda Bilili, The Dodos, The Tragically Hip, Wavves, Wild Beasts
2010	Beach House, Black Dice, Broken Social Scene, Caribou, Giant Sand, The Greenhornes, Peter Broderick, Swans, The Tallest Man on Earth, Ty Segall
2011	Bill Callahan, Com Truise, Low, Other Lives, Panda Bear, Stephen Malkmus & The Jicks, Suuns, Zomby
2012	Adrian Sherwood, Allah-Las, Amenra, Colin Stetson, Deerhoof, Destroyer, DIIV, Grouper, Jerusalem in My Heart, Mac DeMarco, Nick Waterhouse, Prince Rama, Sharon van Etten, Tim Hecker
2013	Connan Mockasin, Damien Jurado, Destroyer, Esmerine, His Clancyness, Mark Lanegan, Mad Professor, Michael Chapman, Oneohtrix Point Never, Ólafur Arnalds, Scout Niblett, Young Fathers, Yo La Tengo
2014	Amen Dunes, Autechre, Bonnie "Prince" Billy, Cloud Nothings, Einstürzende Neubauten, Father Murphy, Helado Negro, Jenny Hval, King Gizzard & the Lizard Wizard, St. Vincent, Perfume Genius, Xiu Xiu

=== 2015 program ===
Curated by	
Sunn O)))	Annette Peacock, Julia Holter, Keiji Haino, Hildur Guðnadóttir, OM
Between Two Crescents	Dirar Kalash, Sahar Taha, Elie Maalouf
Jacco Gardner	Os Mutantes, Dungen, Nick Garrie, Michael Rault, Eerie Wanda
Levitation	Total Control, Lightning Bolt, Suuns & Jerusalem in My Heart, Bo Ningen, Deradoorian, Ringo Deathstarr.
Constellation Records (Canada)	Ought, Saltland, Last Ex, Avec le Soleil Sortant de sa Bouche
Fluister Nights	Lubomyr Melnyk, Loscil, Christina Vantzou, Otto A. Totland
Le Guess Who?	Deerhunter, Kamasi Washington, Destroyer, The Notwist, Faust, Ariel Pink, Swervedriver, Atlas Sound, A Place To Bury Strangers, Wavves, Kaki King, Protomartyr, Car Seat Headrest, Hop Along, Torii

=== 2016 program ===
Curated by	
Wilco	75 Dollar Bill, Deerhoof, Kyoka, Lee Ranaldo & El Rayo, Let's Eat Grandma, PITA Peter Rehberg, Steve Gunn, William Tyler
Savages	Beak, Bo Ningen, Duke Garwood, Tim Hecker
Julia Holter	Jessica Moss, Laurel Halo, Lucrecia Dalt, Tashi Wada & Yoshi Wada
Suuns	Alessandro Cortini, Brian Case, Jerusalem in My Heart, Jlin, Patrick Higgins
The Ex Festival	Andy Moor, Han Bennink, John Butcher, Ken Vandermark, Melaku Belay,
Le Guess Who?	Black Mountain, Cate Le Bon, Dinosaur Jr., Gilla Band, Jonny Greenwood & The Rajasthan Express, Nadja, Patty Waters, Peter Broderick, Ryley Walker, The Comet is Coming, The Ex, Ufomammut, Weyes Blood, Whitney

=== 2017 program ===
Curated by	
Basilica Soundscape	Greg Fox (Liturgy), Jenny Hval, Liu Fang, Meredith Graves, Protomartyr, Prurient
Grouper	Brötzmann/Leigh, Coby Sey, Ekin Fil, GAS (Wolfgang Voigt), Grouper & Paul Clipson, Keiji Haino, Marcia Bassett & Samara Lubelski duo, Marisa Anderson, Richard Youngs, Roy Montgomery, Tiny Vipers, William Basinski
Han Bennink	Alexander von Schlippenbach & Han Bennink, ICP Orchestra, Mary Oliver & Greetje Bijma, Steve Beresford & Gerard Bouwhuis, Terrie Ex & Spring Heel Jack, Thurston Moore & Han Bennink
James Holden	James Holden & The Animal Spirits, Jerusalem in My Heart, Shabaka & The Ancestors, Maâlem Mahmoud Guinia & Band, Robert Aiki Aubrey Lowe, Mario Batkovic, Hieroglyphic Being, Ex-Easter Island Head, XAM Duo, Sex Swing
Jerusalem in My Heart	Alanis Obomsawin performing 'Bush Lady', Charles-André Coderre presents Granular Shadow, Dedekind Cut, Jerusalem In My Heart & Friends DJ set, Klein, Linda Sharrock, Matana Roberts, Moor Mother
Perfume Genius	Aldous Harding, Cate Le Bon, Julianna Barwick, Mary Margaret O'Hara, Mount Eerie, Mozart's Sister (Cecile Believe), Perfume Genius, Pharmakon, Weyes Blood
Shabazz Palaces	Gonjasufi, Pharoah Sanders, Shabazz Palaces
The Black Power Tarot	Black Power Tarot Exhibition by King Khan & Michael Sterling Eaton, Black Power Tarot reading by King Khan,
12-Hour Drone	Ashtoreth, Ellen Arkbro, Jessica Moss
Le Guess Who?	Ahmed Fakroun feat. Altin Gün, Ben Frost, Dälek, Juana Molina, Julie Byrne, Kevin Morby, Linton Kwesi Johnson, METZ, Moon Duo, Patrick Higgins, Hyperborea & Gesualdo's Tenebrae Responsories for Holy Saturday, Sudan Archives, Sun Kil Moon, Sun Ra Arkestra, The Ecstatic Music of Alice Coltrane, The Soft Moon, Thurston Moore Group, Tune-Yards, Yves Tumor,

=== 2018 program ===
Curated by	
Shabaka Hutchings	Kadri Gopalnath, The Comet Is Coming, Kojey Radical, King Ayisoba, Bo Ningen
Moor Mother	Nicole Mitchell, Emel Mathlouthi, Islam Chipsy & EEK, Maria Chavez
Devendra Banhart	Vashti Bunyan, Rodrigo Amarante, Roger Eno, Gigi Masin, Jessica Pratt, Katey Red
Le Guess Who?	The Breeders, Swamp Dogg, Neneh Cherry, Colin Stetson, Cass McCombs, Anoushka Shankar & Manu Delago with MO Strings, The Heliocentrics, Mudhoney, Yves Tumor, Kelsey Lu, JPEGMAFIA, Tirzah, Lydia Lunch’s Big Sexy Noise, Vera Sola, Cindy Lee, Black Midi

=== 2019 program ===
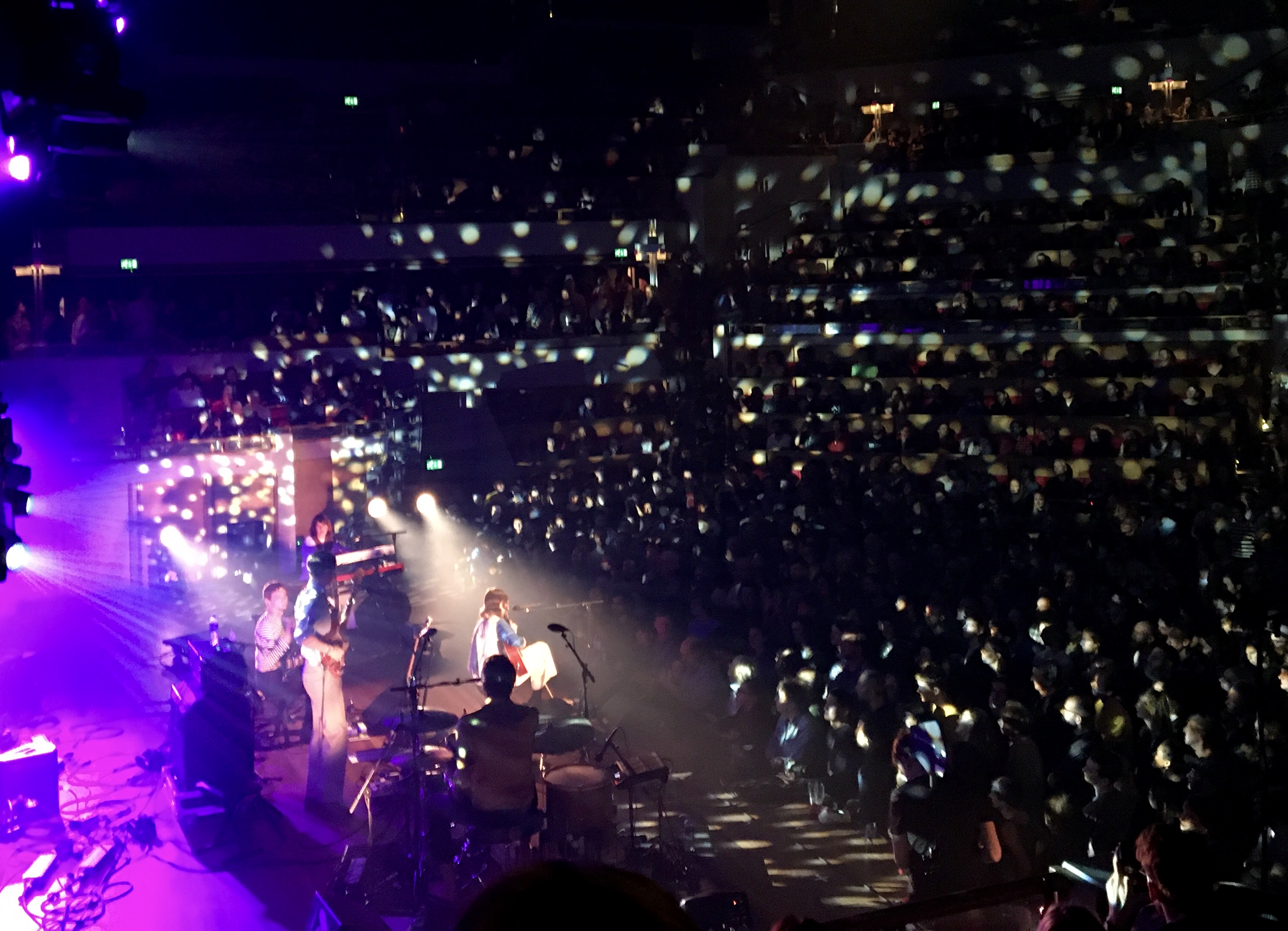
Aldous Harding performing in TivoliVredenburg during LGW?2019

Curated by	
Fatoumata Diawara	Roberto Fonseca, Master Soumy, Ahmed Ag Kaedy, Fatoumata Diawara
Iris van Herpen and Salvador Breed	Mykki Blanco, Efterklang, Amnesia Scanner, Holly Herndon
Jenny Hval	DNA? AND?, Félicia Atkinson, Lolina, Moon Relay, Oorutaichi, Sofia Jernberg, Vivian Wang
Moon Duo	Idris Ackamoor & The Pyramids, Mary Lattimore, Moon Duo, Nivhek, Sonic Boom (Peter Kember)
Patrick Higgins	Conrad Tao, Leila Bordreuil, LEYA, Mariel Roberts, Miranda Cuckson, Stine Janvin, Tyondai Braxton, Vicky Chow
The Bug	Drew McDowall’s Time Machines, Earth, Godflesh, King Midas Sound, Mala, Mark Ernestus's Ndagga Rhythm, ZONAL feat. Moor Mother
Le Guess Who?	Acid Mothers Temple, Aldous Harding, Asha Puthli, Cate Le Bon, Deerhunter, The Raincoats, Visible Cloaks, Yves Jarvis

== Satellite events ==
Le Guess Who? includes several satellite events which take place around the festival in Utrecht, during the main program.

Lombok Festival: a freely accessible festival that celebrates the cultural diversity of the Lombok district, initiated in collaboration with various locations, musicians, key figures and residents of this part of Utrecht. During Lombok Festival, various performances and cultural activities are organized; besides music performances, there are exhibitions, poetry readings, lectures, dance performances and special collaborations.

Le Mini Who?: a spin-off festival of Le Guess Who?. It turns studios, cafes and art spaces of Utrecht into improvised venues for (mainly) Dutch underground acts to play.

Untitled: this satellite event explores the many artistic expressions and perspectives of the artists performing at Le Guess Who?, as well as the exhibitions curated by art and design organizations in Utrecht.

== Other projects ==
In addition to the regular program, Le Guess Who? organizes various free accessible satellite events and education projects. The project Le Feast creates a connection between the city of Utrecht and national and international festival visitors, who are guests for a brunch in several local living rooms. The festival recently started an education program with schools, in and around Utrecht, where students immerse themselves in the background of a festival artist and create a visual work, then exhibited during the festival in TivoliVredenburg. In recent years the festival also became a productions unit that releases music records, live videos and more. Examples are Mount Eerie's live album "After" (recorded during the artist's live show at Le Guess Who?) the audiovisual project of Jerusalem in My Heart with a fifteen-piece ensemble from Beirut, or the collaboration between Circuit des Yeux and the Netherlands Chamber Orchestra.
