= A Crow Looked at Me =

2017 studio album by Mount Eerie

Studio album by Mount Eerie
- Released: March 24, 2017
- Recorded: August 31 – December 6, 2016
- Studio: Home recording
- Genre: Indie folk
- Length: 41:30
- Labels: P. W. Elverum & Sun Ltd.
- Producer: Phil Elverum

Mount Eerie chronology
Sauna (2015)	A Crow Looked at Me (2017)	Now Only (2018)

Singles from A Crow Looked at Me
- 1. "Real Death" Released: January 18, 2017; 2. "Ravens" Released: February 15, 2017

A Crow Looked at Me is the eighth studio album by Mount Eerie, a solo project of the American musician Phil Elverum. Released in 2017, it was composed in the aftermath of his wife Geneviève Castrée's diagnosis with pancreatic cancer in 2015, and her death in July 2016. Elverum wrote and recorded the songs over a six-week period in the room where she died, mostly using her instruments. His sparse lyrics and minimalistic musical accompaniment drew influence from artists including the poet Gary Snyder, author Karl Ove Knausgård and songwriter Julie Doiron.

Characterized by lo-fi production and loose instrumentation, A Crow Looked at Me departs from Elverum's earlier and more complex experimental works, but is musically similar to his album Lost Wisdom (2008). The lyrics are presented in a diary-like form and sung in a raw, intimate style. They describe Castrée's illness and death, Elverum's grief, and his relationship with their infant child. The album was deliberately underpromoted, and he at first considered releasing the songs under a name other than Mount Eerie. The singles "Real Death" (January 2017) and "Ravens" (February), were accompanied by a single low key concert. After its release, he undertook well-received tours of North America and Europe, and in 2018 released the album (after), a live performance of the songs.

The album is highly regarded by both critics and fans, although a number of critics found it difficult to objectively review, given its emotional subject matter and unflinchingly honest lyrics. A Crow Looked at Me is Elverum's best-selling record and is considered among his most important works. It became one of the most praised albums of 2017, appearing on many best-of lists for the year and decade. His following albums, Now Only (2018) and Lost Wisdom pt. 2 (2019), further detail and examine Castrée's illness and death.

== Background ==
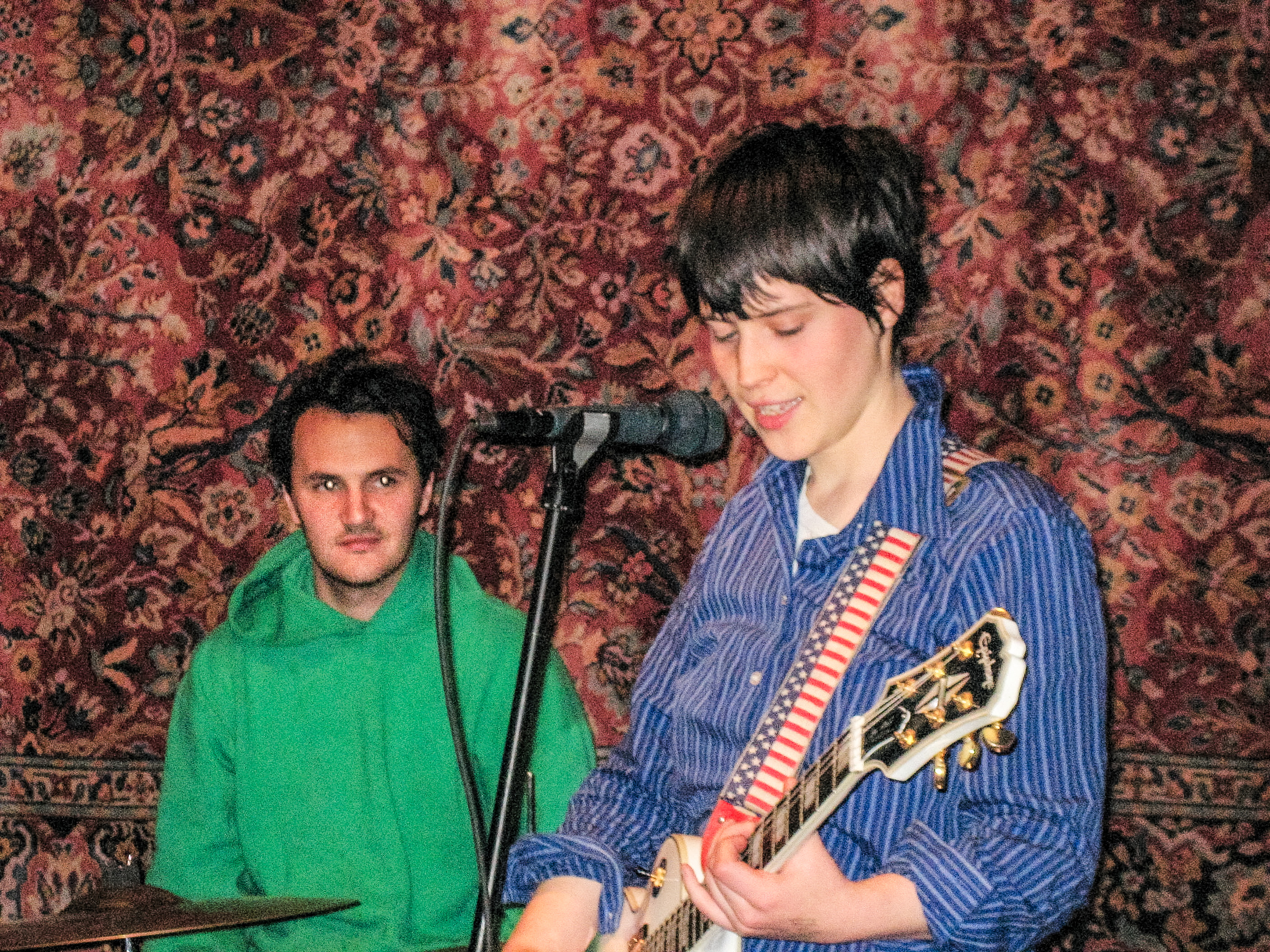
Elverum and Castrée performing in 2006

Phil Elverum's wife, the Canadian cartoonist and musician Geneviève Castrée, was diagnosed with pancreatic cancer in 2015, four months after the birth of their first child. She died at their home in Anacortes, Washington, on July 9, 2016. Elverum considered retiring from music to become a full-time father, but a visit to the Canadian island Haida Gwaii—a place that Elverum and Castrée considered moving to—inspired him to write notes that, along with those he had written during her illness, became the lyrical basis for A Crow Looked at Me.

Inspired by Gary Snyder's poem "Go Now", Elverum realized that he did not have to take meaning from Castrée's death, and could write frank songs that bluntly describe her illness and his experience. Having read the poem months before Castrée's diagnosis, he found it "stayed with [him] subconsciously throughout the 14 months of transformative cancer horror".

Elverum found further inspiration in the works of Canadian singer-songwriter Julie Doiron, American poet Joanne Kyger, American rock band Sun Kil Moon, and Norwegian author Karl Ove Knausgård. Will Oldham's 1996 album Arise Therefore influenced the sparse production style. Elverum chose the title A Crow Looked at Me to represent the "uncomfortable feeling of applying significance to insignificant things".

== Composition and recording ==
Elverum wrote and recorded the album between August 31 and December 6, 2016, at his house in Anacortes, Washington, in the room Castrée had died, for which he credits the album's "immediacy" and "bluntness". He had earlier abandoned the room, opening its window to allow the weather, birds, and nature to take over. He reclaimed the room out of a need for a private space to work when not parenting. In an interview with KUOW, he said that he wanted to create positive associations with the room so that it would not be defined solely by Castrée's final days. He used a single microphone, an acoustic guitar, and some of Castrée's instruments. His decision was out of practicality, rather than from any intentional symbolic significance. The album was recorded onto a laptop computer, making A Crow Looked at Me his first album to be produced entirely in this way—he had before mostly used analog recording.

"Night Palace"
(as rendered on the album cover) (Note: As originally published in October 2003, the poem used slightly different capitalization and punctuation than the version found on the album cover.)

The best thing about the past
is that it's over
When you die
you wake up
from the dream
that's your life

Then you grow up
and get to be post-human
in a past that keeps happening
ahead of you

— Joanne Kyger

Elverum began the recording sessions after his daughter fell asleep or was visiting friends. In notes accompanying the album's release, he wrote that the songs "poured out quickly in the fall" while he was "watching the days grey over and watching the neighbors across the alley tear down and rebuild their house". He described writing lyrics on paper and then practicing until he had memorized each chord sequence—a first for him. He said that most of his initial songwriting notes took the form of a "formless, no-rhythm, no-meter, no-melody blob of words". This process was a result of habit, "just doing what I usually do", which was "to distil all the mass of words in my head into something a little more poetic and musical". Elverum intended the songs to have a "hyper-intimate" and unrestrained quality and to be philosophical but devoid of metaphor, which he felt would be "cowardly and pointless".

Elverum was compelled to make the album having found that works of art he once had treasured were ineffective in helping him cope with her illness and death. Even while writing the album, he remained unsure whether anyone except himself would ever hear it, and he had no goal in mind. He completed and released the record to "[open] up all the way", to make the intensity of his love for Castrée known, and to draw a distinction between art and the "experience of life". Elverum said the style of songwriting he used was the only kind that felt "appropriate" and "real" to him. He found the album's creation therapeutic and felt as though he were "hanging out" with Castrée during its production; by the end of the process, he felt he had partially healed. In an interview a year after the album's creation, he expressed disbelief that he had been able to make an album under the circumstances.

=== Cover artwork ===
The album cover consists of a photograph of Castrée's former art studio. The image captures a number of her personal items, including a blurry but recognizable copy of Hergé's 1960 graphic novel Tintin in Tibet. Stereogum writer Patrick Lyons speculated that the comic's appearance served as a connection to Elverum's following album, Now Only, which has a song titled "Tintin in Tibet". The photograph shows Elverum's hand holding a piece of paper with the poem "Night Palace" by Castrée's close friend Joanne Kyger. The poem had been important to Castrée, who pinned the paper above her desk years before her cancer diagnosis. Elverum chose to use it because he felt it encapsulated the album's themes, his grieving process and the manner in which he wished to perform the songs.

== Music and lyrics ==
"[The songs] suggest what it might be like to look at a person but, instead of seeing their clothes and skin, gazing directly upon their strained muscles, their nerves firing sparks, their blood frantically coursing through their arteries, and understand just how fragile the whole damn thing is."

— Jon Caramanica

The lyrics are written in a style of poetic literalism with a sense of mysticism. Their main themes are Castrée's illness and death as well as Elverum's grief. Ideas of impermanence, emptiness, disorientation, and the absurdity of performing intimate material in public are present as well. Paste's Matt Fink suggested that although Elverum's repertoire of songs about mortality is perhaps second only to those about nature, A Crow Looked at Me "marks the first time he has written about death".

The work's exploration of death has been compared to the Antlers' Hospice (2009), David Bowie's Blackstar (2016) and Sufjan Stevens's Carrie & Lowell (2015), although, as highlighted by writer Isabel Zacharias, A Crow Looked at Me focuses more on the grieving process and its mundane aspects than these albums do. Many of the lyrics reference nature. One reviewer said that "tragedy hasn't stopped [Elverum] from noticing the world; if anything, it seems to have pried his eyes open for good". Unlike in his past works, he forgoes his "general focus on nature's 'raw impermanence'". Throughout, Elverum returns to motifs such as his house—in particular, the room where Castrée died—and the minutiae of his life.

The lyrics are written in diary form and detail actual events and dates. Each song explores a specific period during his grieving process, and according to Elverum, are "anchored to a very specific moment". Thomas Britt of PopMatters highlighted this element, writing that the approach made real the impact of death on continuing, everyday life. With the exception of the final track, "Crow"—which is addressed to the couple's daughter, whose role in the album's story is almost that of a second protagonist—the songs refer to Castrée, although she is never directly named. Elverum said that he does not view the album as a tribute to Castrée, or about her. He believes that he would be unable to create a sufficient tribute for Castrée. At times Elverum uses dark humor. According to The New Yorker's Peter Baker, the lyrics combine "emotional intimacy and tonal frankness to a degree rarely heard in contemporary music". The Guardian's Brigid Delaney wrote that the album is more comparable to "a traditional lament" than popular pieces of music about death such as Nick Cave and the Bad Seeds' Skeleton Tree. The New York Times's Jon Caramanica wrote that "songwriting seems almost too precise a term" because "the line is blurred between singing, speaking and raw emotional data dump".

The music is reminiscent of his 2008 albums Dawn and Lost Wisdom; its songs avoid standard musical structures and have sparse instrumentation—individual instruments enter and leave at unpredictable times—a drum machine producing a hiss-like sound, acoustic guitar, chord changes, an absence of choruses, unorthodox verse structure, and very few melodies. The songs are short—lasting on average less than four minutes—and typically end abruptly, avoiding codas and fade outs. They include unresolved notes and chords; the ending of "Seaweed", for example, hangs on a half-step descent. The simplicity of the songs reflects Elverum's wish to move away from his earlier, more "artistically challenging" work, which is characterized by "harsh tones" and "complicated chords". Jayson Greene of Pitchfork explained the contrast to Elverum's earlier work as similar to "the difference between charting a voyage around the earth and undertaking it". Elverum has described A Crow Looked at Me as "barely music".

=== Tracks 1–7 ===
"Real Death"
The first track showcases the sparse instrumentation featured throughout the album, as well as introducing the theme that "Death is Real", which Elverum once said could be the name of the album.

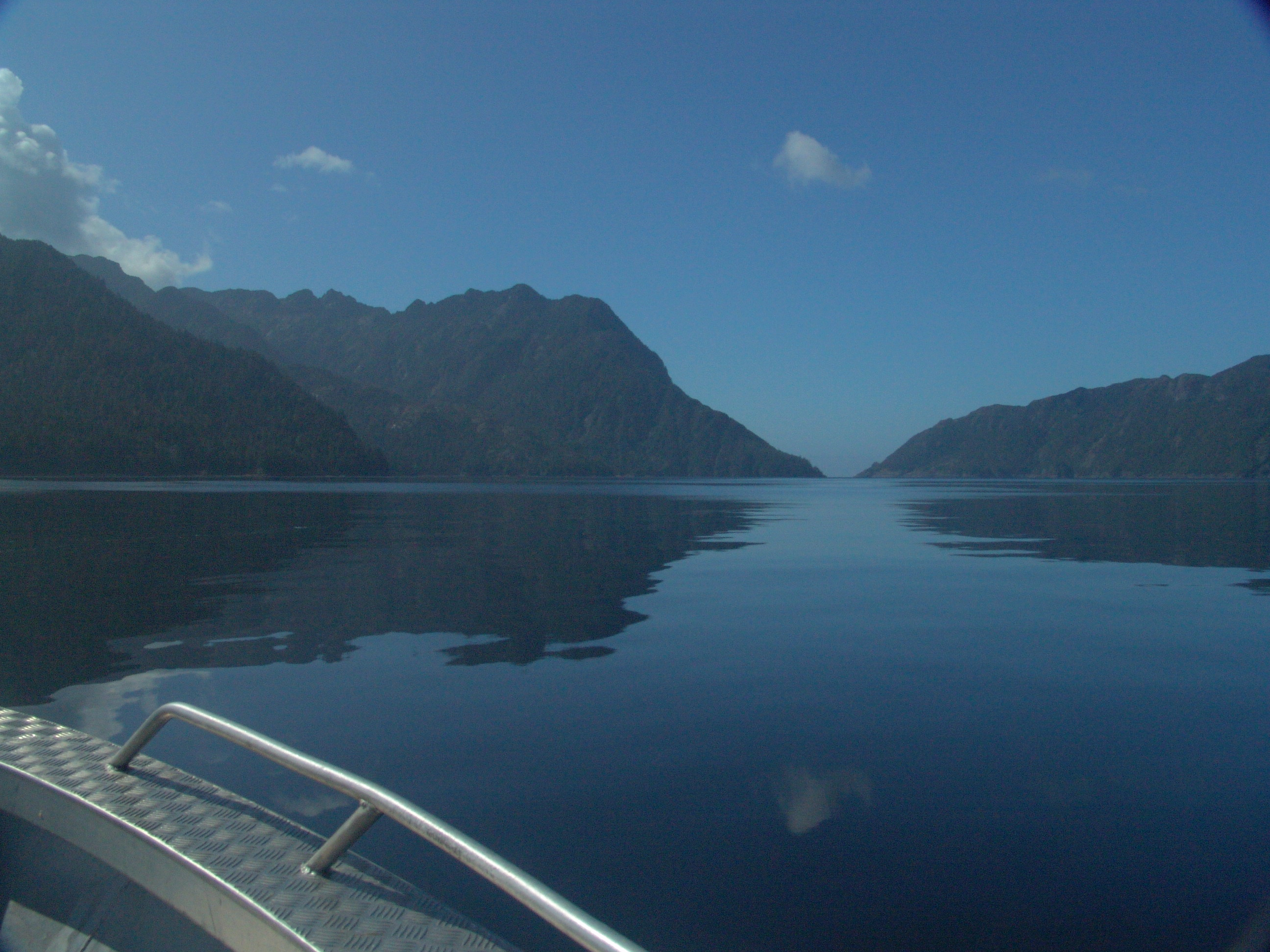
Pictured: Haida Gwaii, which inspired Elverum to begin the album and is where he spread Castrée's ashes. The archipelago is referenced in "Seaweed".

The opening track "Real Death" describes Elverum's shock in the weeks after Castrée's death. He sings accompanied by piano, electric guitar, accordion and drums. The opening words, "Death is Real", reappear throughout the record. The lyrics set out that the album is not intended as an artistic statement about death: "it's not for singing about / It's not for making into art". Elverum has said that although the album is art, the line is about "the difference between the idea of a thing and the actual lived experience of it", and that this line is an example of him "joking around".

In "Seaweed", Elverum describes the scattering of Castrée's ashes, his trip to Haida Gwaii with their daughter a month after Castrée's death, and his fear of forgetting the small details of Castrée's life. He concludes the song by saying that he thinks of Castrée as the sunset. "Ravens", which is accompanied by multi-tracked guitar, piano chords and percussion, describes Castrée's last living days and the moments after. He has expressed regret over repeatedly describing and singing about her final days, instead wishing he could forget them.

"Forest Fire" explores themes of death, decay, and the seeming absurdity of life. In the song, Elverum describes his daily routine. The fire represents a sort of "cleansing", but it is unclear what is being made pure. In the song, he writes that he "rejects nature"; he has said that the line is both an acknowledgement of the natural process of death and a protest against it, rather than outright rejection. "Swims" details his experience of grief counseling and the sudden death of his counselor; his vocals are accompanied by a minimal guitar line and simple piano chords.

"My Chasm" describes Elverum's isolation from his friends and difficulty in talking about his loss in public. In "When I Take Out The Garbage at Night" Elverum reconnects with the universe, accepting that Castrée still exists somewhere within it.

=== Tracks 8–11 ===
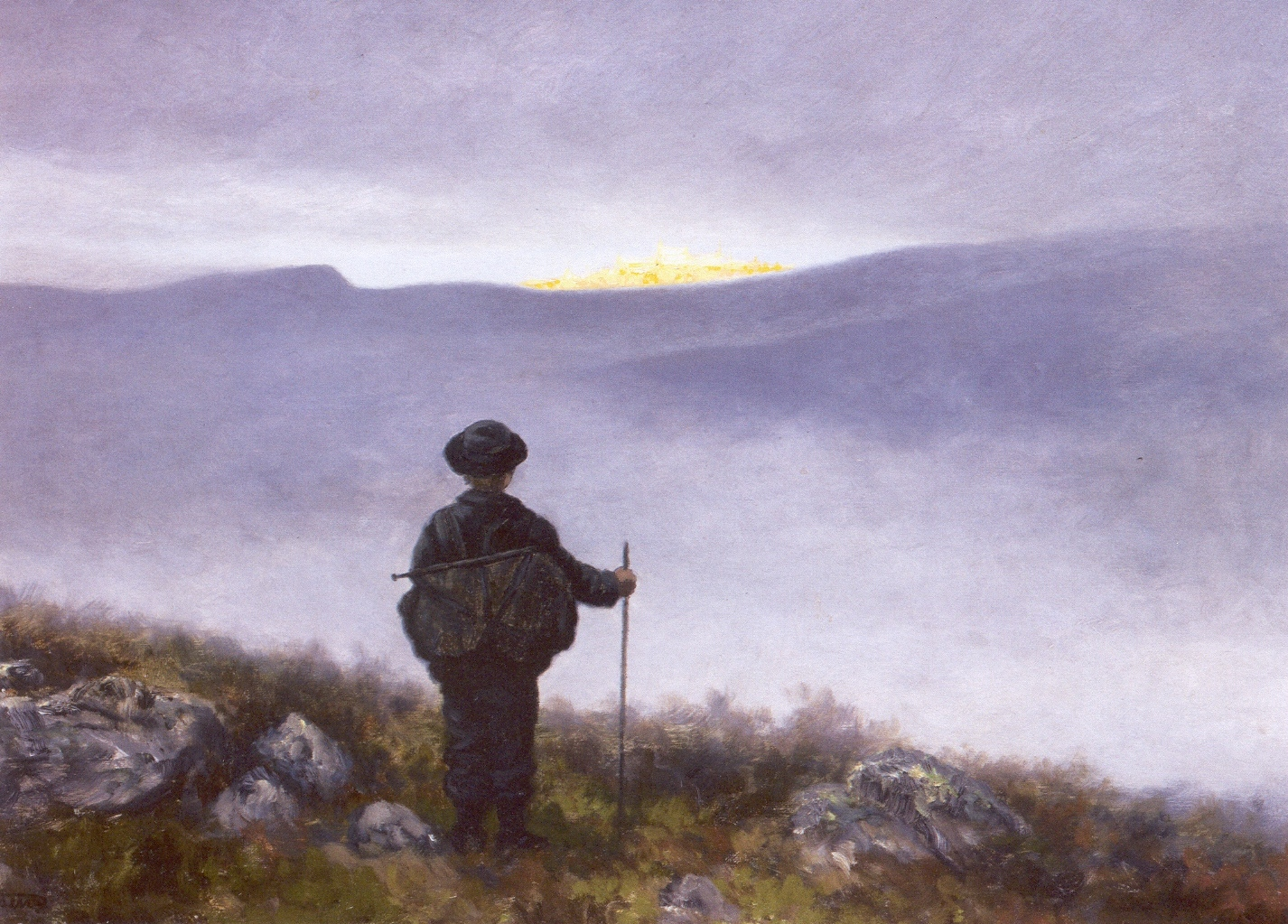
Soria Moria, the painting that is mentioned in the song of the same name

On "Emptiness pt. 2", Elverum sings "conceptual emptiness was cool to talk about back before I knew my way around these hospitals." During the same track, Elverum sings "Your absence is a scream saying nothing", with the word "scream" drawn out, a raw moment that Greene compared to self-harm. Britt wrote that the song's introspection makes previous dark, brooding moods in Elverum's work seem enjoyable by comparison. On "Toothbrush/Trash", Elverum examines the relation between time and grief. During the same track, Elverum uses a drum kit to simulate the sound of a closing door to recall a moment when he took out Castrée's trash.

The lyrics of "Soria Moria" allude to the eponymous painting by Theodor Kittelsen, while the music incorporates elements of black metal. The song describe Elverum and his daughter moving on with their lives. The lyric: "refuge in the dust" is a reference to the Gary Snyder poem "After Bamiyan". It is the only song on the album to have anything resembling a traditional refrain, being compared musically to his 2009 album Wind's Poem. Britt described the song and its use of natural imagery as "one of the most vivid illustrations of Walter Benjamin's concept of 'aura'". (Note: The reference is to Walter Benjamin's 1936 essay The Work of Art in the Age of Mechanical Reproduction. "Aura", as defined by the Tate Institute, is "a quality integral to an artwork that cannot be communicated through mechanical reproduction techniques—such as photography".) A live version of the song was used as the lead single for Elverum's 2018 live album, (after).

The final song, "Crow", is addressed to Elverum's daughter and recounts their hiking trip in the Pacific Northwest when they were followed by a bird that seems to personify Castrée. He mentions events outside their family life and—referring to the 2016 United States presidential election—describes the world as "[s]moldering and fascist". Elverum elected to include this as to not have "the album to come out and be naive to what was happening in our world". The album's thematic throughlines are concluded in the closing lyrics: "And there she was".

== Release and promotion ==
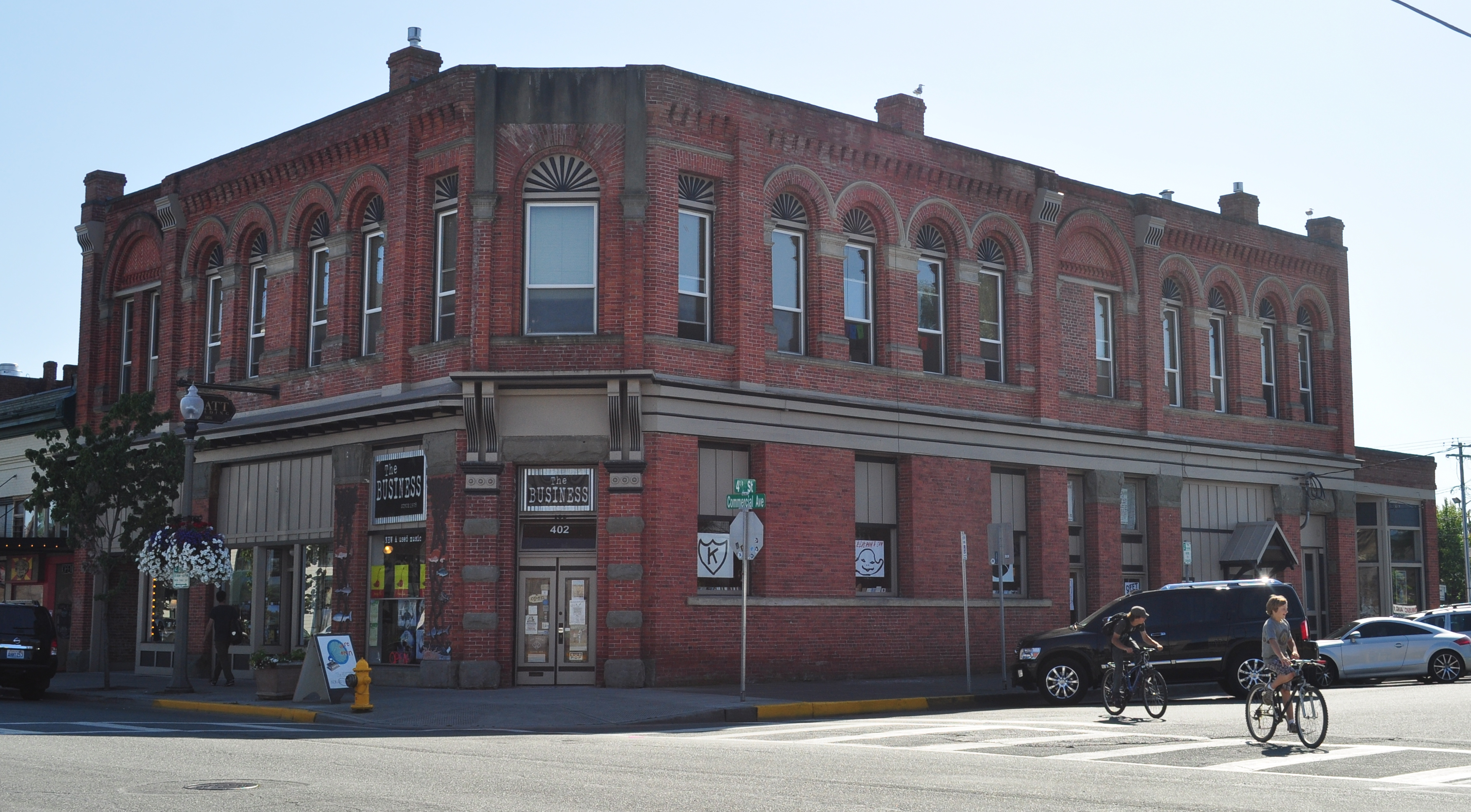
The Business, a record shop at which Elverum performed in support of A Crow Looked at Me

Elverum considered not releasing the album at all. He had originally planned a small-scale release on his website but wanted to reach a wider audience as the album took shape. On January 6, 2017, he announced that he would tour and release the new album. The next day, he played his first concert since September 2014, at the Business, a record store in Anacortes, Washington. He played the album in its entirety during the concert's 45 minutes. The concert publicity generated significant interest; as a result, Elverum asked for attendance of less than 50, the amount the venue was capable of holding. He performed in a corner of the room with his eyes closed and left immediately afterwards. The performance was noticeably sparse; Elverum did not use amplification, and played only his acoustic guitar. Music critic Eric Grandy described the performance as "heavy and awkward and weird" yet "supportive and cathartic and necessary", taking into account the crowd's emotional reaction to the material.

"Crow" was the first track to be released, and appeared on the charity album Is There Another Language? in January 2017. The opening single, "Real Death", was released on SoundCloud on January 25, 2017; the second single, "Ravens", was released on February 15. Its promotional video consists of camcorder recordings of Elverum and Castrée. Both singles were listed by Stereogum as the best song of their respective release weeks and included on Pitchfork's lists of the best songs of the month. He spoke to numerous press outlets while promoting the album but said these experiences were more akin to talk therapy than to a typical public relations campaign. After giving around five phone interviews in a single day, he said he felt "mentally drained".

=== Live performances ===
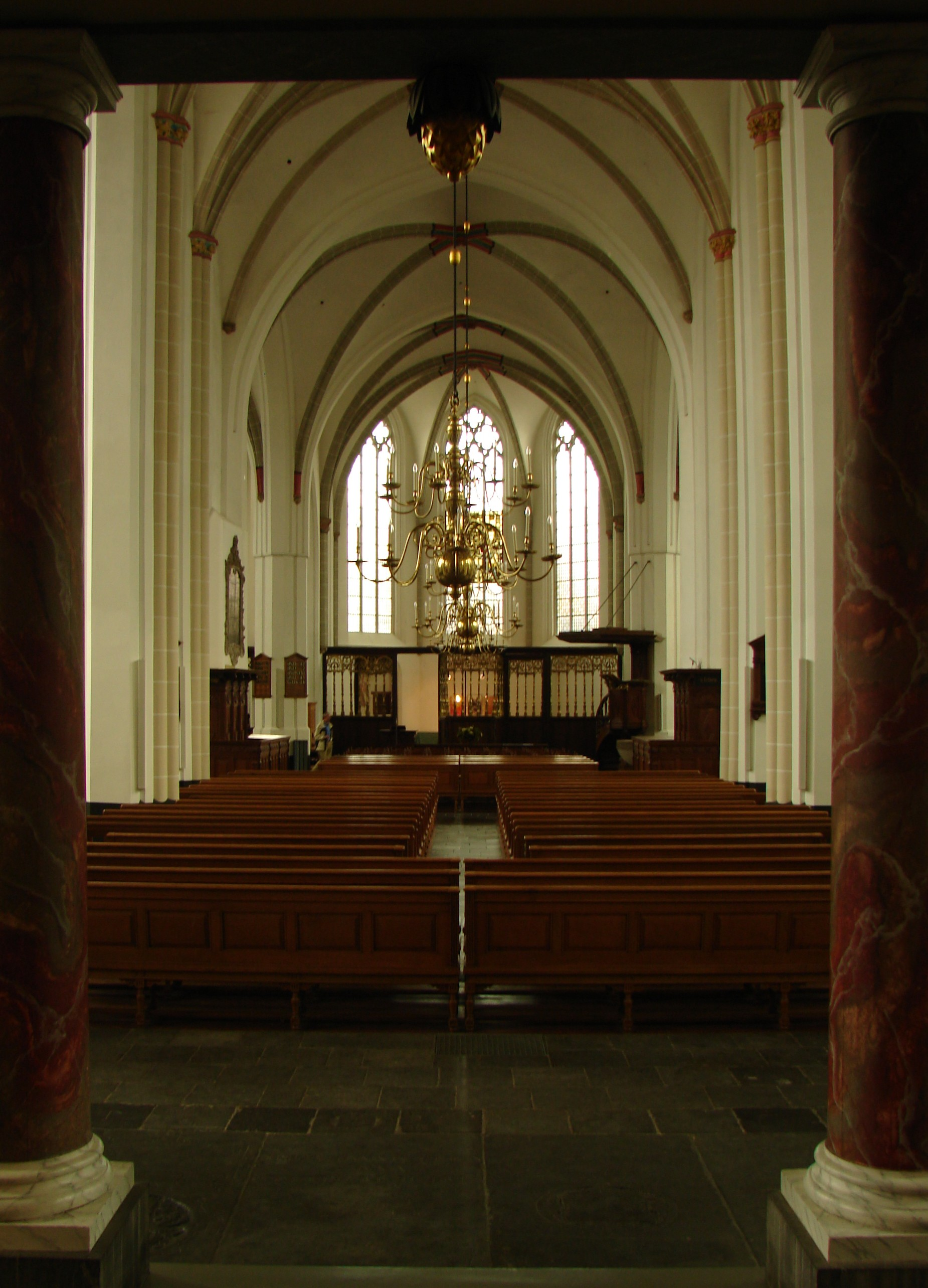
Elverum's 2017 performance at the Jacobikerk church in the Netherlands was recorded and released as the live album (after).

In April 2017, he undertook a brief, solo acoustic tour of North America, followed by another in September 2017. They were held in small venues, such as concert halls, churches and theaters. Elverum omitted some album tracks as he found them too emotional to play live. He played a number of then-unreleased songs, including the title track from his following album, Now Only. That September, Elverum performed "Ravens", "When I Take Out the Garbage at Night" and "Soria Moria" in the New York office of Stereogum. The tour was extended to include Europe in November 2017. While Elverum was performing at the Jacobikerk church as part of Le Guess Who? festival in Utrecht, a sound engineer unofficially recorded the set. Elverum liked the recording so much that he released it in 2018 as the live album (after).

The April and September-to-November tours were well received, with critics commending the intimate settings. Complimentary reviews were published in The Independent, the Evening Standard, Now Toronto, and Exclaim!. Pitchfork's Quinn Moreland described the concert at Christ Church Cathedral as "a wake—a spiritual sensation that was amplified by the venue, a temple". The performance at Chicago's Thalia Hall was recommended by Chicago magazine. Elverum's Le Guess Who? performance was selected as one of the best by Consequence of Sound. NPR selected the concert at Hollywood Forever Cemetery as an "essential" gig from the first half of 2017.

Elverum experienced nightmares in the lead up to touring the songs live until he gained confidence from the early positive reactions of friends and family. He typically sang in a detached, vulnerable manner, and on occasion apologized for becoming visibly emotional. He viewed the events as "re-enacting a trauma and charging people money for it" and criticized the sense of voyeurism the audience partook in, although he said that audiences helped him overcome his fear of performing. He admitted that he would probably approach a similar performance by another artist in terms of being "hard to look away from a car accident".

== Reception ==
Professional ratings
Aggregate scores
Source	Rating
AnyDecentMusic?	8.8/10
Metacritic	93/100
Review scores
Source	Rating
AllMusic	5/5 stars
The A.V. Club	A−
Consequence of Sound	A−
Exclaim!	9/10
Mojo	4/5 stars
Paste	9.2/10
Pitchfork	9.0/10
PopMatters	10/10
Uncut	9/10
Vice (Expert Witness)	A

A Crow Looked at Me received widespread critical acclaim, with Elverum receiving more attention from reviewers than before and earning some of the best reviews of his career. It was one of the most critically acclaimed albums of 2017 and Elverum's best selling to date. Elverum found the album's positive reception reaffirming but "strange and absurd". He felt uneasy about his lyrics being so public, and later said: "I scream, 'Death is real,' and you clap".

Many reviewers were impressed by the album's direct sentiment and emotional lyrics. Critic Zack Fenech complimented the album's ability to make listeners "reflect on their own relationships and mortality", Tom Breihan of Stereogum ended his reviews by praising the impact the album had on him. Tiny Mix Tapes' writer Jessie Rovinelli said that the album "recommitted me to the world as it is, reminded me of the danger of grand statements and the sad comfort in uncertainty". Spencer Kornhaber of The Spinoff saw the album's appeal as being that it allows listeners to express and articulate grief—Tom Faber of The Guardian found it did. Andy O'Connor, in an article for Spin, noted that the album was widely praised and "identified with" because of the perceived ubiquity of grief in the late 2010s.

Critics differed in their appraisal of the album's instrumentation, production and aesthetic. Fenech found that the approach "[translated] and [captured] feelings words simply can't", and Fink applauded the lo-fi approach. Marvin Lin of Tiny Mix Tapes and The Guardian's Michael Hann gave ambivalent opinions; Hann said the style was "functional" and "sufficiently mannered that it's not really a question of whether it's good or not".

Some reviewers echoed Elverum's opinion that its sparse instrumentation barely constituted music. Jon Caramanica observed how the songs' intensity almost defied the label of art. Breihan thought that the album rejected conventional standards of music, a theme commonly found through other reviews. A few critics found it a difficult album to review. Jochan Embley of The Independent said that it was strange to praise an album that earnestly details someone's grieving process, while Lin scored the album but said that his rating meant "absolutely nothing".

=== Accolades ===
A Crow Looked at Me appeared on multiple 2017 year-end lists. It placed first, second and third on those published by Tiny Mix Tapes, The Daily Beast and The New York Times, respectively. It ranked 15th in The Village Voice's Pazz & Jop poll, which collected top-ten ballots of more than 400 critics from across the United States that year. In readers' polls conducted by Pitchfork and Stereogum, the album placed at number seven and number four, respectively. It was featured on several lists of the best albums of the 2010s decade, including a top-20 placement by Noisey. According to a survey of decade-end lists by the Seattle Metropolitan, it was the most-mentioned album by an artist from the Seattle area.

Accolades for A Crow Looked at Me
Year	Publication	List	Rank	Ref.
2017	The Atlantic	Year-end	6	
2017	Consequence of Sound	Year-end	8	
2017	The Daily Beast	Year-end	2	
2017	Metacritic	Year-end	2 (Note: Based on aggregated review scores.)	
2017	Metacritic	Year-end	11 (Note: Based on aggregated rankings on year-end lists.)	
2017	Now	Year-end	2	
2017	The New York Times	Year-end	3	
2017	Paste	Year-end	9	
2017	Pitchfork	Year-end	14	
2017	Pitchfork	Year-end	7 (Note: Readers' poll.)	
2017	Stereogum	Year-end	10	
2017	Stereogum	Year-end	4	
2017	Tiny Mix Tapes	Year-end	1	
2017	Vulture	Year-end	3	
2018	Pazz & Jop (The Village Voice)	Year-end	15	
2019	Consequence of Sound	Decade-end	54	
2019	Noisey	Decade-end	17	
2019	Pitchfork	Decade-end	45	
2019	Spin	Decade-end	65	
2019	Stereogum	Decade-end	35	
2019	Metacritic	Decade-end	7	
—N/a	Metacritic	All-time (1999–present)	16 (Note: Placement based on Metacritic's ranking of newly released studio albums. When including reissues, compilations, and all other releases, the album's rank drops to 107.)	

== Legacy ==
The album was described as "historic" by Paste's Adam Nizum, while Thomas Britt of PopMatters called it "one of the most remarkable folk albums ever produced". Both Ben Hansen of Happy Mag and Britt hold it as the peak of the Mount Eerie project, the latter going further and saying it concluded "Elverum's longtime preoccupations ... with nature and death". According to Max Savage Levenson of Bandcamp Daily, by the end of 2017, the album had been recognized as a "milestone" in Elverum's career; Tiny Mix Tapes writer, Leah B. Levinson echoed a similar sentiment. Frank Falisi of Tiny Mix Tapes cited it as one of the albums of the 2010s that "[redefined] the understanding of popular music". Both The Guardian's John Robinson and Craig Jenkins of Vulture highlighted it as an example of a new personal style of songwriting. The Village Voice said that the "absoluteness of Elverum's literalism" is "one reason A Crow Looked at Me is some kind of classic".

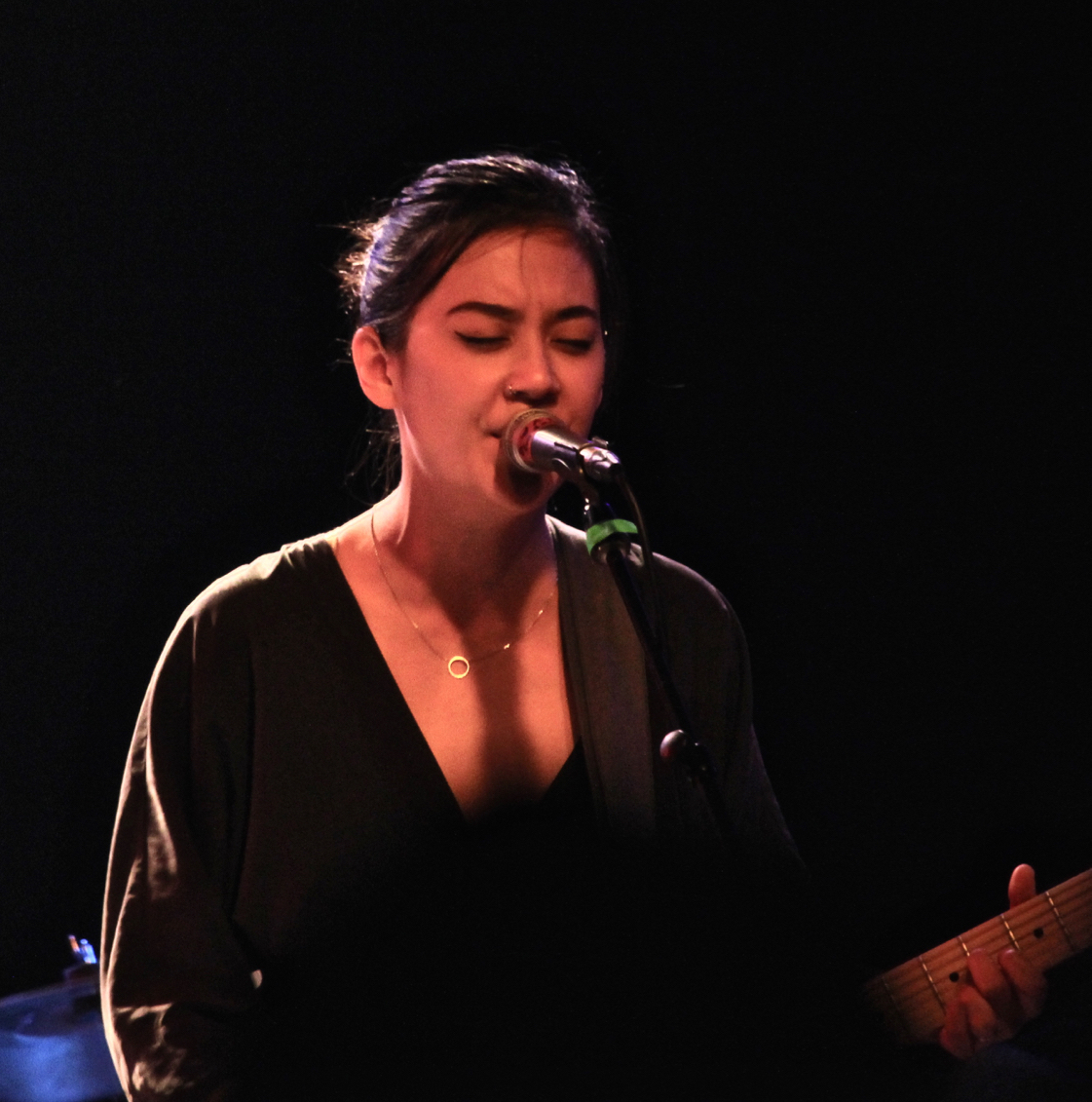
Zauner in 2017

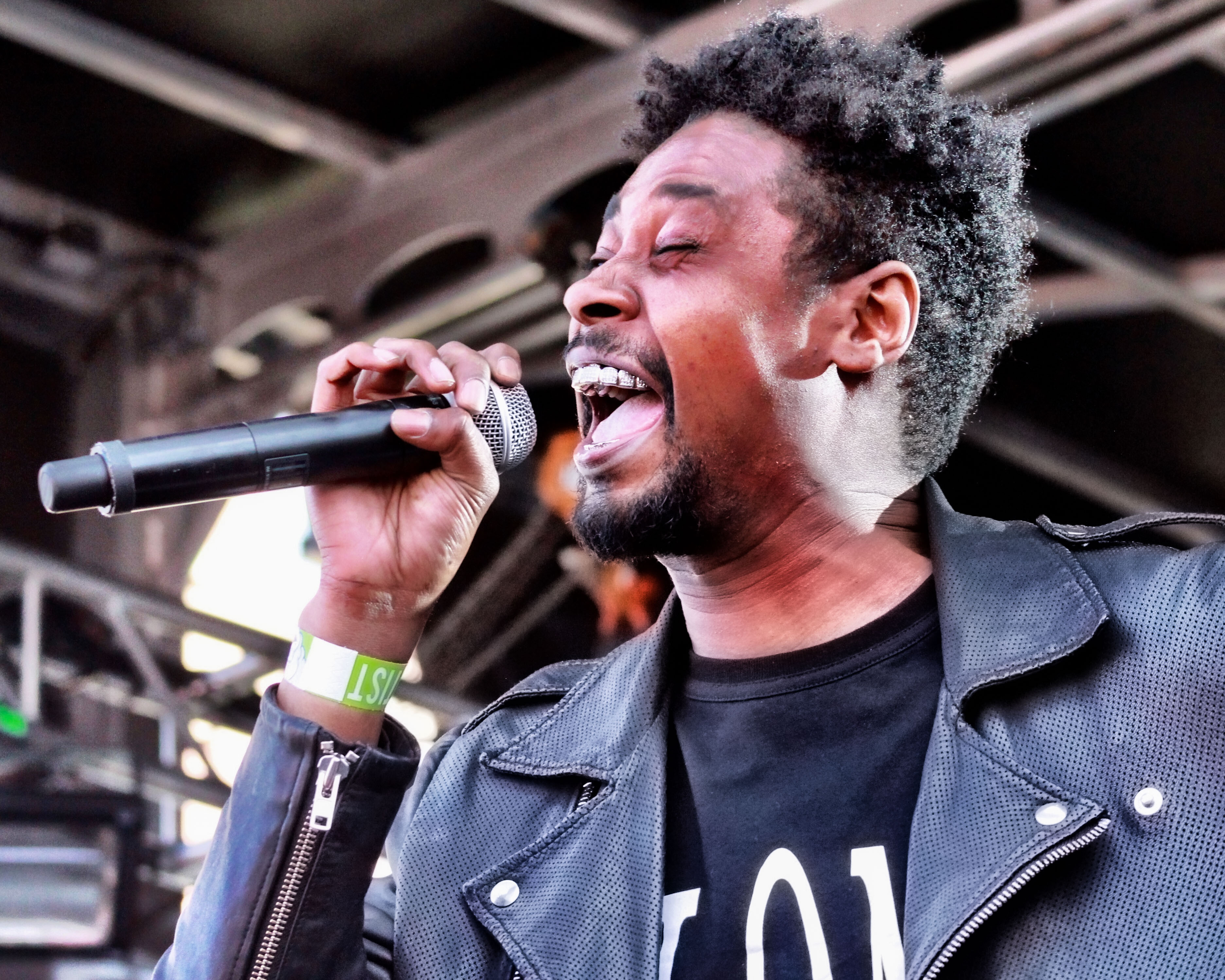
Brown in 2017

Michelle Zauner cited A Crow Looked at Me as an album that changed her life. American rapper Danny Brown chose it as his favorite album of 2017.

In 2017, the American rapper Danny Brown named A Crow Looked at Me as his favorite album of the year; Elverum publicly thanked Brown and later noted that his endorsement had caused a greater increase in sales than the album's appearance on the New York Times year-end list. Michelle Zauner of Japanese Breakfast chose it as one of the five albums that changed her life and said that it helped her cope with the death of her mother. Gilles Demolder of the black metal band Oathbreaker took inspiration from the album, and said that it helped him see that "acoustic guitar and words can be so much heavier than anything I've heard before".

Elverum did not feel he had fully conveyed his grief process by the end of the album's recording. His following studio albums, Now Only (2018) which Elverum described as "part two", and Lost Wisdom Pt. 2 (2019) continue A Crow Looked at Me's themes. The three albums form a trilogy that center on Castrée's death and the birth of their daughter. By the following year, Elverum said that he no longer fully related to the grief expressed on the album. Ultimately, the album led him to the realization "that everyone is much kinder and more mature than [he] expected" and that "opening up about this stuff improved [his] feeling about being alive".

== Track listing ==
All tracks are written and produced by Phil Elverum.

A Crow Looked at Me track listing
No.	Title	Length
1.	"Real Death"	2:27
2.	"Seaweed"	3:01
3.	"Ravens"	6:39
4.	"Forest Fire"	4:15
5.	"Swims"	4:07
6.	"My Chasm"	2:22
7.	"When I Take Out the Garbage at Night"	2:25
8.	"Emptiness pt. 2"	3:28
9.	"Toothbrush/Trash"	3:52
10.	"Soria Moria"	6:33
11.	"Crow"	2:21
Total length:		41:30

== Personnel ==
Credits adapted from the album's liner notes.

- Phil Elverum – songwriting, vocals, production, acoustic and electric guitar, drum machine, bass guitar, piano, accordion
- John Golden – mastering
- Joanne Kyger – poem

== Release history ==
Release formats for A Crow Looked at Me
Region	Release date	Label	Format	Cat. no.	Ref.
United States	March 24, 2017	P. W. Elverum & Sun, Ltd.	Vinyl; digital download	ELV040	
Japan	April 15, 2017	P. W. Elverum & Sun, Ltd.	CD	EPCD101	
