= After (Mount Eerie album) =

Live album by Mount Eerie
- Released: September 21, 2018
- Recorded: November 10, 2017
- Venue: The Jacobikerk in Utrecht, Netherlands
- Genre: Indie folk
- Length: 58:13
- Label: P.W. Elverum & Sun
- Producer: Phil Elverum

Mount Eerie chronology
Now Only (2018)	After (2018)	Lost Wisdom pt. 2 (2019)

After (stylized as (after)) is a live album by Mount Eerie, released in 2018. The album captures a live performance of songs from A Crow Looked at Me and Now Only recorded at the 2017 Le Guess Who? festival in the Netherlands.

== Reception ==
Professional ratings
Aggregate scores
Source	Rating
Metacritic	86/100
Review scores
Source	Rating
AllMusic	4/5 stars
Exclaim!	8/10
Pitchfork	8.1/10
Tiny Mix Tapes	5/5

Upon release, the album received critical acclaim. At Metacritic, which assigns a normalized rating out of 100 to reviews from music critics, the album has received an average score of 86, indicating "universal acclaim", based on 7 reviews.

In a positive review, Heather Phares of AllMusic wrote that the album "continues the evolution of these songs as layered expressions of grief, realization and love" and praised the live element writing that "Taking in each song as a discrete entity allows different moments to break listeners' hearts". Ian Gormely of Exclaim! wrote that the album "finds its uniqueness not in the arrangements, but in the context of the presentation" and that "we have Elverum presenting some of the rawest emotions of his life". Nathan Reese of Pitchfork stated that "the most striking thing about After is that, even after so many performances, these songs sound as raw as they did when Elverum first committed them to paper and tape". Adam Rothbarth of Tiny Mix Tapes wrote that "this album is great. The guitar is heard clearly, and Elverum's voice comes through on top" and that "As a performance, it's impressive: Elverum switches between strumming chords and picking individual lines, and he does it all while effortlessly delivering his challenging lyrics and their imbalanced melodies."

=== Accolades ===
After was ranked number six on PopMatters list of the 20 best folk albums of 2018.

== Track listing ==
All tracks are written by Phil Elverum.

No.	Title	Length
1.	"Real Death"	2:50
2.	"Seaweed"	3:18
3.	"Ravens"	7:02
4.	"When I Take Out the Garbage at Night"	2:21
5.	"Emptiness Pt. 2"	2:40
6.	"Soria Moria"	6:19
7.	"Crow"	2:19
8.	"Distortion"	11:11
9.	"Now Only"	5:57
10.	"Crow Pt. 2"	7:09
11.	"Remarks"	0:36
12.	"Tintin in Tibet"	6:25
Total length:		58:13
