= Vito Ricci =

Canadian-born American composer (born 1947)

- Born: 1947 (age 78–79); Canada
- Occupation: Composer
- Years active: 1979–present
- Labels: Creation; Music from Memory; Intelligent Instruments; Séance Centre
- Website: www.vitoricci.com

Vito Ricci (born 1947) is a Canadian-born American composer.

== Early life ==
Ricci was born in Canada and adopted by Italian-American parents.

== Career ==
Ricci started out as a percussionist, studying with Ornette Coleman and playing with avant-garde jazz musicians like Rashied Ali and Byard Lancaster.

In 1985, Ricci self-released the ambient album Music from Memory, which later became the namesake for the Dutch reissue label of the same name. Selections from the album, along with unreleased material, was reissued in 2015 by the aforementioned label, on the compilation album I Was Crossing a Bridge.

He wrote Partitas (1988) for the Kronos Quartet.

== Works ==
- Guilty (1977, voice, collaboration with Ann Rover)
- 12 Tone Violin (1978, violin)
- Dada Mama (1978, voice, collaboration with Ann Rover)
- French Customs (1979, voice, collaboration with Ann Rover)
- Kickin' (1979, voice, collaboration with Ann Rover)
- Love Crazy (Why Are All the People I) (1979, voice, collaboration with Ann Rover)
- Love Makes You Vicious (1979, voice, collaboration with Ann Rover)
- Made in Japan (1979, voice, collaboration with Ann Rover)
- Rock 'n Roll Mythology (1979, voice, collaboration with Bob Holman)
- Modern Love (1980, voice and piano, collaboration with Ann Rover)
- Placebo (1981, voice, collaboration with Ann Rover)
- Bad News Lullaby (1982, voice, collaboration with Ann Rover)
- Whims (1982–1993, piano)
- All I Want To Do (1983, voice, collaboration with Ann Rover)
- Cellular Phone (1984, voice, collaboration with Bob Holman)
- Cross Court (1984, electronics)
- Ice (1984, electronics)
- The King Believes in a Just War (1984, prepared wrench guitar)
- The Ship Was Sailing (1984, electronics)
- Love Lake (1985, voice, collaboration with Bob Holman)
- Above (1987, voice, collaboration with Ann Rover)
- Cemetery (for T. Sherwood) (1988, string quartet)
- January (1988, voice, collaboration with Bob Holman)
- New Hampshire (1988, flute, clarinet, trumpet, French horn, bass clarinet, string section and piano)
- Partitas (1988, string quartet)
- Stillife (1988, violin)
- Fire Dances (1989, string quartet)
- Montauk (1989, piano and flute)
- Way Blue (1989, voice, collaboration with Ann Rover)
- Meditation for Wrench Guitar (1990, wrench guitar)
- Theme from an Imaginary Movie (1990, electronics)
- Electronic Dances (1992, electronics)
- Montauk (1992, voice, collaboration with Ann Rover)
- Yuko Cycle (1992, voice)
- Eclipse (1992, electronics)
- Three Bagatelles (Bag 11, 44, 55) (1992, piano and violin)
- 6/5 Quartet (1993, string quartet)
- Harmolodic Q (1993, string quartet)
- Appetite - (1994, electronics, for video by Terry Ross)
- Art of the Nimbus Indians (1994, for film by Anita Thatcher)
- Cam Duck (1994, electronics)
- Cryin's Too Easy (1994, voice)
- One Sided Conversation (1994, cello)
- Canta (for Tom Chapin) (1995, alto saxophone)
- Fourteen Views from My Window One Winter (1995, piano)
- Harmolodic Habanera (for Relâche) (1995, flute, clarinet, French horn, bass clarinet, viola, percussion, bass and piano)
- Indifferent Aim (1995, voice, collaboration with Yuko Otomo)
- KPs (Dong, Ra, Deba, Mi and Papa San) (1995, electronics)
- Lost in Maspeth (1995, voice)
- A Portrait (1996, string quartet)
- Nam (1996, electronics)
- Deep Felt Songs (1997, electronics)
- Memory Q (1997, string quartet)
- Postcards (1997, voice, collaboration with Lise Vachon)
- Aurelie (1999, voice, collaboration with Lise Vachon)
- Incomplete Direction (1999, electronics, collaboration with Steve Dalachinsky)
- Rafaele (1999, string quartet)
- Can't Write You Something (2000, voice, collaboration with Maggie Balistreri)
- Gun (2001, voice)
- Harmotecknow (2001, electronics)
- Hebron Holiday (2001, electronics, for film by Jacob Burkhardt)
- Help (An Electronic Chamber Opera) (2001, electronics)
- Cicada Music (2002, electronics)
- Nature Morte #2 (2002, voice, collaboration with Steve Dalachinsky)
- Soleil (2002, voice, collaboration with Yuko Otomo)
- Birds in Flight for Jacob Burkhardt (2003, string quartet)
- Crossing (2003, full orchestra with narration)
- Death Beam Music from "Rebel Café" by Ed Sanders (2003)
- Don't Know Who I Am (2003, string quartet)
- Philosophies (2003, piano and violin)
- I Miss Her (2004)
- Nice Shirt (2004, voice, collaboration with Steve Dalachinsky)
- Fantasia (2005, piano)
- Out of the Blue for Joe Riggio (2005, piano)
- Praise Poem for Bob and Elizabeth (2005, string quartet)
- Rain Drops Music in My Ears (2005)
- Song for my Father (2005)
- Vocalise (2005, voice, collaboration with Lise Vachon)
- 53 Ablon (2006, voice)
- Cote De Neigh for Pierrette (2006, solo guitar)
- Elizabeth's Studio (2006, string quartet)
- Mix for Jonny Mann (2006)
- After the Rain (2007)
- Ah-Ha (2007)
- Double Vision (2007)

== Partial discography ==
- Postones (1983)
- Music from Memory (1985)
- Whims (1996)
- I Was Crossing a Bridge (2015)
- A Symphony for Amiga (2016)
- My Little Life (2017)
