= Lost Wisdom pt. 2 =

Studio album by Mount Eerie and Julie Doiron
- Released: November 8, 2019
- Recorded: May 26 – June 1, 2019
- Genre: Indie folk
- Length: 31:30
- Label: P.W. Elverum & Sun Ltd.
- Producer: Phil Elverum, Nicholas Wilbum

Mount Eerie chronology
(after) (2018)	Lost Wisdom pt. 2 (2019)	Night Palace (2024)

Mount Eerie studio album chronology
Now Only (2018)	Lost Wisdom pt. 2 (2019)	Night Palace (2024)

Julie Doiron chronology
Julie Doiron Canta en Español Vol. III (2018)	Lost Wisdom pt. 2 (2019)	I Thought of You (2021)

Singles from Lost Wisdom pt. 2
- 1. "Love Without Possession" Released: September 25, 2019; 2. "Belief pt. 2" Released: October 22, 2019

Lost Wisdom pt. 2 is the second collaborative studio album by Mount Eerie and Julie Doiron. It was released on November 8, 2019. Like the previous two Mount Eerie albums, it concerns the death of Geneviève Castrée, the first wife of Mount Eerie's principal member Phil Elverum, as well as his recent divorce from Michelle Williams. The album is a sequel to the 2008 collaborative album Lost Wisdom.

== Background and composition ==
In 2015, four months after the birth of their first child, Phil Elverum's wife, Canadian cartoonist and musician Geneviève Castrée, was diagnosed with pancreatic cancer. She died at their home in Anacortes, Washington, on July 9, 2016. In 2018 he married actress Michelle Williams. Around the same time, Elverum moved from his longtime residence in Anacortes to Williams' home in Brooklyn. The couple separated in January 2019, and filed for divorce in April 2019. Following the split, Elverum moved back to Washington state, after having lived in New York for about nine months. By November 2019, it was reported that they were no longer married.

Recording took place between May 26 and June 1, 2019. Due to Elverum recording the album with the door open, natural sounds such as breaths, birds, jackhammering and night air are featured throughout the album. The majority of the album was written in the space of the three weeks before recording. When it came to the writing of the album Phil Elverum was quoted as saying

I hoped to write songs about the smouldering foundation beneath all of this surface chaos, a love that doesn't die, songs beyond mere sorrow. If I again mined the circumstances of my life for these words, I tried to do it with liberation in mind for everyone. I tried to make songs that did not rely at all on who I am or who I am singing about.

The entirety of the lyrics were Elverum's creation as were a majority of the melodies. Doiron wrote all the melodies performed by her. By the time of Doiron's inclusion all the songs were nearing completion. Their collaboration was the result of touring together and years of discussion. Elverum knew that he wanted to make the record with Doiron and enlisted her help before he had created any of the songs and so quickly created first drafts before her arrival.

== Release and promotion ==
Two singles were released ahead of the album. "Love Without Possession" was released on September 25, 2019, with Pitchfork writing that "it is a calm, clear-eyed meditation on love as a word, a mythology, and a natural event with the power to devastate and heal". The second single "Belief pt. 2" was released on October 22, 2019. In a press statement, Phil Elverum was quoted as saying "'Belief pt. 2' is the last song on the album. It comes at the end of a meandering path through uncertainty, devotion, sad reminiscence, hopeful idealism; songs coursing over uneven terrain."

== Reception ==
Professional ratings
Aggregate scores
Source	Rating
AnyDecentMusic?	7.9/10
Metacritic	79/100
Review scores
Source	Rating
AllMusic	4/5 stars
Consequence of Sound	B+
Exclaim!	9/10
The Guardian	3/5 stars
NME	3/5 stars
Paste	8.2/10
Pitchfork	7.4/10
Rolling Stone	3.5/5 stars
Spectrum Culture	4/5
Tiny Mix Tapes	5/5 stars

Lost Wisdom Pt. 2 received generally positive reviews upon release. Metacritic, which assigns a normalized rating out of 100 to reviews from music critics, the album has received an average score of 79 based on 12 critics, indicating "generally favourable reviews". Aggregator AnyDecentMusic? gave Lost Wisdom pt.2 7.9 out of 10, based on their assessment of the critical consensus.

Laura Snapes of The Guardian called the album "A set of disconcertingly painful songs" and that "it may be the rare album that works better on paper". Patrick Clarke of NME stated that "Elverum shares a complicated and conflicted headspace with masterful simplicity, conveying a mood that sways from calmness to anxiety, from warm nostalgia to stinging regret." Heather Phares of Allmusic stated that "its songs have stretched out a bit to encompass more grief and more hope. As Elverum bridges the gap between the in-the-moment confessions of A Crow Looked at Me and Now Only." Matthew Neale of Consequence of Sound found that "In spite of those fleeting moments of discord, Lost Wisdom Pt. 2 is an extraordinarily rewarding listen" with particular praise to the track "Widows" stating that "“Widows” is superb, the only moment on the record when cymbals crash and guitars churn, a reminder that the Mount Eerie project is still capable of producing moments of exhilaration with the most basic building blocks" although did admit that its presence on the album was jarring.

In regards to the best aspect of the album, Eric Hill of Exclaim wrote that it was "how Elverum manages to merge his recent more plainspoken diary-style with the elegiac and alchemical metaphors of his early voice"; he also praised the exploration of the theme of love on the album. Harry Todd of Paste noted how the album "harkens back to his earlier work", he also said that it "feels like a quiet revelation... which finds Elverum reckoning with a reinvigorated loneliness." Grayson Haver Currin of Pitchfork described the album as "a moment of astounding grace for a world always in need of more." Jonathan Bernstein of Rolling Stone wrote that "Elverum is still meditating on grief and grace with poignancy on this hyper-literal album", he also praised the chemistry of Elverum and Doiron writing that "Elverum and Doiron work together with an intimacy that conveys a lifetime of collaboration and creation." Daniel Bromfield of Spectrum Culture called the album "a portrait of a mind in flux" and that "it's a treat to hear Elverum up to his old hijinks again."

The inclusion of Doiron had a generally positive reception. Heather Phares of AllMusic complimented Doiron's inclusion saying that "Doiron helps him convey how layered his loss is." As did Harry Todd of Paste, stating that "Doiron comments like a Greek chorus... just as much as she sounds like a cathartic unconscious. Drifting in and out of spectral harmonizing on each of the album's eight tracks, Doiron's simmering soprano always adds impactful texture while still knowing when to let Elverum sing alone". Grayson Haver Currin of Pitchfork shared similar feelings writing that "Doiron's presence is a welcome balm, warming these cold realizations and offering Elverum a steadying hand for some of the most difficult moments." Matthew Neale of Consequence of Sound on the other hand while liking her vocals in some moments also felt like her inclusion could feel "intrusive" and "frequently sound awkward and uneven."

== Track listing ==
All tracks are written by Phil Elverum.

No.	Title	Length
1.	"Belief"	7:23
2.	"When I Walk Out of the Museum"	2:53
3.	"Enduring the Waves"	2:50
4.	"Love Without Possession"	4:33
5.	"Real Lost Wisdom"	4:08
6.	"Widows"	3:02
7.	"Pink Light"	1:58
8.	"Belief Pt. 2"	4:43
Total length:		31:30

== Personnel ==
- Phil Elverum – songwriting, vocals
- Julie Doiron – vocals

Production

- Rin-san Jeff Miller – photograph
- Nicholas Wilbum – digital mastering
- John Golden – vinyl mastering
- Stoughton Printing – jackets
- Cascade – vinyl pressing
