= Virtual Dreams II =

2024 compilation album by Music from Memory

Virtual Dreams II: Ambient Explorations In The House & Techno Age, Japan 1993–1999

Compilation album by various artists
- Released: October 15, 2024
- Genres: House, techno, IDM, ambient
- Length: 1:25:01
- Label: Music from Memory
- Compilers: Jamie Tiller, Eiji Taniguchi

Virtual Dreams II: Ambient Explorations in the House & Techno Age, Japan 1993–1999 is a compilation album arranged by record shop owner Eiji Taniguchi and Jamie Tiller, co-founder of the record label Music from Memory. A collection of tracks from 90s Japanese ambient music producers, it features Dub Squad, Palomatic, Virgo, Ambient 7, Yukihiro Fukutomi, Riow Arai, and others. The compilation album was released on October 15, 2024, exactly one year after Tiller's death.

== Background ==
Taniguchi and Tiller met when the former traveled to the Netherlands to buy records. At the time, Taniguchi was a "private dealer" who sold records online, while Tiller hadn't yet founded Music from Memory. Together, the two would travel together to buy records and work on several compilation albums. While collaborating, Taniguchi and Tiller would share tracks they liked and curate from there:

... together, we would narrow it down further. He always had a clear vision and also approached everything with a producer’s mindset. When we hit roadblocks with licensing, he would always offer the right advice. He was incredibly persistent and always found ways to make licensing successful.

Meanwhile, through the 90s, deejaying became a more established practice in Japan. According to Taniguchi, "Japan was one of the world's biggest importers and 'listeners' of dance music" at the time. Over time, a tradition of intelligent dance music would begin to take shape, and the genre soon "resonated with Japanese producers as they prepared to build their own scene from the ground up."

Virtual Dreams II serves as the Japanese sequel to Virtual Dreams I, which was more concentrated on the European house and techno scene. After mastering the first volume, Tiller already had an idea for a second volume as a Japanese edition concentrated on "an incredibly fruitful period of Japanese club culture." The compilation album took four years to research and put together.

The compilation album was ultimately the last that Tiller had worked on before dying from a "tragic accident." After his death, Taniguchi found it difficult to finish the compilation album: "With only around 20 minutes per side and so many long tracks, it felt like solving a puzzle with no answer. I had to revise the tracklist many times, adapting to the tracks we could license." With regards to Tiller, the compilation album's liner notes state:

Jamie had been researching, planning and compiling this version of Virtual Dreams even before the first chapter was released, believing that there were many great tracks in Japan that fit the concept of the series. Knowing how much love and energy he put into compiling it gives it an extra special place in our hearts.

== Critical reception ==
Professional ratings
Review scores
Source	Rating
Pitchfork	8.3/10

The compilation album made several curated lists online. RNZ and Pitchfork listed it as one of their favorite re-issues and compilations of 2024; the latter gave it a score of 8.3 out of 10. The Vinyl Factory called it one of their favorite vinyl releases of the week.

Shy Clara Thompson, writing for Pitchfork, wrote that the album "tells the story of how Japanese DJs and dancers found their own way to the dancefloor" and noted the track list's "Many early adopters of Japanese house and techno" who were, at first, "outsiders to dance music." Thompson also reflected on the legacy of Ken Ishii, a Japanese record producer whose early pioneering of Japanese house and techno greatly impacted the careers and sounds of those on the compilation album's track list.

Test Pressing stated that the compilation album, along with many others, "was the perfect music for coming home to after the party or just generally getting lost in full stop. These compilations have done sterling work to continue this feeling and sound." The publication likened its "intelligent techno" to that of releases by Warp Records, as well as Aphex Twin's Selected Ambient Works 85–92.

== Track listing ==
Virtual Dreams II: Ambient Explorations In The House & Techno Age, Japan 1993-1999 track listing
No.	Title	Artist	Length
1.	"Blown Fruit"	Dub Squad	9:17
2.	"Phoenix At Desert"	Akio / Okihide	5:51
3.	"Flutter"	Palomatic	6:33
4.	"Prelude"	Virgo	4:03
5.	"Escape"	Ambient 7	8:11
6.	"The Cycle Of Seasons"	Web	5:54
7.	"5 Blind Boys"	Yukihiro Fukotomi	9:41
8.	"Pause"	Katsuya Hironaka	6:52
9.	"1969"	Riow Arai	6:44
10.	"Snow Bird"	Modern Living	7:22
11.	"Poisson D'Avril (Galaxy Dub)"	Missing Project	7:43
12.	"1969"	Drawing Future Life	6:50
Total length:			1:25:01

Exclusive digital only bonus
No.	Title	Artist	Length
14.	"Eras (666) (feat. Something In The Air)"	Buddhastick Transparent	12:00
