= Clouds (Gaussian Curve album) =

2015 ambient album by Gaussian Curve

Studio album by Gaussian Curve
- Released: January 10, 2015
- Recorded: March 28–30, 2014
- Genre: Ambient
- Label: Music from Memory MFM004
- Producers: Marco Sterk; Gordon Pohl (additional)

Gaussian Curve chronology
Clouds (2015)	The Distance (2017)

Professional ratings
Review scores
Source	Rating
Pitchfork	7.8/10
Resident Advisor	3.7/5

Clouds is the first studio album by Dutch ambient group Gaussian Curve, released in 2015.

== Track listing ==
All tracks are written by Gigi Masin, Jonny Nash and Marco Sterk.

Side A
No.	Title	Length
1.	"Talk to the Church"	2:26
2.	"Impossible Island"	7:28
3.	"Dewdrops"	1:45
4.	"Ride"	5:10

Side B
No.	Title	Length
5.	"Broken Clouds"	5:24
6.	"Unsolved"	2:49
7.	"The Longest Road"	7:18
8.	"Red Light"	6:03
