= Music from Memory =

Dutch independent record label

- Founded: 2013
- Founder: Abel Nagengast; Jamie Tiller; Tako Reyenga
- Country of origin: Netherlands
- Location: Amsterdam
- Official website: www.musicfrommemory.com

Music from Memory is an independent record label based in Amsterdam, founded in 2013 by Abel Nagengast, Jamie Tiller and Tako Reyenga. The label started as a reissue label, but has since then released music by contemporary artists.

The name of the label is a reference to the Vito Ricci album Music from Memory. The label has been noted for reissuing rare and obscure music that had fallen out of print.

== Artists ==
- Caliban
- Courtney Bailey
- Denis Mpunga
- Dip in the Pool
- Dream Dolphin
- Dub Oven
- Garrett (aka Dâm-Funk)
- Gaussian Curve
- Geoffrey Landers
- Gigi Masin
- Günther Beckers
- Heinz Becker
- Isabel Zeumer
- Joan Bibiloni
- Joel Graham
- Karl-Heinz Stegmann
- Kuniyuki Takahashi
- Leon Lowman
- Michal Turtle
- Napoleon Cherry
- Orquesta de las Nubes
- Paul K.
- Richenel
- Roberto Musci
- Suso Sáiz
- The System
- Terekke
- Toshifumi Hinata
- Victor W. Davis
- Vincent (member of Workdub)
- Vito Ricci
- Workdub
- Yu Su
- The Zenmenn

== Notable releases ==
- Talk to the Sea (2014)
- Clouds (2015)
- Virtual Dreams II (2024)
