= Gaussian Curve (band) =

Ambient music group

- Origin: Amsterdam, Netherlands
- Genres: Ambient
- Years active: 2014–2017
- Labels: Music from Memory
- Members: Gigi Masin; Jonny Nash; Marco Sterk

Gaussian Curve is an ambient group formed in Amsterdam in 2014. It consists of Italian musician Gigi Masin, Scottish musician Jonny Nash and Dutch musician Marco Sterk.

== History ==
The members of the group first met in Amsterdam in November 2013, and held a short impromptu jam session in Sterk's studio. Tako Reyenga of Music from Memory encouraged the three musicians to record further. The band recorded the album Clouds in two days in March 2014.

Clouds was followed up by another album, The Distance, released in 2017. The album was recorded during four days in October 2016.

== Discography ==
- Clouds (2015)
- The Distance (2017)
