= Talk to the Sea =

2014 compilation album by Gigi Masin

Compilation album by Gigi Masin
- Released: February 16, 2014
- Recorded: 1985–2010
- Genre: Ambient
- Length: 91:48 (vinyl); 123:00 (CD)
- Label: Music from Memory MFM002
- Producers: Gigi Masin; Alessandro Pizzin
- Compilers: Abel Nagengast; Tako Reyenga; Jamie Tiller

Talk to the Sea is a 2014 compilation album by Italian ambient musician Gigi Masin. It features both released and unreleased material, spanning from 1985 to 2010.

== Background and release ==
"It was truly a labor of love from Music from Memory. Jamie [Tiller] and Tako [Reyenga] asked me about a release of my music and I soon understood they were pretty special. Honestly, I had a lot of music from the last decade and so I told them to choose what they loved the most."

— Gigi Masin on the compiling of Talk to the Sea.

Masin self-released the album Wind on his own The Bear on the Moon label in 1986, to very little acclaim or popularity. After the release of the album The Wind Collector in 1991, Masin stopped making music following disappointment with the music scene. Wind later became a sought-after record by crate diggers.

Jamie Tiller of the reissue label Music from Memory discovered Masin's 1986 album Wind while researching Italian electronic music. Tiller got in contact with Masin and received "some 80 tracks", which spanned from the early 80s until recently. Tiller, along with label co-founders Abel Nagengast and Tako Reyenga, spent "literally months" compiling the album from the archival material.

The release of the compilation resulted in a resurgence of Masin's career, which had been stagnant for most of the '90s and '00s. Following the release, Masin started touring internationally and releasing new music after increased interest in his work.

The compilation was later released on CD with six additional tracks; one from Wind and the rest unreleased.

== Reception ==
Professional ratings
Review scores
Source	Rating
AllMusic	3.5/5 stars

Paul Simpson of AllMusic gave the album 3 1/2 stars. Simpson praised "Masin's serene, sparse, slowly paced compositions", but noted that the 23 tracks on the CD makes for a "somewhat tiring two-hour listen."

== Track listing ==
=== Vinyl ===
Side A
No.	Title	Writer(s)	Length
1.	"Snake Theory" (The Wind Collector with Alessandro Monti, 1991)	Gigi Masin; Alessandro Monti; Alessandro Pizzin	4:58
2.	"The Word Love" (unreleased, 2010)	Masin	8:58
3.	"Still" (unreleased, 2009)	Masin	5:06
4.	"Fata Morgana" (unreleased, 1995)	Masin	4:42

Side B
No.	Title	Writer(s)	Length
5.	"Redanzen" (unreleased, 1998)	Masin	4:25
6.	"Talk to the Sea" (soundtrack for Talk to the Sea, Dragonfly, 1996)	Masin	7:06
7.	"Music for Chameleons" (unreleased, 1985)	Masin	5:50
8.	"Little Faith" (unreleased, 1996)	Masin	5:49

Side C
No.	Title	Writer(s)	Length
1.	"First Time Ruth Saw the Sea" (Les Nouvelles Musiques de Chambre, Vol. 2, 1989)	Masin	3:19
2.	"The Nylon Dollar" (unreleased, 1996)	Masin	9:20
3.	"The Kasparian Circle" (unreleased, 1997)	Masin	7:44
4.	"Nadir" (unreleased, 2009)	Masin	1:51

Side D
No.	Title	Writer(s)	Length
5.	"Stella Maris" (The Wind Collector with Alessandro Monti, 1991)	Masin; Monti	6:41
6.	"Call Me" (Wind, 1986)	Masin	4:24
7.	"The City Lights" (soundtrack for Termination Shock, 2001)	Masin	5:47
8.	"She Wears Shades" (The Wind Collector with Alessandro Monti, 1991)	Masin; Monti; Pizzin	3:18
9.	"Almanac" (Les Mystères Des Voix Vulgaires, 1990)	Masin; Monti; Pizzin	2:30

=== CD ===
Disc one
No.	Title	Length
1.	"Snake Theory"	4:58
2.	"The Word Love"	8:58
3.	"Still"	5:06
4.	"Fata Morgana"	4:42
5.	"Redanzen"	4:25
6.	"Talk to the Sea"	7:06
7.	"Music for Chameleons"	5:50
8.	"Little Faith"	5:49
9.	"First Time Ruth Saw the Sea"	3:19
10.	"The Nylon Dollar"	9:20
11.	"The Kasparian Circle"	7:44
12.	"Nadir"	1:51

Disc two
No.	Title	Length
1.	"Stella Maris"	6:41
2.	"Call Me"	4:24
3.	"The City Lights"	5:47
4.	"She Wears Shades"	3:18
5.	"Almanac"	2:30
6.	"Moor" (bonus track, unreleased, unknown date)	3:48
7.	"Not The Kind That's Blues" (bonus track, unreleased, unknown date)	4:25
8.	"Ship Beetel" (bonus track, unreleased, unknown date)	6:01
9.	"Random Security" (bonus track, The Wind Collector with Alessandro Monti, 1991)	5:27
10.	"Zarata" (bonus track, unreleased, unknown date)	3:56
11.	"Swallows' Tempest" (bonus track, Wind, 1986)	6:58

== Personnel ==
Per liner notes.

Musicians

- Gigi Masin — vocals on "Snake Theory" and "Call Me"; piano on "Snake Theory", "The Word Love", "Fata Morgana", "Nadir", "Stella Maris", "Call Me" and "She Wear Shades"; electric piano on "The Kasparian Circle"; synthesizer on "Snake Theory", "The Word Love", "Still", "Fata Morgana", "Redanzen", "Talk to the Sea", "Music for Chameleons", "Little Faith", "The Nylon Dollar", "The Kasparian Circle", "Stella Maris", "Call Me", "The City Lights" and "Almanac"; guitar on "Still", "Music for Chameleons" and "First Time Ruth Saw the Sea"; bowed guitar on "Call Me"; vibraphone on "Redanzen", "The Nylon Dollar" and "The City Lights"; drums on "Fata Morgana", "Little Faith" and "The Nylon Dollar"; tubular bells on "Talk to the Sea"; trumpet on "Little Faith" and "The Kasparian Circle"; zither on "She Wears Shades"; radio voices on "The Word Love"
- Alessandro Monti — vocals on "Call Me" and "Almanac"; bass on "Snake Theory", "Stella Maris" and "Call Me"; piano on "She Wears Shades"
- Alessandro Pizzin — keyboards on "Snake Theory", "Stella Maris", "She Wears Shades" and "Almanac"
- Massimo Berrizzi — trumpet on "Still"

Production

- Gigi Masin — recording engineer and producer on "The Word Love", "Still", "Fata Morgana", "Redanzen", "Talk to the Sea", "Music for Chameleons", "Little Faith", "The Nylon Dollar", "The Kasparian Circle", "Nadir", "The City Lights"; producer on "Call Me"
- Alessandro Pizzin — recording engineer, producer on "Snake Theory", "First Time Ruth Saw the Sea", "Stella Maris", "She Wears Shades", "Almanac"
- Ermanno Velludo — recording engineer on "Call Me"
- Abel Nagengast — compiler
- Tako Reyenga — compiler
- Jamie Tiller — compiler, sleeve photography
- Brandenburg Mastering — mastering engineer
- Commission — design
