= Dream Dolphin =

Japanese new-age solo music project

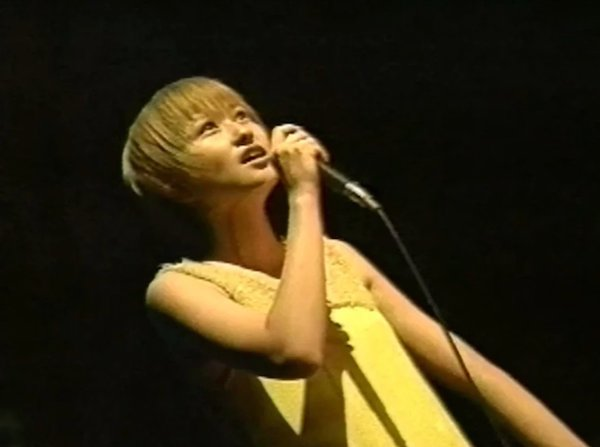
- Noriko Kodera in 1997

Background information
- Also known as: DD, Noriko, Non, Non-U, Angel-N
- Born: June 27, 1979 (age 47); Tokyo, Japan
- Genres: Ambient; new-age; downtempo; techno; acid; trance; breakbeat; drum n' bass
- Years active: 1995–2003, 2024-present
- Labels: FOA Records (U-Can); Music from Memory; Egret; 7th Heaven
- Spouse: Tomoya Kodera
- Members: Noriko
- Past members: Fire T-1; Water M.S.
- Website: www.u-canent.jp/dd

Dream Dolphin (stylized in all caps) is an ambient music and acid trance music project fronted by Japanese model and musician Noriko Kodera (小寺法子), who is also known as Noriko Okamoto (岡本法子).

Dream Dolphin was a three-person unit (Fire, Water, and NORIKO) that was active from 1995 to 2003. They had a prolific career, releasing over 20 albums during that time. Noriko worked with Japanese ambient musician Yoshiaki Ochi during his live performances.

Renewed attention came with the release of the 2021 compilation Heisei no Oto on Dutch label Music from Memory. Music from Memory later released a compilation of Dream Dolphin's music on Gaia: Selected Ambient & Downtempo Works in 2023. Noriko currently lives in New Zealand.

In August 2024, Noriko performed live in Tokyo, Japan, where her latest single "The Roads" was performed for the first time. She then released the official single CD of "The Roads" during her Shanghai tour on October 31, 2024, and her Tokyo tour on March 1, 2025.

== Discography ==
Studio albums

- Love Eating Alien (1996)
- Cosmic Blue (1996)
- Atmospheric Healing (1996)
- 2001 / D.D. Since 1969 (1997)
- Photosynthesis 光合成 (1997) (with Yukinori Fukushima)
- Visions / Rebirth / Underwater 地球最後のはかなくて美しい夢 (1997)
- The Seventh Dream (1997)
- Angelic Conversation II 月の癒し、海の魔法 (1998)
- A Great Mother and a Shadow (1998)
- The Sun Always Shines… (1998)
- The Days with the Earth 遠い海の記憶 (1998)
- Aeon～孤独の虹、もう一つの月～ (1999)
- Angel13: From the Hyper Speed Forest 聖なる森へ～天河の詩～ (1999)
- Ultra: Space Age Psychedelic Trance Music (2000)
- Forest Songs (2000)
- Earth Music Cafe～A Place of Ambient Healing (2002) (with Yoshiaki Ochi)
- Modern Blue Ambient (2003)

Compilation albums

- Crystal Moon (1997)
- 12DolphinsLeavethePlanet (1999)
- Cloudy Sky, Rain and the Rainbow 空に虹かけて (1999)
- Frontiers 風と宇宙の夢 (2000)
- Healing Tracks～Dolphin Thinking Music～ (2001)
- Gaia: Selected Ambient & Downtempo Works (1996-2003) (2023)

Singles & EPs

- Dolphins Talk to You (1995)
- Dolphins Talk to You (1996)
- Folk-Roots of Tokyo 東京の民族音楽 (1996)
- One Love, One Truth (1996)
- Donald Mania (1996)
- Sun (1996)
- Happy★Doo★LuLu★Dee! (1996)
- Dive to the Future (1998)
- The Roads (2024)
