= Michael Sterling Eaton =

American multimedia artist

- Born: December 1, 1978 (age 47); San Diego, California, United States

Michael Sterling Eaton is known for his work as a photographer. He also engages in creative direction and music production. He was born in and raised in Del Mar, California and graduated from Torrey Pines High School.

His client list includes, American Idol, Arnette, Billabong, Fox Sports, The Grammy Brand, Burton, Kings of Leon, Edward Sharpe and the Magnetic Zeros, Citizen Cope, Mos Def, Stalley, Bilal, The Cool Kids, Scoop DeVille, Damon Dash, Curren$y, Gil Scott-Heron, Vitali Klitschko, Wladimir Klitschko, Hayden Panettiere, The Lafayette Hotel, 11 Mirrors Design Hotel, Osiris,

== Career ==
Eaton was part of a group of artists selected to design clothing for The Grammy Brand for their 50th Anniversary. for The Grammy's 50th anniversary. The Grammy Brand was worn by Alicia Keys, The Roots, Gnarls Barkley, Earth Wind and Fire, The Pussycat Dolls and Linkin Park. In 2009, Eaton directed music videos for Gil Scott-Heron ("Me and The Devil"), Mos Def ("White Drapes"), Talib Kweli, and Curren$y ("Under The Scope").

In 2010, Eaton began working for Wladimir Klitschko, filming and photographing training camps and fights for the heavyweight champion. He also photographed his brother Vitali Klitschko for the last two fights of his boxing career. Vitali retired from boxing and became a political leader in Ukraine.

Later that year, the 11 Mirrors Design Hotel which was owned by the Klitchko brothers, contracted Eaton to consultant for the 2012 launch of the hotel. 11 Mirrors won "Best Small Hotel" at The International Hotel Awards. It was awarded the "Best New Hotel" of 2012 by HVS in the luxury category

The Lafayette Hotel of San Diego, CA contracted Eaton to assist with creative direction of the hotel.
