= Now Only =

2018 studio album by Mount Eerie

Studio album by Mount Eerie
- Released: March 16, 2018
- Recorded: March 14 – October 9, 2017
- Genres: Indie folk; indie rock; noise rock; lo-fi
- Length: 43:33
- Labels: P.W. Elverum & Sun Ltd.
- Producer: Phil Elverum

Mount Eerie chronology
A Crow Looked at Me (2017)	Now Only (2018)	(after) (2018)

Mount Eerie studio album chronology
A Crow Looked at Me (2017)	Now Only (2018)	Lost Wisdom pt. 2 (2019)

Now Only is the ninth studio album by Mount Eerie, the solo project of American musician Phil Elverum. It was released on March 16, 2018, on Elverum's record label P.W. Elverum & Sun. Like the preceding Mount Eerie album A Crow Looked at Me, Now Only is a concept album in the aftermath of the death of Elverum's wife, the cartoonist and musician Geneviève Castrée; Elverum described it as the second part of that album. The album was entirely written and produced by Elverum, and recorded in the room in which Castrée died.

The album departs from A Crow Looked at Me's raw and intimate style of writing, intending, instead, to answer grander and more introspective questions about Elverum's life after Castrée's death. Lyrically, the album focuses on themes of the aftermath of death and the lingering ghostly presence of the deceased. It continues the use of direct lyricism and nearly spoken delivery, first seen in A Crow Looked at Me. Now Only is musically similar to A Crow Looked at Me, although its songs are longer and feature some more diverse instrumentation.

To promote the album, he released the singles "Distortion" on January 17, 2018, and "Tintin in Tibet" on February 20, 2018, and undertook tours of North America and Europe. Now Only was an immediate and widespread critical success; critics discussed the perceived sense of sadness and hope found in the album. It appeared on multiple year-end lists. Elverum's subsequent album Lost Wisdom Pt. 2 (2019) served as a continuation; furthering the themes of Castrée's illness and death.

== Background and composition ==
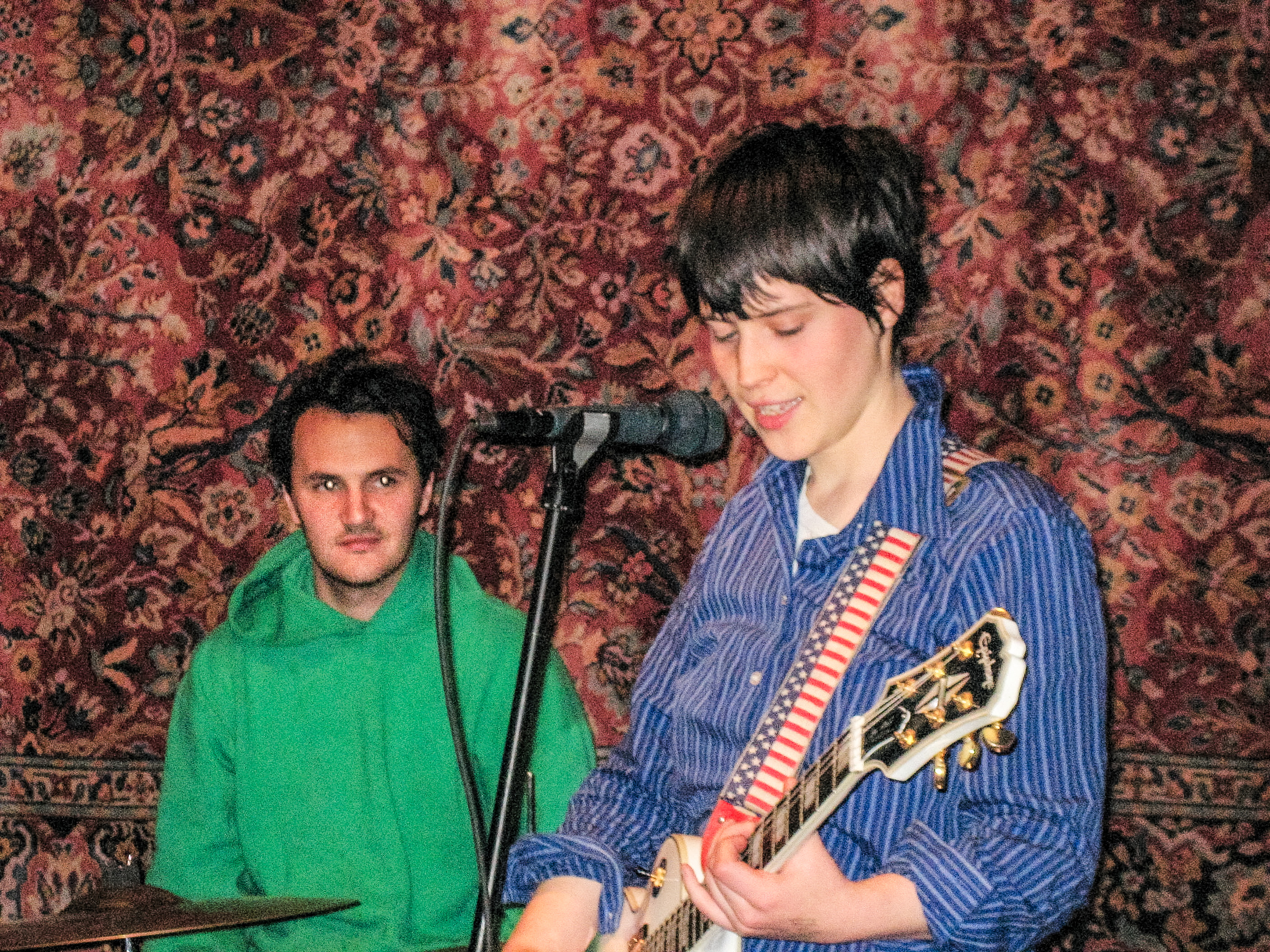
Elverum and Castrée performing together in 2006

In 2015, four months after the birth of their first child, Phil Elverum's wife, Canadian cartoonist and musician Geneviève Castrée, was diagnosed with pancreatic cancer. She died at their home in Anacortes, Washington, on July 9, 2016. According to Elverum, Now Only is "part two" to A Crow Looked at Me. After releasing A Crow Looked at Me in 2017, Elverum decided that he did not want to play any of his older songs because they seemed "irrelevant" and so continued to write in order to have enough material to go on tour. Elverum wrote the album on pieces of paper left over from Castrée, noting their sentimental quality. The writing process took place almost immediately after A Crow Looked at Me. The album was recorded in Elverum's house in the room in which Castrée died.

Moving on from the raw catharsis of the previous album, Elverum approached the writing of Now Only from an introspective perspective, attempting to answer the question of how Castrée exists in his life post-death. Elverum described this as the "thesis of the record, the question I'm poking at"

The album cover is a picture of Elverum's refrigerator. It features a Walt Whitman quote: "Let your soul stand cool and composed before a million universes", (Note: The version that appears on the album cover is an edited version in which soul is replaced with "mindstream".) photos of wildlife, Beat Happening and Castrée, postcards, portraits and friends' writing. Elverum chose to use his refrigerator as the album cover upon realizing how the images displayed on it had subconsciously influenced the lyrics.

== Music and lyrics ==
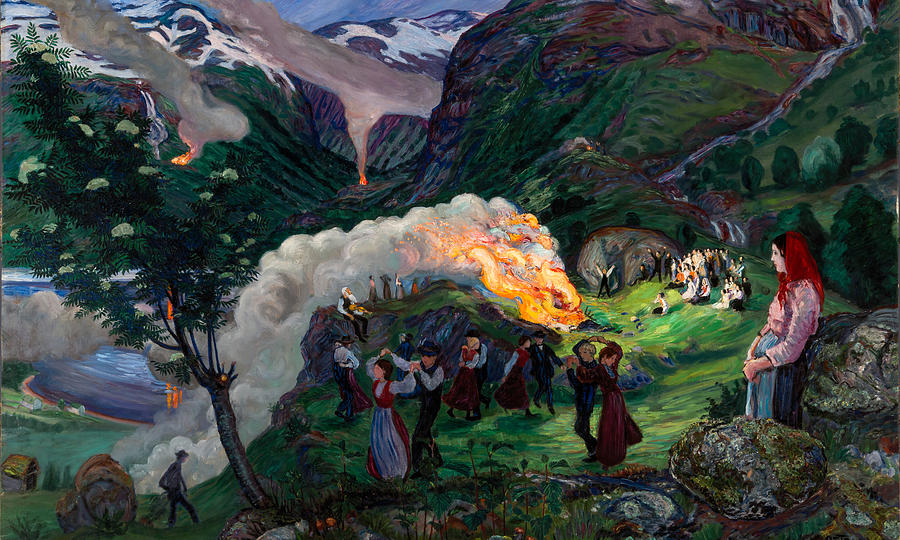
Midsummer Eve Bonfire (ca. 1915)

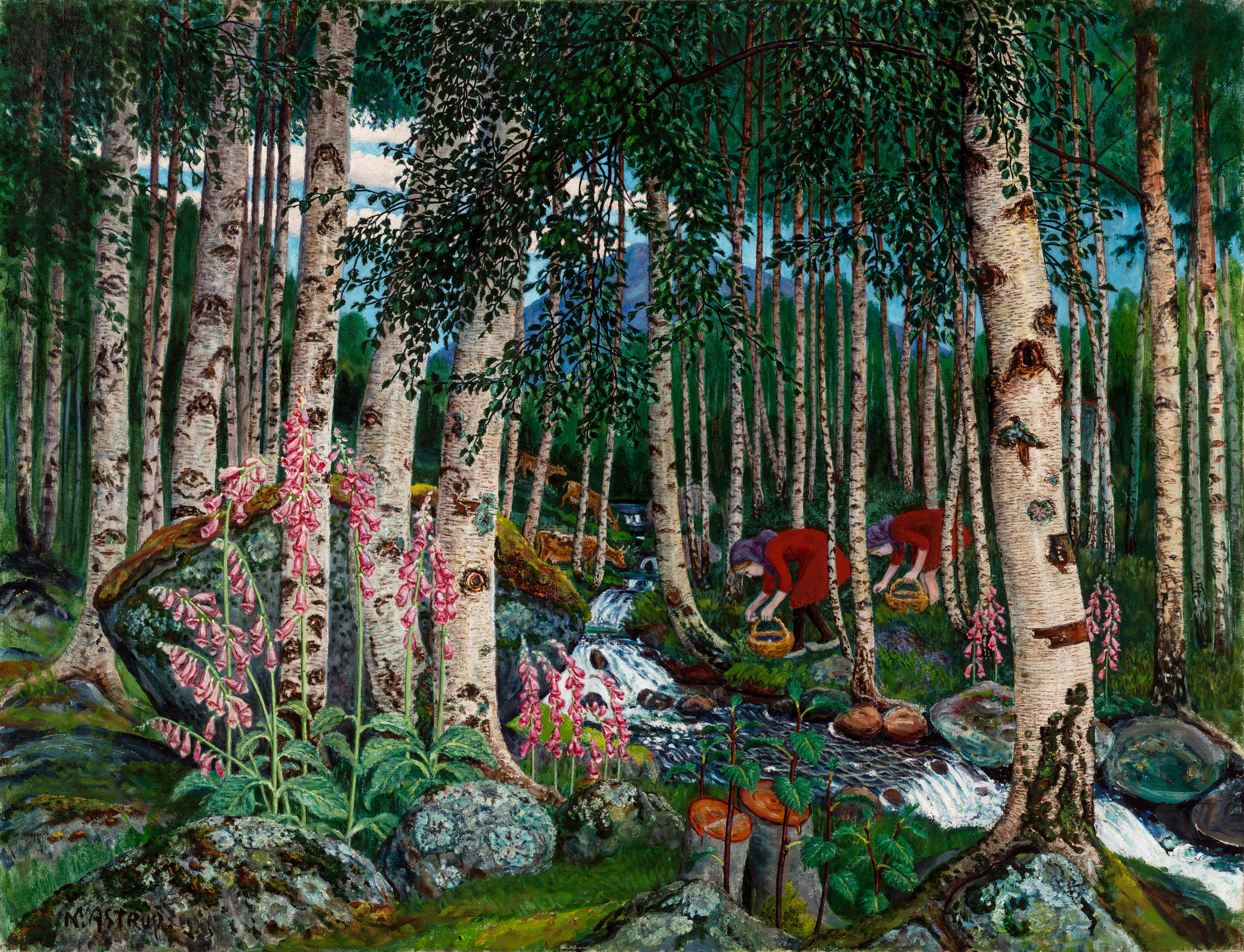
Foxgloves (ca. 1920)

=== Overview ===
The lyrics deal with a number of topics such as the life Elverum and Castrée lived, "the absurdity of the bigger picture" of Elverum's life and Elverum playing the songs in public. Like in A Crow Looked at Me, time plays a significant role, with the range of events and dates being more extensive. The lyrics takes on a more direct descriptive manner rather the than the poetic style of his music before Castrée's death. In comparison to A Crow Looked at Me the lyrics are "stranger, sometimes facetious".

Elverum described the songs present on the album as "deeper and broader" than those on A Crow Looked at Me. Elverum sings in a direct, sing-speaking, "stream-of-consciousness" manner. Despite every song dealing explicitly with Castrée, the central focus of the album is Elverum and his perspective on death. His perspective ranges from "ruminative, cosmic existentialism to carefully observed banality".

The songs are musically similar to those on A Crow Looked at Me but longer, averaging seven minutes each, compared to A Crow Looked at Me's averaged less than four minutes. Elverum explained that the reason for this change was his interest in "having a more nuanced conversation." They have also been said to feature "richer instrumentation".

The songs also feature multiple movements and follow non-linear narratives. Just like A Crow Looked at Me the theme of the absurdity of performing intimate material in public while pretending otherwise is present as is the theme of contextualising death, particularly in the song "Two Paintings by Nikolai Alstrup". The theme of "shifts in memory and posterity" which Elverum called the theme of album is also present, such as in songs like "Distortion". The role of art within the grieving process is also a recurring motif.

=== Songs ===
The title of the song "Tintin in Tibet" refers to Tintin in Tibet, the twentieth volume of the comics series The Adventures of Tintin by Belgian cartoonist Hergé. A copy of Tintin in Tibet owned by Castrée previously appeared in the cover art of A Crow Looked at Me. Thematically similar to A Crow Looked at Me, the song details Elverum's memories of Castrée before her illness. It opens with a major chord. The song along with others on the album incorporates multiple tempo and instrument changes such as the transition from guitar chords to melodic riffs played on a classical guitar. The song also features cymbal crashes and snare rim hits.

The second track "Distortion", which has been described as an 11-minute epic, deals with the ideas of memory and mortality. Across its six verses, Elverum contemplates how one will be remembered and how Castrée lives on through his memories. It, like many of Elverum's past works, opens with heavy distorted guitars. Alongside that it features guitar arpeggios, distorted metal bass notes, vocal harmonies and piano trills. The instrumentation is evocative of his previous black metal work. The song references Jack Kerouac and his daughter with Elverum noting a resemblance between Castrée and Jan Kerouac. It also references Elverum's childhood memory of his great-grandfather's funeral in particular the impact of seeing his corpse and a pregnancy scare he experienced at age 23.

Musically the album features more diverse instrumentation than A Crow Looked at Me. with the piano led chorus of the title track featuring a major key melody, described by a press release as "pop"

The title track which has been described as the centerpiece of the album. It features a "playful" recitation of the phrase "People get cancer and die." It's notable in the context of the album and Elverum's discography as a whole due to it functioning as a hook which Elverum admits that he's "maybe never written" before. The phrase is intended to represent the "absurdity of everything" with the clash between the "catchy and pretty" instrumention and the grim lyrics representing "the clash between the facts and experiencing beauty and devastation in the same moment." Elverum reflects on his time spent in hospitals, the absurdity of playing his "death songs" to audiences at a music festival outside of Phoenix, Arizona and the success of A Crow Looked at Me. The song uses the Arizonan deserts as a reflection of Elverum's "self-discovery and coping."

In the song "Earth" Elverum references "I Will Lay Down My Bones Among the Rocks and Roots" by the Cascadian black metal band Wolves in the Throne Room," The song details Elverum discovering pieces of Castrée's bones in the area where he spread her ashes. Elverum was careful with how he portrayed this moment framing it not as gory, gratuitous, or shocking, merely a reflection of the truth. It features a grunge style opening reminiscent of his 2008 EP Black Wooden Ceiling Opening and his 2009 album Wind's Poem along with power chords, open hi-hats, finger-picked acoustic guitar and keyboard accompaniment.

"Two Paintings by Nikolai Astrup" refers to Norwegian painter Nikolai Astrup and his paintings Midsummer Eve Bonfire (ca. 1915) and Foxgloves (ca. 1920). Elverum chose Astrup upon realizing that the phenomenon of "observing the transition from a living person into a memory" he is experiencing with Castrée, once similarly happened to Astrup and to "every person who's ever been alive." The lyrics contain Elverum pondering the occurrence of his death such as flight over the Grand Canyon suddenly crashing. The opening lyrics "I Know No One" are a reference to the opening track on his 2005 album No Flashlight. The melody is reused from his song "Who?" from his 2008 album Lost Wisdom.

The final track "Crow, Pt. 2" is a continuation from "Crow", likewise the final track from A Crow Looked at Me. The song is more energetic than "Crow" although it still retains the previously established dark tone and features finger-picked acoustic guitar. While still directed to Castrée, Elverum's daughter is the central focus of the song, mentioning her sense of grief. Throughout the song and the album as a whole Elverum lists a "series of symbolic incarnations" of Castrée, the areas and ideas in which he sees Castrée (Note: Examples throughout the album include "in their front yard, on a ferry in Victoria, among big trees, gasping for breath on her deathbed, in the face of "this good daughter we made.") however he ultimately admits that he doesn't see her in anything, anymore.

== Release and promotion ==
On January 17, 2018, Elverum announced that he would release a new album and go on tour, performing select North American dates. Alongside the announcement Elverum released the first single "Distortion" to positive reviews, netting the "Best New Track" distinction from Pitchfork and being called the best song of the week by Under the Radar. The second single, "Tintin in Tibet" was released on February 20, 2018, again to positive reviews, appearing on Under the Radar's list of the 12 best songs of the week.

== Reception ==
Professional ratings
Aggregate scores
Source	Rating
AnyDecentMusic?	8.3/10
Metacritic	82/100
Review scores
Source	Rating
AllMusic	4/5 stars
The A.V. Club	A−
Exclaim!	9/10
The Guardian	3/5 stars
The Independent	4/5 stars
Paste	9.0/10
Pitchfork	8.5/10
PopMatters	7/10
Uncut	6/10
Vice	A

Now Only received critical acclaim. At Metacritic, which assigns a normalized rating out of 100 to reviews from music critics, the album has received an average score of 82, indicating "universal acclaim", based on 19 reviews. Sam Sodomsky of Pitchfork called it "part memoir and part magnum opus" and "his most harrowing and physical description of decay". Alexis Petridis of The Guardian said, "Elverum still sounds lost in fathomless pain, struggling to get on with his life while terrified of letting his wife's memory fade". Nick Hasted of The Independent wrote, "Its lyrics are a tidal, seemingly undifferentiated tumble". Robert Ham of Paste felt a personal connection to Elverum and his loss, relating it to the passing of Patton Oswalt's wife, writing, "Through the art that Elverum and Oswalt have made manifest in the wake of their wives dying, I feel like I know them with an uncomfortable intimacy. As much as I marvel at Annihilation or Now Only, I feel like I want them back on this planet, too." he also wrote, "Now Only is still as wrenching and direct as its predecessor, but concerns itself, at times, with the bitter truth that, sooner rather than later, he'll be gone, too".

Thomas Britt of Popmatters said that the album "will be of interest to Mount Eerie devotees but feels more downbeat and less necessary than its predecessor". Robert Christgau, writing for Vice, said, "you have to admire the no-fuss complexities of his survival album—in particular his realization that it isn't just the artist's body that can't survive, it's the artist's body of work". Skye Butchard of Loud and Quiet initially gave the album a perfect ten but later noted that rating the album or calling it a masterpiece "[seemed] wrong".

Many writers noted that the album sounded more hopeful than A Crow Looked at Me and had more diverse instrumentation. Heather Phares of AllMusic said, "this album isn't quite as devastatingly sad as its predecessor, and on songs such as "Crow, Pt. 2," there's a lightness when he sings "you're a quiet echo on a loud wind" that wasn't there before" and "his use of sound is even more evocative". The A.V. Club said, "Where Crow occupied a numb, purgatorial present tense, the new record leaps around like a wandering mind, to vivid anecdotes from the singer-songwriter's past". Alex Hudson of Exclaim! speaking of the more diverse instrumentation said, "the result is an emotionally nuanced meditation on death that is both heartbreaking and hopeful".

=== Accolades ===
Now Only appeared on numerous year-end top lists by several publications. Such as AllMusic, The Daily Emerald, Digital Trends, Earbuddy, Exclaim!, KCPR, Loud and Quiet, Noisey, NPR, Pitchfork, The Seattle Times, The Skinny, Slate, Tiny Mix Tapes, and Treblezine. Songs such as "Tintin in Tibet", "Distortion" and "Now Only" also appeared on year-end top lists by Treblezine, Pitchfork, and the Phoenix New Times, respectively. American singer-songwriter Kevin Morby included the album on his list of his favorite albums of 2018.

== Track listing ==
All tracks are written by Phil Elverum.

No.	Title	Length
1.	"Tintin in Tibet"	4:37
2.	"Distortion"	10:58
3.	"Now Only"	5:54
4.	"Earth"	5:52
5.	"Two Paintings by Nikolai Astrup"	9:22
6.	"Crow, Pt. 2"	6:50
Total length:		43:33

== Personnel ==
- Phil Elverum – songwriting, vocals, production, mixing, guitars, bass, drums, piano, keyboards

== Release history ==
Region	Label	Format	Category	Reference
United States	P. W. Elverum & Sun	Double LP, digital download	ELV041	
Japan	P. W. Elverum & Sun	CD	EPCD105	
