= Gigi Masin =

Italian composer (born 1955)

Background information
- Born: October 24, 1955 (age 71); Venice, Italy
- Genre: Ambient
- Occupations: Musician, composer, producer
- Instruments: Synthesizer, keyboards, guitar, vocals, trumpet
- Labels: Sacred Bones Records; The Numero Group; R & S Records; Music from Memory

Gigi Masin (born 24 October 1955) is an Italian composer, ambient musician and producer from Venice. He is known for his 1986 album Wind and as a member of the electronic music trio Gaussian Curve, alongside British musician Jonny Nash and Dutch DJ and producer Young Marco.

Gigi Masin's debut album, Wind, was privately pressed and initially distributed at small concerts in 1986. The album gradually gained recognition among DJs and record collectors. In 2014, the Dutch label Music from Memory released Talk to the Sea, a retrospective compilation of Masin's earlier recordings. The following year, Masin reissued Wind on his own label, The Bear on the Moon.

Gigi Masin has also released music through collaborations with the ambient trio Gaussian Curve, alongside Jonny Nash and Young Marco, and the Italian electronic music duo Tempelhof. His subsequent releases have included solo albums and further collaborative projects.

== Biography ==
=== Early life ===
Masin began playing guitar before becoming a radio presenter and DJ at the age of 18. He hosted a late-night programme on public radio for approximately ten years. During this period, he experimented with turntables, tape loops and sound effects. In the late 1970s, he also created sound collages while working with theatres in Venice. These experiments contributed to the development of his debut album, Wind, which was privately released in 1986.

=== 1986–1991 ===
Masin's first release, Wind, was privately issued in 1986 and distributed at concerts.

In 1989, Masin collaborated with British musician and This Heat member Charles Hayward on the split album Les Nouvelles Musiques de Chambre, Vol. 2, released by the Belgian label Sub Rosa. The track "Clouds", from Masin's contribution to the release, was later sampled by artists including Björk, Nujabes and To Rococo Rot.

In 1991, he released the collaborative album The Wind Collector with Alessandro Monti on Marco Pandin's label Divergo (now Stella*Nera).

After this release, Masin stepped away from music to raise his family and work for Poste Italiane.

=== 2001–2020s ===
After nearly a decade long hiatus, Masin reappeared on the scene with the solo album Lontano (2001) and the collaborative album Moltitudine in Labirinto (2003) with Giuseppe Caprioli, both on Giovanni Antognozzi's Ants Records.

In 2007, a flood in Venice destroyed much of Masin's work, including tapes, records and musical equipment. The event discouraged him from making music for a time. He later returned to recording after a friend encouraged him to produce a new album, prompting him to buy a computer and begin a new phase of music production.

He recorded The Last DJ (2008) and Infanthree (2010) for the Italian netlabel Laverna, followed by a series of artistic video creations with visual artists such as the painter and designer Luis Filipe Cunha.

In 2014, the Dutch label Music from Memory released Talk to the Sea, a retrospective compilation spanning more than 30 years of Masin's musical output. The compilation brought together previously released and unreleased recordings from his earlier career. Label founders Jamie Tiller and Tako Reyenga selected the material in consultation with Masin.

Through Music from Memory, Masin met British producer Jonny Nash and Dutch DJ and producer Marco Sterk, also known as Young Marco. Together, they formed the ambient music trio Gaussian Curve, releasing their debut album Clouds in 2015 and the follow-up The Distance in 2017, both on Music from Memory.

Another collaboration began in 2014, following a show in Mantua (Italy), with Luciano Ermondi and Paolo Mazzacani of the duo Tempelhof which resulted in two albums – Hoshi (2014) and Tsuki (2016) – two EP of remixes and two singles, all released on the Italian label Hell Yeah Recordings.

In 2016 came Stella, with Elia Perrone, founder of the releasing Italian label Unclear, and two releases on the label 13 – Venezia, a CD attached to the limited print book Il Silenzio Dei Tuoi Passi, a photographic collection depicting Gigi's hometown of Venezia at night time, by Stefano Gentile; and Playing Hazkará.

Two compilations on Suburbia Records, a sub-label of the Japanese DIW Products Group, came in 2017, followed by the self-released album Kite in 2018 and the collaborative album Postcards from Nowhere (2019) with Jonny Nash on Melody As Truth.

The latter includes six adapted pieces, originally recorded live in 2017 inside the French Pavilion of La Biennale in Venice, temporarily transformed into a recording studio by artist and frequent collaborator Xavier Veilhan; during their residency, the duo recorded original content from improvised compositions with Masin on the guitar and Nash on the piano, using different microphone techniques. London-based design and branding agency Commission Studio curated the art direction and photography of the LP, in collaboration with the photographer Luke Evans and Imprimerie du Marais, a Paris-based print atelier.

At the onset of the new decade Apollo – the ambient division of R & S Records – released Calypso.

Gigi has appeared on PAN as part of Lifted, a group spearheaded by Future Times founder Andrew Field-Pickering (Max D / Beautiful Swimmers), also featuring Matthew Papich (Co La), Jeremy Hyman (Avey Tare's Slasher Flicks), Motion Graphix, Jordan Czamanski (Juju & Jordash), and Dawit Eklund (1432 R). A series of singles came on Throne of Blood, Dekmantel, and Light in the Attic Records, along with dates at festivals, galleries, and opening for Oneohtrix Point Never and Devendra Banhart.

=== 2026–present ===
In 2026, Masin's debut album Wind (1986) was reissued by the American independent record label The Numero Group to mark its fortieth anniversary. The reissue features a remastered and restored version of the original album, while the digital edition includes five previously unreleased tracks from the original recording sessions. It was released on 30 October 2026.

Initially distributed in limited quantities, Wind gradually gained recognition among DJs and record collectors in the years following its release. To Gigi the album also reflects his sense of belonging to his native city: Venice. He views Wind as a meditation on many things, not least nature. In an interview he said: “Wind is something you can’t capture, it’s free, and the wind is so strong in Venice, it can be very hard to handle. Wind is lovely but at the same time, it is like life – love and hate, good and bad, you think you can control it, but you can’t. For me there is such a metaphor in nature.”

Masin's music has also attracted attention through sampling. His track "Clouds", from Les Nouvelles Musiques de Chambre, Vol. 2, was sampled by artists including Björk, Nujabes and To Rococo Rot.

In May 2026, Masin released Movement, his first solo album since Calypso (2020), on the American independent label Sacred Bones Records. Released on 29 May 2026, the album comprises nine tracks and incorporates rhythmic and techno-influenced elements into his ambient sound.

== Discography ==
=== Albums ===
- Wind (1986)
- Les Nouvelles Musiques de Chambre, Vol. 2 (1989) (split with Charles Hayward)
- The Wind Collector (1991) (with Alessandro Monti)
- Lontano (2001)
- Moltitudine in Labirinto (2003) (with Giuseppe Caprioli)
- The Last DJ (2008)
- Hoshi (2014) (with Tempelhof)
- Clouds (2015) (with Gaussian Curve)
- Live at Superbudda (2015)
- Plays Hazkará (2016)
- Venezia 2016 (2016)
- Tsuki (2016) (with Tempelhof)
- The Distance (2017) (with Gaussian Curve)
- Kite (2018)
- Postcards from Nowhere (2019) (with Jonny Nash)
- Calypso (2020)
- Vahiné (2022)
- Dolphin (2023) (with Greg Foat)
- The Fish Factory Sessions (2024)
- Movement (2026)

=== Reissues ===
- Wind (40th Anniversary Edition) (2026)

=== Singles and EPs ===
- Closer
- Tuvalu (2015) (with Tempelhof)
- Hoshi (remixed) (2015) (with Tempelhof) 12”
- Stella (2016) (with Elia Perrone) 12”
- Tsuki (remixes) (2016) (with Tempelhof)
- Clouds (2016) 12”
- Cornersong (2018) (with Tempelhof) 12”
- Kite (2018) 7”
- Anemone (2019)

=== Compilations ===
- Talk to the Sea (2014)
- The Wind Collector / As Witness our Hands (2016) (with Alessandro Monti and Alessandro Pizzin)
- Gigi Masin for Good Mellows (2017)

=== Collaborations ===
- Dolphin, Greg Foat and Gigi Masin, Strut311LP, 2023
