= Jacobikerk =

Church in Utrecht, Netherlands

Coordinates: 52°05′42″N 5°06′55″E

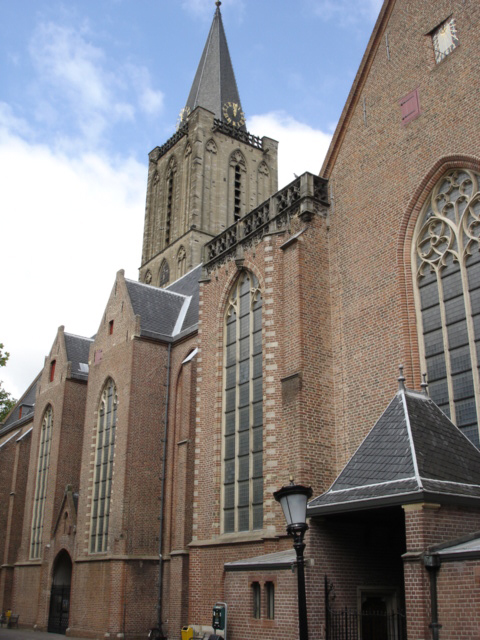
Jacobikerk

The Jacobikerk is a landmark Protestant church in Utrecht, Netherlands. The building is located on the St Jacobsstraat, named for its patron saint St. James the Greater. The church is one of the medieval parish churches of Utrecht, along with the Buurkerk, the Nikolaïkerk and the Geertekerk. Today it is known as the starting place for Dutch pilgrims on their way to Santiago de Compostela along the Way of St. James. The Dutch Confraternity of St. James is located around the corner on the St. Jacobskerkhof.

== History ==
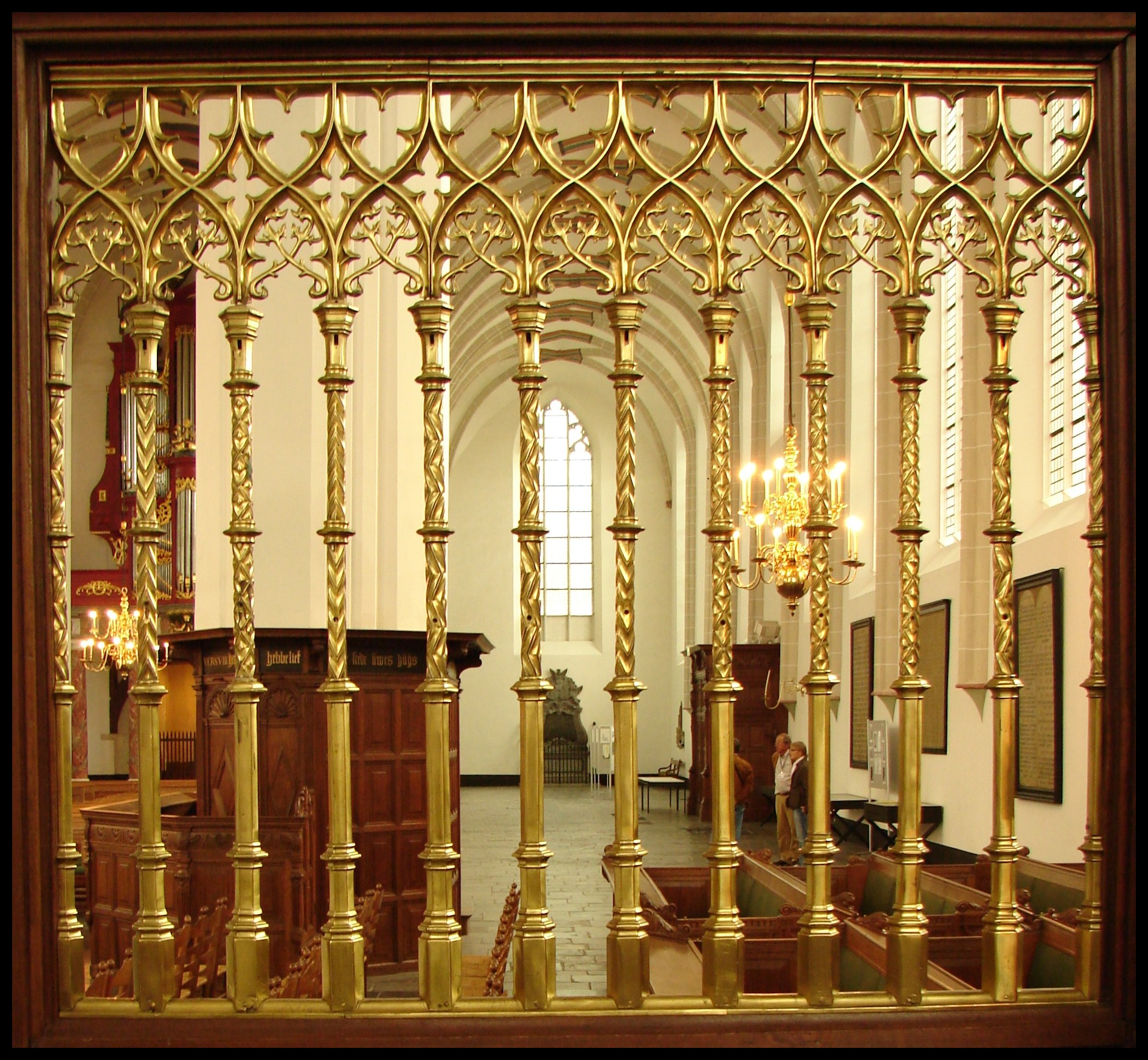
Interior seen through the late Gothic rood screen

The current gothic church dates from the end of the 13th century, but was expanded in the 14th and 15th centuries. In 1576-1577 a cannon was installed in the church tower, aimed at Vredenburg Castle where the Spanish soldiers there were under siege by the Utrecht schutters. Around 1580 the church endured the Protestant Reformation and in 1586 it was formally handed over to the protestants, who whitewashed the wall decorations and removed the altarpieces.

The tower bell was made by S. Butendiic in 1479, with a diameter of 182 cm.

== Church function ==
The church still accommodates weekly Sunday services, but is regularly rented out for other functions, including weddings and concerts, but also for various cultural initiatives of the city or the local university.
