= Palisade (disambiguation) =

A palisade is a steel or wooden fence or wall of variable height, usually used as a defensive structure.

Palisade, palisades or palisading also may refer to:

== Geology ==
- Columnar basalt, a common extrusive igneous (volcanic) rock formed from the rapid cooling of basaltic lava exposed at or very near the surface of a planet
  - List of places with columnar jointed volcanics

Canada

- Jasper Palisade, a mountain formation in Jasper National Park, Alberta

United States

- Palisades Sill, an intrusive igneous body that forms the cliffs largely following the southern portion of the Hudson River
  - The Palisades (Hudson River), cliffs along the Hudson River in the US states of New York and New Jersey
- Palisades (California Sierra), a group of peaks in the Sierra Nevada range of east-central California
  - Palisade Glacier, California
- The Palisades (Napa County), a mountain range in the northern San Francisco Bay Area, California
- The Palisade (Colorado), a butte in Mesa County, Colorado
- Palisade Head, a headland on the North Shore of Lake Superior in Minnesota
- Mississippi Palisades State Park, encompassing cliffs along the Mississippi River in northwestern Illinois
- Kentucky River Palisades, cliffs along the Kentucky River in central Kentucky
- Palisades State Park, cliffs along Split Rock Creek in southeastern South Dakota
- The Palisades (Green River, Wyoming), cliffs west of Green River near Interstate 80.

== Communities ==
Canada

- Palisade, Saskatchewan
- The Palisades, Edmonton

United States

- Pacific Palisades, Los Angeles, California, a neighborhood
- Palisade, Colorado
- Palisade, Minnesota
- Palisade, Nebraska
- Palisade, Nevada
- Palisades, New York
- Palisades, Texas
- Palisades Park, New Jersey
- The Palisades, Washington, D.C., a neighborhood

== Places ==
- Palisades Amusement Park, former amusement park in Bergen County, New Jersey
  - Palisades Park (Freddy Cannon song), a hit song by Freddy Cannon
  - Palisades Park (Counting Crows song), a song by Counting Crows
- Palisade Avenue (Hudson Palisades) in Hudson and Bergen, New Jersey
- Palisades Center, a major shopping center in West Nyack, New York
- Palisades Charter High School, in Los Angeles, California
- Palisades Dam, Idaho
- Palisades Interstate Parkway, a highway in New York and New Jersey
- Palisades Nuclear Generating Station, in Van Buren County, Michigan
- Palisades School District, in northeastern Bucks County, Pennsylvania
- Palisades Tahoe, a ski resort in Olympic Valley, California

== Biology ==
- Palisade cell, a type of cell found in plant leaves
- Palisade (pathology), a single layer of relatively long cells

== Music ==
- Palisades (band), an American post-hardcore/hardcore band from Iselin, New Jersey
- Palisades (music venue), a former live music venue in Bushwick, Brooklyn
- "Palisades", a song by Angels of Light from the album Everything Is Good Here / Please Come Home
- "Palisades", a song by Puressence from the album Don't Forget to Remember
- "The Palisades", a song by Childish Gambino on his STN MTN / Kauai EP

== Other ==
- Hyundai Palisade, a 2018–present South Korean mid-size SUV
- PALISADE (software), an encryption software library
- Palisades Toys, a company that produced action figures and other collectibles
- Palisades Fire, a catastrophic wildfire that burned in Pacific Palisades, Topanga and Malibu, California in January 2025
