= Doug Hoyer =

Canadian musician

- Born: Edmonton, Alberta, Canada
- Genres: Pop; baroque pop; indie rock
- Instrument: Bass
- Website: doughoyer.com

Doug Hoyer is a Canadian musician originally from Edmonton and currently based in Chicago. Since 2009, he has been a member of the Edmonton-based music collective OLD UGLY Recording Co. Active since 2003, Hoyer began as a cast member of the reality show Rock Camp, which aired on CBC Television in 2004 and featured Joel Plaskett with various guests. Hoyer has released ten solo recordings and performed on several other releases by artists such as Born Gold and Jessica Jalbert.

== Career ==
Hoyer has toured Canada multiple times since 2008, including once with Sean Nicholas Savage, once with Michael Rault, and twice with Edmonton hip hop outfit the Joe. He has played in and collaborated with numerous artists, including Jessica Jalbert, Christian Hansen, and Born Gold. Hoyer's side project, Bike Month, has featured extensive collaboration with dozens of his cohort, including Andy Shauf, Jessica Jalbert, and Michael Rault.

In 2012, Hoyer was nominated for two Edmonton Music Awards, one for Male Artist of the Year and one for Pop Album of the Year. In 2014, he opened for St. Vincent at Sled Island Music & Arts Festival in Calgary. In 2015, Hoyer and songwriter Jeremy Witten represented the City of Edmonton in Nashville at World of Friendship, Nashville's annual Sister Cities celebration. Though currently based in Chicago, Hoyer returned to Edmonton in May 2018 to celebrate the release of his EP A Trio of Quartets with Baby Jey, Tropic Harbor, and Mark Mills.

== Discography ==
=== Solo ===
- Tattoo EP (2007)
- Songs from Grand Marquee EP (2008)
- Busy Busy Busy EP (2009)
- Walks with the Tender and Growing Night (2011)
- To Be a River (2013)
- Blood Döner EP (2014)
- Dream Life (2015)
- Stepping Stone (2017)
- A Trio of Quartets (2018)
- Character Witness (2019)
- Getting Older (2021)

=== With Bike Month ===
- Bike Month (2009)
- Ultimate Sunset Vol. 1: My Album with Andre (2010)
- III: Bike to the Future (2015)
