= Baby Jey (Canadian band) =

Indie rock band

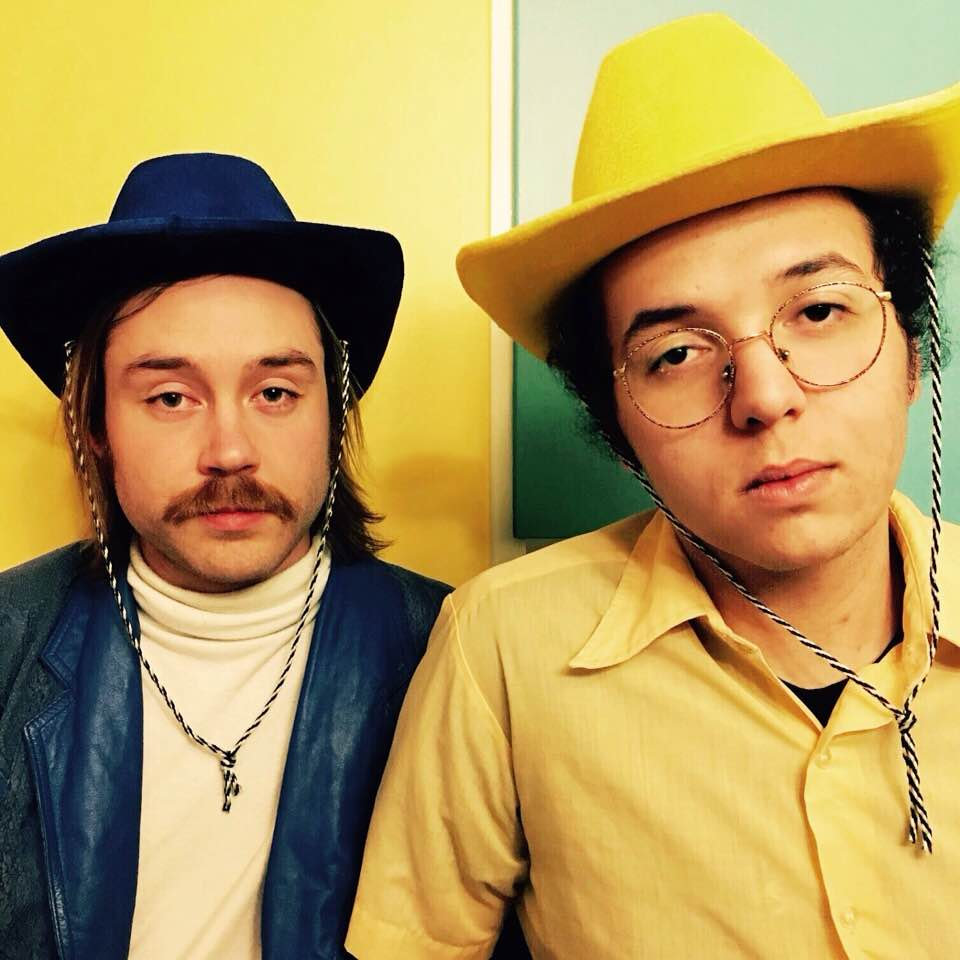
- Baby Jey in 2017 (left to right) Jeremy Witten, Dean Kheroufi

Background information
- Origin: Edmonton, Alberta, Canada
- Genres: Indie rock; cowboy pop
- Years active: 2015–present
- Label: Maintenance Records
- Members: Jeremy Witten; Dean Kheroufi; Connor Ellinger; Trevor McNeely
- Website: babyjey.ca

Baby Jey is a Canadian indie rock band based in Edmonton, Alberta, founded in 2015 by core members Jeremy Witten (guitar, keyboards, lead vocals) and Dean Kheroufi (bass, backing vocals). In 2017, Baby Jey started performing as a four-piece band with the addition of Trevor McNeely (lap steel guitar) and Connor Ellinger (drums). The band was previously based in Brooklyn, New York, around the release of their 2018 album Someday Cowboy, before returning to Edmonton where they recorded their 2023 album Crop Circles.

== History ==
Prior to forming Baby Jey, Jeremy Witten and Dean Kheroufi were active in other musical projects. From 2013 to 2015, Witten performed solo under the name Jey Witten, releasing two independent albums Jey Witten (2013) and The Wide Eyed (2014). As a solo performer, Witten was awarded at the Calgary Folk Music Festival's Songwriting Contest and he performed at the Canmore Folk Music Festival in 2014. At this time, Kheroufi continued to perform in other projects, including the Edmonton-based band The Velveteins.

Baby Jey's debut album Best Wishes was produced by Renny Wilson and released in May 2017. The Edmonton Journal called Best Wishes "oddly entertaining," and the album charted on CJSR-FM and the CKUA Radio Network. Best Wishes received favorable coverage in Canadian and American music blogs and podcasts. Following the release of their debut album, Baby Jey toured in Canada and the United States. Baby Jey have shared stages with artists such as Michael Rault, New Love Crowd, and Jessica Jalbert of Faith Healer.

In July 2018, Baby Jey announced that their sophomore album Someday Cowboy would be released on Brooklyn label Maintenance Records in September 2018. Following the release of Someday Cowboy, Baby Jey relocated to Brooklyn, New York. The lead single of the album, titled "Someday My Space Cowboy Will Come," was premiered by Indie88. In 2019, Baby Jey was nominated for an Edmonton Music Award in the People's Choice category.

On September 21, 2023, Baby Jey released their single What's The Point Of Saying Sorry. The duo revealed via Tone Den that this was the first single off of their Crop Circles LP, due on November 24 of the same year. They say about the single:

"What's the Point of Saying Sorry" was inspired by classic disco and synth pop.

== Discography ==
=== Albums ===
- Best Wishes (2017)
- Someday Cowboy (2018)

=== Singles and EPs ===
- Veneera (2018)
- What's The Point Of Saying Sorry (2023)
