= Maintenance Records =

- Founded: 2016
- Founder: Brandon Kirshner
- Genre: Pop music; indie rock
- Location: Brooklyn, New York

Maintenance Records is an independent record label and concert promotion company founded by Brandon Kirshner in Brooklyn, New York. Acting as both a label and booking company, Maintenance is involved in artist development, management, and concert promotion for its roster.

== History ==
Maintenance began in 2016 as a concert promotion company, focusing exclusively on concert bookings in New York City. In 2016 and 2017, Maintenance promoted concerts for Juan Wauters, Fletcher C. Johnson, Useless Eaters, Bodega Bay, and Honey Bucket. During its first few years of existence, Maintenance presented concerts at Mercury Lounge in Manhattan, as well as at several venues in Brooklyn including Palisades, Sunnyvale, Shea Stadium and Brooklyn Bazaar.

While booking numerous concerts in Brooklyn and Manhattan, founder Brandon Kirshner began developing relationships with several unsigned bands in Brooklyn. This led to Maintenance's decision to expand from a concert promotion company to a record label. In 2018, Maintenance Records signed Hotel Pools, Buena Puente and Baby Jey. Someday Cowboy, Baby Jey's sophomore album, was released on Maintenance Records in September 2018. In January 2019, Maintenance released New Love Crowd's single "Cotton Candy."

== Roster ==
- Baby Jey
- Buena Puente
- Hotel Pools
- New Love Crowd
- Post Game Press
