= Renny Wilson =

Canadian singer-songwriter

- Origin: Edmonton, Alberta, Canada
- Genre: pop lo-fi disco
- Occupations: Musician, songwriter, producer, recording engineer
- Years active: mid-'00s–present
- Label: Mint
- Members: René Wilson, Mitch Holtby, Jenni Roberts, Jon Lent, Ross Nicoll, Kelsie Hjorliefson, Lindsay Coulton, Nyssa Brown, Martine Ménard, Jessica Jalbert, Jim Cuming, Martin Wilson, Michael Rault
- Past members: Aidan Lucas-Buckland, Liam Trimble, Garrett Johnson
- Website: rennywilson.com

Renny Wilson is a Canadian pop singer-songwriter, record producer, recording engineer, and director. He has recorded as a solo artist, performed as a member of The Subatomics, and as a member of other bands such as Michael Rault, Faith Healer and Brazilian Money.

== History ==
In 2012, Renny Wilson self-released his debut solo album Sugarglider. In November 2012, he was signed to Mint Records, who re-released the album on January 22, 2013. Beatroute said of the re-release, "the whole album is stuffed full of lush synth layers and endless saxophone riffs which have the album reeking of 1980s cheese in the best possible way," and noted the performer's "self-deprecating geeky style." Around the time of the re-release of Sugarglider, Wilson reported he was working on a follow-up to his debut with the working title "Goddess Fear."

In June 2014, he self-released a genre shifting mini-album entitled Punk Explosion on cassette. An extended LP version of this album entitled Punk Explosion/ Extension was released on the Mint Records label on July 10, 2015. He said at the time, "Aside from the years and the time it took to release it, Punk Explosion took almost no time compared to that Sugarglider record. I spent like no time mixing it, I spent no time mastering it, and that's probably why it sounds so terrible."

In October 2022, his directorial debut was released, a music video for Faith Healer's "Another Fool".

In 2024, Wilson recorded and mixed Montréal band Laughing's debut album Because It's True at Value Sound.

== Discography ==
=== Albums ===
- Sugarglider (Mint Records, 2012/2013)
- Punk Explosion (Value Records, 2014)
- Punk Explosion/ Extension (Mint Records, 2015)

=== Production credits ===
- Brother Loyola by Jessica Jalbert (Old Ugly Recording Co, 2011)
- Cosmic Troubles by Faith Healer (Mint Records, 2015)
- Familiar Touch by DIANA (Culvert Music, 2016)
- Best Wishes by Baby Jey (Cutey Music Group, 2017)
- Try ;-) by Faith Healer (Mint Records, 2017)
- Baby Only You & I by Anemone (Luminelle, 2018)
- Because It's True by Laughing (Meritorio/Celluloid Lunch, 2024)
