= Faith healer (disambiguation) =

A faith healer is someone who practices prayers and gestures that are believed to elicit divine intervention in spiritual and physical healing.

(The) Faith Healer(s) may also refer to:

- Faith Healer, a 1979 play by Brian Friel
- Faith Healer (band), a Canadian indie rock band
- "Faith Healer" (song), a 2020 song by Julien Baker
- The Faith Healer, a 1909 play by William Vaughn Moody
  - The Faith Healer, a 1921 American silent drama film directed by George Melford
- "The Faith Healer", a song by the Sensational Alex Harvey Band from the 1973 album Next
- The Faith Healers, a 1987 book by James Randi
- Th' Faith Healers, a 1990s English indie rock band

== See also ==
- The Faith Healer of Olive Avenue, a 2007 short story collection by Manuel Muñoz
