= Gateway Canyons Resort & Spa =

- Interactive map of the Gateway Canyons Resort & Spa area

General information
- Type: resort & spa
- Location: Mesa, Colorado, Gateway, United States
- Coordinates: 38.678374°N 108.981993°W

Website
- Gateway Canyons

Gateway Canyons Resort & Spa is located in Gateway, Colorado. In 2014, it was ranked by Conde Nast Traveler readers as the #12 resort in the world, #3 resort in the U.S. and the #1 resort in Colorado. It sits at the confluence of five canyons, the only resort in the world to do so. Created by the founder of the Discovery Channel, John Hendricks, he established the hotel using the same philosophy that had led to his creation of Discovery, to create a resort which was "not a leisure getaway but an arena for adventure and education, a place where guests could learn about the world around them and experience nature firsthand." Gateway Canyons offers many activities related to exploring curiosity, including an off-road adventure which consists of being driven around a two-mile track by a professional off-road driver in a customized Pro-Baja truck. Curiosity Retreats are hosted at Gateway Canyons Resort & Spa once a year, where lectures are filmed for later distribution via CuriosityStream. The resort includes a museum of automobiles, which spans cars from the early days of the auto industry through the new electric vehicles produced by Tesla Motors. The resort underwent a $20 million upgrade in 2011, after entering into a partnership agreement with Noble House Hotels and Resorts.
