= Rubber Rodeo =

American alternative country and cowboy pop band

- Origin: Providence, Rhode Island
- Genres: New wave; country rock; cowboy pop; alternative country
- Years active: 1980–1989
- Labels: Mercury Records; Polygram
- Past members: Doug Allen; Barc Holmes; Bob Holmes; Gary Leib (deceased); Trish Milliken; Eddie Stern; Mark Tomeo

Rubber Rodeo was an American, Rhode Island–based band active in the 1980s. The band fused Roxy Music–influenced new wave music with country and western influences, and dressed in 1950s-vintage country and western clothing. Their 1984 release "Anywhere With You" reached No. 86 on the Billboard Hot 100.

== History ==
=== 1980–1983: Foundation and early years ===
Rubber Rodeo was founded in Rhode Island in 1980, and initially consisted of Bob Holmes (vocals, guitars), Trish Milliken (vocals, keyboards), Gary Leib (synthesisers), Eddie Stern (pedal steel), Doug Allen (bass) and Bob's brother Barc Holmes (drums). Almost all were students at the Rhode Island School of Design, and lead singers Holmes and Milliken were also romantically involved. Bob Holmes later described the band as "a cross between Gene Autry and Devo". Others noted that when Milliken was singing, Rubber Rodeo sounded something like a countrified Blondie.

Most of the band's material consisted of original songs composed by Bob Holmes, or by the team of Holmes and Milliken. However, the group also recorded takes on country and western classics such as Ennio Morricone's "The Good, The Bad and The Ugly" and the Patsy Cline standard "Walkin' After Midnight". As well, their first independently released single was a cover of Dolly Parton's "Jolene" in 1981. Shortly after this single was released, pedal steel guitarist Stern left the band, to be replaced by Mark Tomeo. Commenting on a 1982 live performance, The Boston Phoenix observed that "Rubber Rodeo are smart enough to present themselves as straights who find hipness in songs neglected by new-wave audiences as too quaint ('Jolene') or too corny ('Wichita Lineman')."

=== 1984: Scenic Views ===
After two independent EP releases, on Eat Records, in 1982 and 1983, the band recorded their full-length debut Scenic Views (1984) for Mercury Records. The sessions were not without tension: producer Hugh Jones used a Linn drum machine rather than letting Barc Holmes play, and bassist Allen played only on a portion of the track "Walkin' After Midnight" before being let go by the band. Former Rubber Rodeo producer John Doelp took over on bass for the remainder of the sessions, and was credited with "bass and musical direction" on the final release, although he was not an official member of the group. After the album was made, bassist Hal Cragin was added to the line-up for live work; he also appears as bassist and band member in the videos shot for the Scenic Views album.

Despite the difficulties in making the record, Scenic Views was a moderately successful release. The LP's first single "The Hardest Thing" failed to chart, but the video received significant MTV airplay. The album's second video "Anywhere With You" also received MTV play, and the "Anywhere With You" single was a minor hit in the US, reaching no. 86 on the US Billboard Hot 100 singles chart. Rubber Rodeo's fusion of new wave and country music on the album led music critic J.D. Considine to coin the term "cowboy pop" in his review published in Musician.

Later in 1984, the band picked up a Grammy nomination for a long-form video they made for Scenic Views. The video was produced by Second Story Television and written and directed by David Greenberg. The home video release also included the music video for their early Eat Records single, "How The West Was Won".

=== 1986: Heartbreak Highway ===
Before recording their follow-up album, the band's line-up was reshuffled again. Tomeo departed, to be replaced by Ray Gantek on pedal steel and dobro.

The band's second album, 1986's Heartbreak Highway, was produced by Ken Scott, who had previously produced albums by David Bowie and Devo. However, the album was not a commercial success and the band was subsequently dropped by their label. Nevertheless, the group soldiered on for a while, with Reeves Gabrels taking over from Gantek as Rubber Rodeo's steel guitarist.

=== Break-up and later careers ===
The band split up by the end of the 1980s, with their final recording appearing on a 1991 tribute album honouring Duplex Planet poetry naif Ernest Noyes Brookings. By this point, bassist Allen had returned to the group and Rubber Rodeo was credited as a quartet of Bob Holmes, Trish Milliken, Gary Leib, and Doug Allen. Holmes and Milliken's marriage came to an end in the 1990s about the same time they had their child Zane Holmes.

Bob Holmes (not to be confused with guitarist Robert Holmes from the new wave band 'Til Tuesday) went on to a successful production career for artists ranging from David Bowie to Nils Lofgren, and now produces multi-media in New York City. In 2011, Holmes formed a new band called The Crusty Gentlemen, with original Rubber Rodeo bassist Doug Allen, pedal steel guitarist Jonathan Gregg, bassist Roger Moley, and banjo player Jeffrey Freidberg. The "Crusties" perform covers of classic bluegrass/country songs, with the occasional cover of popular songs such as, "Sweet Child O' Mine," originally done by Guns N' Roses. Both Doug Allen and Gary Leib, meanwhile, drew upon their art school backgrounds and became noted cartoonists. Elsewhere, Reeves Gabrels moved to London and joined David Bowie's band Tin Machine; and Tomeo, Cragin, and Gantek all carved out careers as notable session musicians. Rubber Rodeo did get back together to record a third album some time in the 1990s, but it has never seen release.

In November 2007, Gary Leib was interviewed for the Alternative Classix podcast, where he discussed Rubber Rodeo's history and legacy.

Bob Holmes and Gary Leib performed in a new project named SUSS, that has been referred to as “ambient country" music. SUSS released three albums as of December 2020.

Leib died in 2021, aged 65. Suss has continued, with Holmes and compatriots continuing to release new albums under the Suss banner.

== Discography ==
=== Albums ===
EPs

- Rubber Rodeo (1982 Eat Records)
1. "The Theme for Rubber Rodeo" (1:35)
2. "Jolene" (4:17)
3. "Slippin' Away" (4:08)
4. "How the West Was Won" (3:26)
5. "Tumblin' Tumbleweeds" (2:36)
6. "True Confessions" (2:58)
- She Had to Go... (1982 Eat Records)
1. "She Had to Go..." (5:11)
2. "The Good, the Bad, and the Ugly" (2:44)
3. "Forbidden Valley" (3:59)

LPs

- Scenic Views (1984 Eat Records)
1. "Need You, Need Me" (4:39)
2. "Slow Me Down" (3:31)
3. "Anywhere With You" (4:40)
4. "Walking After Midnight" (3:56)
5. "City of God" (5:13)
6. "The Hardest Thing" (3:15)
7. "House of Pain" (4:45)
8. "Mess o' Me" (5:03)
9. "Before I Go Away (5:57)
10. "Woman of Straw" (4:20)*
- Heartbreak Highway (1986 Mercury Records)
1. "Heartbreak Highway" (4:33)
2. "If You're Ever Alone" (4:10)
3. "Everybody's Talkin'" (3:40)
4. "Souvenir" (3:48)
5. "The Civil War" (4:14)
6. "Deadtown" (4:43)
7. "When Words Collide" (4:13)
8. "Look Who's Back" (4:11)
9. "Maybe Next Year" (4:28)

-*on CD and cassette releases

=== Singles ===
- "Jolene" (1981)
- "She Had To Go" (1982)
- "The Hardest Thing" (1984)
- "Anywhere With You" (1984)
- "Everybody's Talkin'" (1986)
- "Souvenir" (1986)
