= Velveteen (disambiguation) =

Velveteen is a type of cloth.

Velveteen may also refer to:

- Velveteen (album) by Transvision Vamp
- "Velveteen", a song from the Ghost in the Shell:Stand Alone Complex original soundtrack
- "Velveteen", a song by Alvvays from Blue Rev
- "Velveteen", a song by Sponge from Wax Ecstatic

== See also ==
- The Velveteins, Canadian rock band
- The Velvet Teen, American indie rock band
- Velveteen Dream, professional wrestler
