= Someday Cowboy =

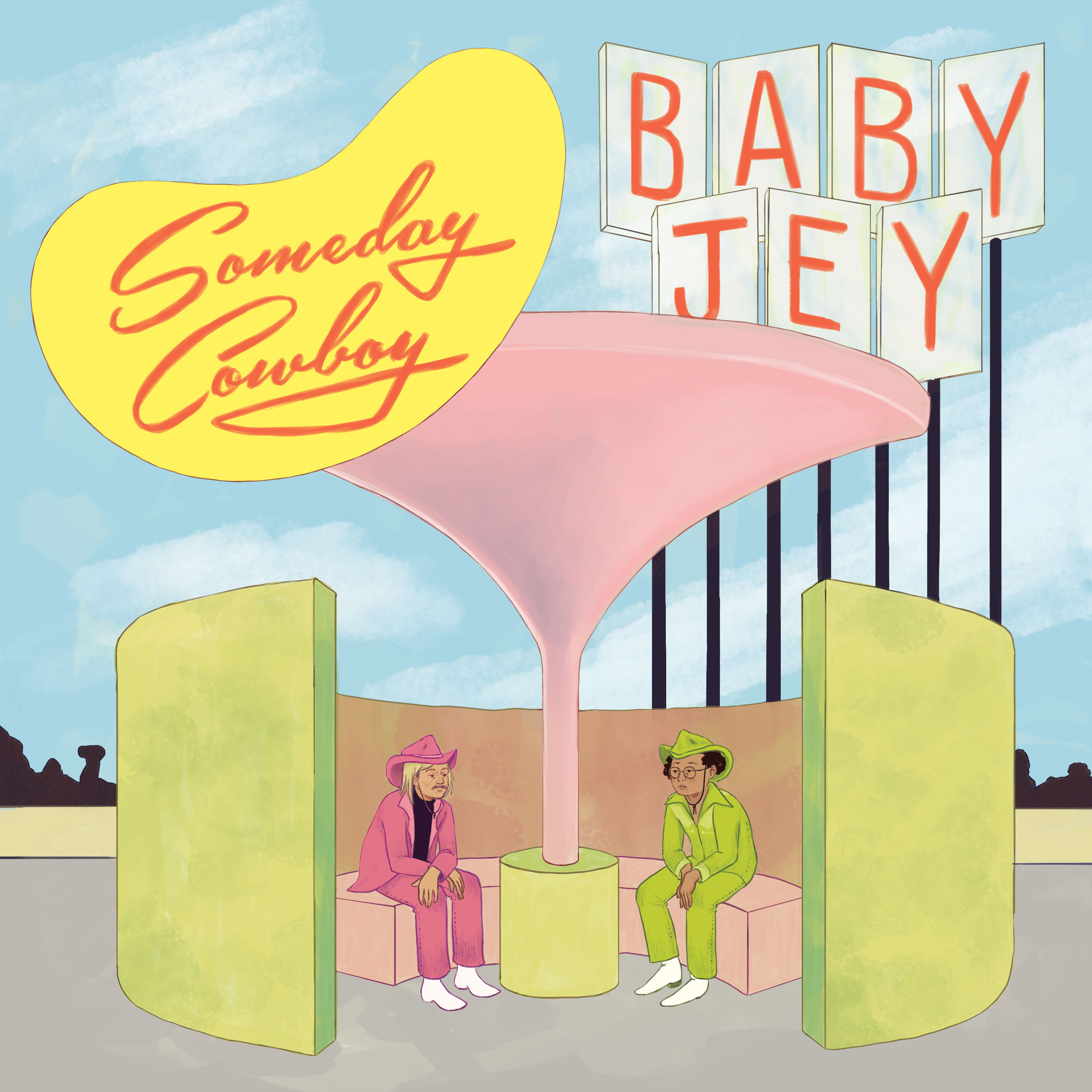

Studio album by Baby Jey
- Released: September 14, 2018
- Genre: Indie rock; cowboy pop
- Length: 31:57
- Label: Maintenance Records

Baby Jey chronology
Best Wishes (2017)	Someday Cowboy (2018)

Singles from Someday Cowboy
- 1. "Someday My Space Cowboy Will Come" Released: July 27, 2018; 2. "U Don't Have 2 Go Alone" Released: August 24, 2018; 3. "Every Thing" Released: December 20, 2018

Someday Cowboy is the second studio album by Canadian indie rock band Baby Jey, released in September 2018 by Maintenance Records.

== Background ==
Someday Cowboy was recorded in two days in the childhood home of lead singer Jeremy Witten. The album's lead single, "Someday My Space Cowboy Will Come," was released on 27 July 2018 and premiered by Indie88. "U Don't Have 2 Go Alone," the album's second single, was premiered by Earmilk on 24 August 2018.

On 20 December 2018, Baby Jey premiered "Every Thing," the album's third single and accompanying music video, via Exclaim Magazine.

== Reception ==
In Vue Weekly, Jeff MacCallum distinguished the album from Baby Jey's previous release Best Wishes, stating that "the nine songs delivered on this outing work together to make a cohesive listen which was lacking on their debut." Writing for the magazine BeatRoute, Kennedy Pawluk focused more specifically on the musical styles featured on the album, calling it "a light-hearted pop record at its core [that] shares a twang reminiscent of golden era country greats." Obscure Sound wrote that on Someday Cowboy, Witten's songwriting "showcases a nostalgia within the lyrics." The Deli Magazine called the album "charming and odd yet accessible."

== Charts ==
Despite the fact that Baby Jey was founded in Canada, Someday Cowboy initially charted higher on American radio stations than it did on Canadian stations. The album hit #1 on KJHK in Kansas in November 2018, but did not hit #1 on CJSR-FM in Edmonton until late January 2019. The album also reached #6 on CFMU in Hamilton, #7 on CHRW in London, and #8 on CJSW in Calgary. Someday Cowboy peaked at #80 on Muzooka Radio Chart and #95 and on the NACC Top 200.

== Tracklisting ==
1. Hannah Holliday's Son
2. U Don't Have 2 Go Alone
3. Toboggan
4. Someday My Space Cowboy Will Come
5. Hundred Percent
6. Bernice Kentner
7. Teach Me 2 Forget
8. Every Thing
9. I Accept

== Personnel ==
Per the liner notes.

=== Musicians ===
- Andi Vissia – Mandolin
- Cameron O’Neill – Drums
- Dean Kheroufi - Bass
- Jeremy Witten - Guitar, piano, vocals
- Nathan Burns - Dobro
- Ross Nicoll – Keyboards
- Trevor McNeely - Lap steel guitar
- Zia Mizera – Violin

=== Production ===
- Ben Mike - Overdub engineering on tracks 4, 6, 8, and 9
- Mitch Holtby - Engineering and mixing
- Nik Kozub - Mastering
