= Gary Leib =

American cartoonist and animator (1955–2021)

- Born: October 29, 1955 Chicago, Illinois, United States
- Died: March 19, 2021 (aged 65) New York City, New York
- Areas: Cartoonist; illustrator; animator; musician
- Notable works: Rubber Rodeo; Idiotland; Twinkle

Gary David Leib (October 29, 1955 – March 19, 2021) was an American underground cartoonist, animator, and musician. Best known for the comic book Idiotland (a two-man anthology produced with Leib's long-time collaborator, Doug Allen), Leib's work also appeared in The New Yorker, The New York Times, Musician Magazine, The New York Observer, RAW, BLAB! and as weekly features in New York Press for many years. His animation work was featured in films like American Ultra, American Splendor, and Happiness. Leib was a founding member of the Grammy Award-nominated band Rubber Rodeo, which recorded two albums for Mercury Records. He created original music for independent and feature films, including the critically acclaimed Ironweed.

== Biography ==
Leib was born in Chicago, Illinois, the eldest of four children, and grew up in Lincolnwood. His influences growing up included EC Comics, MAD, and Zap Comix. He went to Niles North High School and the Rhode Island School of Design (RISD), graduating in 1977.

Leib was a founding member of Rubber Rodeo in 1980 with RISD friends Doug Allen, Bob Holmes, Barc Holmes, and Trish Milliken. Leib played keyboards.

Leib and Allen's Idiotland, which ran for seven issues in 1993–1994, was nominated for a 1994 Harvey Award for Best New Series. In addition to Idiotland, Leib and Allen collaborated on a number of stories in the fund-raising anthology comic Legal Action Comics volume 1, published in 2001. Leib also contributed to David Greenberger's Duplex Planet Illustrated and the 1995 award-winning comic jam, The Narrative Corpse.

Leib created his animation studio Twinkle in 1993; Twinkle has produced animation and titles for film, TV series, music videos, and websites. From 1993 until his death, Leib created a series of short animations, accompanied by jazz, about New York City, which were hosted on the New York Times website, a network ID for MTV, and a documentary for PBS. He created the animated sequences in the film American Splendor, often working in collaboration with his old partner Doug Allen. (American Splendor won the Grand Jury Prize for Dramatic Film at the 2003 Sundance Film Festival.) Leib made the animated end closing credits for the film American Ultra.

Leib also designed a popular line of promotional toys for The Hershey Company.

Leib taught in the graduate computer animation program at the School of Visual Arts and the Parsons School of Design in Manhattan. He was the 2016–2017 artist-in-residence at Fairmont State University.

Former Rubber Rodeo bandmates Leib and Bob Holmes performed in a new music project named SUSS, which has been referred to as "ambient country" music. SUSS released three albums, the most recent in December 2020.

Leib died of a heart attack on March 19, 2021, aged 65. He was survived by his wife, the painter Judy Glantzman, their daughter Lila, and his three siblings Beth, Alan, and Joel.

== Bibliography ==
- The Art of Cartooning with FLASH (with Daniel Gray and John Kuramoto) (Sybex, 2001) ISBN 0-7821-2913-7
