= Honey Bucket (musical group) =

- Origin: Portland, Oregon, Oregon, U.S.
- Genres: Garage rock; indie rock
- Years active: 2012–present
- Labels: Burger Records; Gnar Tapes; See My Friends Records
- Website: honey-bucket.bandcamp.com

Honey Bucket is an American indie rock trio from Portland, Oregon, formed in 2012. The band consists of Matt Radosevich (guitar, vocals), Vince Skelly (bass, vocals) and Jon Grothman (drums). They have released 5 albums and 1 EP.

== History ==
Honey Bucket began releasing music in 2013 with a short-run self-titled cassette on Burger Records. In 2016, Honey Bucket signed with See My Friends Records and released the album Magical World. The album brought wider attention to the band and Spin Magazine called Magical World their "most fully realized endeavor yet." The lead single of the album, titled "Devo Hat," was premiered by Brooklyn Vegan. Following the release of Magical World, Honey Bucket toured the United States, performing in more than 20 cities across the country. The tour included two back-to-back concerts in New York City, including a performance at Mercury Lounge sponsored by Maintenance Records.

Honey Bucket has been recognized for openly discussing their musical influences, listing artists such as Television Personalities, the Clean, the Fall, Half Japanese, Devo, Alan Vega, and Richard Hell.

== Discography ==
Albums

- Honey Bucket (2013) - Burger Records
- Futon (2014) - Gnar Tapes
- Plays the Classics (2015) - self released
- Magical World (2016) - See My Friends Records
- Patch of Grass (2017) - See My Friends Records
- Furniture Days (2018) - See My Friends Records

EPs

- Honey Bucket Sings (2015) - Metal Postcard
