= It's a New Day Tonight =

Studio album by Michael Rault
- Released: May 18, 2018
- Length: 35:29
- Label: Daptone

Michael Rault chronology
Living Daylight (2015)	It's a New Day Tonight (2018)

It's a New Day Tonight is the second studio album by Canadian musician Michael Rault. It was released on May 18, 2018, under Daptone Records.

== Critical reception ==
Professional ratings
Aggregate scores
Source	Rating
Metacritic	77/100
Review scores
Source	Rating
AllMusic	4/5 stars
Exclaim!	7/10
Loud and Quiet	4/10
Now	3/5 Ns
Paste	7.3/10
The Skinny	4/5 stars

It's a New Day Tonight was met with generally favorable reviews from critics. At Metacritic, which assigns a weighted average rating out of 100 to reviews from mainstream publications, this release received an average score of 77, based on 8 reviews.

== Accolades ==
Accolades for It's a New Day Tonight
Publication	Accolade	Rank	Ref.
Digital Trends	Best Albums of 2018	5	
Drift	Top 100 Albums of 2018	76	

== Track listing ==
No.	Title	Length
1.	"I'll Be There"	3:29
2.	"New Day Tonight"	2:57
3.	"Sleep with Me"	3:07
4.	"Oh, Clever Boy"	3:11
5.	"Sitting Still"	3:06
6.	"Dream Song"	2:51
7.	"Pyramid Scheme"	2:45
8.	"Out of the Light"	3:45
9.	"Sleeping & Smiling"	3:12
10.	"When the Sun Shines"	7:04
