= Dark Tea =

American music project

- Origin: Brooklyn, New York, United States
- Genres: Indie rock, indie folk, americana, lo-fi
- Years active: 2016–present
- Members: Gary Canino
- Website: http://darktea.bandcamp.com

Dark Tea is an American, Brooklyn-based music project, founded in 2016 by singer-songwriter Gary Canino. Dark Tea has released four full-length albums and an EP.

== History ==
Before founding Dark Tea in 2016, Gary Canino performed in the Brooklyn-based quartet Rips. In 2017, Dark Tea released the full-length self-titled album Dark Tea, as well as a digital single entitled Bright Flame. Dark Tea's debut album was partially mixed by Jarvis Taveniere of the band Woods, and it was mastered by Mikey Young of the band Total Control. The album's lead single "Providence Sky" was premiered by CoupDeMain Magazine, and the music video was premiered by Impose Magazine. "Providence Sky" featured guest vocals from Portland-based singer-songwriter Alexandra Savior. Dark Tea has shared stages with artists such as Michael Rault, Dougie Poole, New Love Crowd, and Ed Askew.

In 2018, The Fader premiered Dark Tea's forthcoming release "Angel of Night". Dark Tea's music has been identified as lo-fi, indie rock, freak folk, and country-psych.

In 2020, Dark Tea was acquired by Super Jumbo.

On April 16, 2021, Canino released his second self-titled LP, Dark Tea, which featured the enigmatic songwriter backed by an assortment of acclaimed producers and over 20 session musicians. The LP was co-executive produced by guitarist Noah Kohll. Videos were released for singles "Down for the Law", "Highway Mile", "Deanna", and "Finally on Time" in what some have dubbed the Dark Tea Cinematic Universe.

That same year, Canino co-directed several projects for Nick Rattigan's Current Joys, including the concert film The Phantom of the Highland Park Ebell.

== Discography ==
Albums

- Dark Tea (2019)
- Dark Tea (2021)
- Dark Tea (2022)
- Tea Sides (2024)

Singles and EPs

- Dark Tea - EP (2017)
- "Bright Flame" (2017)
- "The Old Country Road Waltz" (2018)
- "Down for the Law" (2020)
- "Highway Mile" (2021)
- "Deanna" (2021)
- "Finally on Time" (2021)
- "Highway Mile (The Return)" (2021)
- "Buying a Gun" (2021)
- "Academy Award" (2021)
- "Silent Sister" (2021)
- "Day by Day" (2023)
- "Irish Hello" (2023)
- "Motionless Memory" (2023)
- "J.T. Carrington's" (2023)
