= Scenic Views =

Studio album by Rubber Rodeo
- Released: November 15, 1984
- Genres: New wave, alternative country, cowboy pop
- Length: 40:50
- Label: Mercury Records/Polygram
- Producer: Hugh Jones

Rubber Rodeo chronology
Rubber Rodeo E.P. (1982)	Scenic Views (1984)	Heartbreak Highway (1986)

Scenic Views is the debut studio album by Rhode Island new wave band Rubber Rodeo. It was released on November 15, 1984 by Mercury Records.

== Background ==
After releasing several singles and EPs on Eat Records, Rubber Rodeo released their debut studio album in November 1984. Working with British new wave producer Hugh Jones, the album featured a range of musical instruments including mandolin, violin, synthesizer, organ, dobro, and pedal steel guitar.

The popularity of Scenic Views partially benefited from the marketing efforts of Polygram. In a 1984 interview published in Billboard, PolyGram Music Video vice president Len Epand stated that the company was "shifting its gears" and beginning to "emphasize marketing over production." Later in the interview, Epand cited Scenic Views as an example of an album that "reaped huge benefits from a seemingly small-scale video release... which produced a Grammy nomination for an almost unknown group". The Grammy that Rubber Rodeo received a nomination for was the long-form video they made for Scenic Views. The video was directed by David Greenberg and produced by Second Story Television.

The album cover features the Cabazon Dinosaurs.

== Reception ==
In Rolling Stone, Kurt Loder wrote that "Scenic Views isn't a bad record, but given Rubber Rodeo's multifaceted resources, the next album ought to be a lot better." J. D. Considine wrote that "Rubber Rodeo may play mutant, post-wave C&W-pop, but it's still rooted in the country's plainspoken bedrock of yearning and heartache." Considine coined the term cowboy pop in the same review, which was published in Musician Magazine.

== Track listing ==
1. "Need You, Need Me" (4:39)
2. "Slow Me Down" (3:31)
3. "Anywhere With You" (4:40)
4. "Walking After Midnight" (3:56)
5. "City of God" (5:13)
6. "The Hardest Thing" (3:15)
7. "House of Pain" (4:45)
8. "Mess o' Me" (5:03)
9. "Before I Go Away (5:57)
10. "Woman of Straw" (4:20)*

== Personnel ==
Per the liner notes.

- John Doelp – bass
- Barc Holmes – drums
- Bob Holmes – guitar, mandolin, violin, vocals
- Gary Leib – synthesizer,
- Trish Milliken – organ, piano, vocals
- Mark Tomeo – dobro, pedal steel guitar
