= Doug Allen (cartoonist) =

American cartoonist (born 1956)

- Born: February 22, 1956 (age 70)
- Areas: Cartoonist, Illustrator, Musician
- Notable works: Steven; Idiotland

Doug Allen (born February 22, 1956) is an American underground cartoonist, illustrator, and musician. Best known for his long-running comic strip Steven, Allen has over the years collaborated with long-time friend Gary Leib on music, animation, fine art, and comics, including the two-man Fantagraphics anthology Idiotland.

== Work ==
After attending Brown University for a time, Allen graduated from the Rhode Island School of Design (RISD) 1978 with an illustration degree. He met Gary Leib at RISD.

In addition to the weekly feature Steven, which ran in college and alternative newspapers from 1977 to 1994, Allen's comics, gag cartoons, and illustrations have appeared in The New Yorker, BLAB!, Zero Zero, Weirdo, Pictopia, and Duplex Planet Illustrated. In addition to Idiotland, Allen and Leib collaborated on a number of stories in the fund-raising anthology comic Legal Action Comics volume 1, published in 2001.

Allen's non-comics work includes Plexiglas paintings based on pinball machine art, most of which he produced in the late 1970s; and a more recent series of "fake" marine art paintings, which he sells on his website.

Along with Leib, Allen was a founding member of the Grammy-nominated band Rubber Rodeo from 1978 to 1982. Allen has played bass for many other bands as well.

Allen and his wife and two children live in Rockland County, New York.

== Awards ==
- Harvey Award nominee 1994
  - Best New Series (Idiotland)
  - Best Syndicated Strip (Steven)

== Bibliography ==
- Steven (8 issues, Kitchen Sink Press, 1989–1996); followed by The Best of "Steven" (Kitchen Sink Press, 1998)
- Idiotland (7 issues, Fantagraphics, 1993–1994)
