= Dougie Poole =

American singer-songwriter

- Origin: Brooklyn, New York
- Genres: Country music; outlaw country; indie rock; cowboy pop; experimental pop
- Instruments: Vocals, guitar, synthesizer
- Years active: 2016–present
- Website: https://www.dougiepoole.com/

Dougie Poole is a singer-songwriter from Brooklyn, New York now based in Los Angeles, California.

== History ==
Dougie Poole's music has been described as an "intersection of experimental pop and outlaw country." He released his debut EP Olneyville System Special in 2016.

In 2017, Poole released his debut full-length album Wideass Highway. In a review of the album, Cameron Perry wrote that Poole "twists classic country into something strange and authentic." The Morning News included Wideass Highway in their list of The Top Albums of 2017. Dougie Poole's 2017 song "Don't You Think I'm Funny Anymore" was included in The Fader's list of under-appreciated songs from 2017. Dougie Poole has shared stages with Jerry Paper, Sean Nicholas Savage, Dark Tea, New Love Crowd, and Drugdealer amongst others.

Poole's sophomore album The Freelancer's Blues was released in June 2020. His third album The Rainbow Wheel of Death was released in February 2023. A live album, At Tubby's, was released in July 2025.

== Discography ==
=== Studio albums ===
- Wideass Highway (2017)
- The Freelancer's Blues (2020)
- The Rainbow Wheel of Death (2023)

=== Live albums ===
- At Tubby's (2025)

=== Singles and EPs ===
- Olneyville System Special (2016)
