= Rock Camp (TV series) =

2004 Canadian reality television series

- Genre: Reality
- Directed by: John Marshall
- Starring: Joel Plaskett; Ian McGettigan; Doug Hoyer; Sam King; Ryan Cheung; Jason Polman; Krystal Gibbon; Karina Pry
- Country of origin: Canada
- Original language: English
- No. of seasons: 1
- No. of episodes: 13

Production
- Executive producer: Suzanne Chapman
- Producer: John Marshall / Allison Outhit

Original release
- Network: CBC
- Release: 5 April 2004 – 2004

Rock Camp is a 13-episode Canadian reality television series that aired on CBC in 2004. Episodes featured 18 young people training to become rock musicians, as filmed in Halifax, Nova Scotia. The series was first broadcast 5 April 2004.
