= Idiotland =

Comic book by Doug Allen and Gary Leib

Publication information
- Publisher: Fantagraphics
- Schedule: quarterly
- Format: standard
- Publication date: Mar. 1993 – Dec. 1994
- No. of issues: 7
- Main character(s): Margarita Schnapps, Lavender Sachet, Milkshake Gravy, Morties

Creative team
- Written by: Doug Allen and Gary Leib
- Artist(s): Doug Allen and Gary Leib

Idiotland is a surrealistic comic book by Doug Allen and Gary Leib published by Fantagraphics in 1993–1994. It is noticeably more surreal and Dada-like than Allen's more famous work, the Steven comic strip and its compilations.

Idiotland was low on plot and high on bizarre characters of unusual anatomy and memorable names, such as Margarita Schnapps and Lavender Sachet, a pair of mean-spirited, middle-aged shopaholics in anthropomorphic animal form, or Milkshake Gravy, a nosy, unattractive, cross-dressing mailman. It also includes the serialized, three-part story, "Morties", about a small community overtaken by parasitic, mind-controlling fish, called Morties, which bubble up from the brain and burst through the skull. After "Morties" concluded, a new serial began in issue #4, called "Lunch Money". Both stories starred the creators Allen and Leib portrayed as children.

Idiotland was nominated for a 1994 Harvey Award for Best New Series. It ran for seven issues.
