= Cowboy pop =

Subgenre of pop music

- Stylistic origins: Soft rock; western; experimental pop; psychedelia; countrypolitan; outlaw country; country pop; country; folk pop; pop
- Cultural origins: 1970s and 1980s in Nashville, Tennessee
- Typical instruments: Pedal steel guitar; keyboard; guitar; synthesizer; bass guitar; drum kit; dobro; organ

Other topics
- Alternative country

Cowboy pop is a music genre coined in 1984 by music journalist J. D. Considine in his review of Scenic Views by Rubber Rodeo. Usage of the term has varied. In the late 2010s, the term began to be used to describe country-influenced indie rock and indie pop bands.

== History ==
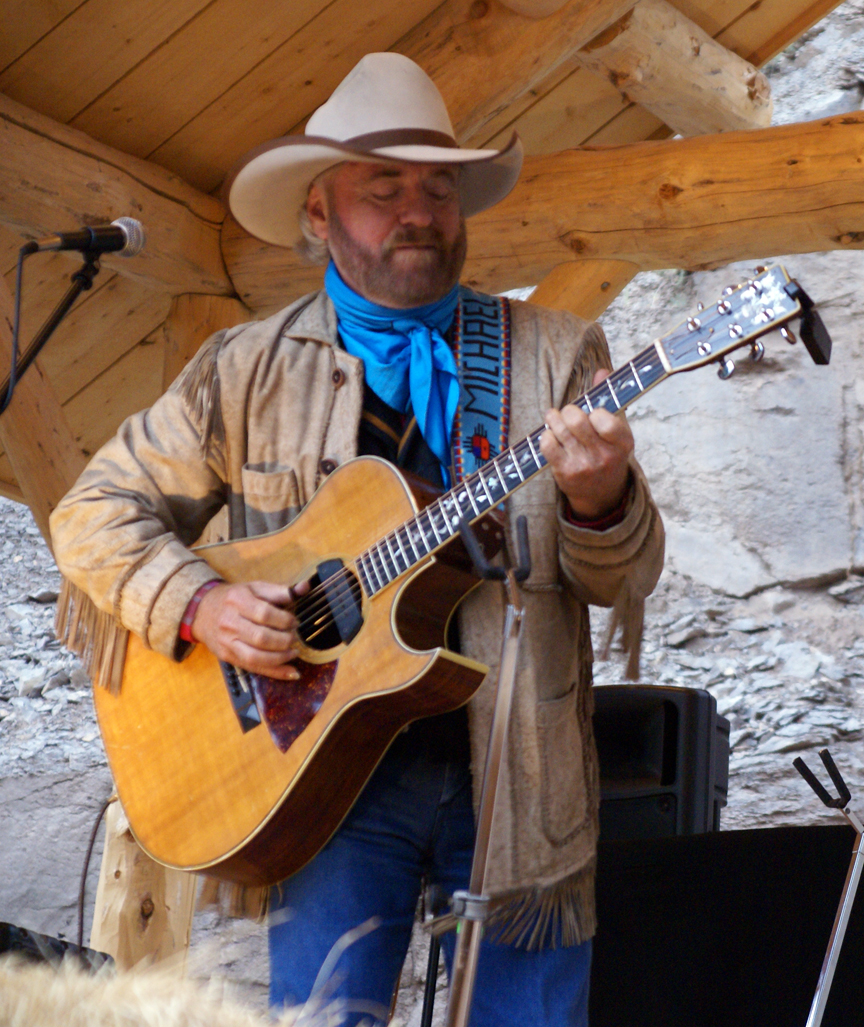
The music of Michael Martin Murphey has been referred to as cowboy pop

=== Pop ballads in western films ===
Following Considine's coining of the term "cowboy pop" in the 1980s, the term was used retrospectively to describe a broad range of music recorded throughout the 20th century. In the early 2000s, music journalists such as Barry Mazor, John T. Davis, and Richard Carlin began to describe pop ballads used in western films as cowboy pop. Barry Mazor called Jimmy Wakely a "cowboy pop singer" and argued that "when singing cowboy movies ruled, Hollywood hardly made a distinction between the sounds of cowboy pop balladeers and another sound entirely, born in Texas, in which Jimmie Rodgers had a formative role." As an actor and cowboy pop balladeer, Wakely sang in many of the western films in which he appeared, such as Riders of the Dawn and Silver Trails. Similarly, John T. Davis called Marty Robbins a "cowboy pop balladeer," who would later act and provide music for western films such as Gun of a Stranger. Marty Robbins' 1959 song "El Paso" was featured on Cowboy Pop, a 2011 compilation released by Ling Music Group. Similar to Jimmy Wakely and Marty Robbins, Wilf Carter's 1949 recording "Bluebird on Your Windowsill" was described by Richard Carlin as "the kind of cowboy pop that is treasured as a kitsch classic." Wilf Carter's songs were also used to score cowboy films, such as John Ford's 1939 Stagecoach. Though these popular cowboy singers preceded the coining of the term cowboy pop by music journalist J. D. Considine, they have been identified in retrospect for their singing of pop ballads in the context of western films.

=== Soft rock of the 1970s and 1980s ===
Beyond the early pop balladry of cowboy singers like Jimmy Wakely, Marty Robbins, and Wilf Carter, the term cowboy pop has also been used to describe soft rock performers from the 1970s and 1980s who embodied cowboy aesthetics in their music, such as Michael Martin Murphey and Alex Harvey. Stereo Review referred to Michael Martin Murphey as a cowboy pop singer and JazzTimes similarly referred to Alex Harvey's 1971 song "Rings" as cowboy pop. In December 1974, soft rock singer Paul Davis released the song "Ride 'Em Cowboy," which peaked at #4 on Billboard's Pop-Standard Singles and #27 on the Hot 100. In the context of baroque pop music, Van Dyke Parks employed cowboy aesthetics in his 1989 song "Cowboy," which The Wire described as "a complex narrative about Hawaii and the Japanese attack on Pearl Harbour." Parks went on to produce Utah Carol's "Cowboy Pop Song" in 2001.

== 2010s ==
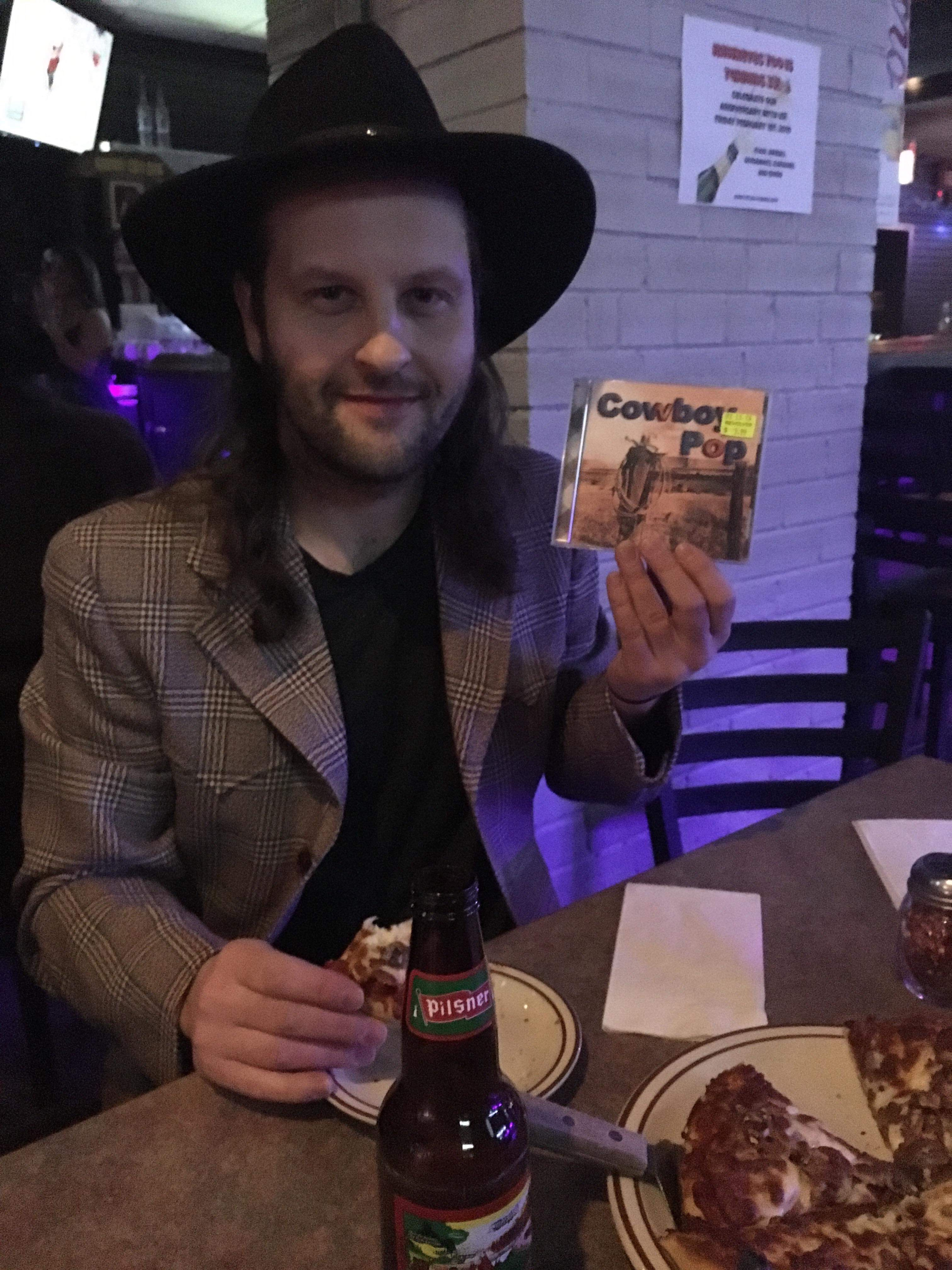
A music fan displays a cowboy pop CD at a music festival

In the late 2010s, the term cowboy pop began to be used to describe several country-influenced indie rock and indie pop bands in New York City. Some associated groups include Babies' Babies, Baby Jey, Cut Worms, Dark Tea, Dougie Poole, New Love Crowd, Sam Evian, Widowspeak, and Wilder Maker, several of whom have performed together. In 2015, Stereogum described Wilder Maker's music as "cowboy pop that’s got one eye wandering toward outlaw territory and one fixed on catchy melodies." The influence of outlaw country was similarly noted by New Commute, which described Dougie Poole's music as an "intersection of experimental pop and outlaw country." London in Stereo called Widowspeak's 2017 release Expect the Best an "accomplished album that would fit snugly in a cowboy pop genre." In a 2018 interview, Baby Jey cited influences such as Prince and 1980s country singers Tanya Tucker, Keith Whitley, and Johnny Lee, giving further context to the development of contemporary cowboy pop.

As of 2018, the music blog aggregator Hype Machine employs the term cowboy pop as a music genre.
