= Christian Hansen & the Autistics =

Canadian rock band

Christian Hansen
- Origin: Edmonton, Alberta, Canada
- Genres: New wave
- Years active: 2007–present
- Members: Christian Hansen; Molly Flood
- Past members: Scott Shpeley; Ava Jane Markus
- Website: christianhansenband.com

Christian Hansen (formerly Christian Hansen & the Autistics) is a Canadian new wave band from Edmonton, Alberta, formed in late 2007 and consisting of Christian Hansen and Molly Flood.

== History ==
=== Early years ===
In 2006, Christian Hansen, who moved from Vancouver to Edmonton in 2001, released the solo record The Super Awkward Album. A year later, with his fiancée, Molly Flood, and another couple, Scott Shpeley and Ava Jane Markus, they began performing as Christian Hansen and the Autistics.

=== Power Leopard ===
In March 2009, the group was awarded a $10,000 development grant for Edmonton artists from Rawlco Radio and used it to record their first full-length album, Power Leopard, released the same year. It gained recognition with the singles "Cocaine Trade" and "Pump It", which were put into rotation on Edmonton's Sonic 102.9 and XM Satellite Radio. "Cocaine Trade" was named Song of the Year by the Edmonton Journal, and the album was included in the honourable mention list for the 2010 Polaris Music Prize. The band released a four-song EP, Swans, on June 4, 2010.

=== Relocation and second album ===
Hansen and Flood, married since 2009, relocated to Toronto in 2011. In 2012, they officially shortened their name to just Christian Hansen. In October 2012, the group released their second full-length album, C'mon Arizona. That year also saw the addition of live musicians Dustin Hawthorne (formerly of Hot Hot Heat) on bass and Al Boyle (of You Say Party) on drums.

== Name controversy ==
The band's name has been a controversial topic, though the group has claimed that rather than mocking it, they are paying homage to autism and the people affected by it.

== Band members ==
Current

- Christian Hansen – vocals, guitar
- Molly Flood – keyboards, vocals

Past

- Scott Shpeley – bass
- Ava Jane Markus – keyboards

Touring musicians

- Doug Organ – drums
- Doug Hoyer – bass
- Dustin Hawthorne – bass
- Al Boyle – drums

== Discography ==
Studio albums

- Power Leopard (2009)
- C'mon Arizona (2012)

EPs

- Power Leopard (2008)
- Swans (2010)
- Small Fry (2014)
