= New Love Crowd =

- Origin: Brooklyn, New York and Birmingham, Alabama
- Genres: Indie rock, cowboy pop, psychedelic pop
- Years active: 2014-present
- Label: Maintenance Records

New Love Crowd is a Brooklyn-based music project founded in 2014 by singer-songwriter Travis Swinford. New Love Crowd has released one full-length album, one EP, and two singles.

== History ==
Before founding New Love Crowd, Travis Swinford was active in several other musical projects, including the band Plains. Although originally from Birmingham, Alabama, New Love Crowd is currently based in New York City. New Love Crowd's debut self-titled EP was released by Happenin Records and premiered by Impose Magazine.

In 2017, New Love Crowd was featured in Alt Citizen following a performance with Larry Sass and Champagne Supperchillin. New Love Crowd has shared stages with Paul Bergmann, Dougie Poole, Dark Tea, and Baby Jey, amongst others.

In January 2019, New Love Crowd released "Cotton Candy" on Maintenance Records.

== Discography ==
=== Albums ===
- The Demos (2017)

=== Singles and EPs ===
- The New Love Crowd EP (2014)
- Country Boy (2018)
- Cotton Candy (2019)
