= The Palisade (Colorado) =

Coordinates: 38.6889088°N 108.9564112°W

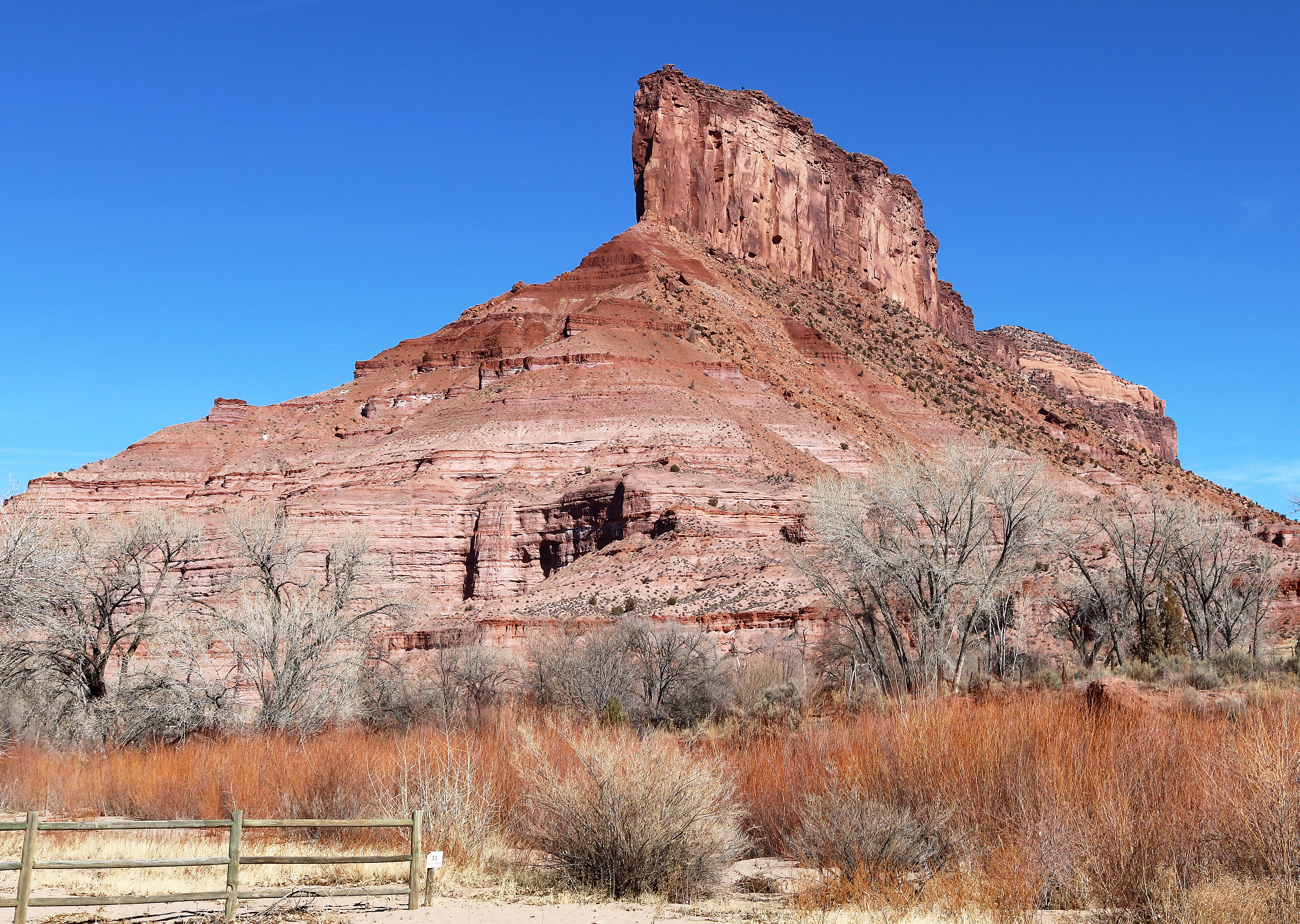
The Palisade

The Palisade is a three-mile (4.9-km) long butte in Mesa County, Colorado, located slightly north of the town of Gateway. Its elevation is 6,591 feet (2,009 meters). It is the most prominent geologic feature in both the eponymously named The Palisade Area of Critical Environmental Concern and The Palisade Wilderness Study Area. The region is a diverse area spanning vertical cliffs, mesas, deep rugged canyons and flat desert valley bottoms. The area is protected for peregrine falcon and golden eagle breeding areas as well as Gunnison sage-grouse habitat. It is also managed for the preservation of sensitive plant species.
