= The Duplex Planet =

Zine published by David Greenberger

- Cover of issue #126 of The Duplex Planet, published in 1993.
- Managing Editor: Barbara Price
- Categories: zine
- Frequency: monthly
- Format: digest
- Founder: David Greenberger
- Founded: 1979
- First issue: 1979; 47 years ago
- Country: United States
- Based in: Saratoga Springs, New York
- Language: English
- Website: DuplexPlanet.com
- ISSN: 0882-2549

The Duplex Planet is a zine edited and published by David Greenberger since 1979. It contains transcriptions of his interviews with elderly residents of senior centers and "meal sites" in the Massachusetts area. For many years, the zine focused on the residents of the Duplex Nursing Home, located in Boston.

The Duplex Planet has subsequently found larger audiences in other forms — which are all derived from the original template — including book collections, spoken-word recordings, and a series of concerts. A series of personal commentaries drawn from Greenberger's experiences with this body of work has aired regularly on National Public Radio's All Things Considered.

Some of the Duplex Nursing Home residents, all identified by name, became recurring characters in the zine and its various offshoots and adaptations.

== Background ==
In 1979, having just completed a degree in fine arts as a painter, Greenberger took a job as activities director at the Duplex Nursing Home. On his first day, he met the residents of the nursing home and abandoned painting in favor of conversation. "This is my art," he said. "It's personal for me." In this unexpected setting, Greenberger found an unusual medium and a desire to portray the people he met as living human beings instead of "just repositories of their memories or the wisdom of the ages." Instead of collecting oral history about significant events, Greenberger focused on talking one-on-one with ordinary people about ordinary things — the joy of a close shave or answers to questions like "Can you fight city hall?" By his 31st issue, Greenberger was printing 400 copies a run and mailing them all over the country.

== Recurring "characters" ==
Many of the elderly people interviewed in Duplex Planet appeared regularly in the pages of the zine, and collaborated directly with Greenberger. They include:

- Bern & Edwina
- Ernest Noyes Brookings
- Ken Eglin
- Arthur Wallace
- Herbert Caldwell

== Adaptations ==
=== Music and theater ===
A series of CDs titled Lyrics by Ernest Noyes Brookings (1989–present) continues to be issued, featuring a wide variety of notable musical acts (XTC, Brave Combo, Morphine, Ben Vaughn, Peter Holsapple, The Young Fresh Fellows, Robyn Hitchcock, Dave Alvin, Yo La Tengo and over a hundred others) performing songs set to the poems of Duplex Planet regular Brookings.

1001 Real Apes (2006), a theatrical presentation, features monologues drawn from the pages of The Duplex Planet, with music composed and performed by the critically acclaimed instrumental ensemble Birdsongs of the Mesozoic.

=== Visual arts ===
==== Comics ====
Duplex Planet Illustrated

Publication information
- Publisher: Fantagraphics Books
- Schedule: bimonthly (approximately)
- Format: standard
- Genre: alternative comics
- Publication date: Jan. 1993 – Apr. 1996
- No. of issues: 15
- Main character: Residents of Duplex Nursing Home

Creative team
- Created by: David Greenberger
- Written by: David Greenberger
- Artist(s): Doug Allen, Gary Leib, Rick Altergott, Terry LaBan, Peter Bagge, J. R. Williams, Archer Prewitt, Drew Friedman, Dan Clowes, Jim Woodring, Chris Ware, Dame Darcy, James Kochalka, Jason Lutes, Joe Zabel, Gary Dumm, Ellen Forney, Peter Kuper, Roberta Gregory, Tim Hensley, Dave Cooper, Sam Henderson, Andy Hartzell, Ron Regé, Dean Haspiel, Josh Neufeld, Eric Reynolds, David Collier, Jessica Abel, Matt Madden, David Lasky, Pete Sickman-Garner, Darryl Vance, Wayno, Dean Rohrer, Pat Moriarity, Mike Schafer, Matthew Guest
- Editor: David Greenberger

Collected editions
- No More Shaves: A Duplex Planet Collection: ISBN 1560972572

Cartoonist Dan Clowes illustrated material from Duplex Planet in some early issues of his comic book Eightball and issues can be seen being put out for sale in the “Zine-O-Phobia” store in Ghost World (2001) based on Clowes’ work of the same name.

Shortly thereafter, Clowes' publisher Fantagraphics Books began publishing Duplex Planet Illustrated, a comic book featuring adaptations of Duplex Planet material drawn by a variety of alternative comics artists, including Peter Bagge, Drew Friedman, Dan Clowes, Jim Woodring, Chris Ware, and James Kochalka. Duplex Planet Illustrated ran for 15 issues, from 1993 to 1995.

Selections from the comic were published in a trade paperback, No More Shaves: A Duplex Planet Collection (ISBN 1560972572), in 2003.

==== Exhibits ====
"An Exact Spectacular", an exhibit of drawings and sculptures by some of the magazine's subjects, beginning in 1994, has traveled to museums and colleges.

=== Radio ===
From 1996 to 2009, a series of personal commentaries drawn from Greenberger's experiences aired regularly on National Public Radio's All Things Considered.

"The Duplex Planet Radio Hour," with music composed by NRBQ's Terry Adams, was presented in 1994 at St. Ann's Warehouse and recorded for New York Public Radio.
