= Gateway, Colorado =

Unincorporated community in Mesa County, CO, USA

- Unincorporated community
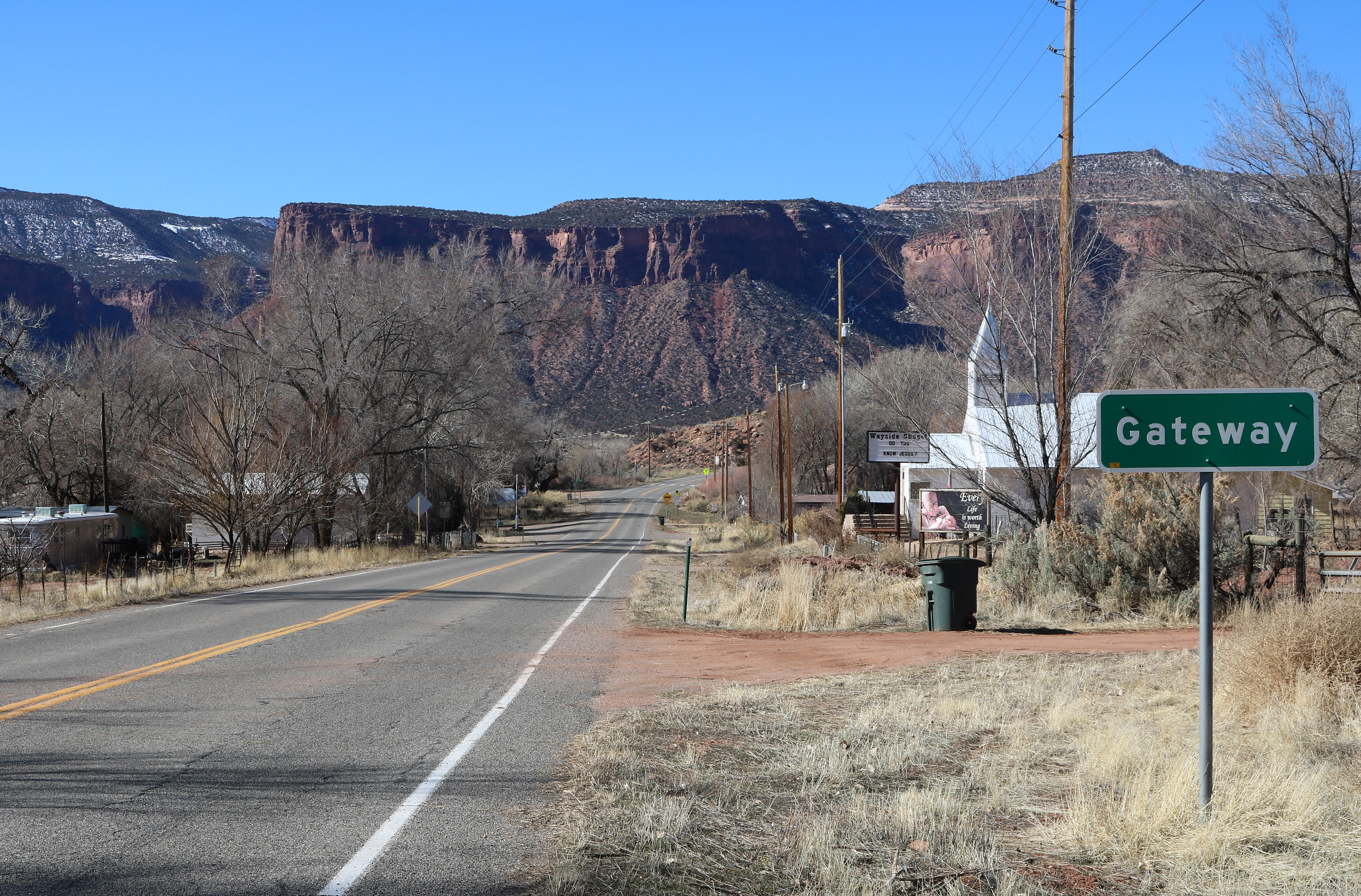
- Entering from the east on State Highway 141
- Interactive map of Gateway, Colorado
- Coordinates: 38°40′57″N 108°58′30″W
- Country: United States
- State: Colorado
- Counties: Mesa
- Elevation: 4,616 ft (1,407 m)
- Time zone: UTC-7 (MST)
  - Summer (DST): UTC-6 (MDT)
- ZIP code: 81522
- Area code: 970
- GNIS feature ID: 185409

Gateway is an unincorporated community and a U.S. Post Office located in Mesa County, Colorado, United States.

== Description ==
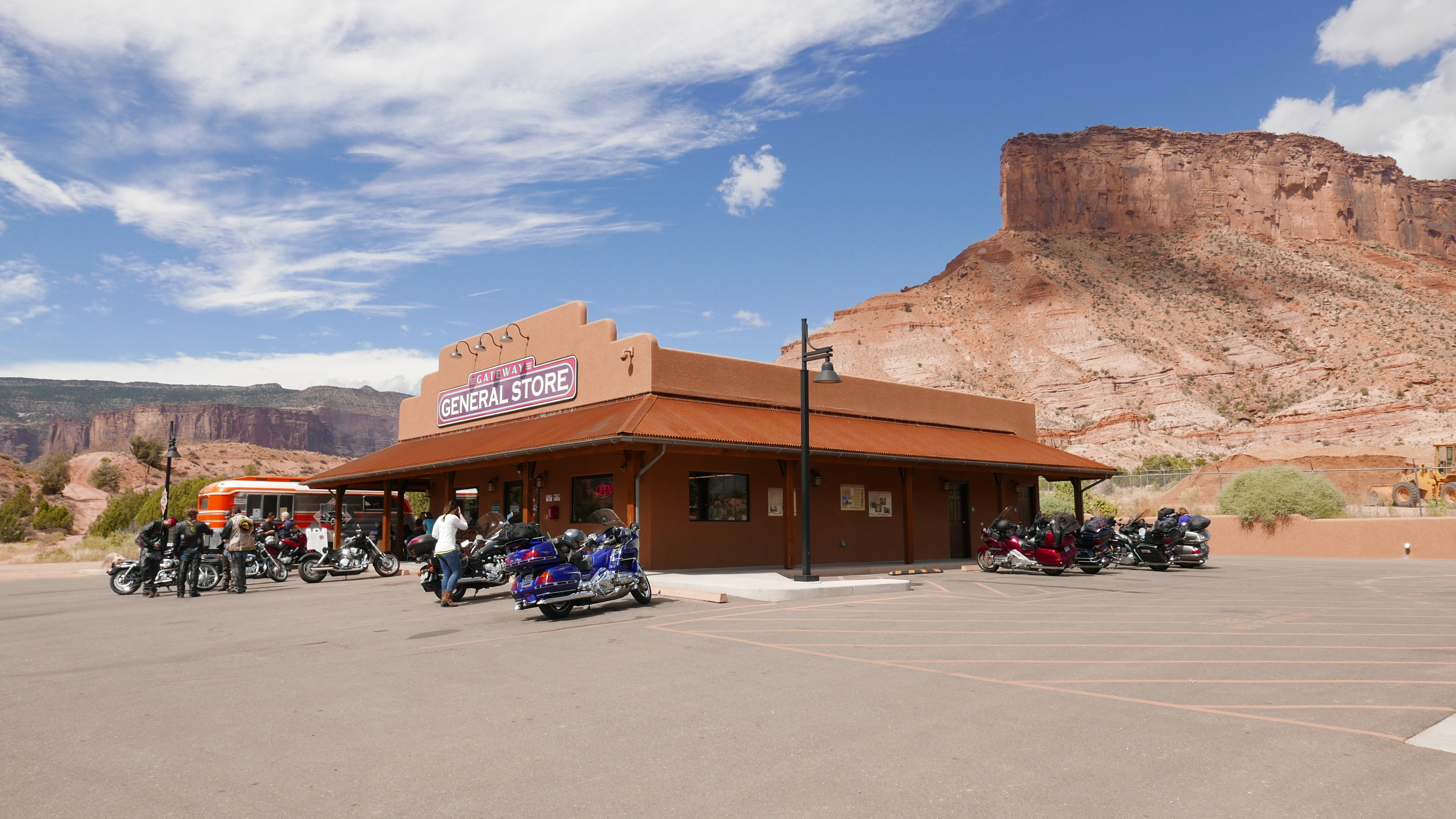
The Gateway General Store as seen from the parking lot.

The Gateway Post Office has the ZIP Code 81522. A post office called Gateway has been in operation since 1903. Gateway is thought to be named after the nearby Gateway Canyon, which features a distinctive pillar rock formation at its entrance. Alternatively, some suggest that Gateway serves as the natural entry point to the neighboring regions to the south, west, and north.

== Geography ==
=== Climate ===
According to the Köppen Climate Classification system, Gateway has a cold semi-arid climate, abbreviated "BSk" on climate maps. The hottest temperature recorded in Gateway was 106 °F (41.1 °C) on August 12, 1958, July 12, 1959, July 13, 1971, and July 9–10, 2021, while the coldest temperature recorded was −28 °F (−33.3 °C) on January 13, 1963.

Climate data for Gateway, Colorado, 1991–2020 normals, extremes 1956–present
Month	Jan	Feb	Mar	Apr	May	Jun	Jul	Aug	Sep	Oct	Nov	Dec	Year
Record high °F (°C)	67 (19)	73 (23)	86 (30)	92 (33)	99 (37)	105 (41)	106 (41)	106 (41)	103 (39)	91 (33)	79 (26)	70 (21)	106 (41)
Mean maximum °F (°C)	54.9 (12.7)	63.5 (17.5)	75.2 (24.0)	83.0 (28.3)	91.0 (32.8)	98.6 (37.0)	101.7 (38.7)	97.7 (36.5)	93.2 (34.0)	82.3 (27.9)	69.5 (20.8)	57.4 (14.1)	101.9 (38.8)
Mean daily maximum °F (°C)	44.9 (7.2)	52.0 (11.1)	63.0 (17.2)	70.5 (21.4)	79.8 (26.6)	90.7 (32.6)	95.4 (35.2)	92.1 (33.4)	84.6 (29.2)	71.4 (21.9)	57.1 (13.9)	44.7 (7.1)	70.5 (21.4)
Daily mean °F (°C)	33.1 (0.6)	39.5 (4.2)	48.5 (9.2)	55.4 (13.0)	64.0 (17.8)	73.7 (23.2)	79.5 (26.4)	77.0 (25.0)	68.9 (20.5)	56.3 (13.5)	43.8 (6.6)	33.5 (0.8)	56.1 (13.4)
Mean daily minimum °F (°C)	21.4 (−5.9)	27.0 (−2.8)	34.0 (1.1)	40.4 (4.7)	48.2 (9.0)	56.7 (13.7)	63.7 (17.6)	61.8 (16.6)	53.1 (11.7)	41.3 (5.2)	30.4 (−0.9)	22.2 (−5.4)	41.7 (5.4)
Mean minimum °F (°C)	7.2 (−13.8)	13.1 (−10.5)	20.3 (−6.5)	26.9 (−2.8)	34.1 (1.2)	44.0 (6.7)	53.5 (11.9)	52.6 (11.4)	40.0 (4.4)	26.2 (−3.2)	15.5 (−9.2)	7.3 (−13.7)	4.0 (−15.6)
Record low °F (°C)	−28 (−33)	−9 (−23)	2 (−17)	15 (−9)	24 (−4)	34 (1)	45 (7)	38 (3)	25 (−4)	11 (−12)	−3 (−19)	−11 (−24)	−28 (−33)
Average precipitation inches (mm)	0.71 (18)	0.69 (18)	1.00 (25)	1.13 (29)	1.05 (27)	0.50 (13)	1.21 (31)	1.26 (32)	1.45 (37)	1.22 (31)	0.83 (21)	0.75 (19)	11.80 (300)
Average snowfall inches (cm)	3.5 (8.9)	1.9 (4.8)	1.0 (2.5)	0.5 (1.3)	0.0 (0.0)	0.0 (0.0)	0.0 (0.0)	0.0 (0.0)	0.0 (0.0)	0.1 (0.25)	1.1 (2.8)	3.1 (7.9)	11.2 (28.45)
Average precipitation days (≥ 0.01 in)	5.6	5.5	5.9	5.9	5.7	3.3	5.8	6.7	5.8	5.6	4.3	5.0	65.1
Average snowy days (≥ 0.1 in)	2.4	1.3	0.6	0.2	0.0	0.0	0.0	0.0	0.0	0.1	0.8	2.8	8.2
Source 1: NOAA
Source 2: National Weather Service

== Arts and culture ==
Gateway is home to the Gateway Canyons Resort & Spa. Established by Discovery Channel founder John S. Hendricks. Guests may enjoy UTV tours, horseback riding, hiking, mountain biking, specialty spa treatments, and more at the Gateway Canyons Resort & Spa. To the north lies the Palisade, a three-mile (4.8-km) long butte.
