= The Palisades (Green River, Wyoming) =

Coordinates: 41°33′09″N 109°29′27″W

Green River Palisades
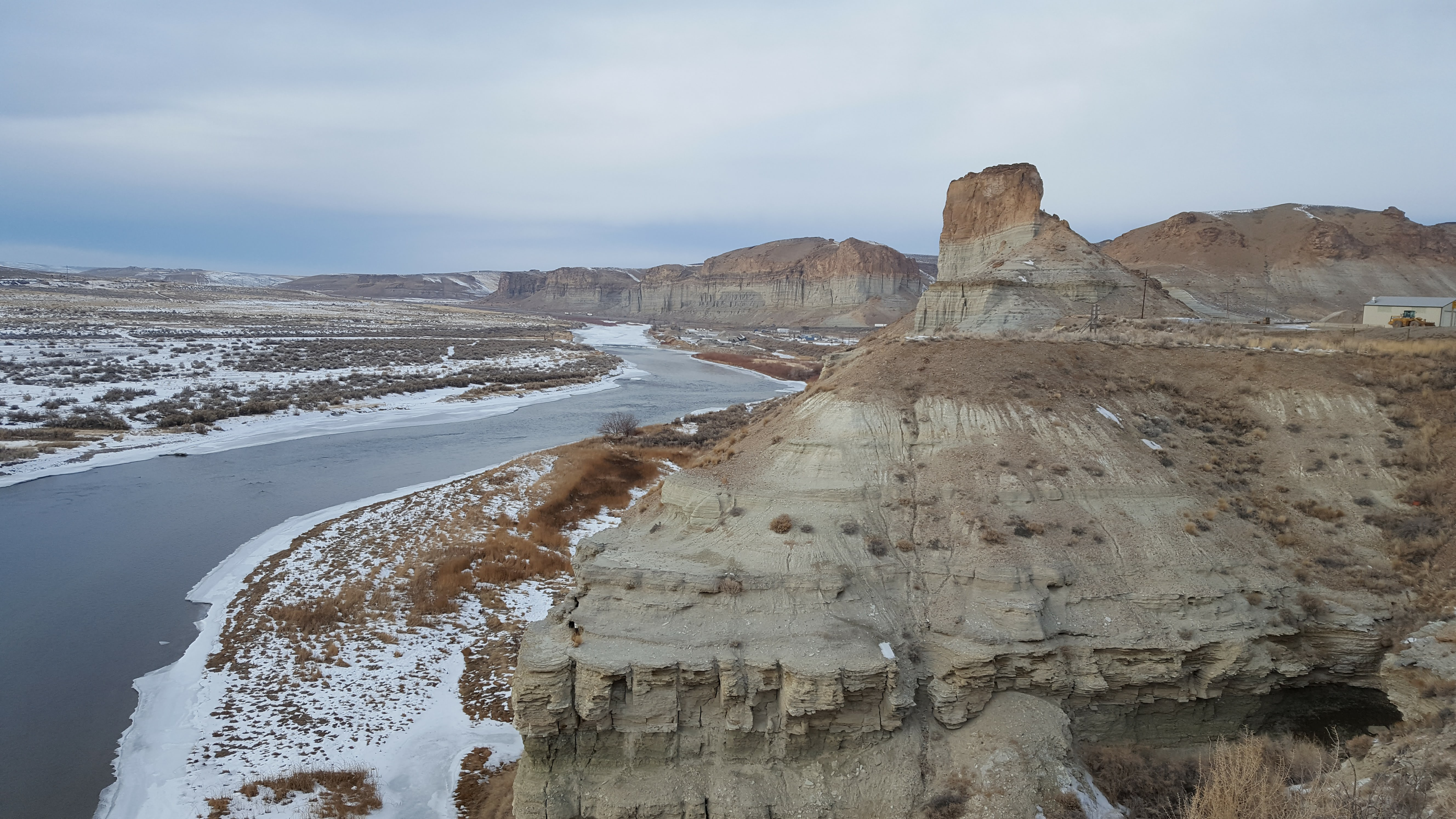
- The vertical cliffs of the Green River Palisades west of Green River, Wyoming.

Geography
- Location: Sweetwater County, Wyoming, U.S.
- Parent range: Green River Basin

Geology
- Mountain type: Cliffs / Escarpment
- Rock type: Green River Formation

The Green River Palisades (known locally as the Palisades) are a series of striking, vertically jointed cliffs located along the Green River, just west of the city of Green River in Sweetwater County, Wyoming. They are among the most photographed geological features in the state and serve as a classic exposure of the Eocene-aged Green River Formation.

== Geology ==
The Palisades are primarily composed of the Tipton Shale Member and the Laney Member of the Green River Formation. The "palisaded" appearance—resembling a defensive wall of stakes is the result of vertical jointing in the massive sandstone and marlstone layers.

Tipton Shale Member: This forms the lower portion of the cliffs. It consists of oil shale and paper shale deposited in the relatively deep, freshwater stages of Lake Gosiute.

Tower Sandstone: Often visible near the top or as distinct "towers," this unit consists of cross-bedded fluvial (river) and deltaic sandstones that prograded into the lake. The resistance of this sandstone to erosion helps maintain the steep, vertical profile of the cliffs. The Palisades contain abundant Knightia alta (the state fossil of Wyoming), as well as fossilized crocodile teeth, turtle shells, and diverse plant life such as sycamore and palm leaves.

The Palisades gained national fame in the 19th century through the work of geological surveyors and artists. During the Ferdinand Vandeveer Hayden Geological Survey of 1871, the Palisades were identified as a key stratigraphic landmark for understanding the Tertiary history of the American West. The famous landscape artist Thomas Moran painted the Palisades, capturing the vibrant colors and dramatic verticality of the cliffs, which helped inspire public interest in the geology of the Green River Basin. Working alongside Moran, William Henry Jackson captured some of the earliest photographs of the Palisades, which were used to document the geological formations for the federal government.

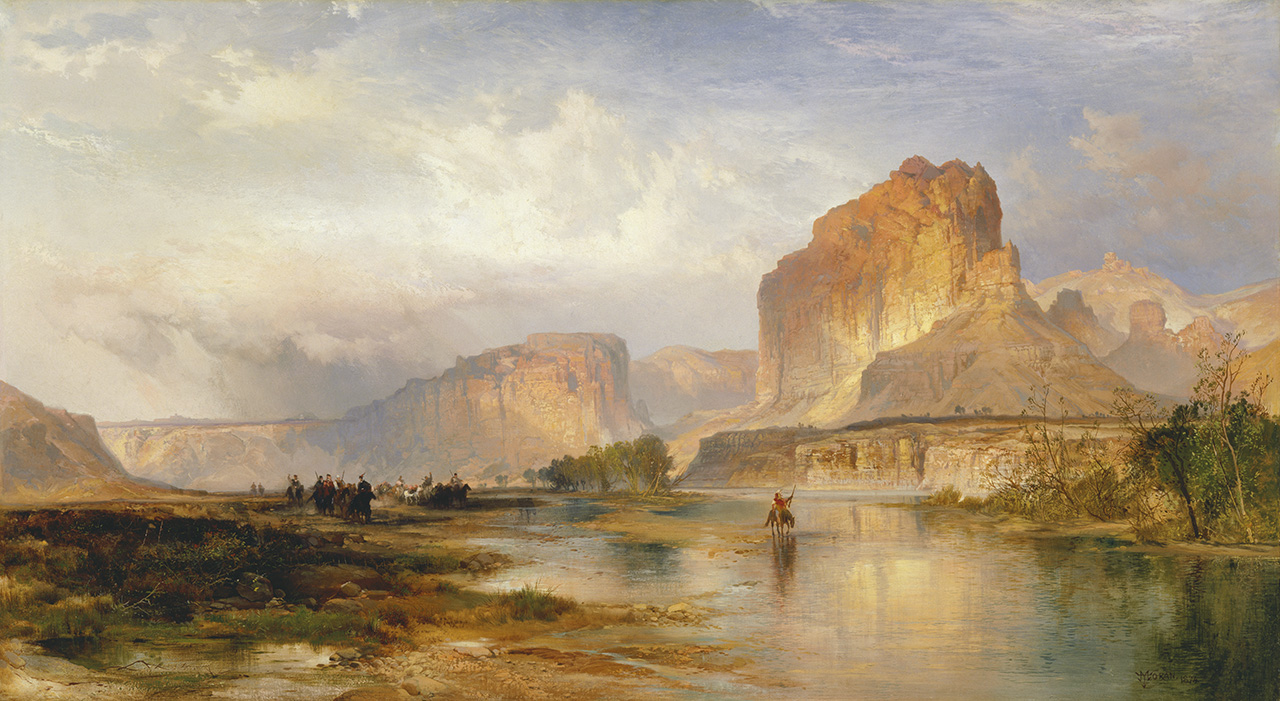
Thomas Moran's Cliffs of Green River; 1874

== Weathering and incident ==
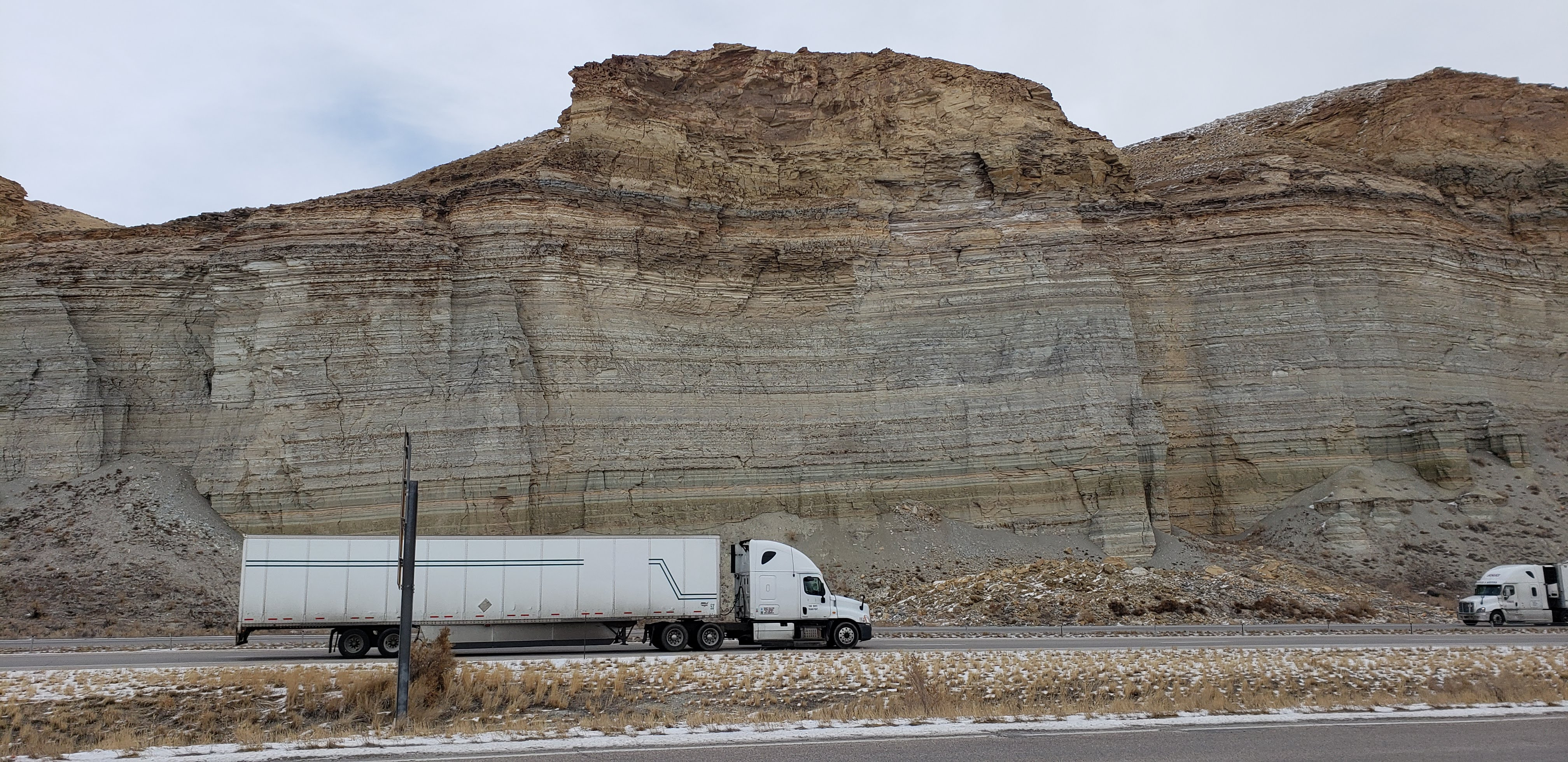
The section that collapsed as seen in 2018, eight years later

The Palisades are subject to significant mechanical weathering, primarily through a process known as frost wedging. Because the Tower Sandstone and the Laney Member possess prominent vertical joints, water enters these fractures and expands upon freezing, eventually levering large slabs of rock away from the cliff face.

On October 13, 2010, this instability resulted in a massive rockfall approximately two miles west of Green River. The debris did not reach the travel lanes of Interstate 80, but the impact created a localized dust storm that reduced visibility to near zero. This atmospheric condition caused a chain-reaction crash involving multiple vehicles, which led to the closure of the interstate for several hours.

The Wyoming Department of Transportation (WYDOT) continues to monitor the site closely. Following subsequent smaller events, including a slide in late 2023, WYDOT engineers and geologists have utilized drone surveys to map the cliff face and assess the risk of "toppling" failures, where tall columns of sandstone lean outward before collapsing.

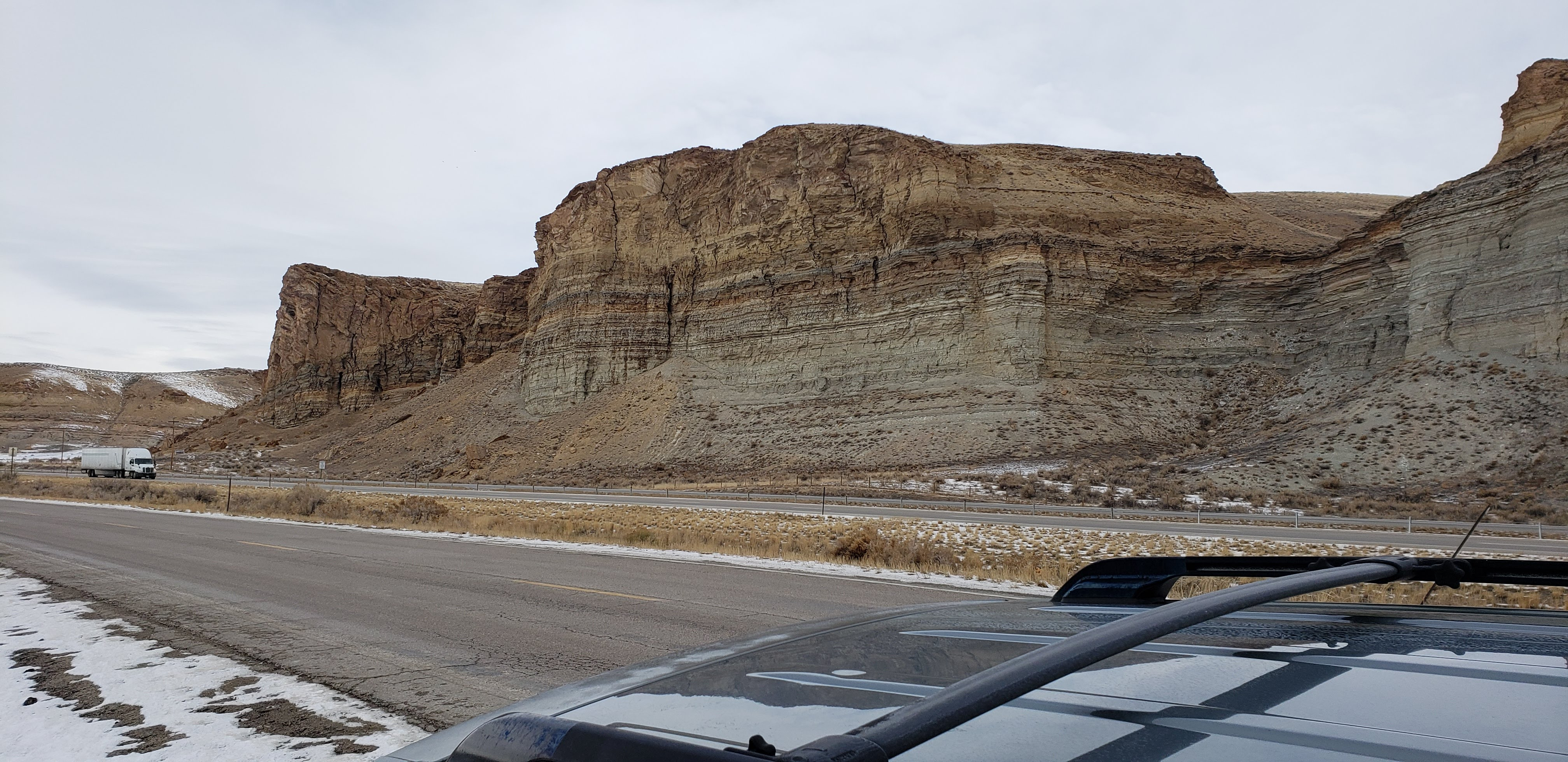
Another look at the Palisades with Interstate 80 below.
