= Palisades (music venue) =

Coordinates: 40°41′52″N 73°56′13″W

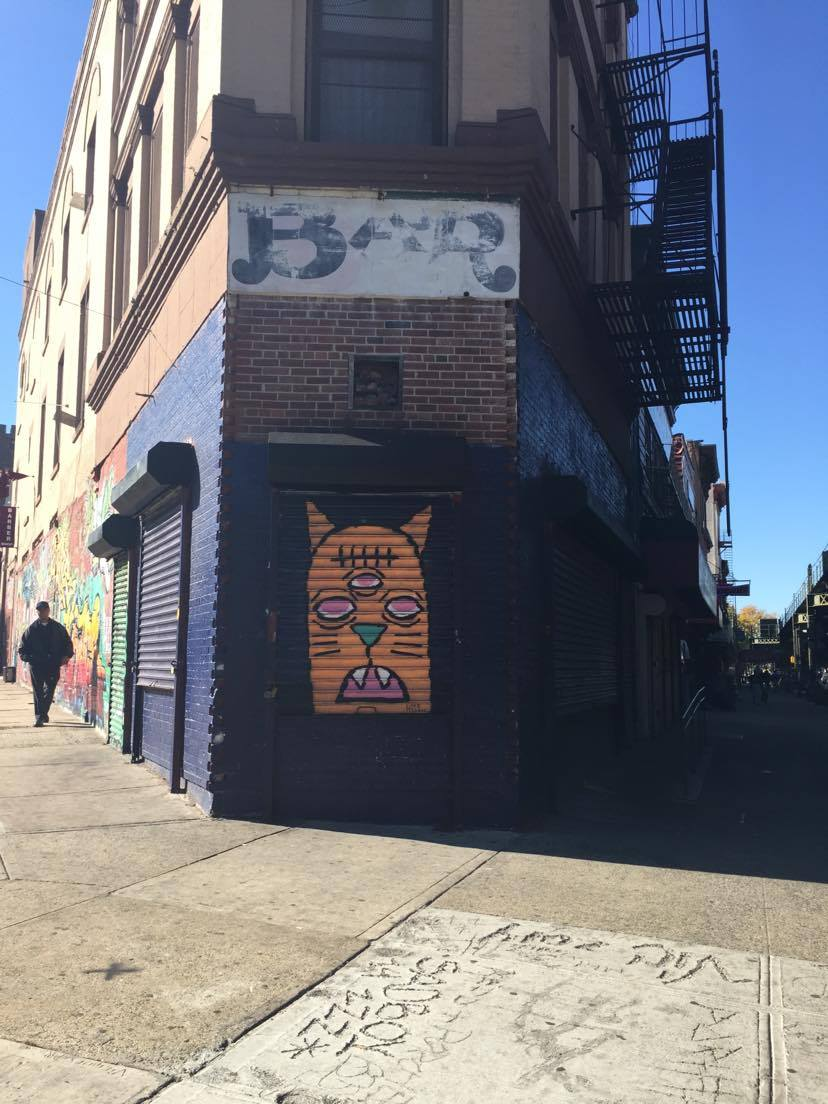
- Palisades exterior in October 2015
- Interactive map of Palisades
- Address: 906 Broadway, Brooklyn, NY 11206
- Location: Bushwick, Brooklyn
- Capacity: 300
- Type: Music venue
- Public transit: New York City Subway: at Myrtle-Broadway; NYCT Bus: B46

Construction
- Opened: 2014

Palisades was a New York City live music venue located at 906 Broadway in Bushwick, Brooklyn.

== Founding ==
Palisades was founded by Leeor Waisbrod, with Rose Fathers, and Ariel Bitran.

== Operations ==
The venue began hosting art shows in April 2014 and started hosting concerts shortly thereafter. Palisades presented hundreds of concerts between 2014 and 2016, including performances from bands such as Parquet Courts, Skepta, Xiu Xiu, Guerilla Toss, and Hinds. In its final year, Palisades presented performances by bands such as Bodega Bay and Useless Eaters.

== Closure ==
In June 2016, Palisades was shut down during Northside Festival. Reporting in The Baffler later described the shutdown as the final raid in a series of M.A.R.C.H. (Multi-Agency Response to Community Hotspots) inspections targeting the venue. An article in Gothamist explained that the venue had been shut down due to multiple building code violations. Management initially stated that the venue would only be closed "for a few days," but in August 2016 it was announced that Palisades would remain permanently closed. Several previously booked concerts were rescheduled at other Brooklyn venues such as Shea Stadium.

== In popular culture ==
Following the increased popularity of the venue, Palisades was featured on the cover of the New Yorker in April 2016.

== Gallery ==
Palisades Brooklyn
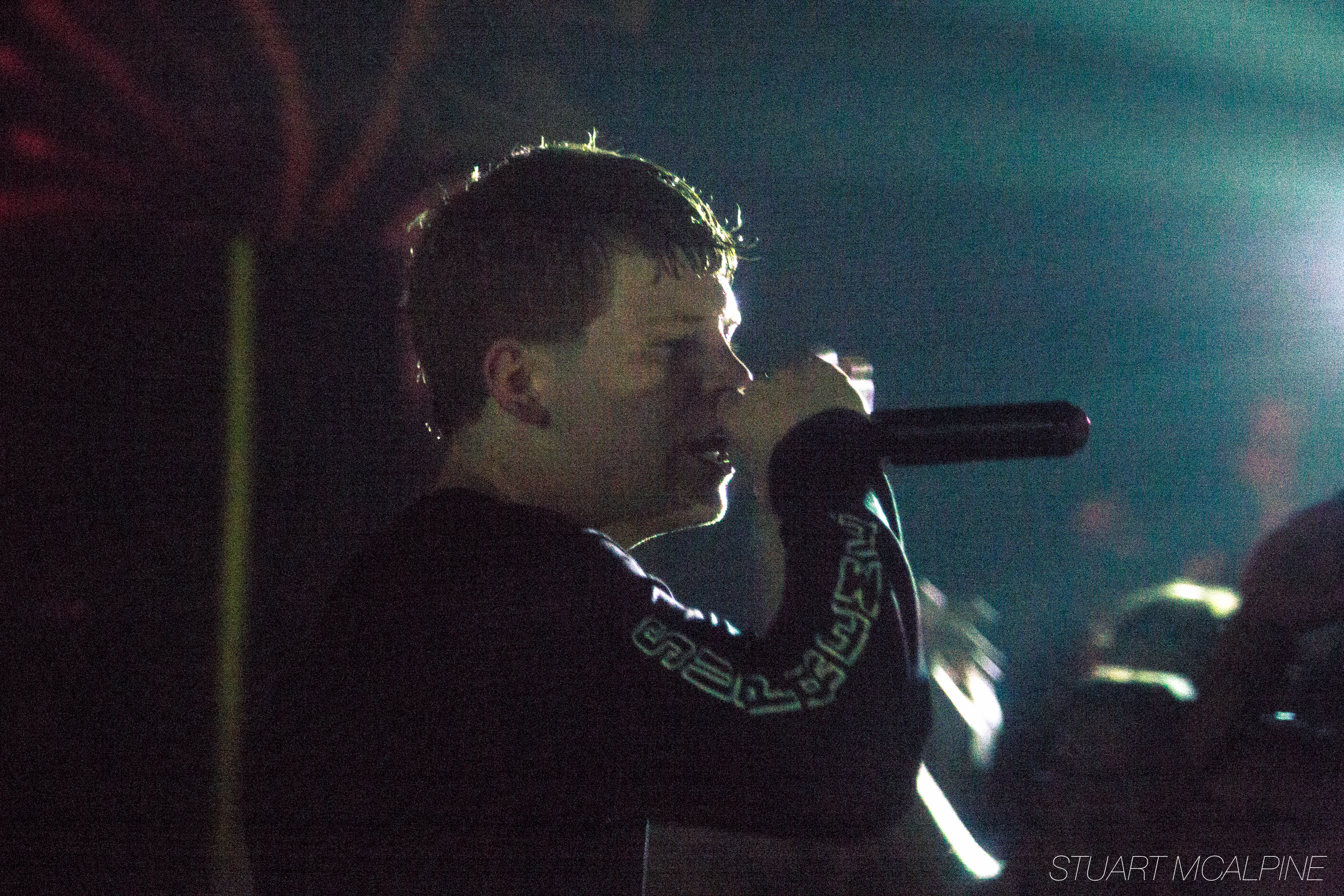
Yung Lean in 2014

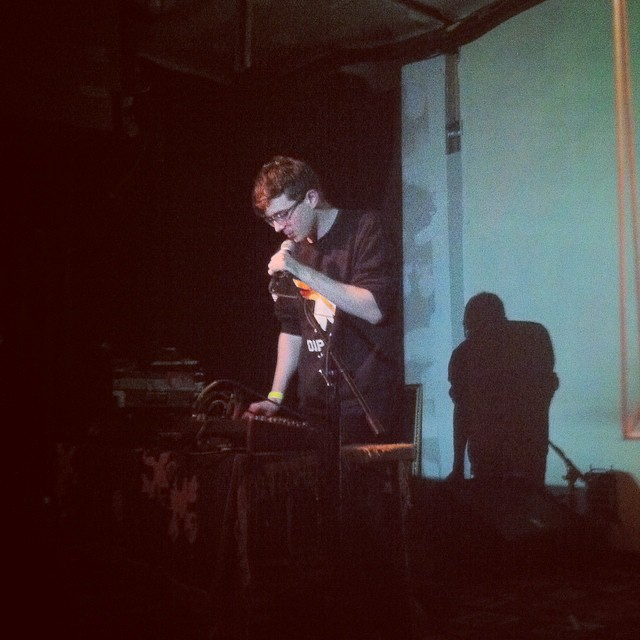
Ricky Eat Acid in 2015

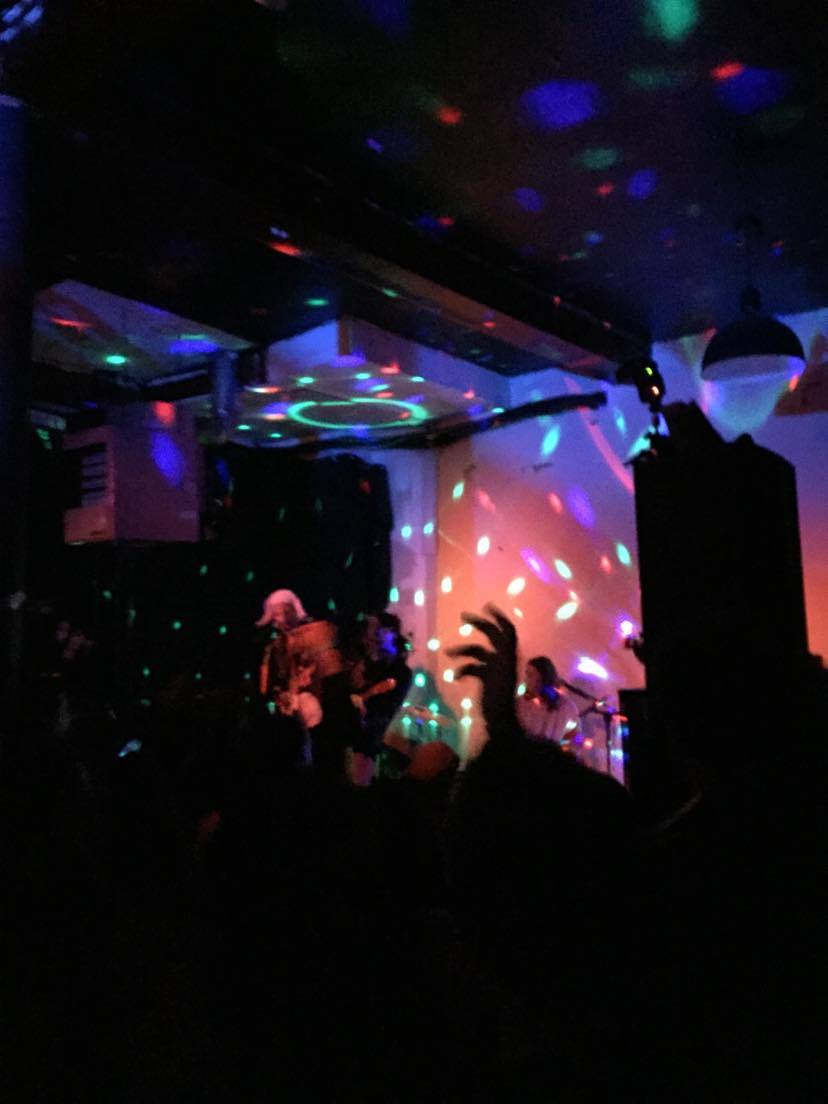
Ariel Bitran in 2015

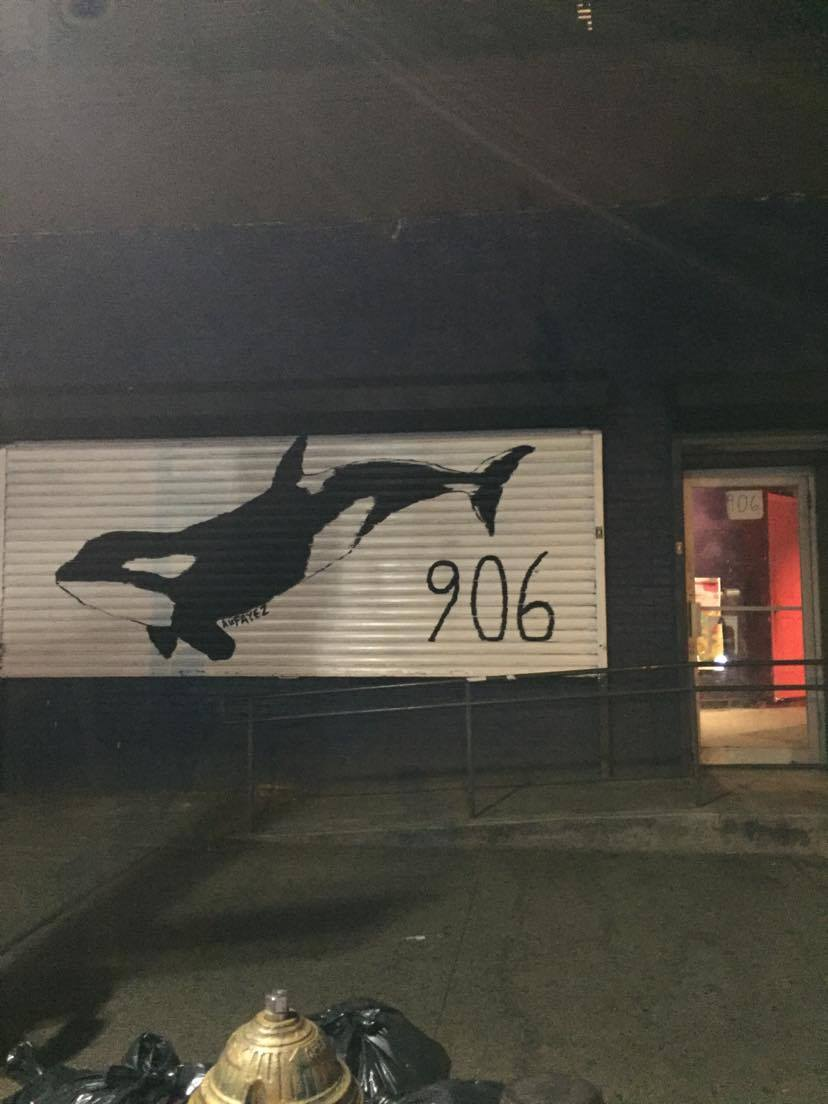
Exterior facing West

== See also ==
- Culture of Brooklyn
- Music of New York City
