= David Greenberger =

American artist, writer and radio commentator

- Born: June 26, 1954 (age 72); Chicago, U.S.
- Occupations: Artist, Writer, critic
- Writing career
- Period: 1979–present
- Genre: Non-fiction
- Subject: Aging
- Notable work: Duplex Planet
- Website: www.davidgreenberger.com

David Greenberger (born June 26, 1954) is an American artist, writer and radio commentator best known for his Duplex Planet series of zines, comic books, CDs, and spoken word performances and radio plays. From 1996 to 2009, he was a frequent contributor of essays and music reviews for National Public Radio.

== Biography ==
Greenberger grew up in northwestern Pennsylvania on the shores of Lake Erie.

In 1979, having just completed a degree in fine arts as a painter, Greenberger took a job as activities director at a nursing home in Boston. On his first day, he met the residents of the nursing home and abandoned painting in favor of conversation. "This is my art," he said. In this unexpected setting, Greenberger found an unusual medium and a desire to portray the people he met as living human beings instead of "just repositories of their memories or the wisdom of the ages." Instead of collecting oral history about significant events, Greenberger focused on talking one-on-one with ordinary people about ordinary things—the joy of a close shave or answers to "Can you fight city hall?".

Greenberger began publishing his conversations with old people in The Duplex Planet, a small, homemade magazine he started in 1979, and continued for 187 issues, concluding in 2010. It has subsequently found larger audiences in other forms, which are all derived from the original template. A series of personal commentaries drawn from Greenberger's experiences with this body of work has aired regularly on National Public Radio's "All Things Considered". Since the mid-90s he has created some 500 audio works of monologues and music with a variety of collaborators (including members of Los Lobos, NRBQ, Robyn Hitchcock, and Wreckless Eric). These have been released on some 20+ CDs. Greenberger was the subject of a segment in 2007's "Life Part 2: Language of Aging", part of a PBS series on aging and his performance of "Cherry Picking Apple Blossom Time" with an ensemble led by Paul Cebar at Milwaukee's Pabst Theater was broadcast on PBS stations. His work has been the subject of three documentaries, "Lighthearted Nation" ( dir. Jim McKay, C-hundred Film Corp, 1989), "Your Own True Self" (dir. Paul Athanas & Jay Rooney, Gravita International Films, 1992), and "A King in Milwaukee" (dir. Nicole Docta, UWM Center on Age & Community, 2009), as well as being adapted into the short film by David Kagen, "Whitewash." He gave a TEDx talk titled "A Quarter Million Forgotten Conversations" in 2010 about his recorded work.

Greenberger returned to visual art in 2006, producing several thousand drawings that have been shown and sell regularly. In 1979 he was a founding member, bass player, and lyricist of the band Men & Volts who went on to record five albums over the course of the 1980s. He is also co-writer of some 50+ songs with Chandler Travis as recorded by his various bands from 1985 onwards (The incredible Casuals, Chandler Travis Philharmonic, Catbirds).
