= The Velveteins =

Canadian indie rock band

- Origin: Edmonton, Alberta, Canada
- Genres: Indie rock, psychedelic rock
- Years active: 2014–present
- Labels: Fierce Panda UK; Fierce Panda Canada; Handwritten Records
- Members: Spencer Morphy; Addison Hiller; Dean Kheroufi; Danger Sedmak
- Website: thevelveteins.com

The Velveteins is an indie rock band from Edmonton, Alberta, Canada. The group consists of core songwriting members Spencer Morphy (guitar, singer) and Addison Hiller (percussion, singer).

== History ==
Originating as a solo project by Morphy, The Velveteins group was formed in 2014 after Morphy's extended trip in Australia, during which he "fell in love with the psychedelic music and lush beaches of Australia". The band's self-produced first effort, Fresh Claws EP, was released in 2014 and marked the first collaborative work by Morphy and Hiller. A second release, A Hot Second with the Velveteins, was produced and recorded by Lincoln Parish of Cage The Elephant in his home studio in Nashville, Tennessee. This release received critical acclaim locally and internationally. The band has played CMW in Toronto and has opened for high-profile indie acts such as Milo Greene, USS, and July Talk. In 2015, the Velveteins' released A Hot Second with The Velveteins was nominated for an Edmonton Music Award. In 2017, the band released the album Slow Wave and toured throughout Canada and the United States.

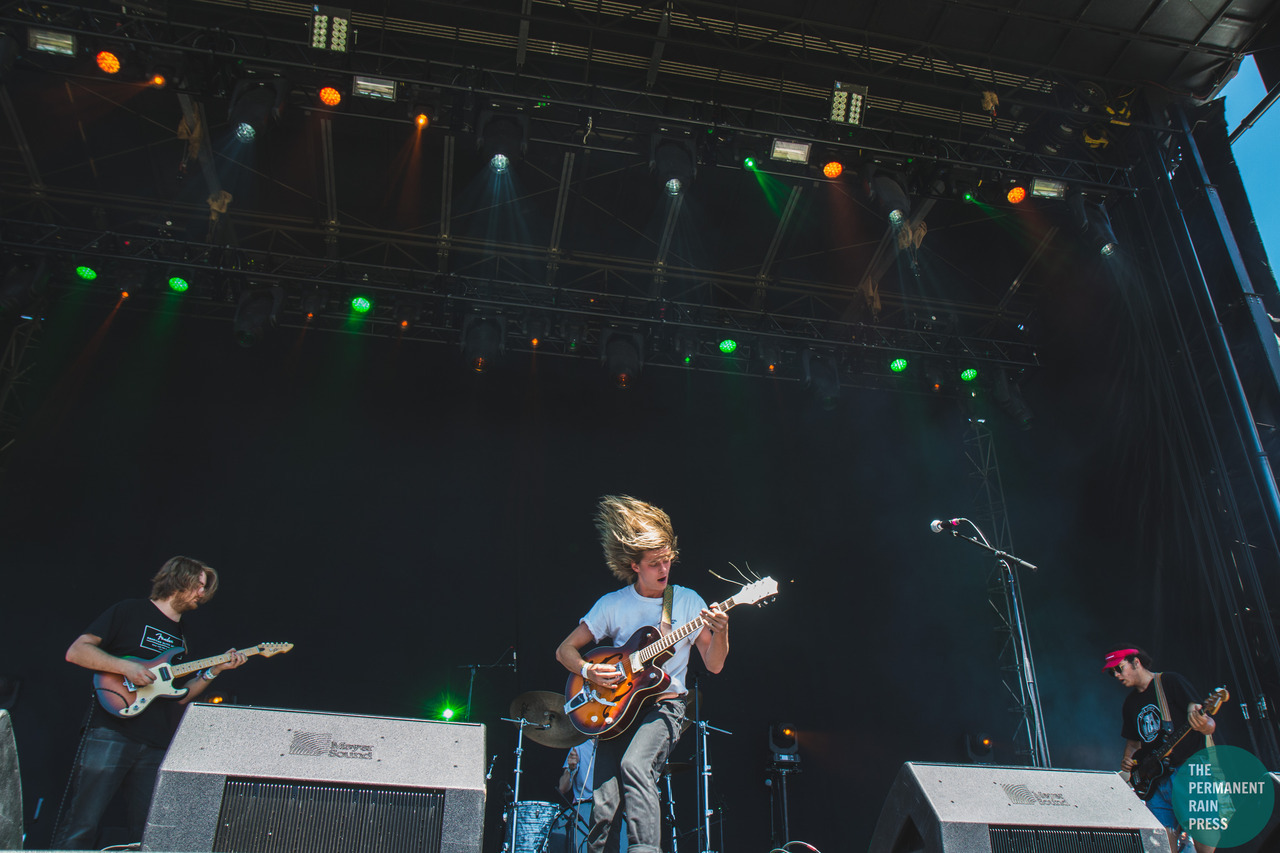
Live at Rock The Shores 2017

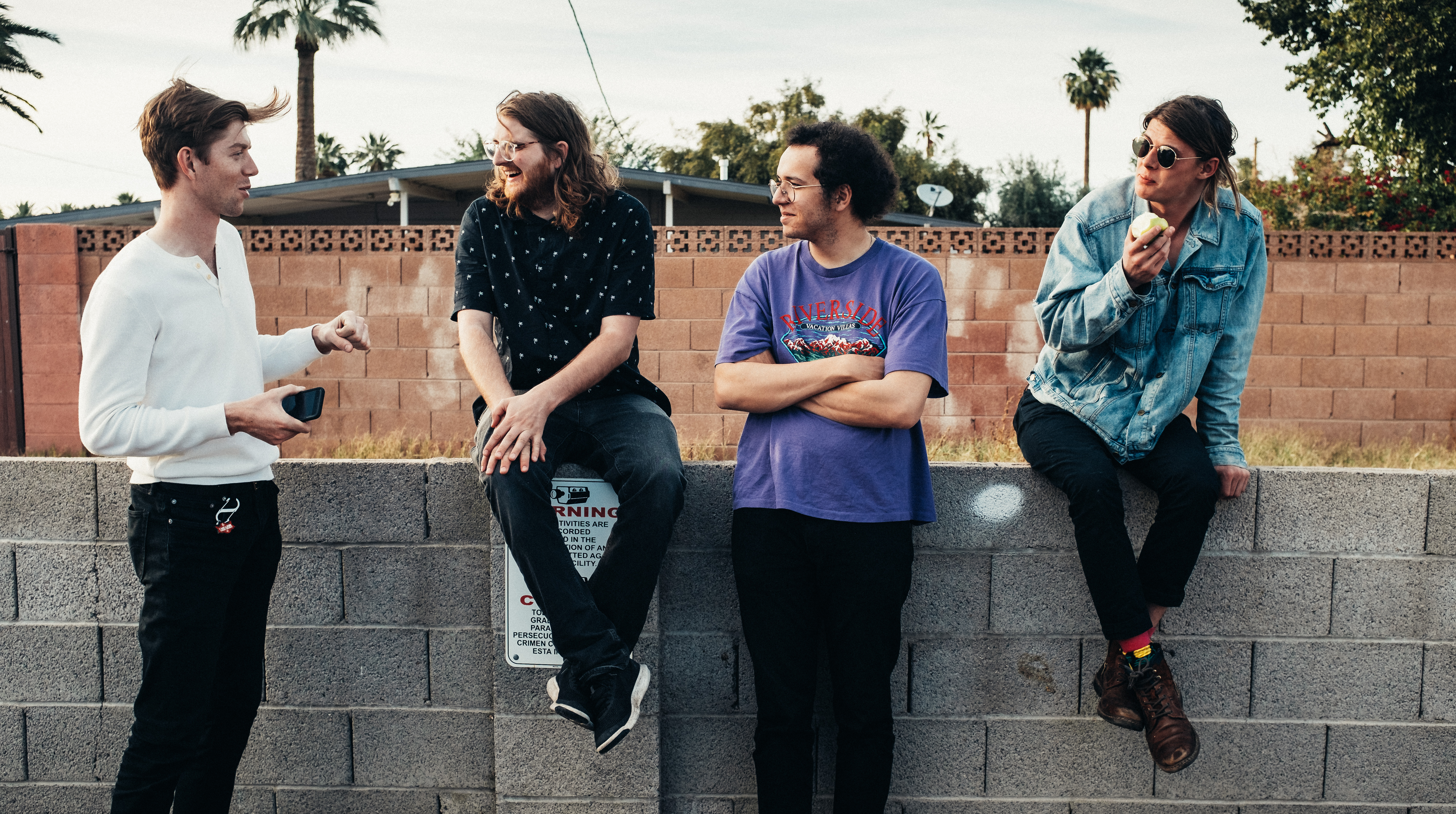
The band with added member Daniel Sedmak on a US tour 2019

== Members ==
- Spencer Morphy – vocals, guitar
- Addison Hiller – vocals, percussion
- Dean Kheroufi – bass
- Daniel (Danger) Sedmak – guitar/keys

== Discography ==
=== Albums ===
- Slow Wave (2017)
- Declarations of the 3am Freeway (2023)

=== EPs ===
- A Hot Second with the Velveteins (2015)

=== Singles ===
- Don't Yah Feel Better (2016)
- Midnight Surf (2017)
- Love in a Modern Age/Last Night (2019)
- Cosmic Saturation (2021)
- Make It Through (2021)
