= Useless Eaters =

American rock band

- Origin: San Francisco, California
- Genres: Garage rock; punk rock
- Years active: 2008–present
- Labels: Castle Face Records

Useless Eaters is an American rock band from San Francisco, formed in 2008. Useless Eaters is fronted by Seth Sutton, who is well known for performing with the late garage punk musician Jay Reatard. As of 2018, Useless Eaters have released seven albums and a number of EPs.

== History ==
Seth Sutton was originally based in Memphis before relocating to San Francisco. Useless Eaters' first EP Sucked In was released by Goner Records in 2009. The band released several singles and EPs before releasing their debut album Zulu in 2011. In 2014, Useless Eaters signed with Castle Face Records for the release of their fifth album Bleeding Moon. The album's lead single "Out In The Night" was premiered by Noisey.

In 2016, Useless Eaters released their seventh album Relaxing Death. The lead single from the album "Moist Cuts" was premiered by The Fader. Following the release of Relaxing Death, Useless Eaters toured across Europe and the United States, performing more than 30 concerts. Useless Eaters' 2016 tour included a performance at Gonerfest, the annual music festival in Memphis presented by Goner Records.

== Discography ==
Albums

- Zulu (2011)
- Daily Commute (2011)
- C'est Bon! (2012)
- Hypertension (2013)
- Bleeding Moon (2014)
- Live in San Francisco (2015)
- Relaxing Death (2016)

EPs

- Sucked In (2009)
