= Faith Healer (band) =

Canadian indie rock band

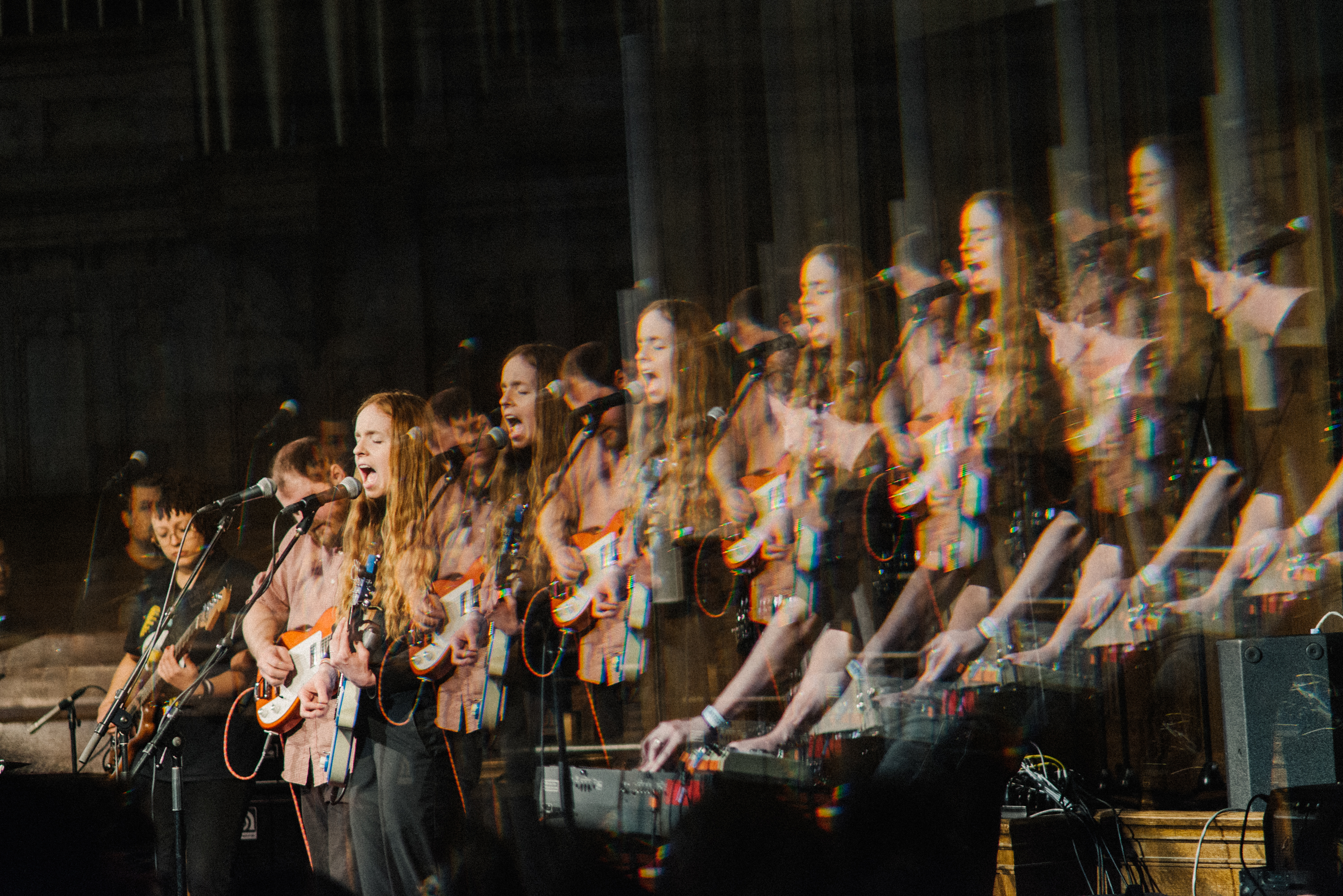

Background information
- Origin: Edmonton, Alberta
- Genres: indie rock
- Years active: 2015–present
- Label: Mint Records
- Members: Jessica Jalbert; Renny Wilson; Jenni Roberts; Mitch Holtby; Ross Faulder; Connor Donaldson

Faith Healer is a Canadian indie rock band from Edmonton, Alberta, whose core member is singer and songwriter Jessica Jalbert. Another long-time member is singer-songwriter, producer and recording engineer Renny Wilson.

== History ==
Jalbert first collaborated with Wilson on her solo debut album Brother Loyola in 2011, before deciding to adopt the band name Faith Healer as she did not want her music to be pigeonholed as singer-songwriter pop.

The band's debut album Cosmic Troubles was released March 31, 2015, on Mint Records. The album was met with positive reviews from Pitchfork and Exclaim!. Wilson played several instruments on the album and created a number of the arrangements.

Jalbert and Wilson recorded their second album, Try ;-), in Montreal. It was released in September 2017. The pair added Jenni Roberts and Mitch Holtby to create a complete band; the group performed at the 2017 Pop Montreal Festival. The album was longlisted for the 2018 Polaris Music Prize. Additional band members include Ross Faulder and Connor Donaldson.

== Discography ==
=== As Jessica Jalbert ===
==== Singles ====
- Paris Green (2011)
- Necromancy (2011)
- Lack Of A Lake (2011)

==== Album ====
- Brother Loyola (Old Ugly Recording Co, 2011)

==== Music video ====
- Paris Green - Directed by Mike Robertson (2011)

=== As Faith Healer ===
==== Singles ====
- Until The World Lets Me Go (2014)
- Again (2015)
- Universe (2015)
- Canonized (2015)
- Light Of Loving (2017)
- Sterling Silver (2017)
- Try ;-) (2017)

==== Albums ====
- Cosmic Troubles (Mint Records, 2015)
- Try ;-) (Mint Records, 2017)
- The Hand That Fits The Glove (Mint Records, 2023)

==== Music Videos ====
- Canonized - Directed by Mike Robertson (2015)
- Try ;-) - Directed by Jordan Minkoff (2017)
- & Waiting - (Homemade, 2018)
- Another Fool - Directed by Renny Wilson (2022)
