= Michael Rault =

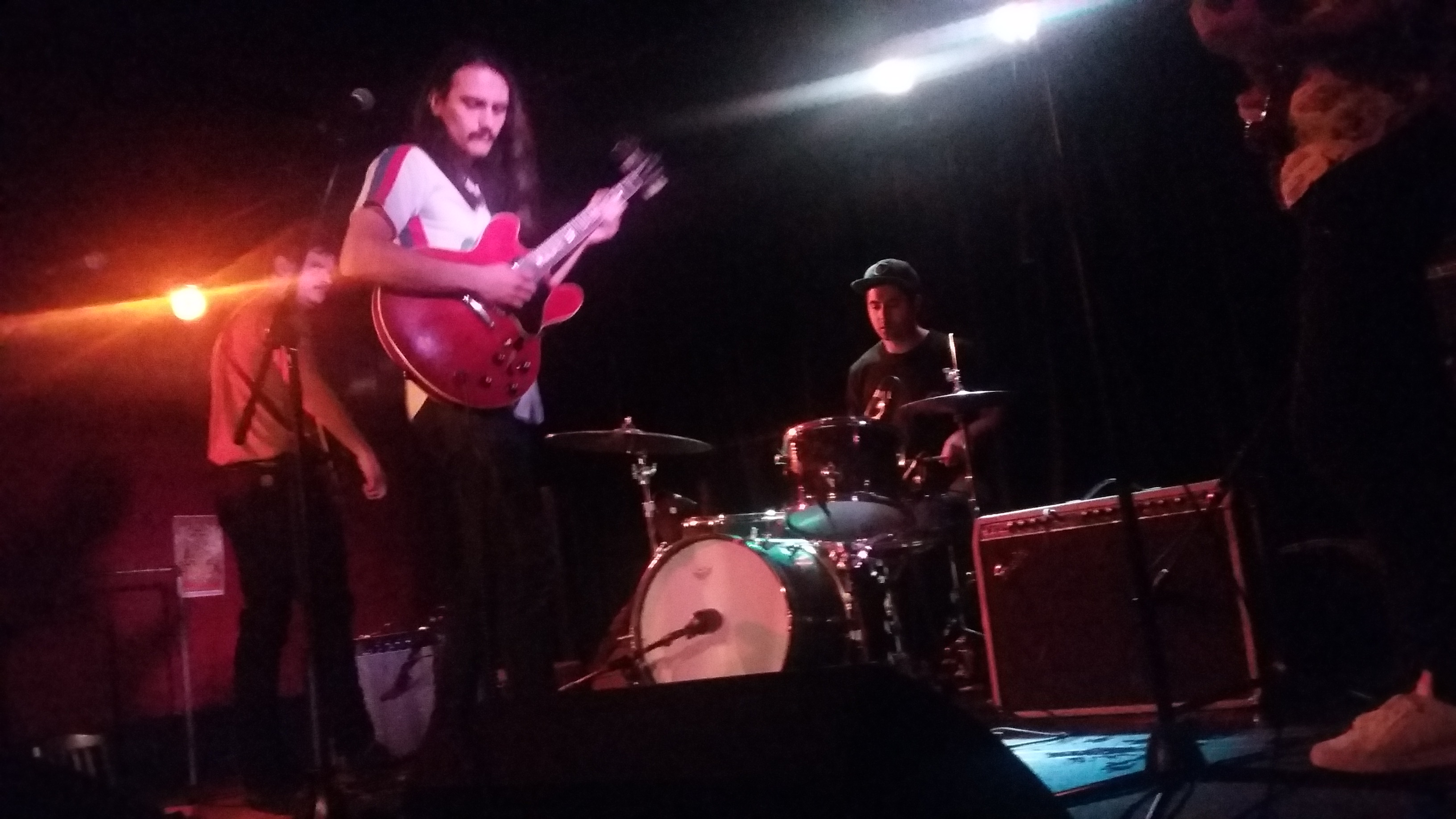
- Michael Rault performing at Divan Orange in Montreal

Background information
- Born: 22 January 1989 (age 36); Edmonton, Alberta, Canada
- Genres: Indie rock
- Website: michaelrault.com

Michael Rault (born 22 January 1989) is a Canadian producer, engineer, singer-songwriter and guitarist. He was born in Edmonton, Alberta.

== Career ==
Rault released Living Daylight in 2015. The album received a rating of 7.3 on Pitchfork. The single "Nothing Means Nothing" was premiered by Spin magazine. In 2018, he released It's A New Day Tonight on Wick Records, the indie rock subsidiary of Daptone Records. Rault has shared stages with Charles Bradley, Whitney, and Dent May.

== Discography ==
- Living Daylight (2015)
- It's a New Day Tonight (2018)
- Michael Rault (2022)
