= On the Echoing Green =

Studio album by Jefre Cantu-Ledesma
- Released: June 16, 2017
- Recorded: Winter 2015 - October 2016
- Genre: Shoegaze
- Length: 38:22
- Label: Mexican Summer

Jefre Cantu-Ledesma chronology
A Year with 13 Moons (2015)	On the Echoing Green (2017)	Tracing Back The Radiance (2019)

Singles from On the Echoing Green
- 1. "A Song of Summer" Released: April 4, 2017

On the Echoing Green is a studio album by American multi-instrumentalist Jefre Cantu-Ledesma. It was released by Mexican Summer on June 16, 2017. Recording for the album lasted from the winter of 2015 until around October 2016. For vocals, Cantu-Ledesma hired Argentinian singer-songwriter Sobrenadar, who sings in Spanish, after hearing one of her songs online. Sonically, On the Echoing Green is a shoegaze album influenced by pop music and soft rock, a departure from Cantu-Ledesma's previous music that was variously described as ambient, noise, drone, and post-rock. On the Echoing Green received generally positive reviews from critics and was featured on year-end lists of the best experimental albums by Pitchfork and of the best shoegaze albums by PopMatters. The album's second track, "A Song of Summer", was placed on a user-generated list curated by The Guardian in March 2020.

== Background and recording ==
Cantu-Ledesma released A Year with 13 Moons in 2015 to widespread acclaim from critics. He began recording On the Echoing Green in the winter of 2015. Within the first three days, Cantu-Ledesma had recorded roughly six to nine hours of material. Throughout the process, he and guitarist Byron Westbrook added various instruments and layers to the tracks. For vocals, Cantu-Ledesma contacted Argentinian singer-songwriter Sobrenadar after listening to one of her songs online. Cantu-Ledesma was inspired to work with others after hearing a live Miles Davis recording while at work, and that he had "missed the vibrancy that happens when you get people in a room together." Cantu-Ledesma submitted the album to streaming services in October 2016.

== Composition ==
=== Overview ===
On the Echoing Green is a shoegaze (Note: Attributed to The 405, Exclaim!, Pitchfork, PopMatters, and Tiny Mix Tapes.) album, influenced by pop music and soft rock. It was described by Cantu-Ledesma as "like spring", with "things [coming] alive, blooming, [and] emerging from winter," and that he was "trying to bring out more overt pop elements, to let them come to the front and be present." It was marked as a departure from Cantu-Ledesma's previous music, which was variously described as ambient, noise, drone, and post-rock. Sasha Geffen of Pitchfork felt that album largely encapsulated feelings of temporality from its namesake poem "The Echoing Green", whose plot is a metaphor for the end of youth and, overall, life. Sam Goldner from Tiny Mix Tapes noted that many of the tracks are unorthodox in nature, "unclear as to where [the hooks] even begin or end." Cantu-Ledesma stated in a 2017 interview with Bandcamp that he believed his move to New York City and welcoming his child had an effect on the album. He also felt that On the Echoing Green was his most optimistic work yet. Throughout the album, Cantu-Ledesma wanted to emphasize melody and incorporate pop music into the album, describing his previous A Year with 13 Moons as "so clouded and so dense." Sobrenadar, in the tracks that she is featured on, sings in Spanish, which Cantu-Ledesma felt made the songs "more mysterious. Because you know something explicit is being said but you don't know what it is".

=== Songs ===
The opening track, "In a Copse", contains warped and pitched-down piano and drums, the former of which was described by Geffen as "ominous". It is followed by "A Song of Summer", a ten-minute song that incorporates thickly-padded guitars conjoined with marginally off-beat synthesizers, phasing in-and-out between it and static. The song also features vocals from Sobrenadar and contains influences from drone music. "The Faun" consists of mellow chord progressions that begin degrading by the four-minute mark and is replaced by waves of static, which was described by Geffen as an attempt by Cantu-Ledesma "to keep his regular chaos at bay." The fifth track, "Tenderness", begins with a simple tom and hi-hat pattern that persists throughout the song. It also contains elements of new wave music, which was compared by Goldner to "Don't You (Forget About Me)" by Scottish band Simple Minds. He further described "Tenderness" as the most abstract song on the album. "Tenderness" features vocals from Sobrenadar, who mutters along it as guitars and synthesizers play. The song was likened to the band Slowdive by Peter Ellman in a review for Exclaim!. "Vulgar Latin" features guitar strings, played by guitarist Evan Caminiti, combined with static noise. The seventh track on the album, "Autumn", is an 88-second interlude characterized with noise alongside thin and trebly guitar chords. The penultimate track, "Dancers at the Spring", has flat guitar strings conjoined with a faint click track. On the Echoing Green's closing track is "Door to Night", which features abstract vocals contrasted with birdsong, whistling frequencies, and intermittent drums; the song closes with a single note.

== Release and reception ==
Professional ratings
Aggregate scores
Source	Rating
Metacritic	79/100
Review scores
Source	Rating
The 405	8.5/10
AllMusic	4/5 stars
Exclaim!	7/10
Pitchfork	7.7/10
Tiny Mix Tapes	3.5/5 stars

On the Echoing Green was preceded by its lead single – "A Song of Summer" – on April 4, 2017. The song received a review from Kevin Lozano of Pitchfork. On the Echoing Green was released on June 16 by Mexican Summer. It was met with generally positive reviews. At Metacritic, which assigns a rating out of 100 to reviews from professional publications, the album received a weighted average score of 79, based on six reviews. Pitchfork named it the thirteenth-best experimental album of 2017, stating that it brought "the lushest and most organic quality of" shoegaze and ambient music. The album was also listed as the eighth best shoegaze album of 2017 by PopMatters. "A Song of Summer" was particularly highlighted by several critics. Geffen felt that it was "the most openly beautiful" track on the album and Ellman described the song as "11 minutes of bliss". Rob Hakimian of The 405 described it as having been "drawn out of the ether". The track was also included on a user-generated list, entitled "Soothing songs for self-isolation", curated by The Guardian in March 2020.

Simpson of AllMusic compared On the Echoing Green to Cantu-Ledesma's previous album A Year with 13 Moons, describing the former as "an album of rebirth, new possibilities, and optimism". Geffen from Pitchfork said that On the Echoing Green's overall theme worked well with the "lush" and "sensual" guitar chords and noise giving a sense of entropy. They (Note: Geffen uses they/them pronouns.) described the closer "Door to Night" as "hypnagogic". Goldner, in a review for Tiny Mix Tapes, felt that On the Echoing Green "functions like some of the best shoegaze records" and stood apart from the majority of them. Ellman from Exclaim! stated that while the album was "interesting", he criticized it for its length and noise levels. He described the song "Vulgar Latin" as venturing "too far into harsh noise territory for its first half" and felt that the track was disconnected with the rest of the album.

== Track listing ==
On the Echoing Green track listing
No.	Title	Length
1.	"In a Copse"	1:27
2.	"A Song of Summer"	10:07
3.	"Echoing Green"	2:17
4.	"The Faun"	6:43
5.	"Tenderness"	5:01
6.	"Vulgar Latin"	3:14
7.	"Autumn"	1:28
8.	"Dancers at the Spring"	6:00
9.	"Door to Night"	2:05
Total length:		38:22

== Notes and references ==
Notes
