= Carrion Crawler/The Dream =

Studio album by Thee Oh Sees
- Released: November 8, 2011
- Studios: The Hanger, Sacramento, California
- Genres: Garage rock, psychedelic rock, krautrock
- Length: 40:34
- Label: In the Red

Thee Oh Sees chronology
| Castlemania (2011) | Carrion Crawler/The Dream (2011) | Putrifiers II (2012) |

Professional ratings
Aggregate scores
| Source | Rating |
|---|---|
| Metacritic | 83/100 |
Review scores
| Source | Rating |
| AllMusic | 4/5 stars |
| The Austin Chronicle | 4/5 stars |
| The A.V. Club | B+ |
| Beats per Minute | 72% |
| Cokemachineglow | 77% |
| Consequence of Sound | 4/5 stars |
| Filter | 86% |
| Paste | 8.0/10 |
| Pitchfork | 8.0/10 |
| Uncut | 4/5 stars |

Carrion Crawler/The Dream is the twelfth studio album by San Francisco-based garage rock band Thee Oh Sees. It was released on November 8, 2011, by In the Red Records. Despite the running time of the album being comparable or greater than most of their other full-length releases, the vinyl editions state that it is an EP.

== Background ==
Petey Dammit, the band's bassist, claimed that the album "was completely recorded live. 1, 2, 3, press record, go." Brigid Dawson stated that it was recorded over a five-day period. Chris Woodhouse, a frequent collaborator and mix engineer for the band, recorded the album at The Hangar recording studio in Sacramento, CA. John Dwyer, describing the album's sound, said: “As I’m sure most would agree, 'Castlemania' was more of a vocal tirade. This one’s meant to pummel and throb.” The second track is a medley of an original song called "Contraption" with a cover of the song "Soul Desert" by Can. "Contraption" had previously been released as a demo on Singles Vol. 1 + 2. Lars Finberg of the band The Intelligence joined Thee Oh Sees as a second drummer on this recording. The band dedicated the album to the memory of Jerry Fuchs, Jay Reatard, and Gerard Smith.

The album's title was taken from the titles of the first and sixth songs on the album. A "Carrion Crawler" is a centipede-like monster from the Dungeons & Dragons series of roleplaying games. Petey Dammit stated that the album was originally based around "The Dream", but after the band created the song "Carrion Crawler", John Dwyer decided to add its name to the album's title. The songs are completely separate other than their use together as the album's name.

In 2011, Burger Records released a series of cassette tapes by Thee Oh Sees that contained two full-length albums on each cassette. Carrion Crawler/The Dream was paired with the band's other main release from 2011, Castlemania.

== Track listing ==
All tracks are written by Thee Oh Sees, except the lyrics to "Soul Desert" by Malcolm Mooney.

| No. | Title | Length |
|---|---|---|
| 1. | "Carrion Crawler" | 5:50 |
| 2. | "Contraption/Soul Desert" | 5:21 |
| 3. | "Robber Barons" | 5:16 |
| 4. | "Chem-Farmer" | 4:08 |
| 5. | "Opposition" | 1:39 |
| 6. | "The Dream" | 6:52 |
| 7. | "Wrong Idea" | 1:52 |
| 8. | "Crushed Grass" | 2:53 |
| 9. | "Crack in Your Eye" | 3:41 |
| 10. | "Heavy Doctor" | 3:07 |
| Total length: | | 40:34 |

== Personnel ==
Thee Oh Sees

- John Dwyer – lead vocals, guitar
- Brigid Dawson – keyboards, vocals
- Petey Dammit – guitar/bass
- Mike Shoun – drums
- Lars Finberg – drums

Production

- Chris Woodhouse – recording engineer, mixing
- Tardon Feathered – mastering
- Elzo Durt – cover art

== Credits ==
- Chris Woodhouse – engineering
- Elzo Durt – artwork
- Tardon Feathered – mastering
