= Vintage Future =

Studio album by The Intelligence
- Released: September 25, 2015
- Recorded: The Dock, Sacramento, California
- Genre: Post-punk, garage rock
- Label: In the Red Records
- Producer: Chris Woodhouse and Lars Finberg

The Intelligence chronology
Everybody’s Got It Easy But Me (2012)	Vintage Future (2015)

Vintage Future is the ninth studio album by the American post-punk band The Intelligence, released on September 25, 2015 on In the Red Records. The album was produced by vocalist and guitarist Lars Finberg and former guitarist Chris Woodhouse.

The album features contributions from Finberg's former Thee Oh Sees bandmates Brigid Dawson and Petey Dammit.

== Reception ==
Professional ratings
Review scores
Source	Rating
AllMusic	4/5 stars
The A.V. Club	Positive

In a positive review for AllMusic, Heather Phares praised the album's diversity and aesthetic: "Vintage Future is one of the Intelligence's most focused albums, and their most clever and satisfying music in some time." In another positive review for The A.V. Club, David Anthony wrote: "The record is an amalgam of classic sounds updated for the modern era. At times it’s easy to see the influence of Devo or The Stooges, but it even bears a passing resemblance to some of Denton, Texas’ garage-punk greats."

== Track listing ==
All tracks are written by Lars Aldric Finberg.

No.	Title	Length
1.	"Sex"	2:24
2.	"Nocturnal Admissions"	3:18
3.	"Cleaning Lady"	6:17
4.	"Whip My Valet"	1:49
5.	"We Refuse to Pay the Dues"	2:45
6.	"Platinum Janitor"	3:24
7.	"Tourists"	4:54
8.	"Dieu Merci Pour la Fixation de la Machine a Coudre"	4:31
9.	"Romans"	3:36
10.	"Vintage Future"	5:14

== Personnel ==
=== The Intelligence ===
- Lars Finberg - vocals, guitar, keyboards, programmes
- Dave Hernandez - guitar, vocals, keyboards
- Drew Church - bass guitar
- Pete Capponi - drums

=== Additional musicians ===
- Chris Woodhouse - drums (7 & 10)
- Brigid Dawson - backing vocals (7, 8 & 10)
- K. Dylan Edrich - viola and violin (8 & 10)
- Mike Donovan - backing vocals (5)
- Petey Dammit - backing vocals (6)

=== Recording personnel ===
- Chris Woodhouse - producer, recording, mixing
- Lars Finberg - producer

=== Artwork ===
- Lars Finberg - photography
- Monty Buckles - airbrush
- Jun Ohnuki - graphics and layout
