= LAHS =

LAHS or Lahs may refer to:

== Schools ==
- Lake Arthur High School
- Leavitt Area High School
- Leonia Alternative High School
- Little Angels High School, Srinagar
- Los Alamitos High School
- Los Alamos High School
- Los Altos High School (Hacienda Heights, California)
- Los Altos High School (Los Altos, California)
- Los Angeles High School

== Other uses ==
- Lahs (album), 2019 album by Allah-Las
- Curt Lahs (1893–1958), German painter and arts professor
