= The Alps (American band) =

American folk and electronic group

The Alps are a San Francisco, California-based folk and electronic group made up of Alexis Georgopoulos, Jefre Cantu-Ledesma and Scott Hewicker.

== Discography ==
=== Albums ===
- Jewelt Gambles/Spirit Shambles (Spekk, 2006)
- III (Type, 2008)
- Le Voyage (Type, 2010)
- Easy Action (Mexican Summer, 2011)
