= Tarentel =

Tarentel may refer to:

- Tarantella, a traditional Italian dance
- Tarentel (band), an American post-rock group
