= Tracing Back the Radiance =

Tracing Back the Radiance may refer to:

- Tracing Back the Radiance (album), 2019 album by Jefre Cantu-Ledesma
- Tracing Back the Radiance (book), 1991 book by Robert Buswell Jr.
