= Warm Slime =

Studio album by Thee Oh Sees
- Released: May 11, 2010
- Recorded: July 2009
- Venues: Club Six, San Francisco
- Genres: Garage rock, noise rock, psychedelic rock
- Length: 30:48
- Label: In The Red Records

Thee Oh Sees chronology
Dog Poison (2009)	Warm Slime (2010)	Castlemania (2011)

Professional ratings
Review scores
Source	Rating
Allmusic	3.5/5 stars
Drowned in Sound	(8/10)
NME	(7/10)
Pitchfork Media	(6.9/10)
Tiny Mix Tapes	3.5/5 stars

Warm Slime is the tenth studio album by American psychedelic rock band Thee Oh Sees, released on May 11, 2010. The album is the fourth to be released under the name Thee Oh Sees, and is the band's tenth studio album, overall.

== Background ==
The album's liner notes state that the album was "recorded live at 60 6th street in San Francisco in one day, one week after the gay pride parade 2009 on a tascam 388". 60 6th Street in San Francisco was, at the time, the location of Club Six, a hip hop club where John Dwyer worked. Dwyer described Club Six as "A big, airy room with a nice wooden stage, hardwood floors and really high ceilings. I gave them $500 to record in the room for 12 hours." The whole album was recorded "live" with no overdubs in an attempt to recreate the feeling of the band's live performances. Mike Donovan, the leader of Sic Alps, was the only guest musician on the album. Donovan was a past collaborator that had appeared on OCS' 2005 album 3&4, on which he provided vocals for the song "Burning Beauties". Like the majority of the band's catalog, Warm Slime was recorded and mixed by Chris Woodhouse.

Much attention was drawn to the album's title track. At over thirteen and a half minutes long, it was the lengthiest song the band had ever released. Dwyer claimed that he had wanted to record a long-format song like Can's "Yoo Doo Right", The Doors' "When the Music's Over", and Iron Butterfly's "In-A-Gadda-Da-Vida".

== Release ==
The cover art was made by Kyle Ranson. He would later go on to create the cover for Putrifiers II in 2012.

Warm Slime was the only significant release to be excluded from Burger Records' 2011 series of Thee Oh Sees cassettes. Each cassette in the series featured two albums by the band, one for each side of the tape. Instead, Warm Slime was issued on cassette in 2012 by itself. Only 300 were made (same as each of the releases in the 2011 series), and they were individually numbered as a limited edition.

== Track listing ==
No.	Title	Length
1.	"Warm Slime"	13:30
2.	"I Was Denied"	3:38
3.	"Everything Went Black"	3:19
4.	"Castiatic Tackle"	2:26
5.	"Flash Bats"	3:17
6.	"Mega-Feast"	2:10
7.	"MT Work"	2:28

== Personnel ==
Thee Oh Sees

- John Dwyer – guitars, tape, vocals, artwork
- Brigid Dawson – Wurlitzer organ, percussion, vocals
- Petey Dammit – guitar (via EQ pedal and bass amp)
- Mike Shoun – drums

Guest musicians

- Mike Donovan – fuzz guitar, percussion
- Chris Woodhouse – percussion

Production

- Chris Woodhouse – recording engineer, mix engineer
- Kyle Ranson – artwork
- John Dwyer – photography
- Patrick Haight – mastering (cassette version)
- Kevin Ink – mastering (CD and vinyl versions)
