= Mood Rings (band) =

American alternative rock band

- Origin: Atlanta, Georgia, United States
- Genres: Alternative rock, shoegazing, post-punk
- Years active: 2009-2015
- Labels: Mexican Summer
- Members: William Fussell; Tymb Gratz; Christopher Alley; Peter Cauthorn; Seth Bolton
- Website: moodringsmusic.com

Mood Rings (alternatively, Moodrings) are an alternative rock band based in Atlanta. Debuting in 2011 with the EP Sweater Weather Forever, they have since been recognised nationally for their sound, which has been called "engaging" by The Guardian, "lush and ethereal" by BrooklynVegan, "dreamy post-punk" by Stereogum, and "lush, neon hued" by Spin Magazine. Their second single, "Pathos y Lagrimas" was featured in Converse's "Ready, Set: Get Lost" music series. Converse recorded and released a music video for the song on YouTube in October 2012. They released a limited edition silk-screened 7" of "Pathos y Lagrimas" and "333" for Record Store Day 2013, and performed an instore at Atlanta's Criminal Records. Their first album, VPI Harmony, was released on Mexican Summer on 25 June 2013. Heather Phares of Allmusic praised the album, saying "Held together by its oddly luxurious feel, VPI Harmony blends its many sounds and moods into a remarkable debut."

William Fussell relocated to London, England, in 2015 and set up a solo-project titled, Promise Keeper. He released his debut EP on May 19, 2017.

Later in the same year, Fussell began recording alt-country music under the moniker Honey Harper, and released Universal Country, the project's debut EP. He was later joined by his partner Alana Pagnutti, and their debut album, Starmaker, featuring collaborations with Austra and Sébastien Tellier, was released in 2020. Their sophomore album, Honey Harper & the Infinite Sky, followed in 2022.

== Discography ==
=== Studio albums ===
Year	Title
2013	VPI Harmony: Release date: June 2013; Label: Mexican Summer

=== Singles + EPs ===
Year	Title
2011	Sweater Weather Forever: Release date: 2011; Label: Double Phantom
2011	Promise Me Eternity b/w Exorcised Painting: Release date: September 2011; Label: Double Phantom
2013	Pathos y Lagrimas b/w 333: Release date: April 2013; Label: Mexican Summer
2013	The Line: Release date: 2013; Label: Mexican Summer
