= Tussle =

American Band

- Origin: San Francisco, California, United States
- Genres: Freestyle, alternative
- Years active: 2001–present
- Labels: Smalltown Supersound, TMU, Rong DFA, FrequeNC
- Members: Nathan Burazer, Jonathan Holland, Tomo Yasuda, Kevin Woodruff
- Past members: Alexis Georgopoulos, Andy Cabic, Warren Huegel
- Website: www.tussle.org

Tussle is an American four-piece band from San Francisco, United States, formed in 2001 by Nathan Burazer, Jonathan Holland, Alexis Georgopoulos and Andy Cabic. The band released its first album, Kling Klang, in 2004 on Troubleman Unlimited. Their fourth album, Tempest was released in September 2012.

== Discography ==
- Frisco Styles, compilation (Jack Hanley/Rainbow Records), (2003)
- "Eye Contact", 12" (Troubleman Unlimited), (2003)
- Don't Stop, EP (Troubleman Unlimited), (2004)
- Kling Klang (Troubleman Unlimited), 2004
- "Here It Comes", 12" (Troubleman Unlimited), (2005)
- "Disco d'Oro", 12" (Rong Music), (2005)
- "Disco d'Oro II", 12" (Rong Music), (2005)
- "I Am an Indian Too", 12" (Rong), (2005)
- Telescope Mind (Smalltown Supersound), (2006)
- "White Columns", 12" (White Columns Gallery), (2006)
- "Warning", 12" (Smalltown Supersound), (2007)
- Worried Noodles, compilation (Tomlab), (2007)
- "Meh-Teh", 7" (Tomlab), (2007)
- Notwave Compilation (Rong/DFA), (2008)
- "Notwave Sampler", 12" (Rong/DFA), (2008)
- "Animal Cop", 7" (Geographic North), (2008)
- Cream Cuts (Smalltown Supersound), (2008)
- Colett Xpress, compilation (Colett Express), (2008)
- "Titan", 12" (FrequeNC), (2009)
- Tussle / AM444, Split Ends, 12" (Smalltown Supersound / Pause Music / Genjing Records / Uptown Records), (2012)
- Tempest (Smalltown Supersound), (2012)
