= Paul Clipson =

American experimental filmmaker (1965–2018)

- Born: 1965; Cleveland, Ohio, US
- Died: February 3, 2018 (aged 52–53)
- Occupations: Filmmaker; projectionist
- Years active: Early 1990s - 2017
- Spouse: Yelena Soboleva
- Children: Anya Kamenskaya

Paul Clipson (1965 – February 3, 2018) was an American experimental filmmaker and projectionist based in San Francisco. He is best known for his collaborations with musicians, such as Grouper and Jefre Cantu-Ledesma. Clipson's work usually took the shape of "hyper-imposed improvisations" edited live while his musical collaborators performed. Only later would he go back to edit a performance into a film. 2019 saw the release of Landscape Dissolves, a DVD by Re:voir and Students of Decay featuring 14 of Clipson's films from 2009 to 2014.

== Early life ==
Clipson was born in 1965 in Cleveland, Ohio to Scottish designer Ann Gemmell Clipson and professor of architecture Colin Clipson. He grew up in Ann Arbor, Michigan and moved to San Francisco in the 1990s.

== Career ==
In 1995 Clipson filmed his friend and performance artist Adam Heavenrich publicly improvising in San Francisco. The footage was captured on Super 8 film and largely edited in-camera. This resulted in BUCKY, a series of two-minute-long short films released over the next few years.

Clipson's work often took the shape of collaborations with musicians and sound artists. Inspired by musicians' "freedom to create on a whim", he used Super 8 and 16mm projectors to layer his film footage in a live environment. This type of work started in 2003 when Clipson began composing the visuals for the live performances of Cantu-Ledesma's band Tarentel. The two had been friends and colleagues since Clipson hired Cantu-Ledesma to work at the SFMOMA in 2002. They discussed the ways music and film can work together and started performing together. Three years later Clipson officially joined Tarentel as their full-time visual artist.

Clipson has been working as head projectionist and AV manager at the San Francisco Museum of Modern Art since around 2000. In 2014 Clipson released REEL, a book composed of drawn and written notes from 1999 up to 2013 composed by Clipson for his colleagues at the museum. The book was published by LAND AND SEA. The book came with a 20-minute found footage film.

In 2015 Clipson collaborated with Harris on an experimental feature-length film called Hypnosis Display. The movie was a commission for Leeds Opera North. For the music Harris employed field recordings and cassette tapes.

In a 2017 Interview, Clipson details his creative process. He usually records footage without a purpose in mind to later use it in live collaborations with musicians, calling these sessions "hyper-imposed improvisations". Clipson goes on to describe his short films as "crystallizations of particular sections of footage I’ve become close to".

Paul Clipson died on February 3rd 2018.

== Influence ==
In a 2017 interview, Clipson names American filmmaker Bruce Baillie as an influence. A 2018 obituary written by personal friend Max Goldberg and archived by SFMOMA shines a spotlight on Clispon's knowledge of film history. Goldberg goes on to mention the many influences of Clipson: Baillie, Otto Preminger, Chantal Akerman, Jonas Mekas, Stan Brakhage, Orson Welles, Frank Stauffacher, Saul Bass and Elia Kazan, among many others.

Zabriskie Point by Michelangelo Antonioni was one of Clipson's favorite movies.

== Reception ==
Otie Wheeler, writing for MUBI Notebook, calls Clipson "an experimental, lyrical filmmaker in the tradition of Stan Brakhage".

Clipson's death has been mourned by many artists worldwide, but especially in the local bay area scene. Scott Barley called Clipson an "inspiration" and an "unsung luminary of the moving image". In an obituary, William Basinski was quoted saying "He is brilliant. I adored his work the minute I saw it." "It was at times quite remarkable how he could uncover through his visual medium things that I never would have heard in my own music," says Sarah Davachi. Another collaborator, Gregg Kowalsky, noted that Clipson's excitement was palpable to all of his collaborators.

== Filmography ==
Year	Title	Notes	Ref(s).
1996	BUCKY 1		
1996	BUCKY 2		
1998	BUCKY 3		
1998	BUCKY 4		
1999	BUCKY 5		
2004	Bump Past Cut Up Through Windows	Music by Tarentel	
2004	Big Black Square	Music by Tarentel	
2004	Put It On The Ground	Music by Tarentel	
2005	Two Suns	Music by Jefre Cantu-Ledesma	
2006	Earthlight	Music by Jefre Cantu-Ledesma	
2006	Over Water	Music by Jefre Cantu-Ledesma	
2006	Watercolor Night Montage No. 7	Music by Jefre Cantu-Ledesma	
2006	The Lights and Perfections	Music by Jefre Cantu-Ledesma	
2006	Constellations	Music by Jefre Cantu-Ledesma	
2007	Passageways	Music by Tarentel	
2007	Corridors	Music by Jefre Cantu-Ledesma	
2007	Sun Place	Music by Tarentel	
2007	Echo Park	Music by Tarentel	
2007	Tuolumne	Music by Tarentel	
2007	The Phantom Harp	Music by Jefre Cantu-Ledesma	
2007	Bend Sinister	Music by Metal Rouge	
2008	Within Mirrors	Music by Jefre Cantu-Ledesma	
2008–2009	Sphinx On The Seine	Music by Jefre Cantu-Ledesma	
2009–2011	Chorus	Music by Jefre Cantu-Ledesma	
2009–2012	Origin	Music by Che Chen	
2010	Union	Music by Jefre Cantu-Ledesma	
2010	Light From The Mesa	Music by Barn Owl	
2011	Compound Eyes No.1	Music by Jefre Cantu-Ledesma	
2011	Odonata (Compound Eyes No.2)	Music by Jefre Cantu-Ledesma	
2011	Diptera and Lepidoptera (Compound Eyes No.3)	Music by Jefre Cantu-Ledesma	
2011	Araneae (Compound Eyes No.4)	Music by Jefre Cantu-Ledesma	
2011	Caridea and Ichthyes (Compound Eyes No.5)	Music by Jefre Cantu-Ledesma	
2012	Speaking Corpse	Music by Jefre Cantu-Ledesma	
2012	Another Void	Music by Jefre Cantu-Ledesma	
2012	The Crystal Text	Music by Young Moon	
2012	Absteigend	Music by Evan Caminiti	
2012	Landscapes Dissolves	Music by Alex Cobb	
2013	Other States	Music by Jefre Cantu-Ledesma	
2013	Difficult Loves	Music by Jefre Cantu-Ledesma	
2013	Bright Mirror	Music by Jefre Cantu-Ledesma	
2013–2014	Light Year	Music by Tashi Wada	
2014	Transparent Things	Music by Jefre Cantu-Ledesma	
2014	La Paloma	Music by Austin Cesear	
2014	Hypnosis Display	Music and sound by Liz Harris	
2014	REEL	Collection of found video clips featuring cue marks	
2014	Pulsars e Quasars	Music by Arp	
2014	The Liquid Casket / Wilderness Of Mirrors	Music by Lawrence English	
2014	Made Of Air	Music by Grouper	
2014	Trajections	Music by Arp	
2014	Love After Love	Music by Jefre Cantu-Ledesma	
2015	Come On	Music by Ilyas Ahmed	
2015	Distorting With A Shadow	Music by Alex Cobb	
2015	Lighthouse	Music by King Midas Sound and Fennesz	
2016	Fell on My Face	Music by Young Moon	
2016	Feeler	Music by Sarah Davachi	
2016	Love's Refrain	Music by Jefre Cantu-Ledesma	
2016	Headache	Music by Grouper	
2017	Cruel Optimism	Music by Lawrence English	
2017	Spectral Ascension	Music by Byron Westbrook	
2017	Total Fiction	Music by Shinya Sugimoto and Jeremy Young	
2017	Tenderness	Music by Jefre Cantu-Ledesma	
2017	at hand	Music by Sarah Davachi	
2017	Black Field	Music by Zachary Watkins	
