= Norma Tanega =

American folk and pop singer-songwriter and painter (1939–2019)

- Born: Norma Cecilia Tanega; January 30, 1939; Vallejo, California, U.S.
- Died: December 29, 2019 (aged 80) Claremont, California, U.S.
- Genres: Folk; pop; experimental; Latin jazz
- Occupations: Musician, painter
- Instruments: Guitar; vocals; percussion
- Years active: 1966–2019
- Labels: New Voice Records; RCA Records

Norma Cecilia Tanega (January 30, 1939 – December 29, 2019) was an American folk and pop singer-songwriter, painter, and experimental musician. In the 1960s, she had a hit with the single "Walkin' My Cat Named Dog" and wrote songs for Dusty Springfield and other prominent musicians. In later decades, Tanega worked mostly as a percussionist, playing various styles of music in the bands Baboonz, hybridVigor, and Ceramic Ensemble. She also wrote "You're Dead", which was used as the theme song of the film What We Do in the Shadows and the TV series of the same name.

== Biography ==
=== Early life ===
Norma Tanega was born in Vallejo, California, near San Francisco, and grew up in Long Beach. Her mother, Otilda Tanega, was Panamanian. Her father, Tomas Tanega, was Filipino and worked as a bandmaster for 30 years in the United States Navy. During that time, he served aboard the USS Hornet before eventually leading his own band. Norma's older brother Rudy served in the United States Air Force.

Tanega began classical piano lessons at age nine. She entered Long Beach Polytechnic High School in 1952 and in her senior year directed the school's art gallery. By age 16, she was exhibiting her paintings at both Long Beach's Public Library and its Municipal Art Center, playing Beethoven and Bartók at piano recitals, and writing poetry. At age 17, she entered Scripps College on a scholarship, graduating in 1960 before continuing her studies at Claremont Graduate School, earning an MFA in 1962.

Tanega spent a summer backpacking in Europe and moved to New York City to pursue her artistic career. While living in Greenwich Village, she was involved in the folk music scene and political activism, including early opposition to United States involvement in the Vietnam War.

=== Music career ===
==== "Walkin' My Cat Named Dog" ====
Tanega worked for a short time at a mental hospital, where she sang and played songs for patients. She spent her summers working as a camp counselor upstate in the Catskill Mountains. Brooklyn-based record producer Herb Bernstein saw Tanega performing while visiting the camp one summer. Impressed by what he saw, Bernstein introduced her to Four Seasons songwriter Bob Crewe. The two men produced a number of recordings that comprised Tanega's first album and singles to be released on Crewe's New Voice Records label in 1966.

Her first single, "Walkin' My Cat Named Dog", became an international hit in 1966, peaking at number 22 on both the U.S. Billboard Hot 100 and the UK Singles Charts, and #3 in Canada. Tanega's impetus for the song came from living in a New York City apartment building that did not allow dogs; instead she owned a cat which she named "Dog" and took for walks. The single's success landed her appearances on American Bandstand and Where the Action Is, and a slot as the only woman on a North American tour with Gene Pitney, Bobby Goldsboro, Chad and Jeremy and The McCoys. During the tour, Tanega was initially backed by members of the Outsiders. Since they were unable to follow Tanega's more idiosyncratic music, the Outsiders were later replaced by session musicians accompanying her onstage. While some of her songs riffed on traditional tunes like "Hey Girl", derived from Lead Belly's take on "In the Pines", many of her songs diverged from the structure of typical pop and folk music, such as her song "No Stranger Am I", set to a 5/4 time signature.

While Tanega's next three singles had less commercial success than "Walkin' My Cat Named Dog", her debut album was named after its big hit and its popularity spawned several cover versions by contemporary artists. A month after Tanega's single entered the charts, Barry McGuire cut a version on the heels of his number one hit "Eve of Destruction". The T-Bones did an instrumental take on it later that year, and both the Jazz Crusaders and Art Blakey released jazz treatments of the song in 1967. International versions adapted the song into other languages. Madagascar yé-yé group Les Surfs translated it as "Mon Chat Qui S'Appelle Médor" for the French-speaking and African markets, Belgium's Lize Marke released it as "Wanneer Komt Het Geluk Voor Mij" ("When Comes This Happiness For Me") in Dutch, and Jytte Elga Olga interpreted it as "Min Kat – Herr Hund" ("My Cat, Mister Dog") on a Danish 45.

==== Years in the United Kingdom ====
In 1966, Tanega traveled to England to promote her music. Her tour included a performance on the ITV program Ready Steady Go!, where she met British pop singer Dusty Springfield. After Tanega returned to the U.S., Springfield made many transatlantic calls to her and accrued a large phone bill. On a visit to New York, Springfield entered a romantic relationship with Tanega. They returned to England and lived together for five years.

The couple took up residence in London's Kensington district, where Tanega continued to paint and play music. Springfield recorded many of Tanega's songs. These included "No Stranger Am I", the 5/4 number that originally appeared on Tanega's first album; "The Colour of Your Eyes", which Tanega wrote for Springfield in Venice, Los Angeles; "Earthbound Gypsy" and "Midnight Sounds", both co-written in New York with Tanega's high school friend Dan White; and "Come for a Dream", co-written with bossa nova musician Antônio Carlos Jobim. Tanega also penned the English language lyrics for Springfield's version of "Morning", a cover of the song "Bom Dia" by Gilberto Gil and Nana Caymmi. In 1970, Tanega teamed up with jazz pianist Blossom Dearie to write a song about Springfield for Dearie's album That's Just the Way I Want to Be.

Many of Tanega's songs appeared as non-album B-sides to Springfield's singles. Some, like the outtake "Go My Love", appeared only on collections released years after their recording. Tanega also went uncredited for many of her collaborations with Springfield, and by 1970 their relationship was deteriorating. Tanega secured a contract with the British division of RCA Records, for whom she recorded the album I Don't Think It Will Hurt If You Smile in 1971 with producer/keyboardist Mike Moran and Don Paul of British rock group The Viscounts. When Tanega returned to the U.S. before the album's promotion, it failed to achieve the chart success of her earlier work. Dusty Springfield biographer Annie J. Randall said of the record, "I hear many references to Norma's relationship with Dusty on this album. It stands to reason that Dusty would be the object of affection in the love songs."

==== Later work ====
In 1972, Tanega moved back to Claremont, California, and took jobs teaching music and English as a second language. She returned to painting and exhibiting her artwork—with frequent support from the Claremont Museum of Art—and sometimes combined with her musical performances. Musically she switched from playing guitar to percussion and her style evolved from folk-rock singer-songwriting to more instrumental and experimental music. In the 1980s, she was a member of Scripps ceramics professor Brian Ransom's Ceramic Ensemble, a group that played Ransom's handmade earthenware instruments. Over the years, Ceramic Ensemble played at universities, folk festivals, and art museums.

In the 1990s, Tanega founded the group hybridVigor, starting as a duo with Mike Henderson for their first album, then expanding to a trio with the addition of Rebecca Hamm for their second album. In 1998, Tanega formed the Latin Lizards with Robert Grajeda, and the duo released the album Dangerous in 2003.

Her next band was called Baboonz with guitarist Tom Skelly and bassist Mario Verlangieri. The trio released a self-titled CD in 2008, the album HA! in 2009, and a third called 8 Songs Ate Brains in 2010. Other recording projects soon followed, including the album Push with John Zeretzke, Twin Journey with Steve Rushingwind Ruiz, and a return collaboration with Ceramic Ensemble sound sculptor Brian Ransom for their album Internal Medicine.

=== Death and legacy ===
Tanega died of colon cancer on December 29, 2019, at her home in Claremont, California, aged 80. That same year, Warner Music released the collection In the Shadows comprising some of her early solo recordings after renewed interest in her music from its use on the What We Do in the Shadows TV series.

In 2022, Anthology Editions published Tanega's paintings for the first time, including journal entries and a range of other ephemera titled Try to Tell a Fish About Water. That same year, Anthology Recordings also released the album I’m the Sky: Studio and Demo Recordings, 1964–1971, compiling both released and unreleased material from Tanega's early music career.

== In other media ==
Beyond the mid-1960s buzz around Tanega's sole hit single and the number of songs she contributed to Dusty Springfield's repertoire, many other musicians have continued to record their own versions of Tanega's early work. Garage rock group Thee Oh Sees covered "What Are We Craving?" on their 2011 album Castlemania. Her one chart hit, "Walkin' My Cat Named Dog", has continued the rounds in other musicians' repertoires: Dr. Hook included it in a 1996 three-disc collection; Yo La Tengo performed it in 2010; and They Might Be Giants recorded it in 2013 for release on their 2015 children's album Why?

In 2014, Tanega's song "You're Dead" from her first album, which was written as a sarcastic statement about her struggles in New York's competitive music scene, was used in the opening credits of the New Zealand vampire comedy film What We Do in the Shadows and was remixed to become a running theme for its characters. Starting in 2019, the song was also used as the opening credits theme for the film's American television adaptation. The show ran for six seasons, ending in 2024, and several of its episodes featured cover versions of the song.

In 2015, Sienna Sebek portrayed Tanega in a London stage production based on the life of Dusty Springfield. Critics panned the show, one writing that the Tanega-Springfield relationship was reduced to, "they meet, fall in love, have a relationship and break up all within the space of a [sic] 10 minutes or so." Anabello Rodrigo reprised the role for a 2016 production featuring 3-D virtual effects.

== Discography ==
=== Solo ===
==== Albums ====
- Walkin' My Cat Named Dog (New Voice, 1966)
- I Don't Think It Will Hurt If You Smile (RCA, 1971)

==== Compilations ====
- In the Shadows (Warner Music Group, 2019)
- I'm the Sky: Studio and Demo Recordings, 1964–1971 (Anthology Recordings, 2022)

==== Singles ====
- "Walkin' My Cat Named Dog" / "I'm the Sky" (New Voice, 1966)
- "A Street That Rhymes at Six A.M." / "Treat Me Right" (New Voice, 1966)
- "Bread" / "Waves" (New Voice, 1966)
- "Run, On the Run" / "No Stranger Am I" (New Voice, 1967)
- "Nothing Much Is Happening Today" / "Antarctic Rose" (RCA, 1971)

=== Group projects ===
==== hybridVigor ====
- hybridVigor (1996)
- II by 3 (2000)

==== Latin Lizards ====
- Dangerous (2001)

==== Norma Tanega and John Zeretzke ====
- Push (2003)

==== Norma Tanega and Brian Ransom ====
- Internal Medicine (2008)

==== Baboonz ====
- Baboonz (2008)
- HA! (2009)
- 8 Songs Ate Brains (2011)

==== Norma Tanega and Steve Rushingwind Ruiz ====
- Twin Journeys (2012)

== Bibliography of works by Norma Tanega ==
- Tanega, Norma (2022). Try to Tell a Fish About Water. Brooklyn, NY: Anthology Editions. pp. 150. ISBN 978-1-944860-35-6.
