= Putrifiers II =

Studio album by Thee Oh Sees
- Released: September 11, 2012
- Genres: Garage rock, psychedelic rock, experimental
- Length: 36:47
- Label: In the Red

Thee Oh Sees chronology
Carrion Crawler/The Dream (2011)	Putrifiers II (2012)	Floating Coffin (2013)

Professional ratings
Review scores
Source	Rating
AllMusic	3.5/5 stars
The A.V. Club	(C)
BPM	(80%)
Drowned in Sound	(8/10)
No Ripcord	(9/10)
Paste	(8.3/10)
Pitchfork	(8.1/10)
Slant	4/5 stars
Tiny Mix Tapes	4/5 stars

Putrifiers II is the thirteenth studio album by the American garage rock band Thee Oh Sees (and the seventh released under the full Thee Oh Sees name), released on September 11, 2012, on In The Red Records.

== Background ==
John Dwyer's previous band Yikes recorded a song called "Putrifiers" for their 2006 album Secrets to Superflipping. This song also influenced on the Thee Oh Sees' "Ghost In The Trees" from 2008's The Master's Bedroom Is Worth Spending a Night In.

Similar to Dog Poison and Castlemania, the recording was primarily undertaken by John Dwyer. Brigid Dawson was the only other member of the band to appear on the album. Dawson noted the album's expanded palette of sounds: "It seems to me that [John Dwyer] got to stretch out his wings, be a bit of a composer with a wider and richer array of sounds to play around with." Guest musicians on the album included Heidi Alexander from The Sandwitches, who recorded additional vocals and trumpets, and Mikal Cronin who played saxophone. Chris Woodhouse returned as mix engineer and guest musician and recorded the album at The Hangar recording studio in Sacramento, CA.

== Release ==
This is the second album by Thee Oh Sees to feature cover art by Kyle Ranson. He was also the cover artist for their 2010 album Warm Slime

The version of the album released in Australia includes a second disc of previously unreleased demos. Additionally, a larger collection of twenty demos was released as a standalone album for digital music retailers. The photo on the back of the inner sleeve of Putrifiers II was used as the cover for this album. One of the demos, "Wait Let's Go" was not included on Putrifiers II, but was re-recorded for the band's 2012 split single with The Mallard. The single is part of record label Famous Class' ongoing LAMC series, a charity single series where all proceeds go to benefit the Ariel Panero Memorial Fund at VH1 Save the Music.

== Track listing ==
All tracks are written by John Dwyer.

No.	Title	Length
1.	"Wax Face"	4:01
2.	"Hang a Picture"	3:55
3.	"So Nice"	3:53
4.	"Cloud #1"	1:45
5.	"Flood's New Light"	2:32
6.	"Putrifiers II"	6:11
7.	"Will We Be Scared?"	5:24
8.	"Lupine Dominus"	3:29
9.	"Goodnight Baby"	3:28
10.	"Wicked Park"	2:09
Total length:		36:47

Australian Edition Disc 2: Demos
No.	Title	Length
1.	"Lupine Dominus"	2:39
2.	"Hang A Picture"	3:15
3.	"Say You Love Another"	3:19
4.	"Cat Food"	1:42
5.	"Regular Meat"	3:15
6.	"Goodnight Baby"	2:33
7.	"I Am Smoke"	2:03
8.	"Wax Figure"	2:09
Total length:		20:55

== Personnel ==
- John Dwyer - guitar, bass, keyboards, vocals, cello, drums, flute, and "electronics"
- Brigid Dawson - vocals
- Chris Woodhouse - drums, bass, and percussion
- Heidi Alexander - vocals, trumpet
- Mikal Cronin - saxophone
- K. Dylan Edrich - viola

== Credits ==
- John Dwyer - recording engineer, photography
- Tardon Feathered - mastering
- John Harlow - layout
- Matt Jones - layout
- Kyle Ranson - cover art
- Chris Woodhouse - recording engineer
