= Robert Lester Folsom =

American singer-songwriter and guitarist

- Born: January 3, 1955 (age 71); Adel, Georgia
- Genres: Rock, Folk Rock
- Occupations: Musician, Producer, Songwriter
- Instrument: Guitar
- Years active: 1976-present
- Label: Anthology Recordings
- Website: www.robertlesterfolsom.com

Robert Lester Folsom (born January 3, 1955) is an American singer-songwriter and guitarist from Georgia. He is best known for the independently released album Music and Dreams (recorded 1976), later reissued by Mexican Summer in 2010, which brought renewed attention to his 1970s recordings. Archival collections of his early home recordings have since been released by Anthology Recordings, including Ode to a Rainy Day: Archives 1972–1975 (2014) and Sunshine Only Sometimes (2022).

== Early Life ==
Robert Lester Folsom was born in Adel, Georgia, on January 3, 1955. As a child, he grew up listening to a variety of musical styles, including rock, pop, gospel, R&B, country, and bluegrass. After watching the Beatles perform on the Ed Sullivan Show in 1964, Folsom was inspired to perform, and traded his record player for his friend's acoustic guitar.

== Career ==
=== 1972-1975: Home recordings and Abacus ===
In 1972, Folsom bought a Sears 3440 two-track reel-to-reel tape recorder, which he used to record his own compositions with local friends, including Don Fleming. That year, Folsom spent a few weeks in Nashville in an attempt to get his music published, but he was told to come back when he finished high school.

In 1975, Folsom formed the band Abacus in Atlanta, Georgia, before relocating to Auburn, Alabama, then back to Adel when the band struggled to find gigs. A tape recorded by the band at LeFevre Studios, Atlanta caught the attention of engineer Stan Davis, who suggested that Folsom return to record his own songs. This resulted in Music and Dreams, released as a solo album in 1976.

=== 1976-2008: Music and Dreams and aftermath ===
Music and Dreams received some local radio airplay, but garnered little to no national or international attention. Folsom planned on recording a second album with the working title Warm Horizons, but this did not come to fruition. Over the following years, Folsom primarily worked as a house painter, though he continued to write songs and perform in local church bands while he raised a family. Folsom has referred to this period of his life as "the big void", during which time he strayed from his dreams of becoming a professional musician.

=== 2009-present: Career revival ===
In 2009, Folsom was told that a record company was interested in reissuing Music and Dreams, which resulted in the album receiving a widespread release in the United States as well as Japan and South Korea. The album was later given a wider release on the label Mexican Summer, and Folsom soon found himself to be an in-demand artist as his music found a wider audience. Folsom later reconnected with Fleming, who helped digitise the tapes they recorded in the early 1970s; these were later released as Ode to a Rainy Day: Archives 1972-1975 in 2014 on Anthology Recordings. Since then, two additional compilations of Folsom's home recordings have been issued; Sunshine Only Sometimes (2022) and If You Wanna Laugh, You Gotta Cry Sometimes (2026).

Alongside the reissues of Music and Dreams and his early home demos, Folsom has continued to record and release new music. His second studio album, Beautiful Nonsense, was released in 2016, forty years after his first.

Music and Dreams was reissued in 2026 to celebrate its 50th anniversary, featuring bonus tracks including covers by the likes of Beach House.

== Discography ==
- Music and Dreams (recorded 1976; private press; reissued 2010 and 2026)
- Beautiful Noise (2016)
- Ode to a Rainy Day: Archives 1972–1975 (2014)
- Sunshine Only Sometimes (2022)
- If You Wanna Laugh, You Gotta Cry Sometimes: Archives Vol. 3, 1972-1975 (2026)
