= Tempest (Tussle album) =

Studio album by Tussle
- Released: October 16, 2012
- Genre: Indie rock
- Length: 44:38
- Label: Smalltown Supersound
- Producer: J.D. Twitch

Tussle chronology
| Cream Cuts (2008) | Tempest (2012) |

Tempest is the thirteenth studio album by San Francisco band Tussle. It was released in October 2012 under Smalltown Supersound records, and produced by J.D. Twitch of Optimo

Professional ratings
Aggregate scores
| Source | Rating |
|---|---|
| Metacritic | 71/100 |
Review scores
| Source | Rating |
| Allmusic | 4/5 stars |
| XLR8R | 7.5/10 |
| Pitchfork | 6/10 |
| MusicOMH | 3/5 stars |

== Track listing ==
| No. | Title | Length |
|---|---|---|
| 1. | "Yume No Muri" | 6:31 |
| 2. | "Moondog" | 5:47 |
| 3. | "Cat Pirate" | 8:09 |
| 4. | "P44" | 6:38 |
| 5. | "Eye Context" | 6:30 |
| 6. | "Yellow Lighter" | 5:59 |
| 7. | "Lightly Salted" | 5:04 |
