= Petey Dammit =

American musician

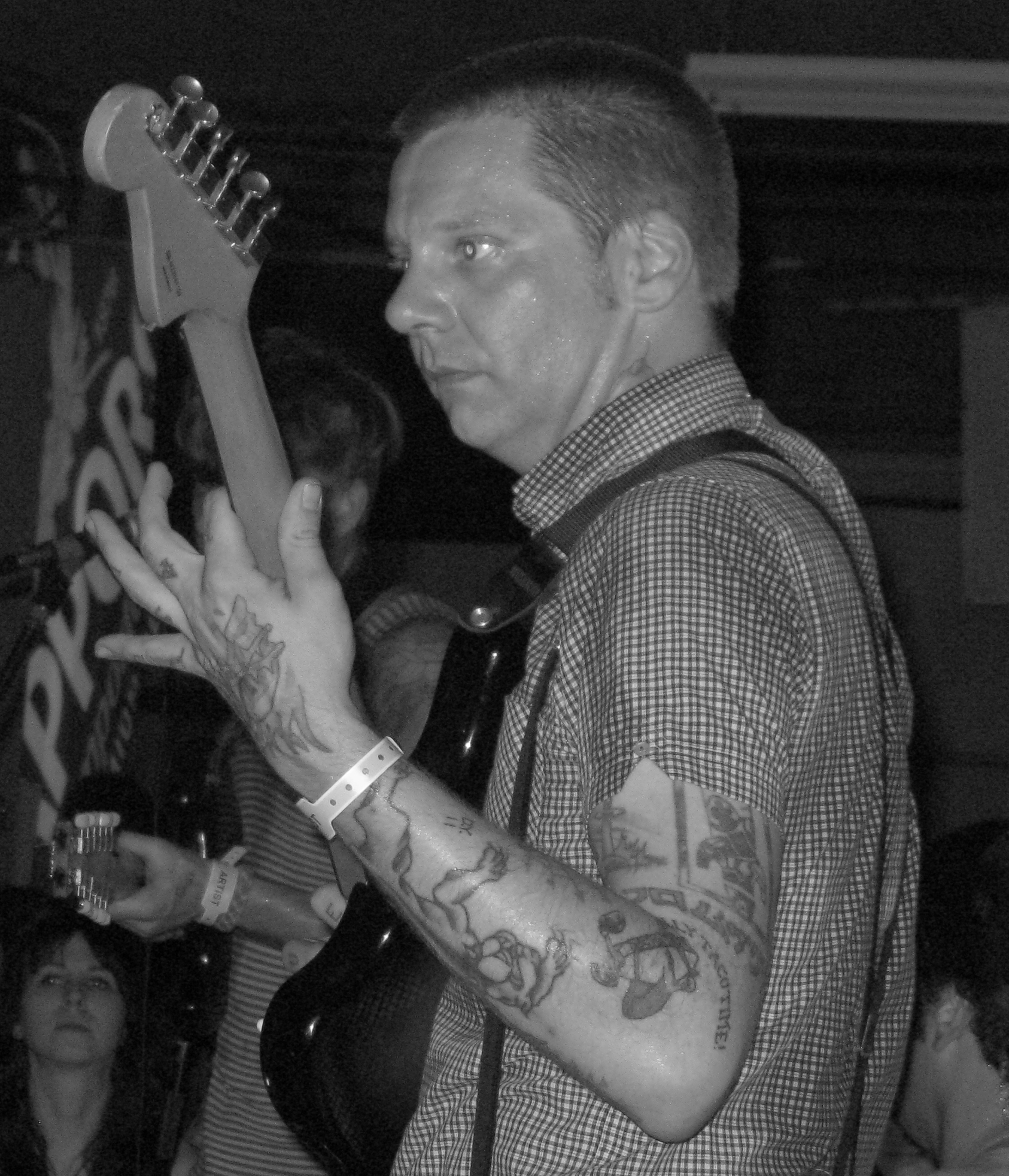
- Dammit performing with Thee Oh Sees in 2011

Background information
- Genres: Garage rock
- Instruments: Guitar, bass guitar
- Labels: In the Red, Castle Face
- Formerly of: Thee Oh Sees, The Intelligence
- Website: www.theintelligenceband.com

Petey Dammit, often stylized as Petey Dammit!, is an American guitarist and bass guitarist. He is best known as a former member of the garage rock band Thee Oh Sees, with whom he recorded six studio albums. From 2014 to 2015 he performed with the post-punk band The Intelligence.

== Other work ==
Dammit is the subject of the documentary film, Petey & Ginger - A Testament to the Awesomeness of Mankind, directed by Ada Bligaard Søby.

== Discography ==
with Thee Oh Sees

- Sucks Blood (2007)
- The Master's Bedroom is Worth Spending a Night In (2008)
- Help (2009)
- Warm Slime (2010)
- Carrion Crawler/The Dream (2011)
- Floating Coffin (2013)

Other appearances

- The Intelligence - Vintage Future (2015)
