= Mexican Summer =

American independent record label

- Founded: 2009
- Founder: Keith Abrahamsson and Andres Santo Domingo
- Genre: Indie rock; indie pop; psychedelic; punk; shoegaze; heavy metal; experimental
- Country of origin: U.S.
- Location: Brooklyn, New York City
- Official website: www.mexicansummer.com

Mexican Summer is an independent record label founded in 2009 by Keith Abrahamsson and Andres Santo Domingo. Based in Brooklyn, the label has released recordings from artists including Best Coast, Kurt Vile, Ariel Pink, Allah-Las, Weyes Blood, Connan Mockasin, Jessica Pratt, and Cate Le Bon. The label is named after the song "Mexican Summer" by Marissa Nadler.

In 2013, T: The New York Times Style Magazine described the label as "a bastion for experimental pop, not to mention a model for successful music publishing in the 21st century."

== History ==
Mexican Summer began in fall 2008 as a subscription service for limited edition, ornately packaged vinyl pieces. On September 2, 2008, they released their first 12" vinyl single Sätt Att Se, from the Swedish rock band, Dungen. “I think the whole idea of Mexican Summer really just came because I wanted to try to develop artists in a different way,” said Abrahamsson. The label continued to add bands to its roster, including early releases from Washed Out, Real Estate, Kurt Vile, and The Tallest Man on Earth.

In October 2009, Mexican Summer opened Co-Op 87, a brick and mortar store in Greenpoint with several other record labels, an idea Santo Domingo called a "vinyl co-op store." In 2011, the label established a recording studio in the same location, Gary's Electric. A second record store, Brooklyn Record Exchange, was opened in March 2019 in Bushwick.

In 2011, Mexican Summer and Kemado Records introduced a new subsidiary label called Software Recording Co. (2011–2016). It was run by Daniel Lopatin, who records under the name Oneohtrix Point Never. Software Recording Co. focused mainly on experimental electronic and dance music. The label's inaugural release was a collaborative album with Lopatin and Joel Ford, Channel Pressure. In March 2016, the label released their final album, Arcology, from Thug Entrancer.

Over the years, Mexican Summer has expanded its catalog to over 200 releases across multiple formats. The label's roster includes releases from Tamaryn, Allah-Las, the Alps, Weekend, and No Joy. One of the label's largest successes was the 2010 release of Crazy For You, the debut album from Best Coast. Additionally, Weyes Blood released her second album, The Innocents (October 2014), and her third album, Front Row Seat to Earth (October 2016), which was met with great acclaim throughout the music industry. In September 2017, Ariel Pink released his first solo LP on the label, Dedicated to Bobby Jameson.

Mexican Summer also launched Anthology Recordings in 2014 as its reissue imprint, serving vinyl and formats unforeseen.

Since 2014, Mexican Summer and contemporary arts nonprofit Ballroom Marfa have organized the annual music festival and multidisciplinary cultural program, Marfa Myths, held in Marfa, Texas. Marfa Myths showcases established and emerging artists, with notable performers including Roky Erickson, Annette Peacock, Pharoah Sanders, Kelsey Lu, Deerhunter, Amen Dunes, No Age, and Wire.

In November 2018, Mexican Summer celebrated the label's 10th anniversary with "A Decade Deeper," an all day festival at Pioneer Works, a cultural center in Red Hook, Brooklyn. Performers included Ariel Pink, Allah-Las, Tonstartssbandht, F.J. McMahon, Quilt, Jess Williamson, Drugdealer, Jefre Cantu-Ledesma, Part Time, Pill, Arp, Dungen, Cate Le Bon, Photay, and Ben Steidel.

The label is distributed in the United States through AMPED Distribution and in the United Kingdom and Europe through Integral.

== Artists ==
- Allah-Las
- Arp
- Best Coast
- Black Moth Super Rainbow
- Bobb Trimble
- Cate Le Bon
- Connan Mockasin
- Dungen
- Eddy Current Suppression Ring
- Ford & Lopatin
- Gauntlet Hair
- Greg Ashley
- Hayden Pedigo
- Home Blitz
- Iceage
- Jacuzzi Boys
- Jefre Cantu-Ledesma
- Jess Williamson
- Jessica Pratt
- John Carpenter
- Kurt Vile
- Lansing-Dreiden
- Light Asylum
- Linda Perhacs
- Little Girls
- L'Rain
- Lucky Luke
- Marissa Nadler
- Mood Rings
- Nachtmystium
- Nite Jewel
- No Joy
- Orkustra
- Peaking Lights
- Peter Matthew Bauer
- Photay
- Purling Hiss
- Quilt
- Ramases
- Real Estate
- Steve Moore
- Tamaryn
- The Alps
- The Amazing
- The Black Ryder
- The Fresh & Onlys
- The Soft Pack
- The Tallest Man on Earth
- The Vacant Lots
- The Young
- Tonstartssbandht
- VietNam
- Washed Out
- Weekend
- Weyes Blood
- Wooden Shjips

== Anthology Recordings ==
Anthology Recordings is a reissue imprint. The label was founded by Mexican Summer A&R man, Keith Abrahamsson, in 2004, and has reissued records from artists such as Trad Gras Och Stenar, Linda Perhacs, and Rüdiger Lorenz, among others.

In 2016, Anthology Recordings expanded its repertoire, and began publishing books under the imprint, Anthology Editions.

=== Reissues by Anthology Recordings ===
- Bernard Fèvre – Suspense (2012)
- Morning of the Earth – Morning of the Earth OST (2014)
- Crystal Voyager – Crystal Voyager OST (2014)
- Creation Rebel / New Age Steppers – Threat to Creation (2014)
- Robert Lester Folsom – Ode to a Rainy Day: Archives 1972–1975 (2014)
- Robert Lester Folsom – Music and Dreams (2014)
- The Stroke Band – Green and Yellow (2014)
- Bali High – Bali High OST (2014)
- Andrew Kidman – Litmus (2015)
- Andrew Kidman – Glass Love (2015)
- Bernard Fèvre – Cosmos 2043 (2015)
- Michael Angelo – Michael Angelo (2015)
- Rudiger Lorenz – Invisible Voices (2015)
- Black Devil Disco Club – Black Devil Disco Club (2015)
- Tully – Sea of Joy (2016)
- Ilian – Love Me Crazy (2015)
- Tamam Shud – Evolution (2016)
- Trad Gras Och Stenar – Mors Mors (2016)
- Trad Gras Och Stenar – Djungens Lag (2016)
- Various Artists – Follow the Sun (2017)
- F.J. McMahon – Spirit of the Golden Juice (2017)
- Pharoah Sanders – Tauhid (2017)
- Pharoah Sanders – Jewels of Thought (2017)
- Pharoah Sanders – Summun Bukmun Umyun – Deaf Dumb Blind (2017)
- Various Artists – Paul Major: Feel the Music Vol. 1 (2017)
- The Nightcrawlers – The Biophonic Boombox Recordings (2018)
- Various Artists – Sad About The Times (2019)
- Art Lown - Piper Oz The Hound(2021)
- Norma Tanega – I'm the Sky: Studio and Demo Recordings, 1964–1971 (2022)

== Anthology Editions ==
Mexican Summer
- Founded: 2016
- Founder: Keith Abrahamsson, Andres Santo Domingo
- Country of origin: United States
- Headquarters location: Brooklyn
- Distribution: Ingram Distribution (US, EU, UK); UTP (CA); Books at Manic (AU)
- Key people: Andres Santo Domingo (Founder); Keith Abrahamsson (Founder); Jesse Pollock (Managing Director); Casey Whalen (Director of Sales & Marketing)
- Nonfiction topics: Art, Photography, Design, Illustration
- Official website: www.anthologyeditions.com

Anthology Editions is an independent book publisher based in Brooklyn, New York. An imprint of the record label Mexican Summer, Anthology Editions was originally founded by Keith Abrahamsson and Andres Santo Domingo in 2016. The publishing company was an expansion of the existing Anthology Recordings brand, founded in 2004, and was run by Managing Director Jesse Pollock until 2025.

The books of Anthology Editions typically center on music-related or counter-cultural subject matter, and feature contributions by Lou Reed, Joan E. Biren, Jonas Mekas, Jerry Hsu, Dennis Stock, Emma Kohlmann, Ed Emberley, Joe Roberts and more.

=== Books published ===
- Jack Womack – Flying Saucers are Real (2016)
- Johan Kugelberg with Jon Savage and Glen Terry – God Save Sex Pistols (2016)
- Tino Razo – Party in the Back (2017)
- Peter Coffin – Imaginary Concerts (2017)
- Jonh Ingham – Spirit of 76: London Punk Eyewitness (2017)
- Paul Major with Johan Kugelberg and Mark Iosifescu – Feel the Music: The Psychedelic Worlds of Paul Major (2017)
- Jonas Mekas – A Dance with Fred Astaire (2017)
- Peter Watts – Altered States: The Library of Julio Santo Domingo (2017)
- Peter Coffin – Imaginary Concerts Volume Two (2018)
- Lou Reed – Do Angels Need Haircuts? (2018)
- David Hollander – Unusual Sounds: The Hidden History of Library Music (2018)
- Matthew Craven – Primer (2018)
- Jane Dickson – Jane Dickson in Times Square (2018)
- Joe Roberts – We Ate the Acid (2018)
- CF – Pierrot Alterations (2018)
- Jerry Hsu – The Beautiful Flower is the World (2019)
- Natalie Anne Howard – From Gardens Where We Feel Secure (2019)
- Brian Blomerth – Brian Blomerth's Bicycle Day (2019)
- Grace Srinivasiah and Alex Tults – Crude Intentions (2019)
- Dennis Stock – California Trip (2019)
- Jonathan Higbee – Coincidences (2019)
- Ed Emshwiller – Dream Dance: The Art of Ed Emshwiller (2019)
- Akasha Rabut – Death Magick Abundance (2020)
- Paul Drummond – 13th Floor Elevators: A Visual History (2020)
- Tim Presley – Under the Banner of Concern (2020)
- CF – William Softkey and the Purple Spider (2020)
- Lavender Suarez – Transcendent Waves: How Listening Shapes Our Creative Lives (2020)
- JEB (Joan E. Biren) – Eye to Eye: Portraits of Lesbians (2021)
- Jim Jarmusch – Some Collages (2021)
- Brian Blomerth – Brian Blomerth's Mycelium Wassoni (2021)
- Norma Tanega – Try to Tell a Fish About Water (2022)
- Mark A. Rodriguez – After All is Said and Done: Taping the Grateful Dead, 1965–1995 (2022)
- Ted Greenwood – Obstreperous (2022)
- Faith Hubley & Elizabeth Swados – Skydance (2023)
- ANOHNI and Marti Wilkerson – Blacklips: Her Life and Her Many, Many Deaths (2023)
- Patrick D. Pagnano – Empire Roller Disco (2023)
- Joe Roberts – LSD Worldpeace (2023)
- Elias B. Rønnenfelt – Sunken Heights (2023)
- Ed Emberley – Suppose You Met A Witch (2023)
- Ken Grimes – Evidence For Contact (2023)
- Håkan Agnsäter, Mats Eriksson Dunér, Jakob Sjöholm & Jonas Stål – Träd Gräs och Stenar: A Collective History (2023)
- Emma Kohlmann – Watercolors (2024)
- Richard King – Travels Over Feeling: Arthur Russell, a Life (2024)
- Ken Werner – Halloween (2024)
- Kate Sterlin – Still Life (2024)
- Ralph Hopkins & Gili Rappaport – They Call Me the Mayor of Riis Beach (2024)
- Patrick O'Dell – Epicly Later'd (2024)
- Brian Blomerth – Brian Blomerth's Lilly Wave (2024)
- Ed Emberley – The Wizard of Op (2025)
- Lori Emerson – Other Networks: A Radical Technology Sourcebook (2025)
- JEB (Joan E. Biren) – Making A Way: Lesbians Out Front (2025)
- Nicolas Devil and Jean Rollin – Saga De Xam (2025)
