= Castlemania =

2011 studio album by Thee Oh Sees

Studio album by Thee Oh Sees
- Released: May 10, 2011
- Genres: Garage rock, psychedelic rock, psychedelic folk, experimental
- Length: 41:56
- Label: In the Red

Thee Oh Sees chronology
Warm Slime (2010)	Castlemania (2011)	Carrion Crawler/The Dream (2011)

Professional ratings
Review scores
Source	Rating
AllMusic	3.5/5 stars
The A.V. Club	(B+)
One Thirty BPM	(74%)
Paste	(7.9/10)
Pitchfork	(7.6/10)
Spin	(7/10)
Tiny Mix Tapes	4/5 stars

Castlemania is the eleventh studio album by the American garage rock band Thee Oh Sees, the fifth album released by the band under the name "Thee Oh Sees" and their eleventh overall. It was released on May 20, 2011, by In The Red Records. It was the first of two studio albums to be made by the band in 2011, the other being Carrion Crawler/The Dream, which was released in November. It was recorded by a skeleton lineup of John Dwyer and Brigid Dawson along with some guest musicians.

== Production ==
Like the band's past album Dog Poison, and the later album Putrifiers II, the album was created mostly by frontman John Dwyer. Brigid Dawson was the only other core member of the band to appear on the album. The liner notes (apparently written by Dwyer) state that it was "the last record worked on at 608 c haight street in san francisco (very near and dear to my heart and heavy in my memories) before control was assumed by rich assholes. enjoy". Bandmember Brigid Dawson explained that "Castlemania was really John doing a bunch of home recordings, and then taking them into a studio and really layering it. He took some time over it." When asked about the theme of death on the album, Dawson suggested that the recent deaths of some close friends could have factored into Dwyer's songwriting. Dwyer described the album's material as "songs about bad things, packaged in a summery record about getting numb to life and its little pleasures as you take it for granted with age.”

The album concludes with three covers: "I Won't Hurt You" by The West Coast Pop Art Experimental Band, "If I Stay Too Long" by The Creation, and "What Are We Craving?" by Norma Tanega. "What Are We Craving?" is a rare example of bandmember Brigid Dawson singing lead vocals.

The album contained no singles, but a music video was made for the first song, "I Need Seed". It features John Dwyer wearing different masks, and then riding his bicycle to the beach in a series of still photos.

== Packaging ==
The artwork, like some of the other albums by Thee Oh Sees, was created by William Keihn, a friend of the band. The album cover prominently features Fisher-Price's Chatter Telephone, a pull toy that was introduced in 1962, and continues to be produced today.

The vinyl version of this album was made by In The Red Records, and was pressed onto two 12" records that run at 45 RPM. Sides A and B were pressed onto gold-yellow vinyl, and Sides C and D were pressed onto traditional black vinyl. Side D contains no music, but instead features an etching of a bouquet of flowers. The phrase "We're Dead As I've Already Said" (a lyric from the third song on the album, "Stinking Cloud") is also etched along the outer edge. The design on Side D is also featured on the face of the CD version of the album. The names of three songs are slightly changed on the vinyl version when compared to the digital and CD track listings. The vinyl track listing changes Tracks 5, 6, and 8 into "Pleasure Blimp", "A Wall, A Century", "Whipping Continues", respectively.

In 2011, Burger Records released a series of cassette tapes by Thee Oh Sees that contained two full-length albums on each cassette. Castlemania was paired with Carrion Crawler/The Dream, which was released later in 2011.

== Track listing ==
All songs written by John Dwyer, except where noted.

No.	Title	Length
1.	"I Need Seed"	2:55
2.	"Corprophagist (A Bath Perhaps)"	2:13
3.	"Stinking Cloud"	3:11
4.	"Corrupted Coffin"	2:08
5.	"Pleasure Blimps"	2:42
6.	"A Wall, A Century 2"	2:42
7.	"Spider Cider"	0:58
8.	"The Whipping Continues"	2:27
9.	"Blood on the Deck"	2:18
10.	"Castlemania"	2:31
11.	"AA Warm Breeze"	3:03
12.	"Idea for Rubber Dog"	1:28
13.	"The Horse Was Lost"	3:52
14.	"I Won't Hurt You" (Shaun Harris, Michael Lloyd, and Bob Markley)	2:32
15.	"If I Stay Too Long" (Bob Garner, Eddie Phillips, and Bruce Rawling)	3:34
16.	"What Are We Craving?" (Norma Tanega)	3:22

== Personnel ==
Per the album liner notes:

Thee Oh Sees

- John Dwyer – lead vocals, drums, guitar, bass, flute, clarinet, keyboards, trumpet, synth, harmonica, percussion
- Brigid Dawson – backing vocals (14), lead vocals (16)

Guest musicians

- Ty Segall – drums and bass (6), vocals (14)
- Heidi Maureen Alexander – vocals (14)

Production and design

- Eric Bauer – engineering
- John Dwyer – engineering and photography
- Weasel Walter – mastering
- John Harlow – layout
- Matt Jones – layout
- William Keihn – artwork
