= Chris Douglas (musician) =

American electronic musician (born 1974)

O.S.T.
- Also known as: O.S.T. Dalglish; Rook Valard; Wooli Bodin; Scald Rougish
- Born: Chris Douglas; 4 August 1974 (age 52)
- Origin: San Francisco
- Genres: Experimental; IDM; Ambient; Industrial; Electronic; Musique concrete Noise; Electro-acoustic; Avant-garde
- Occupations: Musician; Composer; Songwriter; Programmer; Remixer; Disc jockey Sound designer Foley artist
- Instruments: Piano; Synthesizers; Drum machine Electronics; Laptop computer Guitar
- Years active: 1992 – present
- Labels: Isolate Records; Phthalo; Dial Records; Highpoint Lowlife; Record Label Records; Shitkatapult; Polyrhythmic; Emanate Records; Qlipothic; PAN
- Formerly of: The Church Steps
- Website: http://www.amhain.net

Chris Douglas (born 4 August 1974), known primarily for his work as O.S.T., is an electronic musician from San Francisco, California. He is noted for helping to develop the style of music that came to be known as intelligent dance music (IDM).

== History ==
Douglas was introduced to the all-night rave party scene in 1990. This inspired him to start to DJ and make tracks, and at just sixteen he began throwing the first Techno/Ambient parties in San Francisco. At the age of 17, Douglas left for Detroit to find creative freedom. While there he worked with several of his heroes; Mike Banks of the fabled Underground Resistance and the late James Stinson of Drexciya.

Adopting the pseudonym O.S.T., Douglas recorded his first EP for the Detroit-based Switch Records in 1992. This was the beginning of a more than 20 year career spent pushing the boundaries of electronic music. He later explained to The Wire magazine, "I have been alone since an early age and through my work I learned a lot about expression, humanity, emotions."

In 2002, Douglas was invited by Autechre to join them as support act on their Confield tour. Following this, they also requested that he perform at the All Tomorrow's Parties festival they curated in April 2003. Douglas relocated to Berlin following an undisclosed "tragic event" and has remained there ever since.

2012 was a busy year for Douglas; in the space of one year he released a double album and EP on Icasea, compiled several DJ mixes, performed live at Roskilde, Exotic Pylon and CTM Festivals, self-released the album Onsime via his Amhain Bandcamp page, and contributed a remix to Ektoise's Distortions album.

== Also known as ==
- O.S.T.
- Rook Vallade
- Rook Valard
- Dalglish
- Scald Rougish
- Wooli Bodin
- Harry Rod
- Amhain
- ACLDS
- S.o.T.
- SCLD
- Seaes

== Discography ==
=== Albums ===
- 1995 Rook Valard - Systematic Desensitization (Phthalo)
- 1995 O.S.T. - Fuckin' Twats Missed It (Phthalo)
- 1998 O.S.T. - Death Notice (Phthalo/Thousand)
- 1998 O.S.T. - Fashion For Passion (Dial Records)
- 1998 O.S.T. - Live @ Nina's (Phthalo)
- 1998 O.S.T. - Live @ Static (Phthalo)
- 1999 O.S.T. - Live At Globule, Mills College (Phthalo)
- 1999 O.S.T. - Bad Music and Buttprints (Dial Records)
- 2000 O.S.T. - Deflect (Emanate Records)
- 2001 O.S.T. - Seimlste (Qlipothic)
- 2002 O.S.T. - Fimt (Isolate Records)
- 2003 O.S.T. - Does Not Play Well With Others (Polyrhythmic)
- 2004 Dalglish - OtJohr (Highpoint Lowlife)
- 2008 O.S.T. - Waetka (Ideal Recordings)
- 2008 Dalglish - Ideom (Record Label Records)
- 2008 O.S.T. - Synken Outtakes (Adozen)
- 2011 Dalglish - Benacah Drann Deachd (Highpoint Lowlife/Record Label Records)
- 2012 Scald Rougish - Auen Ansici / Bardachd (Icasea)
- 2012 O.S.T. - Onsime (self-released)
- 2013 Dalgish - Niaiw Ot Vile (Pan)
- 2018 ACLDS - Fuadain Liesmas (Entr'acte)
- 2018 ACLDS - Fuadain Liesmas Appandages (self-released)
- 2018 Amhain - k[:\y/b[4.g\ (self-released)

=== EPs ===
- 1992 O.S.T. - Basilar EP (Switch Records Canada)
- 1997 O.S.T. - Aspire (12") (Qlipothic)
- 2000 Rook Vallade - Rook Vallade (Dial Records)
- 2012 Scald Rougish - BnS EP (Icasea)
- 2014 Dalglish - Dorcha Aigeann (EP) (Ge-stell)

=== Remixes ===
- 1996 Spacetime Continuum - "Simm City (O.S.T. Mix)", rEMIT rECAPS (Astralwerks/Reflective Records)
- 2010 Dntel – "In Which Our Hero Finds a Faithful Sidekick (Dalglish mix)", Early Works, Later Versions (Phthalo)
- 2012 Ektoise - "Venerandum (Scald Rougish remix)", Distortions (777 Operations)

=== Compilations ===
- 1995 Mini-Compilation 1 - Rook Valard - "Creace" (Plug Research)
- 1997 Alt.Frequencies.2: Disco Moonlight - Rook Valard - "Stochast" (Worm Interface)
- 1998 Alternative Frequencies 3 - Rook Valard - "Intelligent Guess" (Worm Interface)
- 2000 Alt. Frequencies 4 - Rook Valard - "Crowslish" (Worm Interface)
- 2003 All Tomorrow's Parties 3.0 - O.S.T. - "DfDE" (ATP Recordings)
- 2007 Club Transmediale 07 - O.S.T. - "Synken (Excerpt)" (rx:tx)
- 2009 Strike 100 - Dalglish - "Inoktu" (Shitkatapult)

=== Videos ===
- 2002 White Box Live ACT2 POLITICS (DVD) (VCD) (Drum Machine Museum)
- 2005 Symül von Transforma & O.S.T. (DVD) (Shitkatapult)
- 2007 Synken von Transforma & O.S.T. (DVD) (Shitkatapult)

== Equipment ==
Synthesizer	Drum machine	Sequencer	Software
Yamaha DX7	Roland TR-606	Alesis MMT8	Logic Pro
Roland TB-303	Roland TR-808	PowerBook	Digital Performer
Roland SH-101	Roland TR-707		Max/Msp
Roland MC-202	Roland R-8		Metasynth

== Other projects ==
The Church Steps with Mike Donovan From The Sic Alps

== See also ==
- Shitkatapult
- Dial Records (1998)
- Astralwerks
- Worm Interface
