= Fake Surfers =

Studio album by The Intelligence
- Released: May 26, 2009
- Genre: Lo-fi, punk rock
- Length: 32:05
- Label: In the Red Records

The Intelligence chronology
Deuteronomy (2007)	Fake Surfers (2009)	Crepuscule with Pacman (2009)

Professional ratings
Review scores
Source	Rating
AllMusic	3.5 /5 stars
Pitchfork Media	(7.3/10)

Fake Surfers is an album by Seattle lo-fi post-punk band the Intelligence, released on In the Red Records in 2009.

== Track listing ==
No.	Title	Length
1.	"South Bay Surfers"	3:22
2.	"Moody Tower"	2:12
3.	"Debt & E.S.P."	2:23
4.	"Saint Bartolomeu"	3:22
5.	"I Hear Depression"	2:58
6.	"Warm Transfers"	2:20
7.	"Fuck Eat Skull"	2:17
8.	"Universal Babysitter"	2:15
9.	"Thank God for Fixing the Tape Machine"	3:05
10.	"Pony People" (Wounded Lion Video on YouTube)	3:31
11.	"Singles Barge"	2:41
12.	"The Unessential Cosmic Perspective"	1:43

== Guests ==
- Monty Buckles (of The Lamps) - vocals and synth on #4, guitar on #6
- Brian Carver (of Christmas Island) - vocals on #2, #6, and #11
- Brad Eberhard (of Wounded Lion) - vocals on #3, #6, and #11
