= The Young =

American indie rock band

The Young are an indie rock band from Austin, Texas. They released their first album, Voyagers of Legend, in 2010 on Mexican Summer. Afterwards they signed with Matador Records, through whom they released the albums Dub Egg (2012) and Chrome Cactus (2014). The Young have opened for Kurt Vile and The Sonics.
