= Allah-Las =

American rock band

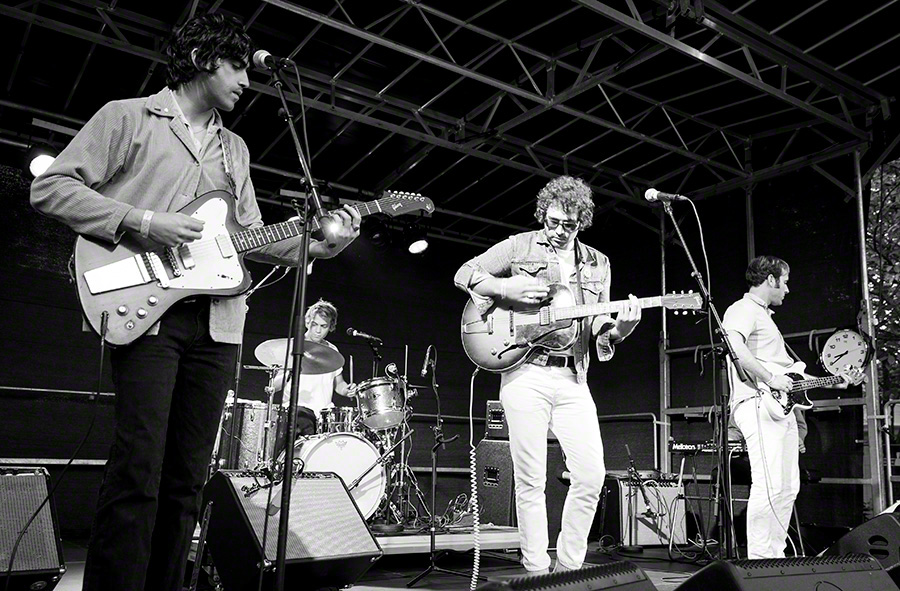
- Allah-Las performs at Piknik i Parken in Oslo on 25. June 2016.

Background information
- Origin: Los Angeles, California, U.S.
- Genres: Psychedelic rock, garage rock, folk rock, rock and roll, surf rock, jangle pop
- Years active: 2008–present
- Labels: Pres, Innovative Leisure, Mexican Summer, Because Music
- Members: Matthew Correia; Spencer Dunham; Miles Michaud; Pedrum Siadatian
- Website: allahlas.com

Allah-Las are an American rock band from Los Angeles, California, formed in 2008. The band consists of Miles Michaud (vocals, guitar), Matthew Correia (percussion, vocals), Spencer Dunham (bass, vocals), and Pedrum Siadatian (lead guitar, vocals).

== History ==
The group was founded in 2008, when school friends Matt Correia and Spencer Dunham met Pedrum Siadatian while working together at Amoeba Records in Los Angeles. They began jamming, and together with Correia and Dunham's fellow school friend, Miles Michaud, formed the band. They released their first 7-inch recording in 2011, "Catamaran/Long Journey", produced by Nick Waterhouse for his 'Pres' label. In 2012, they released a second single, "Tell Me (What's on Your Mind)/Sacred Sands", produced again by Waterhouse but this time for their new label, Innovative Leisure. One reviewer commented that "their sound is steeped in the pop sensibilities of The Zombies, The Kinks and The Yardbirds, laced with Northern Soul, lo-fi funk and the ever-enduring influence of Arthur Lee and Love". Allah-Las were featured in a Daytrotter session in May 2012 and their performance of "Catamaran" was named one of the top 200 Daytrotter songs of the year.

In September 2012, Allah-Las released their self-titled debut LP, also produced by Waterhouse for Innovative Leisure. The album has been described as "an effortlessly wistful batch of starry-eyed, minor-key beauties that gently ruminate on the usual young-guy subjects: sex, freedom, the ways the former can interfere with the latter and vice versa". In October 2012, NPR's World Café featured two songs of Allah-Las, noting that "the music captures the carefree, breezy sounds of California... dreamy romanticism [with] a vibe that can feel both joyous and melancholy". In October 2019, the album landed at no. 22 on Happy Mag's list of "The 25 best psychedelic rock albums of the 2010s", labeled as "a staple in surf-rock and ’60s revival."

Allah-Las completed their first tour in 2011, up the California coast from San Diego to San Francisco. They toured the East Coast and Europe during 2012, where their first show in London, UK was described by The Guardian as "a blissful 45 minutes on a cold night". In 2014 they released their second album, Worship the Sun.

The group released their third album, Calico Review, on September 9, 2016, out on Mexican Summer. The album was recorded in mid-2016 at the Valentine Recording Studio in Los Angeles, California.

In August 2017, an Allah-Las concert in Rotterdam was cancelled after Dutch police, acting on a tip-off from their Spanish counterparts, stopped a van containing gas canisters near the venue. The event occurred six days after an Islamist terror cell killed 16 people in the Barcelona area.

On November 3, 2017, the band released the EP Covers #1 on Mexican Summer. The EP consists of four covers of songs by George Harrison, Television, Kathy Heideman, and Further. Noisey's Lindsay MaHarry said of the EP: "Despite their sound’s inherent lightheartedness, the weight of a certain melancholy is palpable. It’s a dichotomy that, on both Covers #1 and the band’s previous releases, elevates Allah Las’s work beyond the confines of the two-dimensional 60s pop they’re often compared to." The EP was recorded in Topanga Canyon, California at the Pump House with the help of Kyle Mullarky.

In October 2019, the band released the album LAHS, which was received with generally positive reviews. Exclaim's Allie Gregory dubbed the album "the perfect atmospheric soundtrack for a backyard party with boozy beverages and adult tokeables", whereas Clash Magazine's Jack Docherty labeled it "a record where the sunshine is too few and far between."

On October 13, 2023, the band released their fifth album, Zuma 85. Cristian Garcia of mxdwn.com called the album "...creative and fresh", while Darryl Sterdan of Tinnitist said, "...Zuma 85 signals the start of a new era for Allah-Las, and finds the band reinventing itself in defiance of the algorithmic categorization and robotic sterility."

== Members ==
=== Current Members ===
- Miles Michaud – vocals, guitar (2008–present)
- Matthew Correia – percussion, vocals (2008–present)
- Spencer Dunham – bass, vocals (2008–present)
- Pedrum Siadatian – lead guitar, vocals (2008–present)

== Discography ==
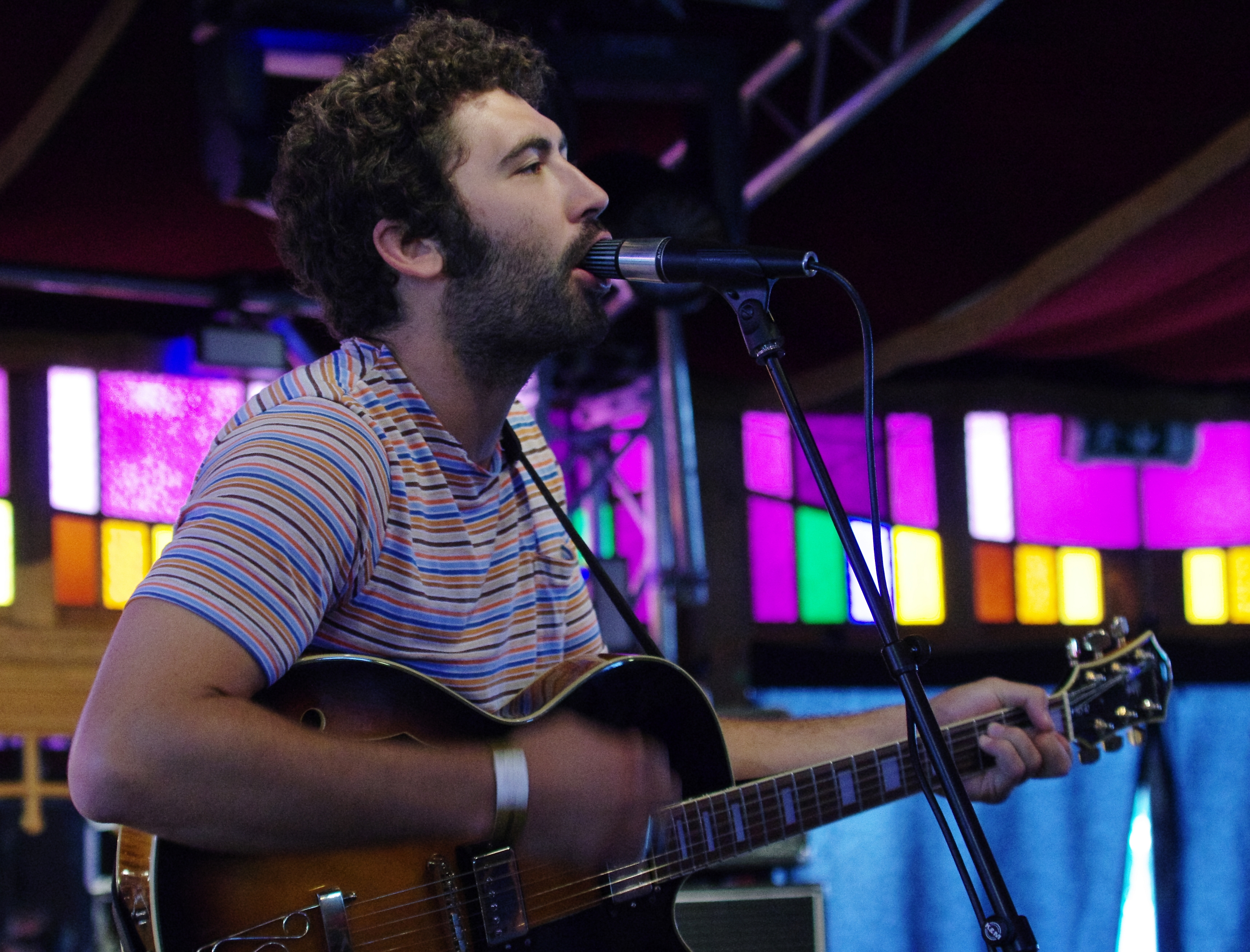
Miles Michaud of Allah-Las live in 2013

=== Singles ===
- "Catamaran" / "Long Journey" – Pres, 2011
- "Tell Me (What's on Your Mind)" / "Sacred Sands" – Innovative Leisure, 2012
- "Don't You Forget It" ('Record Store Day' split release with Nick Waterhouse) – IL, 2012
- "Had It All" b/w "Every Girl" – IL, 2013
- "501-415" b/w "No Werewolf" – IL, 2014
- "Autumn Dawn" (alternate version) b/w "Hereafter" – Mexican Summer, 2017
- "Famous Phone Figure" b/w "Burning in Heaven" – MS, 2017
- "Could Be You" b/w "Brittany Glasz" – MS, 2017
- "Raspberry Jam" – MS, 2019 (from the soundtrack for Self Discovery for Social Survival)

=== Albums ===
- Allah-Las (Innovative Leisure, 2012)
- Worship the Sun (Innovative Leisure, 2014)
- Calico Review (Mexican Summer, 2016)
- LAHS (Mexican Summer, 2019)
- Zuma 85 (Innovative Leisure, 2023)
- Sirenas (Mexican Summer, 2026)

=== Other appearances ===
- "Marionberry Jam" – A Decade Deeper (track 9) – Mexican Summer, 2018
- "Mulberry Jam" – Self Discovery for Social Survival (track 2) – MS, 2019
- "Raspberry Jam" – Self Discovery for Social Survival (track 4) – MS, 2019
- "Blueberry Jam" – Self Discovery for Social Survival (track 5) – MS, 2019
- "Boysenberry Jam" – Self Discovery for Social Survival (track 7) – MS, 2019
- "Blackberry Jam" – Self Discovery for Social Survival (track 8) – MS, 2019
