= Lahs (album) =

Studio album by Allah-Las
- Released: October 11, 2019
- Studio: Bounce House (Los Angeles)
- Genre: Psychedelic pop; surf rock; experimental rock; garage rock; folk rock
- Length: 43:57
- Label: Mexican Summer
- Producer: Allah Las; Jarvis Taveniere

Allah-Las chronology
Calico Review (2016)	Lahs (2019)	Zuma 85 (2023)

Singles from LAHS
- 1. "In the Air" Released: July 23, 2019; 2. "Polar Onion" Released: August 14, 2019; 3. "Prazer Em Te Conhecer" Released: September 18, 2019

Lahs is the fourth studio album by American rock band Allah-Las. It was released on October 11, 2019, by Mexican Summer.

== Reception ==
Professional ratings
Aggregate scores
Source	Rating
Metacritic	70/100
Review scores
Source	Rating
AllMusic	3.5/5 stars
The Austin Chronicle	3.5/5 stars
Exclaim!	7/10
Clash	6/10
Mojo	3/5 stars
Q	3/5 stars
The Times	4/5 stars
Uncut	7/10

Lahs has received positive reviews from critics. At Metacritic, the album received an average score of 70 out of 100 based on 8 reviews, indicating a "generally favourable" reception. In a four-star review for The Times, Will Hodgkinson said "[Allah Las'] fourth album is a particular delight, grooving along with Portuguese country rock ("Prazer Em Te Conhecer"), offering the musical equivalent of an afternoon spent in dry, heavy heat on "Houston" and sounding as if they might have just joined a New Age cult on the celestial "Holding Pattern", adding "their jingle-jangle shimmer makes you feel so good".

== Track listing ==
Credits adapted from liner notes.

Lahs track listing
No.	Title	Writer(s)	Lead vocals	Length
1.	"Holding Pattern"	Siadatian	Siadatian	4:08
2.	"Keeping Dry"	Michaud	Michaud	3:54
3.	"In the Air"	Siadatian	Siadatian	2:13
4.	"Prazer em Te Conhecer"	Siadatian	Correia	3:06
5.	"Roco Ono"	Allah Las		4:02
6.	"Star"	Correia	Correia	4:08
7.	"Royal Blues"	Siadatian	Siadatian	2:32
8.	"Electricity"	Siadatian	Siadatian	2:58
9.	"Light Yearly"	Siadatian	Siadatian	4:01
10.	"Polar Onion"	Dunham; Michaud	Michaud	2:46
11.	"On Our Way"	Michaud	Michaud	3:34
12.	"Houston"	Allah Las		2:13
13.	"Pleasure"	Dunham	Dunham	4:22

== Personnel ==
Allah-Las

- Matt Correia – drums, percussion, vocals (4, 6)
- Spencer Dunham – bass guitar, vocals (13)
- Miles Michaud – rhythm guitar, keys, vocals (2, 10, 11)
- Pedrum Siadatian – lead guitar, keys, vocals (1, 3, 7, 8, 9)

Additional musicians

- Tim Hill – keys, lap steel guitar (2, 3, 9, 12)
- Jeff Luger – spoken word (7)
- John Anderson – bass (13)

Technical

- Allah-Las – production
- Jarvis Taveniere – production, engingeering, mixing
- Dave Cooley – mastering

Art

- Matt Correia – photography, layout, design
- Robbie Simon – layout, design
- Bailey Elder – additional layout

== Charts ==
Chart performance for Lahs
Chart (2019)	Peak position
US Heatseekers Albums (Billboard)	6
US Independent Albums (Billboard)	18
US Vinyl Albums (Billboard)	25
