= Dave Hernandez =

Mexican guitarist, singer and songwriter (born 1970)

- Born: Yanul David Hernandez-Campos LaBastida Barreras; September 22, 1970 (age 55); Guadalajara, Mexico
- Origin: Albuquerque, New Mexico, US
- Genres: Garage rock; indie rock; punk rock; Post-punk
- Occupation: Musician
- Instruments: Guitar; Vocals; Bass
- Years active: 1987–present
- Labels: Sub Pop; 702; Hopeless Records; Empty Records
- Website: theshins.com

Dave Hernandez (born September 22, 1970, Guadalajara, Mexico) is a Mexican guitarist, singer and songwriter. He is best known as a former member of the American indie rock band The Shins, with whom he recorded four studio albums. Hernandez is currently the guitarist of the post-punk band The Intelligence, and is the vocalist and guitarist of the punk band Scared of Chaka.

Hernandez met Shins frontman James Mercer when both lived in Albuquerque playing in underground bands in the early/mid 1990s. Hernandez's punk band Scared of Chaka and Mercer's indie pop band Flake were both part of the thriving Albuquerque independent rock scene that spawned bands like The Drags, The Rondelles, and Henrys Dress.

Among the other bands Hernandez has played in are Broadcast Oblivion, The Charming Snakes, and The Boskos. He has played guitar on records by Big Business and Sean Na Na. He is currently the frontman for Seattle garage band Little Cuts and guitarist for The Intelligence.

== Biography ==
=== Departing The Shins and joining The Intelligence (2011-present) ===
Despite his and his bandmates' departure from The Shins, frontman James Mercer, invited both Hernandez and Crandall to perform on the band's fourth studio album, Port of Morrow (2012), as session musicians. Frontman James Mercer noted: "Well, I liked what they do. So I called them up and asked them. I had a number of things that I really thought Dave would sound good on. Dave Hernandez has a certain sound, tone, and style, and he comes up with ideas that you really don’t get anywhere else."

In 2011, Hernandez joined the post-punk band The Intelligence, with whom he was briefly a member in 2003. With the band he has recorded two studio albums, Everybody's Got It Easy But Me (2012) and Vintage Future (2015).

== Discography ==
with The Shins

- Oh, Inverted World (2001)
- Chutes Too Narrow (2003)
- Wincing the Night Away (2007)
- Port of Morrow (2012)

with The Intelligence

- Everybody's Got It Easy But Me (2012)
- Vintage Future (2015)

with Scared of Chaka

- Hutch Brown Sayngwich (1995)
- Masonic Youth (1996)
- How to Lose (1998)
- Tired Of You (1999)
- Crossing with Switchblades (2001)
