= Jefre Cantu-Ledesma =

American ambient musician

- Origin: San Francisco, California
- Genres: Ambient, drone, noise, experimental
- Years active: 1995–present
- Labels: Root Strata, Temporary Residence, Static Caravan Recordings, Neurot Recordings, Mexican Summer and others

Jefre Cantu-Ledesma is a multi-instrumentalist and an ambient/experimental musician from the United States. He co-founded the drone and ambient label Root Strata.

== Biography ==
Cantu-Ledesma was born and raised in Texas, United States, and studied sculpture and visual arts in San Francisco. Cantu-Ledesma is now based in New York State.

Cantu-Ledesma got his start as one of the founding members of the band Tarentel. He continued to be involved with many musical projects, including experimental rock band The Alps, the solo project Colophon, and the duo Raum (with Grouper).

His solo debut album, Love Is a Stream, released in 2010 under Type Records. Cantu-Ledesma continued to release many solo and collaborative projects, most notably: A Year with 13 Moons in 2015, On the Echoing Green in 2017, Tracing Back the Radiance in 2019, You Can See Your Own Way Out in 2021 with Ilyas Ahmed, and Gift Songs in 2025.

His label, Root Strata, has an extensive catalog that includes artists such as Tarentel, Grouper, Yellow Swans, Charalambides, Keith Fullerton Whitman, Oneohtrix Point Never, Barn Owl, Starving Weirdos, Gregg Kowalsky, and more.

== Discography (by project) ==
=== Tarentel ===
- Tarentel CDEP (Temporary Residence Limited) – 1998
- Travels in Constants vol. 3 CDEP (Temporary Residence Limited), ltd. to 1000 copies, part of the Travels in Constants CD Subscription Series (OOP) – 1999
- When We Almost Killed Ourselves 8" EP (Temporary Residence Limited), ltd. to 200 copies (OOP) – 1999
- From Bone to Satellite CD/2×LP (Temporary Residence Limited), vinyl ltd. to 1000 copies (OOP) – 1999
- Looking for Things, Searching for Things 12-inch EP (Resonant), ltd. to 500 copies (OOP) – 2000
- Two Sides of Myself 7-inch (Static Caravan Recordings), ltd. to 500 copies (OOP) – 2000
- split 7-inch w/ Rothko (Jonathon Whiskey), ltd. to 250 copies (OOP) – 2000
- split 7-inch w/ Lilienthal (Awkward Silence), ltd. to 500 copies (OOP) – 2000
- The Order of Things CD/2×LP (Neurot Recordings/Static Caravan), vinyl ltd. to 500 copies (OOP) – 2001
- Fear of Bridges CDEP (Three Lobed Recordings), ltd. to 700 copies (OOP) – 2002
- Mort aux Vaches CD (Staalplaat), ltd. to 1000 copies (OOP) – 2002
- Ephemera | Singles 99-00 CD (Temporary Residence Limited) – 2002
- Latency 12-inch EP (En/Of), ltd. to 100 copies (OOP) – 2003
- We Move Through Weather CD/2×LP (Temporary Residence Limited) – 2004
- Paper White CDEP (Temporary Residence Limited) – 2005
- Big Black Square CDEP (Temporary Residence Limited) – 2005
- Ghost Weight CDEP (Acuarela Discos) – 2005
- Paper White / Big Black Square CD (Human Highway) – 2005
- Live Edits: Natoma CD (Root Strata), ltd. to 500 copies (OOP) – 2006
- Home Ruckus 12-inch EP (Root Strata), ltd. to 500 copies (OOP) – 2007
- Ghetto Beats On the Surface of the Sun 4×LP (Music Fellowship), ltd. to 500 copies of each LP (OOP) – 2007
- Home Ruckus: Double-Sided Air 7-inch (Type Records), ltd. to 500 copies (OOP) – 2007
- Home Ruckus: Bottled Smoke CD-R (Digitalis), ltd. to 100 copies (OOP) – 2007
- Ghetto Beats On the Surface of the Sun 2×CD (Temporary Residence Limited) – 2007
- Live Edits: Italy & Switzerland CD (Digitalis), ltd. to 500 copies (OOP) – 2008
- You Can't Hide Your Love Forever Vol. 3: Space Junk 7-inch (Geographic North), ltd. to 300 copies, part of the You Can't Hide Your Love Forever 7-inch Subscription Series (OOP) – 2009
- Over Water DVD-R (with Paul Clipson) (Root Strata) - "Latest installment of the ongoing collaboration between San Francisco-based band Tarentel & filmmaker Paul Clipson. Three shorts of Super 8 film and music mostly culled from live performances in Italy & Switzerland in 2005." The release was ltd. to 100 copies (OOP) – 2009
- Split 7-inch w/ Seaworthy (Sound&Fury, 2009/2010), ltd. to 300 copies (100 colored, 200 black) as part of the Passeridae 7-inch Subscription Series
- Untitled cassette (Digitalis Limited, late 2009/early 2010)

=== Jefre Cantu-Ledesma ===
Primary solo project, primarily ambient and drone music.

- Voice Sutra CD-R (limited to 100 copies, OOP) (Root Strata) – 2005
- Two Suns DVD-R (with Paul Clipson) (limited to 100 copies, OOP) (Root Strata) – 2005
- Black is the Color of my True Love's Hair CD-R (limited to 150 copies, OOP) (Static Caravan) – 2006
- Floating Weeds Cassette (limited to 90 copies, OOP) (Twonicorn) – 2006
- Constellations of Spring DVD-R (with Paul Clipson) (limited to 100 copies, OOP) (Root Strata) – 2006
- Shining Skull Breath CD-R (limited to 100 copies, OOP) (Students of Decay) – 2007
- The Garden of Forking Paths CD (Spekk) – 2007
- The Phantom Harp Mini CD-R (limited to 100 copies, OOP) (Root Strata) – 2007
- Corridors DVD-R (with Paul Clipson) (limited to 100 copies, OOP) (Root Strata) – 2008
- The Phantom Harp DVD-R (with Paul Clipson) (limited to 100 copies, OOP) (Root Strata) – 2008
- Namu Kie Butsu Cassette (as Jefre Sei Getsu Ledesma) (limited to 100 copies, OOP) (NNA Tapes) – 2009
- Bloodstream Sermon Cassette (limited to 150 copies, OOP) (Arbor) – 2010
- Within Mirrors Collection of previous DVD-R (with Paul Clipson) plus two previously unreleased pieces on a DVD with menus designed by C. Spencer Yeh and artwork by Ledesma himself (limited to 500 copies, first 80 in a Bonus Edition with Mini CD-R of previously unreleased Jefre Cantu-Ledesma material) (Students of Decay) – 2010
- Love Is a Stream LP/CD (Type Records) – 2010
- Love Is a Dream LP/CD (with Xela) (Type Records) – 2010
- Conversations With Myself CD-R (self-released) – 2011
- Faceless Kiss/Blut Mond 7-inch (Emerald Cocoon) – 2012
- Visiting This World LP, art edition (En/Of) – 2012
- Speaking Corpse Cassette (limited to 75 copies, OOP) (Los Discos Enfantasmes) – 2012
- Devotion Digital-Only EP (Shining Skull) – 2013
- Gift of Tongues tape (limited to 100 copies) (Last Foundation) – 2013
- Music From The Headlands Center For The Arts, Volume One – Another Void CD-R (limited to 25 copies) and digital-only edition (Shining Skull) – 2013
- Music From The Headlands Center For The Arts, Volume Two – Disappear CD-R (limited to 25 copies) and digital-only edition (Shining Skull) – 2013
- Music From The Headlands Center For The Arts, Volume Three – Wild River CD-R (limited to 25 copies) and digital-only edition (Shining Skull) – 2013
- Music From The Headlands Center For The Arts, Volume Four – A World Apart CD-R (limited to 25 copies) and digital-only edition (Shining Skull) – 2013
- Music From The Headlands Center For The Arts, Volume Five – The Burnt House CD-R (limited to 25 copies) and digital-only edition (Shining Skull) – 2013
- Music From The Headlands Center For The Arts, Volume Six – Archaic Torso CD-R (limited to 25 copies) and digital-only edition (Shining Skull) – 2013
- Music From The Headlands Center For The Arts, Volume Seven – Gift Of Tongues CD-R (limited to 25 copies) and digital-only edition (Shining Skull) – 2013
- Songs of Remembrance tape (limited to 100 copies) and digital-only edition (Psychic Troubles Tapes) – 2014
- Songs of Forgiveness tape (limited to 100 copies) and digital-only edition (Baro Records) – 2014
- Eternal Spring Digital-only (self-released) – 2014
- A Year with 13 Moons LP (limited to 1,200 copies) (Mexican Summer) – 2015
- In Summer tape (Geographic North) – 2016
- On the Echoing Green LP (Mexican Summer) – 2017
- Tracing Back The Radiance LP (Mexican Summer) – 2019
- Poverty (Boomkat) – 2023
- Gift Songs LP (Mexican Summer) – 2025
- September (Mexican Summer) – 2025
- Procession (self-released) – 2026

=== Félicia Atkinson and Jefre Cantu-Ledesma ===
Collaborative project between Félicia Atkinson and Jefre Cantu-Ledesma.

- Comme Un Seul Narcisse, LP (Shelter Press) – 2016
- Limpid as the Solitudes, EP (Shelter Press) – 2018
- Un Hiver En Plein Été, LP (Shelter Press) – 2021

=== Colophon ===
Ambient solo project.

- Spring 10-inch (Limited, OOP) (Dreams by Degrees) – 2002
- Conduction. Convection. Radiation. CD 3-way split w/ The Wind-Up Bird and 1 Mile North (Music Fellowship) – 2004
- Travels In Constants (Vol. 18): Love Loops CD (Limited, OOP, part of the Travels in Constants CD subscription series) (Temporary Residence Limited) – 2004

=== The Holy See ===
Harsh noise project of Jefre Cantu-Ledesma and Jim Redd.

- Snowing Ash CD-R (Limited to 200 copies, OOP) (Root Strata) – 2005
- The Original Pure Thoughts (Music Your Mind Will Love You) – 2006
- Fucking Physics CD-R (Limited to 100 copies, OOP) (Foxglove) – 2007
- Blood Honey CD-R (Limited to 100 copies, OOP, part of the Arroyo subscription series) (Digitalis) – 2008

=== Sea Zombies ===
Project of Brad Rose (of The North Sea, Ajilvsga, Ossining, Digitalis Records) and John Twells (known as Xela, owner of Type Records) with contributions by Gregg Kowalsky, Jed Bindeman, and Jefre Cantu-Ledesma.

- It Died in Africa Cassette (Two hand-numbered limited editions: 100/50 copies, OOP) (Digitalis Limited) – 2008

=== The Alps ===
Kraut/psych rock band composed of Alexis Georgopoulos, Scott Hewicker and Jefre Cantu-Ledesma.

- Jewelt Galaxies CD-R (Limited to 200 copies, OOP) (Root Strata) – 2005
- Spirit Shambles CD-R (Limited to 150 copies, OOP) (Root Strata) – 2006
- Jewelt Galaxies/Spirit Shambles CD (Spekk) – 2007
- A Path Through the Sun CD-R (Limited to 100 copies, OOP) (Root Strata) – 2008
- A Path Through the Moon CD-R (Limited to 100 copies, OOP) (Root Strata) – 2008
- III CD, LP (Root Strata) – 2008
- Le Voyage CD, LP (Type) – 2010
- Easy Action LP (Mexican Summer) – 2011

=== Moholy-Nagy ===
A heavily synthesizer based and largely improvisational group featuring Jefre Cantu-Ledesma, Danny Paul Grody, and Trevor Montgomery.

- Like Mirage LP/CD (Temporary Residence Limited) – 2011

=== Isidore Ducasse ===
Collaborative project between Jefre Cantu-Ledesma and Trevor Montgomery.

- Isidore Ducasse LP (limited to 400 copies, OOP) (Blackest Rainbow) – 2011

=== Josephine ===
Collaborative project between Jefre Cantu-Ledesma and Tony Cross.

- You Are Perfect Today Cassette (Digitalis Limited) – 2011

=== Raum ===
Collaborative project between Jefre Cantu-Ledesma and Liz Harris (Grouper).

- The Event of Your Leaving LP (Glass, House) – 2013
- Daughter LP (Yellow Electric) – 2022
