= Rüdiger Lorenz =

- Born: September 1, 1941
- Origin: Ingelheim am Rhein
- Died: January 31, 2000 (aged 58)
- Instrument: synthesizer
- Years active: 1960s to 1990s
- Label: Syncord

Rüdiger Lorenz (September 1, 1941 – January 31, 2000) was a German pharmacist and synthesist known for his large collection of analog synthesizers and his prolific output of albums featuring them.

== History ==
Lorenz began his musical education with 5 years of piano lessons as a child, followed by playing guitar in local beat-bands in the 1960s. He became interested in electronic music when listening to records using the Moog synthesizer at the end of the 1960s. In 1972, he built his first Wersi organ, followed by various amplifiers and effects boxes. In 1977, he constructed his first synthesizer from an Elektor Formant kit. By the time of his death Lorenz's collection included 38 synthesizers, including three large self-built modular ones. In an interview with SYN fanzine he said his favorite instruments were Korg Polysix, Roland TR-808 and Roland Vocoder.

He was one of the pioneers of the DIY movement, not only building his own synthesizers and effects but creating and distributing his own music label, Syncord Records.

After his death, the copyright was transferred to his son Tim Lorenz, who is DJ (Superdefekt/sdfkt.) and, just like his father, produces synthesizer-based electronic music. Furthermore, he has been part of the Andreas Dorau Liveband since 2005.

== Discography ==
- 1981 Queen of Saba (cassette)
- 1982 Silver Steps (cassette)
- 1982 Wonderflower (cassette)
- 1983 Invisible Voices (LP)
- 1983 Earthrise (compilation)
- 1983 International Friendship (compilation with several other artists)(LP)
- 1984 Southland (LP)
- 1985 The last secret of Poseidon (LP)
- 1987 Angaria (LP)
- 1988 Morning of the world (LP)
- 1990 Fata Morgana
- 1992 Pazifica
- 1992 Atoll
- 1993 Coral Sea
- 1993 Distant Blue (compilation with Stefan Reinert, Wilfried Müller, Michael Rauch)
- 1994 Sibiria
- 1995 Taklamakan
- 1996 Congo
- 1997 Ozeana
- 1997 Personal Spirits 2 (compilation)
- 1998 Tropica
- 2015 The Syntape Years 1981-1983 (compilation)

=== Tracks appear on ===
- 1984 On-slaught No.5
- 1991 Syntonic Waves
- 1992 Syntonic Waves, Vol.2
- 1993 Syntonic Waves, Vol.3
- 1993 Tontraeger Fuer Synapsen Massage 01-02
- 1994 Syntonic Waves, Vol.4
- 1995 Syntonic Waves, Vol.5
- 1995 Schwingungen Radio Auf CD Nr. 7
- 1995 TFSM 01
- 1996 Syntonic Waves, Vol.6
- 1996 Mysterious Neighbour - The Mars Project Vol. II
- 1998 Schwingungen Radio Auf CD Nr. 40
- 1999 Schwingungen Radio Auf CD Nr. 45
- 2009 Electrounique Vol. 5
