= The Intelligence =

American rock band

- The Intelligence performing in 2009. L-R: Lars Finberg (guitar, vocals), Beren Ekine-Huet (drums), Susanna Welbourne (keyboard)

Background information
- Origin: Seattle
- Genres: Post-punk; garage rock; garage punk
- Years active: 1999–present
- Labels: Dragnet; In the Red; Dirtnap; S-S; Plastic Idol
- Members: Lars Finberg; Dave Hernandez; Drew Church; Kaanan Tupper
- Past members: Chris Woodhouse; Lee Reader; Nicholas Brawley; Matthew Ford; Petey Dammit; Pete Capponi

The Intelligence is an American rock band from Seattle, formed in 1999. Founded by multi-instrumentalist Lars Finberg (A Frames, Thee Oh Sees), the band currently consists of Finberg, alongside Dave Hernandez (guitar), Drew Church (bass) and Kaanan Tupper (drums).

To date, the band has released nine studio albums, two EPs and a number of singles, the latter often split with other artists.

== Biography ==
The Intelligence was formed by Lars Finberg. Since the late 1990s Finberg played in other bands with vocalist/guitarist Erin Sullivan, and bassist Min Yee (the Dipers, Unnatural Helpers).

A-Frames and the Intelligence started in 1999. Both acts released singles on Dragnet Records, the indie label Finberg runs with A-Frames members Erin Sullivan and Min Yee.

The Intelligence's first release was a 5 track 7-inch EP entitled Girlfriends and Boyfriends on Dragnet Records in 2000. Three years later, two tracks featured on a split 7-inch with the Popular Shapes on Dirtnap Records. This was followed by the two track "Test" 7-inch on S-S Records in 2003. The following year, Finberg recorded some songs at home and with other musicians that were released on their debut album Boredom And Terror. It was released as vinyl with an extra CD, the latter tracks were re-released on vinyl by Polly Maggoo in 2006. After their debut, The Intelligence got signed to In the Red Records who released their second album Icky Baby in 2005. In 2006 the four-track EP Boys Annoy 12-inch was released.

The band opened two shows for The Fall at CMJ. The Intelligence first toured in Europe in 2006.

Country Teasers bassist Kaanan Tupper joined the band supporting the 2007 LP, Deuteronomy.

In 2009, the band released Fake Surfers, featuring a number of guest vocalists and produced by Mike McHugh. They also released Crepuscule With Pacman on the French label Born Bad Records.

Towards the end of the decade, Finberg had moved away from lo-fi recordings made by himself to studio-productions. In 2010, the band released their seventh album, Males. It was recorded with Karate Party/FM Knives guitarist, Chris Woodhouse who joined The Intelligence as a second guitarist. It was followed in 2012 with Everybody’s Got It Easy But Me.

In 2014, the record company re-released both the debut album Boredom and Terror and the content of the original bonus CD on vinyl. In 2015, the band released Vintage Future, and toured as support to FFS in September/October.

== Members ==
Current members

- Lars Finberg - vocals and guitar, drums, keyboards, drum machine (1999–present)
- Dave Hernandez - guitar (2003; 2011–present)
- Drew Church - bass guitar
- Kaanan Tupper - drums

Former members

- Chris Woodhouse - guitar (Karate Party, FM Knives)
- Calvin Lee Reader - guitar (Popular Shapes, Private Beach)
- Nicholas Brawley - bass guitar (Popular Shapes, Roommates)
- Matthew Ford - drums (Factums, Love Tan-formerly Pyramids, Yves/Son/Ace, Evening Meetings, Dream Salon)
- Kurt Prutsman - guitar (The Professional Man)
- Shannon McConnell - bass (The Fall-Outs, Pulses)
- Dean Whitmore - drums (Unnatural Helpers, Idle Times)
- Dave Ramm - drums (Pulses, Scraps)
- Jed Maheu - bass (Unnatural Helpers, Zig Zags)
- Susannah Welbourne (keyboards)
- Beren Ekine-Huett (drums)
- Pete Capponi - drums
- TV Coahran - guitar, keyboards (Popular Shapes, Holy Ghost Revival, Gazebos)
- Megan Welbourne Lunz - keyboards
- Eric Lunz - guitar
- Petey Dammit - guitar (2014-2015)

== Discography ==
Studio albums

- Boredom and Terror (2004)
- Icky Baby (2005)
- Deuteronomy (2007)
- Fake Surfers (2009)
- Crepuscule with Pacman (2009)
- Males (2010)
- Everybody’s Got It Easy But Me (2012)
- Vintage Future (2015)
- Un-Psychedelic in Peavey City (2019)

EPs

- Girlfriends and Boyfriends (2000)
- Let's Toil (2006)
- Boys Annoy (2007)

Singles

- Test/Bird Call 7-inch (S-S Records, 2004)
- I'm Your Taxi/No Nurses/If I Had A Hammer 7-inch (Holy Cobra Society, 2006)
- Message Of Love/Leopard Skin Pill Box Hat 7-inch (Disordered Records/Lo-Fi Records, 2007)
- Debt & ESP/Chateau Bandit 7-inch (Plastic Idol Records, 2008)
- Fido, Your Leash Is Too Long/Shitty World (Plastic Idol Records, 2008)
- What Wine Goes With Eggs?/Sixteen & Seventeen (April 77 Records, 2008)
- Reading and Writing About Partying/Like Like Like Like Like Like Like 7-inch (Raw Deluxe Records, 2009)

Splits

- split 7-inch with Popular Shapes (Dirtnap Records, 2003)
- split 12-inch EP with The Ohsees (MT. ST. MNT., 2008)
- split 7-inch with [(Coachwhips)] (Omnibus Records)
- split 7-inch with Crash Normal (Compost Modern Art, 2009)
- split 7-inch with Unnatural Helpers (Dirty Knobby, 2009)

Compilations appearances

- "The Beat Goes On" on The Necessary Effect, Screamers Songs Interpreted (Extravertigo Recordings/Xeroid Records, 2003)
- "The Universe" on Dirtnap Across The Northwest, (Dirtnap Records, 2003)
- "Spies Like Us" on Babyhead LP, (S-S Records, 2004)
- "Tropical Signal" on Static Disaster The U.K. In The Red Records Sampler CD, (In The Red, 2005)
- "Secret Signals" on Subbacultcha! LP, (Gonzo Circus, Subbacultcha!, 2008)
- "Partman Parthorse" on The Funhouse Comp Thing II CD (My Fat Ass Productions, 2008)
- "Conference Call" on Puget Power 5 (Regal Select, 2009)
- "The Beetles" on The World's Lousy With Ideas Volume 8 (Almost Ready Records, 2009)

AFCGT (A Frames Climax Golden Twins)

- AFCGT CD-R
- AFCGT 10-inch EP, Sub Pop, 2008
