= Emma Kohlmann =

American artist

Emma Kohlmann (born 1989) is an artist based in Western Massachusetts. Her work ranges from drawing and painting to zines, digital art, books and various media. Her primary focus is usually in working with ink and watercolor.

== Background and education ==
Kohlmann grew up in the neighborhood of Riverdale in the Bronx, New York.She often drew as a child and was a ballet dancer until her senior year of high school, when, after working with Alvin Ailey American Dance Theater, she decided to leave dance. Kohlmann attended Hampshire College in Amherst, MA, where she received her Bachelor of Arts degree. There she studied subjects such as philosophy and feminist theory.

After completing her undergraduate education, Kohlmann began creating zines, which were published with the help of personal friends and acquaintances. In an interview with Amadeus Magazine in 2018, Kohlmann explained the personal nature of her artwork, and cited her home in Florence, MA as a place dominated by liberal ideas and activism which have informed her work. She is able to produce a large and growing volume of work because of the nature of the media she works with.

During spring 2020 Kohlmann took part in the Pennsylvania Academy of Fine Arts's Visiting Artists program.

== Art and published work ==
=== Exhibitions and shows ===
Listed below are some of Kohlmann's exhibitions, both as a solo artist and as part of various groups.

==== Solo exhibitions ====
- I Have Considered the Lilies, Chandran Gallery in San Francisco, CA, (2020)
- Emma Kohlmann, Jack Hanley Gallery, New York, NY (2018)
- Sun Spots, Nationale Gallery in Portland, OR (2018)
- Secret Flower, Kit Gallery, Tokyo, Japan, (2016)

==== Group exhibitions ====
- Spiritual Art Advisory, Spring Break Art Fair, New York (2019)
- Maiden Form, Andrew Edlin Gallery, New York (2018)
- Group Exhibition, Art Herning, V1 Gallery, Herning, Denmark (2017)

Kohlmann has designed a series of illustrations for at least six Vogue articles published in succession in early 2020. Also in early 2020, the Santa Barbara Museum of Art acquired a work of Kohlmann's for its permanent collection. Sundrop Cactus also appeared on tickets to the 2017 NY Book Fair.
