= Xela (musician) =

British electronic musician

John Twells, known by the alias Xela, is a British electronic music artist, from Walsall, who currently lives in Berlin. They run the record label Type Records.

Their earlier music combines constructed beats, smart melodies and brittle electronica, which is supplemented by guitar and other instrumentation in later recordings. An obsession with horror soundtracks, particularly from the films of Dario Argento, Umberto Lenzi and Lucio Fulci and the music of Goblin and Fabio Frizzi, has influenced them to produce more atmospheric soundscapes encompassing folk, drone, and psychedelia. Their album In Bocca Al Lupo fused this style with the doom and noise of Wolf Eyes and Sunn O))) to produce discomforting and loud funereal music. This album, composed of four long tracks, was originally conceived as a single piece, and is inspired by darker themes from Christian dogma and mythology. Since their transition away from IDM, beat driven electronics, beginning with The Dead Sea, Xela's rate of release has increased significantly.

== Albums ==
- For Frosty Mornings and Summer Nights (2003)
- Tangled Wool (2004)
- The Dead Sea (2006)
- Heirs of the Fire (2008)
- In Bocca al Lupo (2008)
- Never, Better (2008)
- The Illuminated (2008) (as "Χελα")
- The Divine (2009)
- The Sublime (2010)
- My Memories of Gallifrey (2011)
- Exorcism (2011)
- Twells and Christensen (CD and LP collaboration with Matt Christiansen of Zelienople)

Xela has contributed remixes to

- Gareth Hardwick - Aversions (CD)
- Yellow Moon Band - Remixes (LP)
- Soccer Committee + Machinefabriek - Remixes (CD)
