= Tarentel (band) =

American post-rock band

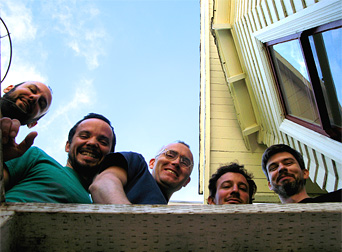
- From left to right: Tony Cross, Jefre Cantu-Ledesma, Paul Clipson, Danny Grody, Jim Redd

Background information
- Origin: San Francisco
- Genres: Post-rock; experimental; noise
- Years active: 1995–2009
- Labels: Temporary Residence Limited, Root Strata, Music Fellowship, Digitalis Industries, Awkward Silence, Jonathan Whiskey, Static Caravan, Geographic North, Acuarela Discos, En/Of, Staalplaat, Three Lobed, Type Records, Resonant
- Members: Jefre Cantu-Ledesma; Danny Grody; Jim Redd
- Past members: Paul Clipson; John Hughes; Trevor Montgomery; Patricia Kavanaugh; Kenseth Thibideau; Jeffrey Rosenberg; Tony Cross; Steve Dye
- Website: www.tarentel.com

Tarentel is a post-rock band which formed in San Francisco in 1995. Initially, the band consisted of Danny Grody and Jefre Cantu-Ledesma. The line-up altered over the years and has included John Hughes, Trevor Montgomery, Patricia Kavanaugh, Kenseth Thibideau, Jeffrey Rosenberg, Jim Redd, Tony Cross, Steve Dye and others.

Tarentel began as a post-rock band, making extended, LP-side-length instrumental pieces. Over the course of three full-length albums and a number of singles and EPs, they gradually shifted their style to a looser, more improvisational form that incorporated genres such as noise and drone as well as having a strong psychedelic element.

Tarentel member Paul Clipson projected original Super-8 film compositions to accompany each live performance by the band. He died in February 2018. The band has been inactive at least since their most recent release in 2009.

== Discography ==
=== Studio albums ===
- From Bone to Satellite (1999) (limited to 1000 copies)
- The Order of Things (2001) (vinyl limited to 500 copies)
- Mort aux Vaches (2002) (limited to 1000 copies)
- We Move Through Weather (2004)

=== EPs ===
- Tarentel (1998)
- Travels in Constants vol. 3 (1999) (limited to 1000 copies) (part of the Travels in Constants series)
- When We Almost Killed Ourselves (1999) (limited to 200 copies)
- Looking for Things / Searching for Things (2000) (limited to 500 copies)
- Two Sides of Myself (2000) (limited to 500 copies)
- Carol Whiskey 9 (2000) (limited to 250 copies) (split with Rothko)
- Sets and Rises / Rises and Sets (2000) (limited to 500 copies) (split with Lilienthal)
- Fear of Bridges (2002) (limited to 700 copies)
- Latency (2003) (limited to 100 copies)
- Paper White (2005)
- Big Black Square (2005)
- Ghost Weight (2005)
- Paper White / Big Black Square (2005)
- Home Ruckus (2005) (limited to 500 copies)
- Home Ruckus: Double-Sided Air (2007) (limited to 500 copies)
- Home Ruckus: Bottled Smoke (2007) (limited to 100 copies)
- Ghetto Beats On the Surface of the Sun (2007)
- You Can't Hide Your Love Forever Vol. 3: Space Junk (2009) (limited to 300 copies, part of the You Can't Hide Your Love Forever 7-inch subscription series)

=== Compilations ===
- Ephemera | Singles 99-00 (2002)

=== Live albums ===
- Live Edits: Natoma CD (2006) (limited to 500 copies)
- Ghetto Beats On the Surface of the Sun (2006) (limited to 500 copies of each)
- Live Edits: Italy & Switzerland (2008) (limited to 500 copies)

=== DVDs ===
- Over Water (2009) (DVD-r collaboration with filmmaker Paul Clipson, three shorts of Super8 film and music mostly culled from live performances in Italy & Switzerland in 2005, limited to 100 copies)
