= Alexis Georgopoulos =

American artist, music producer and DJ

Alexis Georgopoulos (born 1974), who often records under the name Arp, is an American electronic musician, composer, and music producer based in New York.

== Biography ==
Georgopoulos has pursued a diverse range of styles as a solo artist (Arp) and as a collaborator (Alexis Georgopoulos & Jefre Cantu-Ledesma, The Alps, Masks, and Tussle.

His background in Ethnomusicology—with an emphasis on non-Western folk traditions and avant-garde electronic music—has formed the basis from which much of his diverse work, combining disparate musical genres, stems. His work has been released by labels such as RVNG Intl, Smalltown Supersound, Mexican Summer, Type, Beats In Space, Emotional Rescue, Geographic North, Root Strata, and Opal Tapes.

Georgopoulos has worked with figures from a range of disciplines including visual artists Tauba Auerbach and Darren Bader, the filmmaker Paul Clipson, the choreographers Jonah Bokaer and Brittany Bailey.

As a solo artist and as a collaborator, his work has been presented in group exhibitions, museums, on stage and in cinemas internationally, including MoMA PS1, BAM, The Kitchen, Deitch Projects, Walker Art Center, White Columns, MoMA, 303 Gallery, and New Museum.

He is also a published writer on art, music and design. Interview subjects have included Alice Coltrane, Peter Saville, Kodwo Eshun, Suzanne Ciani, the band Broadcast, among others.

== Discography ==
=== Albums and EPs as Arp ===
- In Light (Smalltown Supersound, 2008)
- The Soft Wave (Smalltown Supersound, 2010)
- More (Smalltown Supersound, 2013)
- Pulsars e Quasars (Mexican Summer, 2014) – 7 track EP
- Inversions (Geographic North, 2016) – cassette; edition of 100 copies
- ZEBRA (Mexican Summer, 2018)
- Ensemble – Live! (Mexican Summer, 2019) – music from Zebra performed live in studio, plus four new tracks
- Black Plum (Mexican Summer, 2020)
- New Pleasures (Mexican Summer, 2022)
- The Enormous Room (Longform Editions, 2023)

=== Albums with one other ===
- FRKWYS Vol.3 (RVNG Intl., 2010) – Arp with Anthony Moore
- Fragments of a Season (Emotional Rescue, 2017) – with Jefre Cantu-Ledesma; as Alexis Georgopoulos

=== EPs as part of Masks ===
- Masks Food plus Drug (II) (Opal Tapes, 2014)
- Masks EP2 (Spring Theory, 2019)

=== Albums as part of The Alps ===
- Jewelt Galaxies (Root Strata, 2005)
- III (Type, 2008)
- Le Voyage (Type, 2010)
- Easy Action (Mexican Summer, 2011)

=== Albums and EPs as part of Tussle ===
- VA : Frisco Styles (Jack Hanley/Rainbow Records, 2003)
- Eye Contact 12" (Troubleman Unlimited, 2003)
- Don't Stop EP (Troubleman Unlimited, 2004)
- Here It Comes (Troubleman Unlimited, 2004)
- Kling Klang (Troubleman Unlimited, 2004)
- Telescope Mind (Smalltown Supersound, 2006)
- The Sound of White Columns (The Sound of White Columns, 2006)
- Warning (Smalltown Supersound, 2007)
