= Sobrenadar =

Paula Garcia
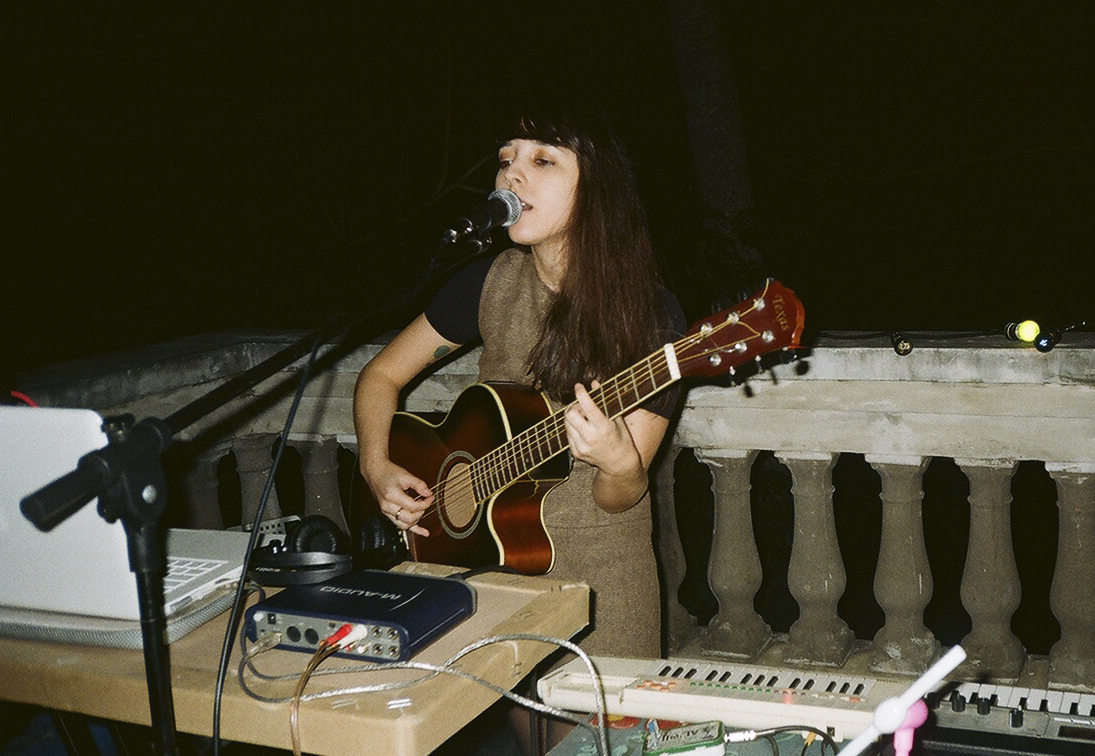
- Sobrenadar live

Background information
- Also known as: Sobrenadar
- Born: 29 February 1988 (age 38)
- Origin: Argentina
- Genres: dream pop, ambient, electronic, chillwave
- Occupation: Singer-songwriter
- Years active: 2008–present

"Sobrenadar" is Paula Garcia's solo project. Paula Garcia is an Argentinean singer and songwriter.

== Biography ==
Born on 29 February 1988 Resistencia, Chaco (in northern Argentina).

In 2006, she moved to Buenos Aires and began to study music production at the Escuela de Musica de Buenos Aires. Two years later Paula moved back home and starting recording songs in her bedroom studio which have been self-described like ‘watery music’. She blends together reverby beats, electronic elements, soft guitars, and voice whispering to create "aquatic" Dream Pop tunes that give the impression of listening underwater.

The track "Sommeil Paradoxal" has been included in a compilation "Así suena el verano", released through the publication Indie Hoy (Argentina). The song "Esmerilado" was put in Weekly Magic Tape #27 of Magic magazine (France).

== Discography ==
=== Albums ===
- Sobrenadar (November 2010)
- 1859 (March 2012)
- Tres (March 2014)

=== EPs ===
- "Vent Solaire" (July 2011)
- "Guam" (cassette, 15") (Magic Rub, USA label) (October 2011)
- "Alucinari" (cassette, 15") (Magic Rub, USA label) (July 2013)
