= Mike Donovan (musician) =

American guitarist and singer

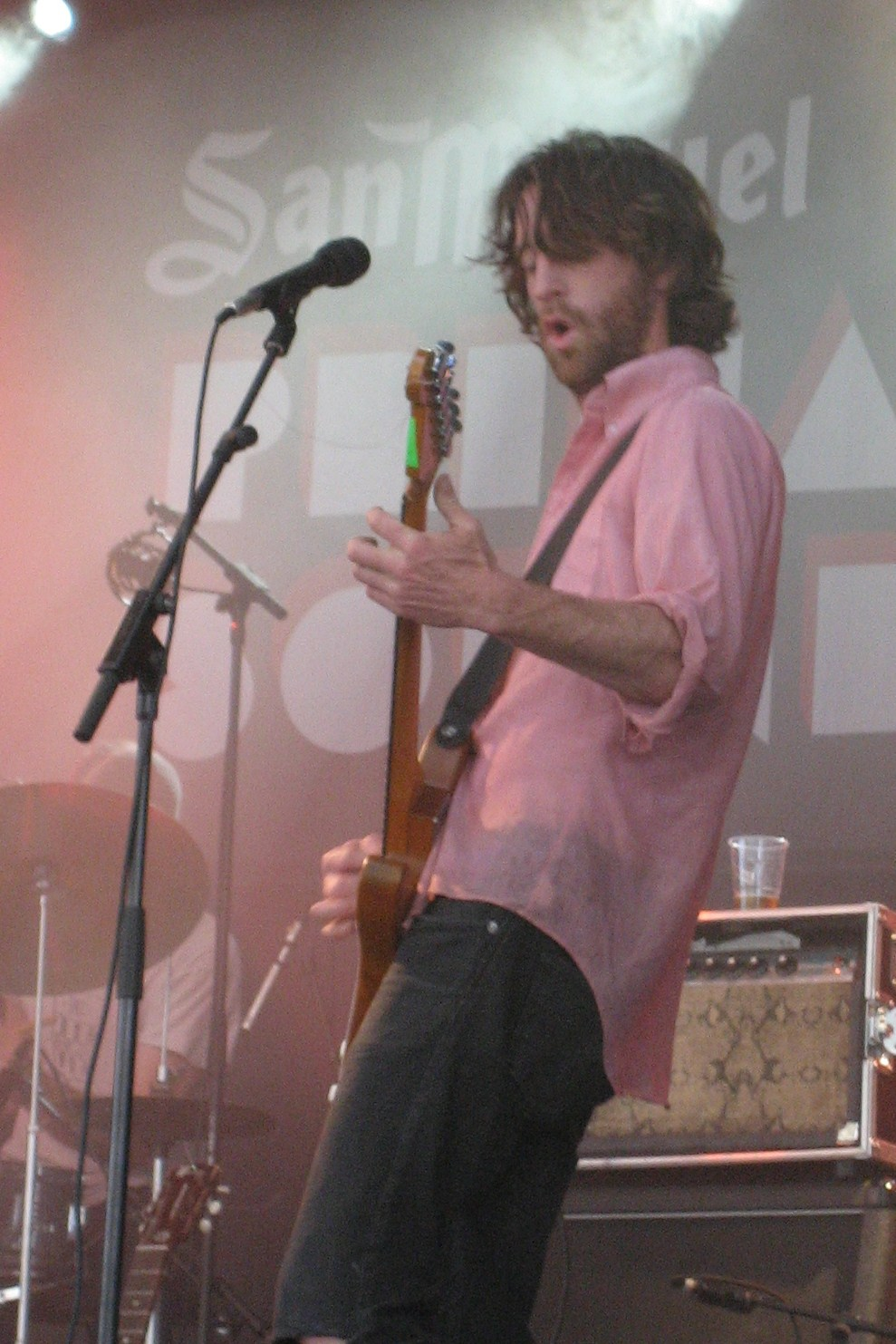
- Mike Donovan performing with Sic Alps at the Primavera Festival in Barcelona 2010

Background information
- Born: October 6, 1971 (age 54)
- Origin: San Francisco, California, United States
- Genres: Garage rock, psychedelic rock, alternative rock, lo-fi, noise rock, art punk, post-punk
- Years active: 1991–present
- Labels: Dial Records, Drag City, Folding Cassette Records,
- Website: Official Website

Mike Donovan (born October 6, 1971) is an American, San Francisco, California based musician, best known as the guitarist and singer of Sic Alps (2004–2013). He has also released music by other San Francisco musicians with his Dial Records and Folding Cassettes labels.

Donovan is a veteran of several other bands. He was a member of The Ropers, The Church Steps with Chris Douglas, NAM, Big Techno Werewolves, Sounds of the Barbary Coast and Yikes.

In October 2013, he released his solo debut Wot on Drag City.

In May 2015, Donovan formed the San Francisco lo-fi supergroup The Peacers, releasing a self-titled debut on July 17, 2015. The self-titled album was co-produced and co-performed by Ty Segall. The current lineup of The Peacers is Mike Donovan, Shayde Sartin, Mike Shoun and Bo Moore. The band release their second record, Introducing The Crimsmen, on Drag City on June 16, 2017.

== Discography ==
- Wot (Drag City, 2013)
- How To Get Your Record Played In Shops (Drag City, 2018)
- Exurbian Quonset (Drag City, 2019)
