= Ty Segall discography =

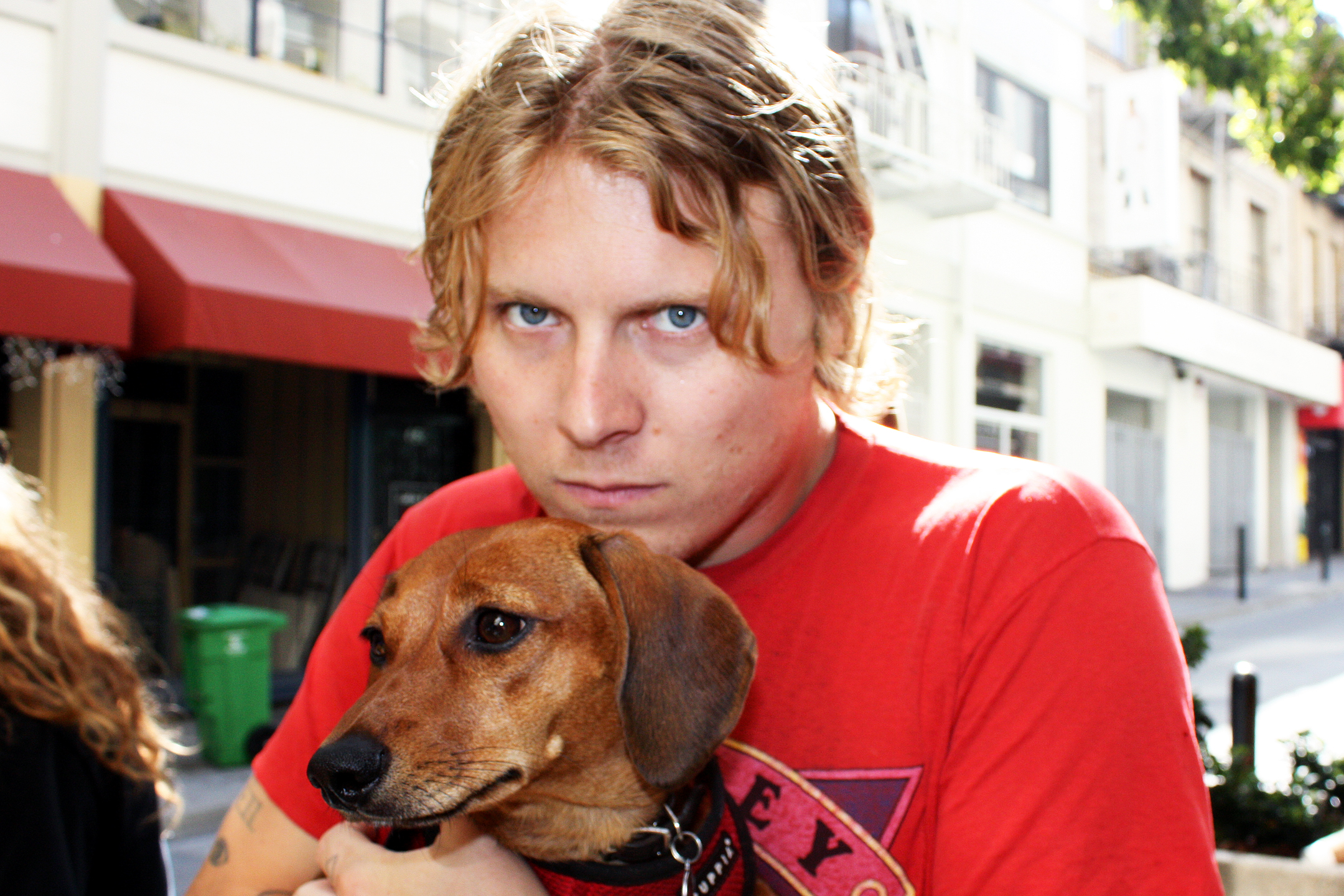
- Studio albums: 17
- EPs: 3
- Live albums: 2
- Compilation albums: 4
- Singles: 19
- Music videos: 16

American garage rock musician Ty Segall has released seventeen studio albums, two live albums, four compilation albums, three extended plays (EPs), nineteen singles, and sixteen music videos. He has also recorded as a member of various other bands.

== Albums ==
=== Studio albums ===
Title	Details	Peak positions						
Title	Details	US	US Indie	BEL (Fl)	BEL (Wa)	FRA	NED	UK
Ty Segall	Released: 2008; Label: Burger (cassette) / Castle Face (LP); Formats: Cassette/LP	—	—	—	—	—	—	—
Lemons	Released: July 14, 2009; Label: Goner Records; Formats: CD/LP	—	—	—	—	—	—	—
Melted	Released: June 15, 2010; Label: Goner; Formats: CD/LP	—	—	—	—	—	—	—
Goodbye Bread	Released: June 20, 2011; Label: Drag City; Formats: CD/LP	—	—	—	—	—	—	—
Slaughterhouse (as Ty Segall Band)	Released: June 26, 2012; Label: In The Red Records; Formats: CD/LP	—	—	—	—	—	—	—
Twins	Released: October 9, 2012; Label: Drag City; Formats: Cassette/CD/LP	—	—	—	—	—	—	—
Sleeper	Released: August 24, 2013; Label: Drag City; Formats: Cassette/CD/LP	—	43	153	151	—	—	—
Manipulator	Released: August 25, 2014; Label: Drag City; Formats: Cassette/CD/LP	45	10	60	43	101	48	73
Emotional Mugger	Released: January 22, 2016; Label: Drag City; Formats: Cassette/CD/LP	136	6	127	132	—	—	—
Ty Segall	Released: January 27, 2017; Label: Drag City; Formats: Cassette/CD/LP	143	10	129	100	159	—	—
Freedom's Goblin	Released: January 26, 2018; Label: Drag City; Formats: Cassette/CD/LP	117	6	63	199	—	124	73
First Taste	Released: August 2, 2019; Label: Drag City; Formats: Cassette/CD/LP	—	13	—	—	—	—	—
Harmonizer	Released: August 3, 2021; Label: Drag City; Formats: Cassette/CD/LP	—	—	—	—	—	—	—
Hello, Hi	Released: July 22, 2022; Label: Drag City; Formats: CD/LP/digital	—	—	—	—	—	—	—
Three Bells	Released: January 26, 2024; Label: Drag City; Formats: LP/CD/digital	—	—	—	—	—	—	—
Love Rudiments	Released: August 30, 2024; Label: Drag City; Formats: LP/Cassette/digital	—	—	—	—	—	—	—
Possession	Released: May 30, 2025; Label: Drag City; Formats: LP/CD/Cassette/digital	—	—	—	—	—	—	—
Chrome	Released: August 28, 2026; Label: Drag City; Formats: LP/CD/Cassette/digital	—	—	—	—	—	—	—

=== Other albums ===
- Horn the Unicorn (Original Release) – Cassette (2008; Wizard Mountain)
- Halfnonagon (split with Superstitions) – Cassette (2008; Wizard Mountain)
- Swag / Sitting in the Back of a Morris Marina Parked at the Pier Eating Sandwiches Whilst The Rain Drums on the Roof (split with Black Time) – LP (2009; Telephone Explosion Records)
- Horn the Unicorn (Re-release with Addition Tracks) – LP (2009; HBSP-2X)
- Ty Segall & Lemons – Cassette (2010; Burger Records)
- $ingles – Cassette (2010; Psychic Snerts)
- San Francisco Rock Compilation or Food or Weird Beer From Microsoft – Limited Release, only 350 copies made – Cassette/LP (2010; God? Records issued cassette only / 2011; Social Music Records issued LP only)
- Live in Aisle Five – LP (2011; Southpaw Records)
- Singles 2007–2010 – Double LP/CD (2011; Goner Records)
- Gemini (Demo version of Twins) – LP (2013; Drag City; Sea Note)
- $INGLE$ 2 – LP, CD, cassette, MP3/FLAC digital download (2014; Drag City)
- Live in San Francisco (as Ty Segall Band) – LP, CD, MP3 (2015; Drag City)
- Ty Rex (2015; Goner Records)
- Fudge Sandwich - CD/LP (2018; In The Red Records)
- Orange Rainbow - Cassette (2018; God? Records)
- Deforming Lobes (as Ty Segall and Freedom Band) – LP, CD, Cassette, MP3 (2019; Drag City)
- Pig Man Lives Volume 1 - 4xLP (2019; Sea Note)
- "Segall Smeagol" EP (2020)
- Whirlybird - soundtrack album to Whirlybird (2022; Drag City)

== Collaborative studio albums ==
Title	Details	Peak positions	
Title	Details	BEL (Fl)	BEL (Wa)
Reverse Shark Attack (with Mikal Cronin)	Released: 2009; Label: Burger Records/Kill Shaman Records; Formats: Cassette/LP	—	—
Hair (with White Fence)	Released: April 24, 2012; Label: Drag City; Formats: CD/LP	—	—
Joy (with White Fence)	Released: July 20, 2018; Label: Drag City; Formats: Cassette/CD/LP	113	167

=== Other releases ===
- Pop Song (with Mikal Cronin) – 7" (2009; Goodbye Boozy Records)
- Group Flex (with Mikal Cronin) - Compilation contribution, tracks 'Fame' and 'Suffragette City', 6 x Flexi Disc/Book (2011; Castle Face)

== Singles and EPs ==
- Skin – 7" (2008; Goodbye Boozy Records)
- It – 7" (2008; Chocolate Covered Records)
- Cents – 7" (2009; Goner Records)
- Universal Momma – 7" (2009; True Panther)
- My Sunshine – 7" (2009; Trouble in Mind)
- The Drag / Maria Stacks (split with Thee Oh Sees) – 7" (2009; Castle Face)
- Caesar – 7" (2010; Goner Records)
- 4 Way Split (split with CoCoComa, The White Wires, & Charlie and The Moonhearts) – 7" (2010; Trouble in Mind)
- GonerFest Seven Golden Ticket Record (split with Armitage Shanks, UV Race, & Strapping Field Hands) – 7" (2010; Goner Records)
- Diamond Way / My Head Explodes (split with JEFF the Brotherhood) – 7" (2010; Infinity Cat Recordings)
- Bruise Cruise Vol. 1 (split with Thee Oh Sees) – 7" (2010; Bruise Cruise Records)
- Ty Rex EP – 12" (2011; Goner Records)
- I Can't Feel It – 7" (2011; Drag City)
- Spiders – 7" (2011; Drag City)
- Tour Split (split with Feeling of Love) – 7" (2012; Permanent Records)
- The Hill – 7" (2012; Drag City)
- Would You Be My Love? – 7" (2013; Drag City)
- Ty Rex II EP – 7" (2013; Goner Records)
- Music From a Film 1 (split with Chad & The Meatbodies) – 7" (2013; Famous Class Records)
- Feel – 7" (2014; Drag City)
- Motörhead / Paranoid – 7" (2014; Drag City) - as Ty Segall Band
- Mr. Face EP – 7" (2015; Famous Class Records)
- Sentimental Goblin EP - 7" (2017; Suicide Squeeze Records)
- Fried Shallots EP - 12" (2017; Drag City)
- Alta / Meaning (2017; Drag City)
- She's a Beam (2020; Drag City) - with Cory Hanson
- "Live" "At" "The" "BBC" (2026; Sea Note)
- Love Fuzzz EP (2026; Drag City)

== Compilation appearances ==
- Yeti Eight (Contributes Tracks: 2 – Lovely One (Demo)& 16 – I Think I've Had It) – CD (2009; Yeti Publishing LLC)
- Our Boy Roy (Contributes Track: Pretty Woman) – LP (2010; Telephone Explosion Records)
- In a Cloud: New Sounds of San Francisco (Contributes Track: Hey Big Mouth) – LP (2010; Secret Seven Records)
- Stuffs Vol. 1 (Contributes Track: Flys Better) – LP (2010; Compost Modern Art Recordings)
- Live At The Empty Bottle (Contributes Track: Girlfriend (live)) – LP (2012; Shimby Presents)
- Live at Death By Audio 2012 (Contributes Track: Imaginary Person (live)) – 7" Flexi Book (2013; Famous Class Records)

== Music videos ==
- Cents (2009)
- Lovely One (2009)
- Pretty Baby (You're So Ugly) (2010)
- Girlfriend (2011)
- Goodbye Bread (2011)
- Where Your Head Goes (2011)
- My Head Explodes (2012)
- The Hill (2012)
- Thank God for Sinners (2013)
- Fuzz's Fourth Dream (2013)
- The Man Man (2013)
- Manipulator (2014)
- The Singer (2014)
- Emotional Mugger (2016)
- Candy Sam (2016)
- Californian Hills (2016)
- Break a Guitar (2017)
- Taste (2019)

== As a member of other bands ==
=== Epsilons ===
- Evil Robots – CD/EP (2005, Modern Sleeze)
- Epsilons / Hips (split with Hips) – 7" (2006; olFactory Records)
- Epsilons – CD/LP (2006; Retard Disco issued CD only / Young Cubs issued LP only)
- Killed 'Em Deader 'N A Six Card Poker Hand – CD/LP (2007; Retard Disco issued CD only / HBSP-2X issued LP only)

=== Party Fowl ===
- Scum Fuck Revolt: A GG Allin Tribute compilation (Contributes Track: Die When You Die) – CD (2006; Husk Records)
- Washed Shores compilation (Contributes Track: Portage 53) – Cassette (200?; Seafoam Records)
- Party Fowl – 7" (2008; Post Present Medium)
- STD's – 7" (2008; Goodbye Boozy Records)

=== The Traditional Fools ===
- The Primate Five vs The Traditional Fools (split with The Primate Five) – 7" (2007; Goodbye Boozy Records)
- The Traditional Fools – 7" (2007; Chocolate Covered Records)
- The Traditional Fools – LP (2008; Wizard Mountain/Make A Mess Records)

=== The Perverts ===
- The Perverts – 7" (2009; HBSP-2X)

=== Sic Alps ===
- "Breadhead" – 7" (2011; Drag City Records)

=== Fuzz ===
- This Time I Got A Reason/Fuzz's Fourth Dream – 7" (2012, Trouble In Mind)
- Sleigh Ride/You Won't See Me – 7" (2013, In the Red)
- Live in San Francisco EP – 12" (2013, Castle Face Records)
- Fuzz (2013, In the Red)
- Sunderberry Dream/21st Century Schizoid Man – 7" (2013, In the Red)
- "Till the End of the Day" (Kinks cover) – 7" (2014, Famous Class)
- II – (2015, In the Red)
- III - (2020, In the Red)

=== GØGGS ===
- GØGGS - LP (2016, In the Red)
- Pre Strike Sweep - LP (2018, In the Red)

=== The C.I.A ===
- The C.I.A Demo – Cassette (2018, Self-Released)
- The C.I.A – LP (2018, In the Red)
- Surgery Channel – LP (2023, In the Red)

=== Wasted Shirt ===
- Fungus II - LP (2020, Famous Class)

=== Freckle ===
- Freckle - LP (2025, GOD?)

== Other appearances ==
with Dave Davies

- "Livin' in the Past" (2013)
