= MCII =

MCII may refer to:

- 1102 in Roman numerals
- MCII (album), Studio album by Mikal Cronin
- Midnight Club II, a racing video game
- Mental contrasting with implementation intentions, a behavioral psychological intervention by Gabriele Oettingen
