= Ty Segall (2017 album) =

Studio album by Ty Segall

Studio album by Ty Segall
- Released: January 27, 2017
- Genres: Psychedelic rock; hard rock; garage rock
- Length: 36:06
- Label: Drag City
- Producer: Steve Albini

Ty Segall chronology
Emotional Mugger (2016)	Ty Segall (2017)	Freedom's Goblin (2018)

Professional ratings
Aggregate scores
Source	Rating
AnyDecentMusic?	7.7/10
Metacritic	82/100
Review scores
Source	Rating
AllMusic	4/5 stars
American Songwriter	4/5 stars
The Guardian	3/5 stars
The Line of Best Fit	8/10
NME	4/5 stars
Mojo	4/5 stars
Pitchfork	8.0/10
Record Collector	3/5 stars
The Skinny	5/5 stars
Uncut	8/10

Ty Segall is the ninth studio album by American garage rock musician Ty Segall, released on January 27, 2017, on Drag City Records. Recorded with engineer Steve Albini, it is Segall's second self-titled studio album, following the release of his debut in 2008.

Preceded by the single, "Orange Color Queen", the album was recorded with a full backing band, consisting of regular collaborators, Mikal Cronin (bass), Charles Moothart (drums) and Emmett Kelly (guitar), alongside Ben Boye (piano). Following the album's release, the band became known as The Freedom Band.

== Background and recording ==
Following the release of his eighth studio album, Emotional Mugger (2016), Segall formed The Muggers, a high concept backing band, to tour in support of the release. After the tour's completion, Segall retained both Mikal Cronin (bass) and Emmett Kelly (guitar) to begin work on a ninth studio album, with regular collaborator Charles Moothart (drums) and newcomer Ben Boye (piano, Wurlitzer) also participating in the recording process. Recording as a live band, Segall noted: "Mugger was a super-sketchy concept record thing, Manipulator was like, 'I wanna do the cleanest, shiniest glam rock record.' They all have a thing, and the thing for this record was that I recorded it live with a band. [...] It's the same idea as Slaughterhouse, but with my songs. That's gonna' be the band for the indefinite future, as well." Reflecting on the recording process, Segall elaborated: "I’d always recorded overdub records. I love the weird overdub style, like The Madcap Laughs by Syd Barrett, where you can tell it’s being overdubbed and it’s kind of warbly. It creates a different experience. Or the White Album, where you can tell it’s overdubbing. But there’s something about a band in a room – it’s a feeling you can’t replicate. There’s a feel to the music. The band is so good, and I love the feel of this record."

The album was recorded with noted alternative rock recording engineer Steve Albini, with Segall noting: "He’s a master. I think we share an opinion on how to make a record. It's so much fun. He just wants to help you make what you want to make. There’s no ego. He doesn’t insert himself into the situation in a crazy way; he just wants to achieve what you want to do. What we were doing, I think, is one of his favourite things to do – just a band in a room playing super loud music." Drummer Charles Moothart noted, "He works hard, but also works smart. He knows how to use his time and how to get the best results, and ultimately wants to be a tool to help whoever he is working with get what they want out of the session. That can be intimidating at first, but at the end of the day he is an inspirational person to work with."

A press release from Segall's label described the album's sound: "The construction and destruction of [Segall's] chosen realities has, until now, been a luxury Ty has rightfully reserved for himself, striping overdubs together to form the sound - but for this new album, he entered a studio backed by a full band - Emmett Kelly, Mikal Cronin, Charles Moothart and Ben Boye - to get a read on this so-called clarity."

== Writing and composition ==
The track "Orange Color Queen" is a love song written for Segall's girlfriend Denée. Upon the album's announcement, Segall noted: "I've written her many [songs], but I think this is my favorite. I travel around the world for a living and have developed a slight fear of flying. She's one of the things that makes it better for me to travel. Especially when she is with me. She has orange hair, and is my orange color queen. I rarely write songs like this, because it is so easy to sound disingenuous, but I think this one is pretty good."

== Accolades ==
Publication	Accolade	Year	Rank	Ref.
Uncut	Albums of the Year	2017	22	

== Track listing ==
No.	Title	Length
1.	"Break a Guitar"	3:38
2.	"Freedom"	2:08
3.	"Warm Hands (Freedom Return)"	10:20
4.	"Talkin'"	3:50
5.	"The Only One"	3:54
6.	"Thank You Mr. K"	2:52
7.	"Orange Color Queen"	3:04
8.	"Papers"	3:00
9.	"Take Care (To Comb Your Hair)"	3:08
10.	Untitled	0:12
Total length:		36:06

== Personnel ==
The Freedom Band

- Ty Segall - guitar, vocals
- Emmett Kelly - guitar, backing vocals
- Mikal Cronin - bass guitar, backing vocals (track 9)
- Charles Moothart - drums, percussion
- Ben Boye - piano, Wurlitzer

== Charts ==
Chart (2017)	Peak position
Belgian Albums (Ultratop Flanders)	129
Belgian Albums (Ultratop Wallonia)	100
French Albums (SNEP)	159
Scottish Albums (Official Charts)	66
US Billboard 200	143
