= Three Bells =

Studio album by Ty Segall
- Released: January 26, 2024
- Length: 64:59
- Label: Drag City
- Producer: Ty Segall; Cooper Crain

Ty Segall chronology
Hello, Hi (2022)	Three Bells (2024)	Love Rudiments (2024)

Three Bells is the fifteenth studio album by the American garage rock musician Ty Segall, released on January 26, 2024, on Drag City Records. It was produced by Segall and Cooper Crain, and received acclaim from critics.

== Critical reception ==
Professional ratings
Aggregate scores
Source	Rating
Metacritic	81/100
Review scores
Source	Rating
AllMusic	3.5/5 stars
Exclaim!	7/10
Mojo	4/5 stars
Pitchfork	7.8/10
The Skinny	4/5 stars
Uncut	8/10

Three Bells received a score of 81 out of 100 on review aggregator Metacritic based on nine critics' reviews, indicating "universal acclaim". Uncut stated that "this is an album that sounds like it's had time spent on it. It's brilliantly recorded, pristine and perfectly imperfect." Mojo wrote that "this double LP has sonic coherence across 65 minutes of taut, sinewy but ever-unpredictable compositions, with a subtly altered sound palette". Exclaim!'s Bruno Coulombe" felt that the album "immediately suggests a denser approach, not just in scope and length but in structure too" than Hello, Hi (2022), as "many of the tracks here form multi-part journeys where contrasting ideas are juxtaposed". Lewis Wade of The Skinny called it "a paranoid, claustrophobic enigma. He can still shred with the best of them ('Wait', 'Hi Dee Dee', 'Watcher'), but across this hour-plus album he revels in upending expectations" with "abrupt tonal shifts" into different genres.

AllMusic's Mark Deming wrote that "one could credit the easygoing but solid interplay between Segall and his accompanists for giving this music such an engaging feel, but most of the time, Segall is backing himself, dubbing bass, drums, and percussion over his stacks of guitar". Pitchfork's Stuart Berman described the album as "a mid-career standout full of gunky riffs and tender love" as Segall "delivers some of his most immaculately constructed grotesquerie to date".

== Track listing ==
All lyrics are written by Ty Segall, except where noted; all music is composed by Ty Segall, except "Move" written by Ty Segall, Mikal Cronin, Emmett Kelly, and Charles Moothart.

Three Bells track listing
No.	Title	Length
1.	"The Bell"	5:07
2.	"Void" (T. Segall, Denée Segall)	6:43
3.	"I Hear"	4:36
4.	"Hi Dee Dee"	3:11
5.	"My Best Friend" (T. Segall, D. Segall)	3:16
6.	"Reflections"	4:02
7.	"Move" (T. Segall, D. Segall)	3:15
8.	"Eggman" (T. Segall, D. Segall)	4:04
9.	"My Room"	4:17
10.	"Watcher" (T. Segall, D. Segall)	5:28
11.	"Repetition"	2:24
12.	"To You"	5:14
13.	"Wait"	4:34
14.	"Denée"	5:57
15.	"What Can We Do"	2:51
Total length:		64:59

== Personnel ==
Musicians

- Ty Segall – vocals, guitar, percussion (all tracks); drums (tracks 1–6, 8–15), bass guitar (1, 3–5, 8–12, 15), keyboards (2, 12)
- Emmett Kelly – bass guitar (tracks 2, 6, 13, 14), electric guitar (7), acoustic guitar (13)
- Ben Boye – keyboards (tracks 7, 14)
- Denée Segall – lead vocals (track 7), vocals (15)
- Mikal Cronin – bass guitar (track 7)
- Charles Moothart – drums (track 7)

Technical

- Ty Segall – production (all tracks), mixing (tracks 3, 8, 11, 15), recording (tracks 3, 8, 10, 11, 15)
- Cooper Crain – production (all tracks), mixing (tracks 1, 2, 4–7, 9, 10, 12–15), recording (1, 2, 4–6, 9, 12–14)
- Matt Littlejohn – recording (track 7)

Visuals

- Denée Segall – front photo, layout, design

== Charts ==
Chart performance for Three Bells
Chart (2024)	Peak position
UK Album Downloads (OCC)	66
UK Independent Albums (OCC)	24
