= Sleeper (Ty Segall album) =

Studio album by Ty Segall
- Released: August 20, 2013
- Recorded: January – March 2013; 515 National Street, San Francisco
- Genres: Acoustic; neo-psychedelia; psychedelic folk
- Length: 35:53
- Label: Drag City
- Producer: Ty Segall

Ty Segall chronology
Twins (2012)	Sleeper (2013)	Manipulator (2014)

Sleeper is the sixth studio album by American indie rock musician Ty Segall, released on August 20, 2013, on Drag City. Recorded between January and March 2013, the album features primarily acoustic psychedelic folk compositions, and is influenced by the death of Segall's father and his subsequent estrangement from his mother.

Upon the album's release, Segall noted, "I was not in a good spot. I had been through some rough stuff, like my dad passed away, and was going through some relationship issues, too. Plus, I was having all of these awful dreams. Ones about sleep and death, and it's from there that I'd write stuff from. It's not really like what I do. It's more brutal to me."

The album is notable for being the first without a promotional single since Segall's self-titled debut album. Still, in November 2013, an official video for "The Man Man" was released.

== Background and recording ==
The album was written and recorded following the death of Ty Segall's father, Brian Segall. Following the album's release, Segall noted, "It was just therapeutic, really. It just was necessary for me to put that out there, recording a song or writing it down on a piece of paper to get it out of my head and body, so I could move on to other things."

At this time, Segall became estranged from his mother, writing the track "Crazy" directly about her. Segall stated, "I hope she hears it, 'cause she needs to wake up and change what she does with her life. I'm a bit bitter about that relationship. I don't want to go into details, 'cause that's not classy. That's another reason I was like, 'Should I put this out?' I'm directly calling out my mother and saying 'Crazy' is about her. You only have one mother, technically, so that's pretty intense, but that's the thing. If she hears it and decides that she wants to change what she's doing with her life and wants to rethink what's going on, then there you go, that's great."

Regarding Sleeper's recording process, Segall noted, "It was like I didn't really know what I was doing. I thought at first it was all demos and then they eventually became songs. It was a lot of, "I don't know where this is going man," and then a lot of, "I don't know if people are going to dig this," and, "What is this?" and then, "Oh shit, I guess this is it." [...] I didn't set out to do an acoustic thing." Segall elaborated, "I'd record with the eight-track in my house, and then I'd go over to a friend's house and record. My friend Eric Bauer was in San Francisco, and I'd go to his house three to four times a week. It was all very available to me. It felt good, to be able to work hard and really stretch out the whole production."

== Writing and composition ==
Regarding Sleeper's overall acoustic aesthetic, Segall noted, "There wasn't any intention behind it, which is the weird thing. It's not like I set out to do an acoustic or mellow thing. It kind of just fit what was happening. It wasn't like a decision, it was kind of more of a response."

According to Segall, the track, "She Don't Care", "is one of the more intense songs. It's about someone, but it's more about being brutal. I don't care if the specific person hears it and feels bad about it. It's more about me getting it out of my system. Not to sound spiteful, though."

=== Alternative album titles ===
The album is given four alternative titles in album's liner notes: An Ode to the Man Man, The Sleeper, A Farewell to C.C. Crazy and Mr. Mercedes.

== The Sleeper Band ==
Although the album is performed almost entirely by Ty Segall, a specific backing band was formed for its live performances, entitled "The Sleeper Band". The band consisted of Nodzzz and White Fence guitarist Sean Paul, The Traditional Fools' bassist Andrew Luttrell, and regular band member and Fuzz guitarist Charles Moothart on drums. Regarding this touring configuration, Segall noted, "We're doing The Sleeper Band, which is the mellow version. It's not the Ty Segall Band, but The Sleeper Band. [...] I don't think it'll be hard for us to do it, because I have a different band for this tour. [Regular band members] Mikal Cronin and Emily Rose Epstein are touring for Mikal's record. I decided to just take that cue and assemble a mellow band."

== Critical reception ==
Professional ratings
Aggregate scores
Source	Rating
Metacritic	79/100
Review scores
Source	Rating
AllMusic	4/5 stars
The A.V. Club	A-
Paste	9.3/10
Pitchfork	8.2/10

Writing for Pitchfork, Evan Minsker gave the album a very positive review, stating: "Everything here easily lives in the same universe - ten tracks of similarly hued songs, all of a piece. It's [Segall's] most focused album, with every song's tone easily flowing into the next, and it's also one of his best."

== Track listing ==
No.	Title	Length
1.	"Sleeper"	3:55
2.	"The Keepers"	3:42
3.	"Crazy"	2:28
4.	"The Man Man"	3:17
5.	"She Don't Care"	3:50
6.	"Come Outside"	4:34
7.	"6th Street"	2:55
8.	"Sweet C.C."	3:36
9.	"Queen Lullabye"	4:21
10.	"The West"	3:15

== Personnel ==
=== Musicians ===
- Ty Segall - vocals, guitars, percussion
- K. Dylan Edrich - violin and viola (1 and 5)
- David Novick - drums (2)

=== Recording personnel ===
- Ty Segall - recording
- John Golden - mastering

=== Artwork ===
- Denee Petracek - artwork and portrait photograph

== Charts ==
Chart (2014)	Peak position
Belgian Albums (Ultratop Flanders)	153
Belgian Albums (Ultratop Wallonia)	151
