= Charles Moothart =

American singer-songwriter

Charles Frances Moothart
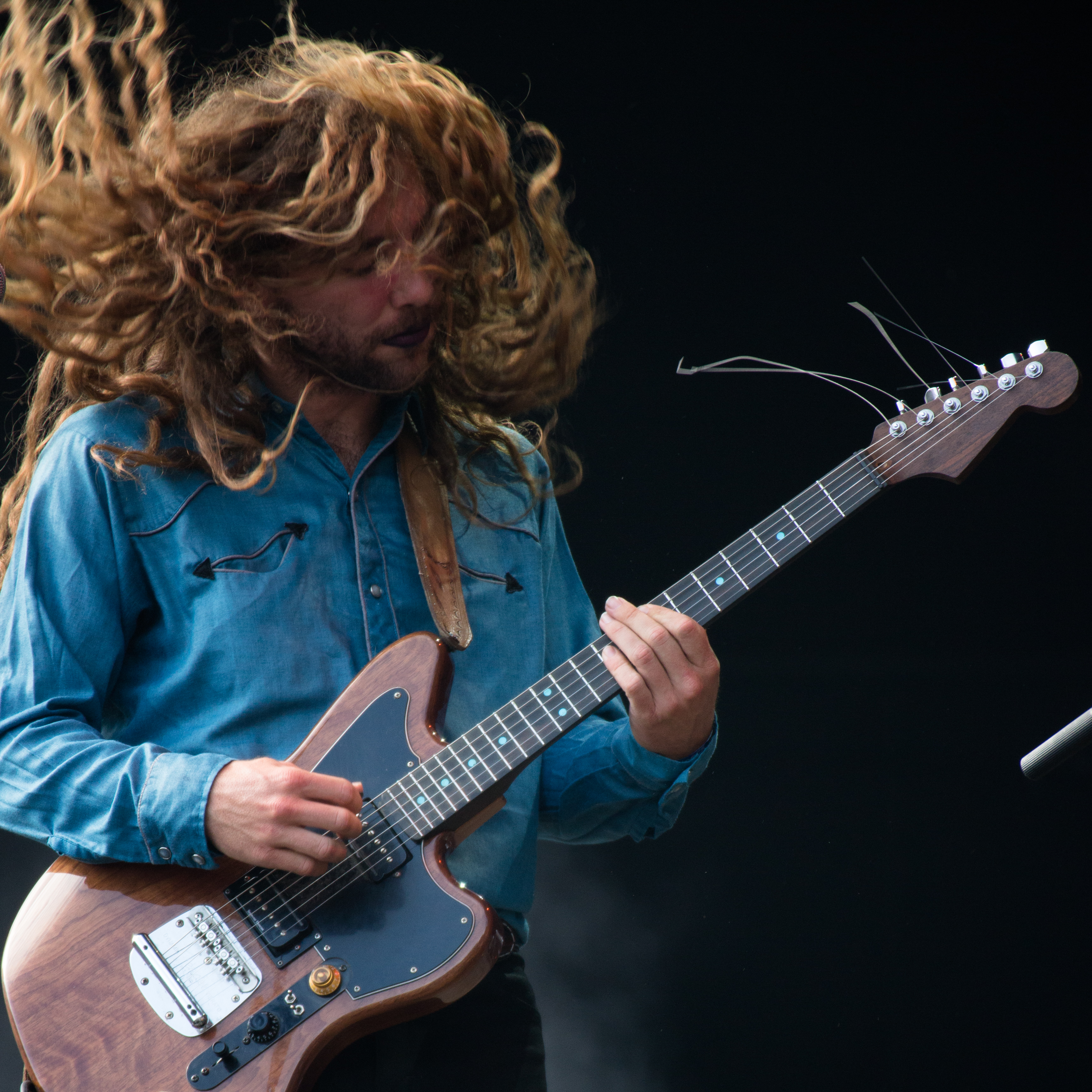
- Moothart in 2015

Background information
- Also known as: CFM
- Born: 1989 (age 36–37); Laguna Beach, California, United States
- Genres: Garage rock, psychedelic rock, garage punk, noise rock, lo-fi, glam rock
- Occupations: Musician, songwriter, multi-instrumentalist
- Instruments: Guitar, drums
- Label: In the Red Records

Charles Frances Moothart (born 1989) is an American multi-instrumentalist, singer and songwriter. He is best known for his collaborations with the garage rock musicians Ty Segall and Mikal Cronin. Moothart is the drummer for Segall's current backing band, The Freedom Band. He was previously the guitarist for Segall's backing band, the Ty Segall Band, and is the guitarist and vocalist in the pair's hard rock project, Fuzz. Additionally, he is a member of Segall's collaborative project with Ex-Cult's Chris Shaw, GØGGS.

As well as playing in the Ty Segall Band, both Moothart and Cronin were members of the Moonhearts, with Moothart assisting Cronin on his solo albums, Mikal Cronin (2011) and MCII (2013).

In 2016, Moothart released his first solo album, Still Life of Citrus and Lime, under the name CFM. A second solo album, Dichotomy Desaturated, was released in March 2017. A third album, Soundtrack to an Empty Room was released July 5, 2019.

== Discography ==
As CFM

- Still Life of Citrus and Slime (2016)
- Dichotomy Desaturated (2017)
- Soundtrack to an Empty Room (2019)
- Soft Crime (EP, 2021)
- Black Holes Don't Choke (2024)
- Chaotic Shimmer (EP, 2025)

With Ty Segall

- Melted (2010)
- Slaughterhouse (2012)
- Twins (2012)
- Manipulator (2014)
- Mr. Face (2015)
- Live in San Francisco (2015)
- Emotional Mugger (2016)
- Ty Segall (2017)
- Freedom's Goblin (2018)
- Deforming Lobes (2019)
- Harmonizer (2021)

With Fuzz

- Fuzz (2013)
- II (2015)
- III (2020)

With Mikal Cronin

- Mikal Cronin (2011)
- MCII (2013)

With The Moonhearts

- Thunderbeast (2008)
- Drop In Drop Out (2009)
- Moonhearts (2010)

With Primitive Ring

- Primitive Ring (2026)
