= Beware (Bonnie Prince Billy album) =

Studio album by Bonnie "Prince" Billy
- Released: March 17, 2009
- Genre: Americana, alternative country, indie folk
- Length: 46:02
- Label: Drag City

Bonnie "Prince" Billy chronology
Lie Down in the Light (2008)	Beware (2009)	The Wonder Show of the World (2010)

Beware is a studio album by Will Oldham. It was released under the moniker Bonnie "Prince" Billy on Drag City in 2009.

== Critical reception ==
Professional ratings
Aggregate scores
Source	Rating
Metacritic	74/100
Review scores
Source	Rating
AllMusic	3.5/5 stars
Drowned in Sound	4/10
Entertainment Weekly	B+
Pitchfork	7.9/10
PopMatters	4/10
Rolling Stone	2/5 stars
Spin	3.5/5 stars
The Skinny	3/5 stars
Toro	7.5/10
Uncut	4/5 stars

Critical response to Beware was generally favorable and positive. At Metacritic, which assigns a normalized rating out of 100 to reviews from mainstream critics, the album has received an average score of 74 ("Generally favorable reviews"), based on 32 professional reviews, and the average user rating for the album is 8.5 (out of 10) based on 12 users' votes. Ben Ratliff of The New York Times gave a positive review of the album, writing: "There's a sense here of smart people being made to focus on a strange project."

== Track listing ==
All tracks are written by Will Oldham.

No.	Title	Length
1.	"Beware Your Only Friend"	4:01
2.	"You Can't Hurt Me Now"	3:42
3.	"My Life's Work"	3:53
4.	"Death Final"	3:01
5.	"Heart's Arms"	3:26
6.	"You Don't Love Me"	3:09
7.	"You Are Lost"	2:55
8.	"I Won't Ask Again"	4:26
9.	"I Don't Belong to Anyone"	3:15
10.	"There Is Something I Have to Say"	3:19
11.	"I Am Goodbye"	2:21
12.	"Without Work, You Have Nothing"	3:45
13.	"Afraid Ain't Me"	4:49

- Tracks 12–13 were only available on the initial pressing and have been removed from subsequent pressings. These tracks have been released as a digital download single and the new eleven-track version of Beware has an alternative cover. These changes were instigated by Will Oldham who felt that I Am Goodbye is more suitable as the final track.

== Personnel ==
- Will Oldham – music

Backing band

- Joshua Abrams – bass guitar, guimbri, vocals
- Jennifer Hutt – violin, vocals
- Emmett Kelly – guitar, keyboards, vocals
- Michael Zerang – percussion, marimba, drums, vocals

Special guests

- Greg Leisz – mandolin, pedal steel guitar
- Rob Mazurek – cornet
- Dee Alexander – vocals
- Leroy Bach – organ
- Jim Becker – banjo
- Robert Cruz – accordion
- D.V. DeVincentis – saxophone
- Jon Langford – vocals
- Nicole Mitchell – flute
- Azita Youssefi – piano, synthesizer
- Neil Strauch – engineering, mixing
- Paul Oldham – mastering
- Sammy Harkham – back cover, label design
- Dan Osborn – layout design
- Jeff Hamilton – cover illustration

== Charts ==
Chart	Peak position
Austrian Albums (Ö3 Austria)	69
Belgian Albums (Ultratop Flanders)	21
Danish Albums (Hitlisten)	29
Dutch Albums (Album Top 100)	67
French Albums (SNEP)	124
German Albums (Offizielle Top 100)	66
Norwegian Albums (VG-lista)	28
Swedish Albums (Sverigetopplistan)	58
Swiss Albums (Schweizer Hitparade)	60
UK Albums (OCC)	71
US Billboard 200	114
