= Witch (American band) =

American stoner metal band

- Origin: Vermont, Los Angeles, and Massachusetts
- Genres: Stoner metal, doom metal, psychedelic rock
- Years active: 2005–present
- Label: Tee Pee
- Members: J Mascis; Kyle Thomas; Graham Clise
- Past members: Asa Irons; Kurt Weisman; Antoine Guerlain; Dave Sweetapple

Witch is an American stoner metal band formed in 2005 whose members are from Vermont and Massachusetts. It is a side project of J Mascis of Dinosaur Jr., and Kyle Thomas of King Tuff, Feathers, and Ty Segall's band The Muggers.

== History ==
Witch was formed on 19 March 2005 by Dinosaur Jr. guitarist J Mascis and long time friend Dave Sweetapple. However, Mascis does not play guitar for the band; he plays his first instrument, the drums. To complete the band's line-up, Mascis and Sweetapple recruited the guitarist and vocalist Kyle Thomas (also known as King Tuff) from avant-folk group Feathers. Their eponymous debut album was released on March 7, 2006 by Tee Pee Records. They also contributed an alternate version of the song "Rip Van Winkle" to the Invaders compilation, which was released by Kemado Records later that year. Witch would play sporadic shows around the United States while working on their next album.

Their second album, Paralyzed was released on March 18, 2008, also under Tee Pee Records. The band would continue to tour throughout the US and Europe with the band Graveyard, making appearances at SXSW and Roadburn Festival. A new guitarist in Graham Clise would soon join the band, and Witch would go on to tour with Earthless throughout 2009.

For the next several years Witch would perform sporadic shows, while making notable appearances at Roadburn Festival 2012, Burgerama 2015, and Levitation Vancouver 2015. Witch would return to Europe in 2019, making appearances at DesertFest London, DesertFest Berlin, and a one-off show in Sweden, following with a fall tour of the US West Coast with bands Mondo Drag and Pushy. Witch has continued to tour throughout the world, playing shows in Australia and the US.

In early August 2024, bassist Dave Sweetapple died at the age of 58.

== Band members ==
- Kyle Thomas – vocals, guitar
- Graham Clise – guitar
- J Mascis – drums

== Discography ==
=== Albums ===
- 2006 – Witch – Tee Pee Records
- 2008 – Paralyzed – Tee Pee Records

=== Singles ===
- 2006 – "Soul of Fire"/"Rip Van Winkle (Demo)" 7-inch – Tee Pee Records
- 2008 – Witch/Earthless split 7-inch – Volcom Entertainment Vinyl Club

=== DVD ===
- 2007 – Local Band Nitemare – Blueberry Honey/Tee Pee Records (reissue)

=== Live albums ===
- 2012 - Die Fehl-Ritzhausen Kassette - Who Can You Trust? (Sold on cassette only, limited to 200 copies)
