= Wolfroy Goes to Town =

Studio album by Bonnie "Prince" Billy
- Released: October 4, 2011
- Genre: Americana, alternative country, folk
- Length: 50:19
- Label: Drag City

Bonnie "Prince" Billy chronology
The Wonder Show of the World (2010)	Wolfroy Goes to Town (2011)	The Marble Downs (2012)

Wolfroy Goes to Town is a studio album by Will Oldham. It was released under the name Bonnie "Prince" Billy on Drag City in 2011.

== Critical reception ==
Professional ratings
Aggregate scores
Source	Rating
Metacritic	76/100
Review scores
Source	Rating
AllMusic	3.5/5 stars
The Guardian	4/5 stars
Pitchfork	7.8/10

Critical response to Wolfroy Goes to Town was generally positive. At Metacritic, which assigns a normalized rating out of 100 to reviews from mainstream critics, the album has received an average score of 76 ("Generally favorable reviews"), based on 21 professional reviews. Anthony Carew, writing for the Alt Music Guide, declared that the album was Oldham's "best, or at least most beautiful, since 1999's I See a Darkness". John Mulvey, in Uncut, noted that the album's "mood is even more quiet, delicate and sepulchral than that of The Wonder Show of the World", and approved of the sense of "unflinching intimacy, extreme focus... finely-wrought songs whittled down to their essence, then allowed to unravel in the most stately and unhurried way". Writing for Dusted, Joe Bernardi also commented on the album's starkness, suggesting that Wolfroy Goes To Town is "the sound of a lack, a series of sparse arrangements complementing desolate lyrics about rural desolation... The result makes for a listening experience that’s intense and potentially awkward, but one that also somehow rings true." No Ripcord's David John Wood compared the album to The Wicker Man, advising listeners not to "listen in the dark".

== Track listing ==
All tracks are written by Will Oldham.

No.	Title	Length
1.	"No Match"	5:55
2.	"New Whaling"	5:39
3.	"Time to Be Clear"	4:03
4.	"New Tibet"	4:31
5.	"Black Captain"	6:35
6.	"Cows"	4:55
7.	"There Will Be Spring"	3:32
8.	"Quail and Dumplings"	4:57
9.	"We Are Unhappy"	6:46
10.	"Night Noises"	3:27

== Personnel ==
Credits adapted from liner notes.

- Will Oldham – music, mixing
- Ben Boye – electric piano, synthesizer, pump organ, vocals
- Van Campbell – drums, percussion
- Shahzad Ismaily – percussion, guitar, vocals, mixing
- Emmett Kelly – guitar, mandolin, vocals, mixing
- Danny Kiely – bass guitar
- Angel Olsen – vocals
- Paul Oldham – mastering
- Sammy Harkham – illustration
- Shane Spaulding – photography
- Marko Markewycz – label design
- Dan Osborn – layout

== Charts ==
Chart	Peak position
Belgian Albums (Ultratop Flanders)	52
Norwegian Albums (VG-lista)	40
