= Mikal Cronin (album) =

Studio album by Mikal Cronin
- Released: September 11, 2011
- Genre: Garage rock, psychedelic pop, power pop
- Length: 34:06
- Label: Trouble in Mind Records

Mikal Cronin chronology
Reverse Shark Attack (2009)	Mikal Cronin (2011)	MCII (2013)

Mikal Cronin is the first solo album from the Moonhearts bassist Mikal Cronin. He had previously released the 2009 album Reverse Shark Attack, a collaborative record with Ty Segall. Uncut placed it at number 45 on its list of the "Top 50 Albums of 2011".

== Track listing ==
1. "Is It Alright" – 3:29
2. "Apathy" – 2:39
3. "Green & Blue" – 3:37
4. "Get Along" – 3:53
5. "Slow Down" – 2:00
6. "Gone" – 3:55
7. "Situation" – 1:56
8. "Again & Again" – 4:16
9. "Hold on Me" – 3:06
10. "The Way Things Go" – 5:15

Professional ratings
Aggregate scores
Source	Rating
Metacritic	81/100
Review scores
Source	Rating
AllMusic	3.5/5 stars
Beats Per Minute	81%
Consequence of Sound	4/5 stars
Mojo	4/5 stars
Pitchfork	8.1/10
PopMatters	8/10
The Skinny	3/5 stars
Tom Hull	B
Uncut	4/5 stars
