= Melted =

Studio album by Ty Segall
- Released: June 15, 2010
- Recorded: August – December 2009
- Genre: Garage rock, psychedelic rock
- Length: 30:15
- Label: Goner Records

Ty Segall chronology
Lemons (2009)	Melted (2010)	Goodbye Bread (2011)

Singles from Melted
- 1. "My Sunshine" Released: 2009; 2. "Caesar" Released: 2010

Melted is the third album by American garage rock singer-songwriter Ty Segall. It was released on June 15, 2010 on Goner Records, on CD/LP formats. The songs "My Sunshine" and "Caesar" were officially released as singles, and "Girlfriend" had an official music video.

== Critical reception ==
Professional ratings
Aggregate scores
Source	Rating
Metacritic	82/100
Review scores
Source	Rating
AllMusic	3.5/5 stars
The A.V. Club	A−
Pitchfork	7.5/10

Melted received acclaim from contemporary music critics. At Metacritic, which assigns a normalized rating out of 100 to reviews from mainstream critics, the album received an average score of 82, based on 6 reviews, which indicates "universal acclaim".

== Track listing ==
No.	Title	Length
1.	"Finger"	2:54
2.	"Caesar"	3:30
3.	"Girlfriend"	2:13
4.	"Sad Fuzz"	3:01
5.	"Melted"	2:13
6.	"Mike D's Coke"	1:30
7.	"Imaginary Person"	3:05
8.	"My Sunshine"	2:11
9.	"Bees"	3:05
10.	"Mrs."	2:37
11.	"Alone"	3:56
Total length:		30:15

== Credits ==
- Ty Segall – vocals, guitar, drums, bass, keyboards, percussion, composing, mixing
- Tim Hellman – bass on "Melted"
- Emily Rose Epstein – drums on "Caesar" and "Imaginary Person"
- Jigmae Baer – drums on "Mrs."
- Charlie Moonheart – drums on "Girlfriend"
- John Dwyer – flute on "Caesar"
- King Riff – engineering, mixing
- Eric Bauer – composing, engineering
- Mike Donovan – vocals on "Mike D's Coke", guitar on "Bees", assistant engineer, composing, mixing
- Eric Landmark – mixing
- Jason Ward -mastering
- William Keihn – artwork
- Denée Petracek – photography
