= The Other (King Tuff album) =

Studio album by King Tuff
- Released: 13 April 2018
- Genre: Rock
- Length: 43:36
- Label: Sub Pop

King Tuff chronology
Black Moon Spell (2014)	The Other (2018)	Smalltown Stardust (2023)

Professional ratings
Aggregate scores
Source	Rating
Metacritic	75/100
Review scores
Source	Rating
Allmusic	4/5 stars
Clash	7/10
DIY Magazine	4/5 stars
Exclaim!	8/10
NME	3/5 stars
Pitchfork	6.5/10

The Other is the fourth studio album by American musician King Tuff. It was released on April 13, 2018, under Sub Pop.

== Critical reception ==
The Other was met with "generally favorable" reviews from critics. At Metacritic, which assigns a weighted average rating out of 100 to reviews from mainstream publications, this release received an average score of 75, based on 9 reviews. Aggregator Album of the Year gave the release a 68 out of 100 based on a critical consensus of 11 reviews.

== Track listing ==
No.	Title	Length
1.	"The Other"	6:09
2.	"Raindrop Blue"	4:37
3.	"Thru the Cracks"	3:36
4.	"Psycho Star"	4:41
5.	"Infinite Mile"	3:12
6.	"Birds of Paradise"	4:27
7.	"Circuits in the Sand"	2:59
8.	"Ultraviolet"	4:22
9.	"Neverending Sunshine"	3:40
10.	"No Man's Land"	5:53
Total length:		43:36

== Personnel ==
- Kyle Thomas – vocals, bass, guitars, Wurlitzer, synthesizers, autoharp, organ, percussion
- Ty Segall – drums on tracks 2, 4–7, 9, 10, backing vocals on track 5
- Charles Moothart – drums on track 3
- Mikal Cronin – alto & baritone saxophones on tracks 2, 6
- Jenny Lewis – backing vocals on tracks 3, 4
- Greta Morgan – backing vocals on tracks 3, 4
- Kevin Morby – backing vocals on track 5
