= The Moonhearts =

The Moonhearts, also referred to as Charlie and The Moonhearts as well as Moonhearts, are a three-piece surf punk and garage rock band formed in Laguna Beach, California, in 2006. Both drummer, Charles Moothart and bassist/vocalist Mikal Cronin are known for their collaborations with Ty Segall, as well as members of Segall's backing band, The Ty Segall Band. In 2009 while touring with Ty Segall, The Moonhearts signed with Trouble in Mind Records. Since 2006 the group has released two EP's, Drop in Drop Out, and I Think You're Swell. As well as three albums, Moonhearts, a split LP with Teen Anger referred to as Charlie and The Moonhearts / Teen Anger, or simply Split LP, Thunder Beast and their self-titled debut, Charlie and The Moonhearts.

In 2016, Charlies Moothart described the dynamic of the band: "Mikal Cronin wrote most of the music for Moonhearts. I just played drums. I wrote one song - which Mikal wrote the vocal melody for and helped me finish - but I just played the drums in that band so the name is misleading. The name started as kind of a joke because we were young and didn’t really think too much about it."
