= Paralyzed (album) =

Studio album by Witch
- Released: March 18, 2008
- Genres: Doom metal; stoner metal
- Length: 37:40
- Label: Tee Pee
- Producer: Witch

Witch chronology
Witch (2006)	Paralyzed (2008)

Professional ratings
Review scores
Source	Rating
AllMusic	4/5 stars
Alternative Press	3/5 stars
Pitchfork	4.9/10
The Skinny	3/5 stars

Paralyzed is the second studio album by American doom metal band Witch, founded by J Mascis of Dinosaur Jr. Like their debut, Black Sabbath influence is noted, along with Black Flag influence for this album. This album reflected a bit of a change in Witch's sound, with them drawing more on hardcore punk.

== Track listing ==
1. "Eye" – 3:41
2. "Gone" – 4:40
3. "1000 MPH" – 3:21
4. "Spacegod" – 4:38
5. "Disappear" – 3:37
6. "Sweet Sue" – 4:53
7. "Psychotic Rock" – 4:44
8. "Mutated" – 2:12
9. "Old Trap Line" – 5:54

== Personnel ==
Credits adapted from the liner notes of Paralyzed.

Witch

- Dave Sweetapple - bass
- Kyle Thomas - guitar, vocals
- J Mascis - drums
- Asa Irons - guitar

Additional Personnel

- Kurt Weisman - guitar on "Eye", "Spacegod", "Psychotic Rock", and "Mutated"
- Courtney Brooke - photography

Artwork

- Kyle Thomas - front cover art
- Luke Thomas - front cover art

Production

- Witch - production
- Justin Pizzoferato - recording, mixing at Bisquiteen and Bank Row
- Paul Gold - mastering
- Henry Irons - tech support
- Sky Volz - tech support
- Robin Sweetapple - layout
