= Lemons (album) =

Studio album by Ty Segall
- Released: July 14, 2009
- Recorded: In San Francisco January 9 by Matthew Hartman and Ty Segall and in Costa Mesa by Mike McHugh
- Genre: Indie rock; garage rock; punk rock; lo-fi
- Length: 26:38
- Label: Goner Records

Ty Segall chronology
Ty Segall (2008)	Lemons (2009)	Melted (2010)

Singles from Lemons
- 1. "It" Released: 2008; 2. "Cents" Released: 2009

Professional ratings
Review scores
Source	Rating
AllMusic	3.5/5 stars
Pitchfork	7.4/10

Lemons is the second studio album by American garage rock singer-songwriter Ty Segall. The album was released by Goner Records July 14, 2009 on CD/LP. Lemons was Segall's first album on Goner Records, and his first release to be issued on CD as well as other formats. The song "Cents" was Segall's first official music video. It is the only video released from the album.

== Track listing ==
All songs by Ty Segall, except where noted.

No.	Title	Length
1.	"It No. 1"	2:32
2.	"Standing at the Station"	2:07
3.	"In Your Car"	1:50
4.	"Lovely One"	2:38
5.	"Can't Talk"	2:12
6.	"Cents"	2:08
7.	"Untitled No. 2"	2:53
8.	"Rusted Dust"	2:40
9.	"Die Tonite"	2:18
10.	"Johnny"	1:24
11.	"Drop Out Boogie" (Captain Beefheart & His Magic Band)	1:58
12.	"Like You"	1:58
Total length:		26:38

== Cover art ==
The cover art by Denée Petracek features a blurry photograph of Segall shaking his head horizontally. Petracek was also credited for the cover art of Melted and Sleeper.

== Credits ==
- Ty Segall: Engineering, recording, guitar, vocals, drums.
- Jigmae Baer: Drums on Johnny.
- Matthew Hartman: Recording.
- Mike McHugh: Engineering.
- Denée Petracek: Cover photo.
