= The Wonder Show of the World =

Studio album by Bonnie "Prince" Billy & the Cairo Gang
- Released: March 23, 2010
- Genre: Americana, alternative country
- Length: 47:46
- Label: Drag City

Bonnie "Prince" Billy chronology
Beware (2009)	The Wonder Show of the World (2010)	Wolfroy Goes to Town (2011)

Professional ratings
Review scores
Source	Rating
AllMusic	4/5 stars
The A.V. Club	A−
Consequence of Sound	C
Drowned in Sound	8/10
NME	3/5 stars
Pitchfork	7.4/10

The Wonder Show of the World is a collaborative studio album by Bonnie "Prince" Billy & the Cairo Gang. It was released on Drag City on March 23, 2010.

== Production ==
Will Oldham wrote the lyrics for the album, while Emmett Kelly wrote the music.

== Critical reception ==
American Songwriter wrote that the album "is polished with smooth blues-guitar wanderings, sparse yet catchy percussion arrangements, and a wealth of reverberating ‘60’s psychedelic choral harmonies." The Guardian wrote that Oldham's "intensity forces our concentration, though, unlike Neil Young, he never extends empathy, only demands it."

== Track listing ==
No.	Title	Length
1.	"Troublesome Houses"	4:24
2.	"Teach Me to Bear You"	5:44
3.	"With Cornstalks or Among Them"	3:07
4.	"The Sounds Are Always Begging"	4:58
5.	"Go Folks, Go"	5:53
6.	"That's What Our Love Is"	7:23
7.	"Merciless and Great"	5:31
8.	"Where Wind Blows"	4:15
9.	"Someone Coming Through"	3:46
10.	"Kids"	2:45

== Personnel ==
Credits adapted from liner notes.

- Bonnie "Prince" Billy – music
- The Cairo Gang – music
- Shahzad Ismaily – bass guitar, percussion, vocals
- Phil Elverum – vocals (5, 10)
- Tusi – recording
- Paul Oldham – mastering
- Chris Kelly – artwork
- Joanne Oldham – artwork
- Dan Osborn – layout

== Charts ==
Chart	Peak position
Belgian Albums (Ultratop Flanders)	71
French Albums (SNEP)	176
Norwegian Albums (VG-lista)	32
US Heatseekers Albums (Billboard)	16
