= Joy (White Fence album) =

Studio album by Ty Segall and White Fence
- Released: July 20, 2018
- Length: 30:00
- Label: Drag City

White Fence chronology
For the Recently Found Innocent (2014)	Joy (2018)

Ty Segall chronology
Freedom's Goblin (2018)	Joy (2018)	Fudge Sandwich (2018)

Professional ratings
Aggregate scores
Source	Rating
Metacritic	66/100
Review scores
Source	Rating
AllMusic	3.5/5 stars
Consequence of Sound	C

Joy is a collaborative album by Californian musicians Ty Segall and Tim Presley (playing under the name White Fence). It was released in July 2018 under Drag City Records.

== Accolades ==
Publication	Accolade	Rank	Ref.
Far Out Magazine	Top 50 Albums of 2018	50	

== Track listing ==
No.	Title	Length
1.	"Beginning"	1:44
2.	"Please Don't Leave This Town"	1:32
3.	"Room Connector"	0:46
4.	"Body Behavior"	2:16
5.	"Good Boy"	2:01
6.	"Hey Joel, Where You Going With That?"	2:54
7.	"Rock Flute"	0:28
8.	"A Nod"	2:19
9.	"Grin Without Smile"	1:34
10.	"Other Way"	1:41
11.	"Prettiest Dog"	0:16
12.	"Do Your Hair"	1:35
13.	"She Is Gold"	5:06
14.	"Tommy's Place"	1:52
15.	"My Friend"	3:56
Total length:		30:00

== Charts ==
Chart	Peak position
Belgian Albums (Ultratop Flanders)	113
Belgian Albums (Ultratop Wallonia)	167
US Independent Albums (Billboard)	15
