= Freedom's Goblin =

Studio album by Ty Segall
- Released: January 26, 2018
- Recorded: 2017
- Studio: Electrical Audio; Val's; Gaucho's Electronics; Royal
- Genre: Alternative rock; garage rock
- Length: 74:48
- Label: Drag City

Ty Segall chronology
Ty Segall (2017)	Freedom's Goblin (2018)	First Taste (2019)

Freedom's Goblin is the tenth studio album by the American garage rock musician Ty Segall, released on January 26, 2018, on Drag City. The album is Segall's second to be recorded with his backing band The Freedom Band, formed during the recording of his previous album, Ty Segall.

At seventy-five minutes in length, the album is Segall's longest to date, exceeding 2014's Manipulator by nineteen minutes.

== Writing and composition ==
Regarding the album's varied aesthetic, Segall noted, "I'd say that the theme is the anti-theme, and the idea is to be free, hence the name Freedom's Goblin. I have made a lot of records that have had specific restrictions and confinements in the concept, but for this record the idea was that no idea is inappropriate, no space where we're going to record or create is wrong. The more far out, and the more free we get, the better things are."

== Reception ==
Professional ratings
Aggregate scores
Source	Rating
AnyDecentMusic?	7.9/10
Metacritic	84/100
Review scores
Source	Rating
AllMusic	4/5 stars
Consequence of Sound	B+
Mojo	4/5 stars
NME	4/5 stars
The Observer	4/5 stars
Pitchfork	8.1/10
Q	4/5 stars
Record Collector	3/5 stars
The Times	4/5 stars
Uncut	9/10

The album received widespread positive reviews, with a score of 84 on Metacritic, indicating "universal acclaim".

== Track listing ==
All tracks are written by Ty Segall, except where noted.

No.	Title	Length
1.	"Fanny Dog"	3:39
2.	"Rain"	4:05
3.	"Every 1's a Winner" (Errol Brown)	4:19
4.	"Despoiler of Cadaver"	3:53
5.	"When Mommy Kills You"	2:47
6.	"My Lady's on Fire"	3:52
7.	"Alta"	4:07
8.	"Meaning"	3:07
9.	"Cry Cry Cry"	3:12
10.	"Shoot You Up"	3:20
11.	"You Say All the Nice Things"	4:23
12.	"The Last Waltz" (Segall, Ben Boye, Charles Moothart, Emmett Kelly, Mikal Cronin)	2:24
13.	"She"	6:23
14.	"Prison"	1:06
15.	"Talkin 3"	2:02
16.	"The Main Pretender"	3:00
17.	"I'm Free" (Segall, Kyle Thomas)	2:43
18.	"5 Ft. Tall"	4:34
19.	"And, Goodnight" (Segall, Moothart, Kelly, Cronin)	12:03
Total length:		74:48

== Personnel ==
Musicians

- Ty Segall – vocals, acoustic guitar, percussion (all tracks); electric guitar (tracks 1–8, 10–16, 18, 19), bass guitar (3, 4, 6, 8–12, 14–17), drums (9, 11, 14, 16), synthesizer (17)
- Mikal Cronin – horn arrangements (all tracks), bass guitar (tracks 1, 2, 5, 7, 12, 13, 18, 19), saxophone (1, 2, 6, 15, 16), vocals (1, 5, 7, 12, 13, 18)
- Charles Moothart – drums (tracks 1–3, 5–8, 10, 12, 13, 15, 18, 19), vocals (5, 12)
- Emmett Kelly – vocals (tracks 1–3, 5–7, 10, 12, 13, 18, 19), electric guitar (1, 2, 5, 7, 12, 13, 15, 18, 19)
- Ben Boye – Rhodes (tracks 1, 6, 7, 12, 13, 15), piano (2, 5, 18), vocals (5, 7, 12), Wurlitzer electric piano (6, 19), synthesizer (13)
- David Levine – tenor saxophone (tracks 1, 2)
- Nick Broste – trombone (tracks 1, 2)
- Gerald Bailey – trumpet (tracks 1, 2)
- Fred Armisen – percussion (track 3)
- Savannah Macias – vocals (track 4)
- Denée Segall – lead vocals (track 8)
- Lannie McMillan – tenor saxophone (track 19)
- Jason Yasinsky – trombone (track 19)
- Marc Franklin – trumpet (track 19)

Technical

- JJ Golden – mastering
- Steve Albini – recording (tracks 1–3, 6–8, 10, 18)
- Ty Segall – recording (tracks 4, 5, 9, 14, 16, 17)
- Facundo Bermudez – recording (tracks 12, 13, 15)
- Lawrence "Boo" Mitchell – recording (track 19)

Artwork

- Ty Segall – collage, layout
- Denée Segall – photography, layout

== Charts ==
Chart (2018)	Peak position
Belgian Albums (Ultratop Flanders)	63
Belgian Albums (Ultratop Wallonia)	199
Dutch Albums (Album Top 100)	124
Scottish Albums (OCC)	48
UK Albums (OCC)	73
UK Album Downloads (OCC)	49
UK Independent Albums (OCC)	12
US Billboard 200	117
