= Black Moon Spell =

Studio album by King Tuff
- Released: September 23, 2014
- Studios: Studio B, Los Angeles, California
- Length: 40:55
- Label: Sub Pop
- Producer: Bobby Harlow

King Tuff chronology
| King Tuff (2012) | Black Moon Spell (2014) | The Other (2018) |

Singles from Black Moon Spell
- 1. "Headbanger" Released: September 12, 2014

Professional ratings
Aggregate scores
| Source | Rating |
|---|---|
| AnyDecentMusic? | 7/10 |
| Metacritic | 75/100 |
Review scores
| Source | Rating |
| AllMusic | 4/5 stars |
| Consequence of Sound | B− |
| Drowned in Sound | 6/10 |
| Exclaim! | 8/10 |
| NME | 3.5/5 stars |

Black Moon Spell is the third studio album by American musician King Tuff. It was released on September 23, 2014 under Sub Pop.

== Critical reception ==
Black Moon Spell was met with generally favorable reviews from critics. At Metacritic, which assigns a weighted average rating out of 100 to reviews from mainstream publications, this release received an average score of 75, based on 15 reviews.

=== Accolades ===
Accolades for Black Moon Spell
| Publication | Accolade | Rank | Ref. |
|---|---|---|---|
| Paste | Top 50 Albums of 2014 | 4 | |

== Track listing ==
Black Moon Spell track listing
| No. | Title | Length |
|---|---|---|
| 1. | "Black Moon Spell" | 4:53 |
| 2. | "Sick Mind" | 2:09 |
| 3. | "Rainbow’s Run" | 3:25 |
| 4. | "Headbanger" | 3:28 |
| 5. | "Beautiful Thing" | 2:38 |
| 6. | "I Love You Ugly" | 1:01 |
| 7. | "Magic Mirror" | 2:57 |
| 8. | "Madness" | 2:54 |
| 9. | "Demon From Hell" | 1:29 |
| 10. | "Black Holes in Stereo" | 1:53 |
| 11. | "Radiation" | 1:17 |
| 12. | "Eyes of the Muse" | 4:14 |
| 13. | "Staircase of Diamonds" | 4:47 |
| 14. | "Eddie’s Song" | 3:50 |

== Charts ==
Chart performance for Black Moon Spell
| Chart (2014) | Peak position |
|---|---|
| US Heatseekers Albums (Billboard) | 1 |
