= Witch (Witch album) =

Studio album by Witch
- Released: March 7, 2006
- Genres: Stoner rock, doom metal
- Length: 40:29
- Label: Tee Pee
- Producer: John Agnello

Witch chronology
Witch (2006)	Paralyzed (2008)

Professional ratings
Review scores
Source	Rating
Allmusic	3.5/5 stars
Pitchfork Media	(7.6/10)

Witch is the debut album by Witch, a stoner doom band founded by J Mascis of Dinosaur Jr. "Soul of Fire" was released as a single with a demo version of "Rip Van Winkle" as the b-side. Heavy Black Sabbath influence is cited for this album.

== Track listing ==
1. "Seer" – 7:57
2. "Soul of Fire" – 3:37
3. "Black Saint" – 6:02
4. "Changing" – 6:42
5. "Rip Van Winkle" – 4:43
6. "Hand of Glory" – 5:28
7. "Isadora" – 6:00

== Personnel ==
Credits adapted from the liner notes of Witch.

Witch

- Kyle Thomas - guitar, vocals
- Asa Irons - guitar
- Dave Sweetapple - bass
- J Mascis - drums

Artwork

- Kyle Thomas - front cover art
- Luke Thomas - front cover art

Additional personnel

- Kurt Weisman - organ on "Isadora"
- Ebet Roberts - photography

Production

- John Agnello - production, recording, mixing
- Greg Calbi - mastering at Sterling Sound, New York City
- Robin Sweetapple - layout
- Andy Kman - layout
