= Goodbye Bread =

Studio album by Ty Segall
- Released: June 20, 2011
- Recorded: June 2010–January 2011 at Fantasy Studios, San Francisco, CA
- Genres: Garage rock, folk rock
- Length: 33:38
- Label: Drag City

Ty Segall chronology
Melted (2010)	Goodbye Bread (2011)	Twins (2012)

Singles from Goodbye Bread
- 1. "I Can't Feel It" Released: 7 May 2011

Professional ratings
Aggregate scores
Source	Rating
AnyDecentMusic?	7.4/10
Metacritic	80/100
Review scores
Source	Rating
Allmusic	3.5/5 stars
Beats Per Minute	83%
Cokemachineglow	77%
Earbuddy	9.0/10
No Ripcord	6/10
Now	3/5 Ns
Paste	7.5/10
Pitchfork	8.1/10
PopMatters	8/10
Tiny Mix Tapes	3.5/5 stars

Goodbye Bread is the fourth album by San Francisco garage rock singer-songwriter Ty Segall. Pitchfork placed the album at number 31 on its list of the "Top 50 albums of 2011". The album presented a much more melodic, sappy energy relative to Segall's previous rock-oriented releases. Distortion effects such as fuzz and overdrive, though, were still heavily broadcast in songs such as "My Head Explodes" and "Where Your Head Goes".

Although only one single was released from the album (for "I Can't Feel It"), it spawned three official music videos for "Goodbye Bread", "Where Your Head Goes" and "You Make the Sun Fry".

== Background ==
Writing for the album took 6 months to produce in American producer's Eric Bauer's basement. Ty Segall said of the album:

"This album is the most serious and thought-out one I've done, but all songs have meaning. Like, the Troggs' "I Want You" means way more than wanting to be with a girl. With some music, the lyrics don't even matter because the song hits you right in the face. But I actually do hope people listen to the lyrics on this album, because it's more a of a full idea.

== Release ==
On March 2, 2011, Segall announced the release of Goodbye Bread, along with the music video of the same name.

Segall released the first single "I Can't Feel It" on May 17, 2011, as a 7" format, with non-album single "Falling Hair" appearing on B-side.

== Tour ==
In support of the album, Segall went on a tour of North American and Europe from April–July 2011.

== Critical reception ==
Goodbye Bread was met with "generally favorable" reviews from critics. At Metacritic, which assigns a weighted average rating out of 100 to reviews from mainstream publications, this release received an average score of 80 based on 18 reviews. Aggregate website AnyDecentMusic? gave the release a 7.4 out of 10 based on a critical consensus of 10 reviews.

In a review for AllMusic, critic reviewer Mark Deming wrote: "Goodbye Bread is the sound of Ty Segall mellowing out just a bit; this is a significantly calmer and more measured set of music than most of Segall's previous efforts, not to mention one that's tighter and more coherent. Goodbye Bread sounds more like a "real album" than anything Ty Segall has done to date, but not so much so that it robs him of the loose-limbed soul that makes him memorable." At Beats Per Minute, Jon Blistein explained: "Goodbye Bread does fall into a rhythmic pattern fairly quickly. For the most part, these tracks are steady, mid-tempo rockers that'll leave your head nodding at a zonked-out, mesmerized pace. But before any of this can start to feel repetitive or monotonous, Segall has you hanging on his every hook — the songwriting here is so strong that each song – despite their on-the-surface similarities – feels completely autonomous and deserving of your attention." Earbuddy's Nick Krenn scored the album a 9.0 out of 10 writing "His songs are undeniably attachable to situations within our own lives and feature no whiny love songs. Life isn’t just about love. We have problems that go beyond relationships whether they involve money or our cynicism. Segall works them out with his guitar and drums and gives us the soundtrack to do the same." Randi Dietiker of No Ripcord gave the release a 6 out of 10, noting that it feels like "you’re listening to the same song for the first 15 minutes."

=== Accolades ===
Publications' year-end list appearances for Goodbye Bread
Critic/Publication	List	Rank	Ref
Consequence of Sound	Consequence of Sound's Top 50 Albums of 2011	47	
Exclaim!	Exclaim!'s Top Pop & Rock Albums of 2011	21	
Pitchfork	Pitchfork's Top 50 Albums of 2011	31	

== Track listing ==
Goodbye Bread track listing
No.	Title	Length
1.	"Goodbye Bread"	3:24
2.	"California Commercial"	1:18
3.	"Comfortable Home (A True Story)"	2:18
4.	"You Make The Sun Fry"	2:30
5.	"I Can't Feel It"	4:04
6.	"My Head Explodes"	3:10
7.	"The Floor"	3:36
8.	"Where Your Head Goes"	4:14
9.	"I Am With You"	4:38
10.	"Fine"	4:26
Total length:		33:38

== Charts ==
Chart performance for Goodbye Bread
Chart (2011)	Peak position
US Heatseekers Albums (Billboard)	44
