= Whirlybird (film) =

- Film poster
- Directed by: Matt Yoka
- Produced by: Diane Becker; Matt Yoka
- Starring: Zoey Tur; Marika Gerrard; Katy Tur
- Cinematography: Ed Herrera
- Edited by: Brian Palmer
- Music by: Ty Segall
- Production company: Fishbowl Films
- Distributed by: A&E Indie Films
- Release date: January 26, 2020 (Sundance)
- Running time: 103 minutes
- Country: United States
- Language: English

Whirlybird is a 2020 American documentary film by Matt Yoka. It competed in the US Documentary category at the 2020 Sundance Film Festival.

== Summary ==
The film explores two LA reporters, Zoey Tur and Marika Gerrard who were well known for witnessing an attempted murder during the Rodney King riots, and being the first camera crew to find O.J. Simpson's white Ford bronco cruising down an LA freeway. Significant portions of the film feature Zoey as Bob Tur, before she came out as transgender in 2013.

Tur' and Gerrard's daughter, Katy Tur, is also an award-winning journalist. She is also featured in the film.

== Release and reception ==
Whirlybird had its world premiere at the Sundance Film Festival on January 26, 2020. It was also submitted for Oscar consideration.

On the review aggregator website Rotten Tomatoes, 82% of 39 critics' reviews are positive, with an average rating of 7.4/10. The site's critical consensus reads, "Whirlybird might have benefited from a more patient approach, but it remains a fascinating -- and often thrilling -- look at what goes into making the news."

== See also ==
- June 17th, 1994
- O.J.: Made in America
- LA 92
