= Emotional Mugger =

Studio album by Ty Segall
- Released: January 22, 2016
- Recorded: 2015
- Genres: Garage rock; noise rock; psychedelic rock; experimental rock
- Length: 38:08
- Label: Drag City
- Producers: Ty Segall & F. Bermudez

Ty Segall chronology
| Manipulator (2014) | Emotional Mugger (2016) | Ty Segall (2017) |

Emotional Mugger is the eighth studio album by American garage rock musician Ty Segall, released on January 22, 2016 on Drag City Records. The album was produced by both Segall and F. Bermudez.

To tour in support of Emotional Mugger, Segall assembled a backing band featuring the album's various collaborators. Performing under the name of Ty Segall and the Muggers, the band toured extensively, with Segall often wearing a baby mask and adopting the name of Sloppo.

== Critical reception ==
Professional ratings
Aggregate scores
| Source | Rating |
|---|---|
| AnyDecentMusic? | 7.6/10 |
| Metacritic | 77/100 |
Review scores
| Source | Rating |
| AllMusic | 3.5/5 stars |
| Alternative Press | 4.5/5 stars |
| The A.V. Club | A− |
| Entertainment Weekly | B− |
| The Guardian | 3/5 stars |
| Paste | 8.4/10 |
| Pitchfork | 7.3/10 |
| PopMatters | 8/10 |
| Rolling Stone | 3.5/5 stars |
| Spin | 7/10 |

The album has a Metascore at Metacritic of a 79 out of 100 from 19 reviews. Mark Deming for AllMusic writing "As Segall's profile has risen in the 2010s, it's a welcome thing that he hasn't diluted his musical vision and is still willing to let his music howl when the spirit moves him, and Emotional Mugger is a stiff shot of raw, cocky joy that hits its target beautifully." Rob Sheffield in Rolling Stone saying "The San Francisco garage-punk wunderkind flaunts all his frantic energy and wild-eyed humor on Emotional Mugger." Annie Zaleski for Spin writing "This somewhat-disjointed philosophy adds just the right amount of friction and intrigue to Emotional Mugger, informing the music but not overwhelming it." Evan Minsker in Pitchfork Media saying "'Emotional Mugger still feels transitional—either the moment before he tucks in and gets way weirder or another stepping stone before he switches gears all over again." Collin Fitzgerald for PopMatters writing "Emotional Mugger proves it’s still possible to evolve as an artist within the relatively limiting framework of rock traditionalism, even if the answer is to crank everything up to new extremes, give way to violent stylistic mutation, and completely deconstruct whatever’s comfortable." Michael Madden in Consequence of Sound saying "Emotional Mugger bolsters his status as a singular mind in today’s rock landscape while keeping that reputation in his control." Ryan J. Pardo for Paste saying "In all, Emotional Mugger, for all its elegant distortions, abrasive melodies and overdriven guitar-porn spasms, somehow makes absolute perfect sense as a follow-up to such a universally acclaimed LP like Manipulator." Kevin Warwick in The A.V. Club writing "Which makes Emotional Mugger, Segall’s eighth solo effort, all the more impressive."

Jeff Terich from American Songwriter writing "What's remarkable about Emotional Mugger is how fresh, even interesting it all sounds coming from a performer with an already weighty catalog, in a genre where loud guitars is nothing terribly new. Indeed, Segall has grown into his role as one of rock’s best contemporary songwriters." Andy Jex for musicOMH saying "Emotional Mugger is a wild-eyed beast of a record; unafraid to stamp through the effects pedals with a delirious glee." Uncut writing "Emotional Mugger is as funky as it is twisted—a heavy rock record that truly groves in a way that heavy rock rarely does any more." Alyson Stokes in Alternative Press writing "Prepare to be blown away.... Emotional Mugger is an out-of-this-world psychedelic venture meant to be listened to—and listened to very loud." Cosette Schulz for Exclaim! saying "There's nothing mild about Emotional Mugger; it has an overwhelming sense of madness, but it's addictive nonetheless." Marty Hill in Under the Radar writing "Emotional Mugger feels like one third sarcasm and two thirds complete genius [...] he both parodies and masterclasses modern day garage rock." Samantha Edwards for Now saying "weird experiments from a prodigal songwriter." Chris Kissel in Tiny Mix Tapes writing "Like Funkadelic, Ty Segall's Emotional Mugger is music as cocaine." Grant Rindner in The Line of Best Fit saying "Clocking in at just over 38 minutes, Emotional Mugger is a brief, but engaging listen filled with enough intoxicating moments of pure musicality that its slightly repetitive sound doesn't wind up too grating."

Eric Renner Brown for Entertainment Weekly writing "Emotional Mugger isn’t a bad record — Segall probably doesn’t have one of those in him — it’s among his weakest releases yet." Michael Hann in The Guardian saying " it's an uncomfortable, dissonant record, a bad trip rather than a mellow high." Jesse Cataldo for Slant Magazine saying "an album that's only intermittently satisfying, stranded halfway toward an interesting concept." Mojo saying "Nutty as Emotional Mugger is, it's a joyful trip." David Zammitt in DIY writing "Too often, though, 'Emotional Mugger' is let down by simple self-indulgence."

== Track listing ==
All tracks are written by Ty Segall, except where noted.

| No. | Title | Writer(s) | Length |
|---|---|---|---|
| 1. | "Squealer" | | 3:47 |
| 2. | "Californian Hills" | | 3:09 |
| 3. | "Emotional Mugger / Leopard Priestess" | | 5:21 |
| 4. | "Breakfast Eggs" | | 2:36 |
| 5. | "Diversion" | Eddy Grant | 3:36 |
| 6. | "Baby Big Man (I Want a Mommy)" | | 2:44 |
| 7. | "Mandy Cream" | | 3:16 |
| 8. | "Candy Sam" | | 3:17 |
| 9. | "Squealer Two" | Segall, Cory Hanson | 3:23 |
| 10. | "W.U.O.T.W.S." | | 3:02 |
| 11. | "The Magazine" | | 3:57 |
| Total length: | | | 38:08 |

== Personnel ==
=== Musicians ===
- Ty Segall – vocals, guitar, keyboards, bass guitar, drums, percussion
- Emmett Kelly – guitar (1, 2 and 4)
- Cory Hanson – keyboards (9)
- Mikal Cronin – bass guitar (5), handclaps (9)
- Dale Crover – drums (5)
- Charles Moothart – drums (7)
- Evan Burrows – drums (11), 'Oooohs' (6)
- King Tuff – vocals (7)
- The Lollipop Children – vocals (8)
- Brit Manor – vocals (9)

=== Recording ===
- Ty Segall – producer, recording
- F. Bermudez – producer, recording
- Scott Cornish – mixing engineer

== Charts ==
| Chart (2016) | Peak position |
|---|---|
| Belgian Albums (Ultratop Flanders) | 127 |
| Belgian Albums (Ultratop Wallonia) | 132 |
| US Billboard 200 | 136 |
| US Independent Albums (Billboard) | 6 |
