= Hello, Hi =

Studio album by Ty Segall
- Released: July 22, 2022
- Length: 34:20
- Label: Drag City

Ty Segall chronology
| Harmonizer (2021) | "Hello, Hi" (2022) | Three Bells (2024) |

Singles from Hello, Hi
- 1. "Hello, Hi" Released: April 25, 2022; 2. "Saturday Pt. 2" Released: May 16, 2022

"Hello, Hi" is the fourteenth studio album by the American garage rock musician Ty Segall, released on July 22, 2022, on Drag City Records. Recorded concurrently with Segall's previous studio album, Harmonizer (2021), the album is a mostly acoustic release recorded at Segall's home.

== Track listing ==
All tracks are written by Ty Segall.

"Hello, Hi" track listing
| No. | Title | Length |
|---|---|---|
| 1. | "Good Morning" | 1:56 |
| 2. | "Cement" | 2:25 |
| 3. | "Over" | 3:19 |
| 4. | "Hello, Hi" | 2:46 |
| 5. | "Blue" | 2:55 |
| 6. | "Looking at You" | 4:33 |
| 7. | "Don't Lie" | 4:10 |
| 8. | "Saturday Pt. 1" | 2:55 |
| 9. | "Saturday Pt. 2" | 4:07 |
| 10. | "Distraction" | 5:10 |
| Total length: | | 34:20 |

== Personnel ==
=== Musicians ===
- Ty Segall: vocals, acoustic & electric guitar, bass guitar, electric piano, drums
- Mikal Cronin: saxophone (9)
- Charles Moothart: drums (6, 9, 10)
- Ben Boye: Rhodes piano (6)

=== Production ===
- Ty Segall: recording (1–5, 7–10)
- Cooper Crain: production & recording (6)
- JJ Golden: lacquer cut
- Denée Segall: photography, artwork

== Charts ==
Chart performance for Hello, HI
| Chart (2022) | Peak position |
|---|---|
| Scottish Albums (OCC) | 79 |
| UK Album Downloads (OCC) | 97 |
| UK Independent Albums (OCC) | 17 |
