= Harmonizer (Ty Segall album) =

Studio album by Ty Segall
- Released: August 3, 2021
- Recorded: 2020
- Studios: Harmonizer Studios, Topanga, California
- Genre: Psychedelic rock
- Length: 35:28
- Label: Drag City
- Producers: Cooper Crain; Ty Segall

Ty Segall chronology
First Taste (2019)	Harmonizer (2021)	Hello, Hi (2022)

Singles from Harmonizer
- 1. "Feel Good" Released: August 16, 2021; 2. "Harmonizer" Released: September 13, 2021

Professional ratings
Review scores
Source	Rating
Pitchfork	7.3/10

Harmonizer is the thirteenth studio album by the American garage rock musician Ty Segall, released on August 3, 2021, on Drag City Records. Co-produced by Segall and Cooper Crain, the album's initial digital release was a surprise, with physical copies following in October 2021.

The album features contributions from Denée Segall, who co-wrote and sings lead vocals on "Feel Good", and the members of Segall's backing band, the Freedom Band: Mikal Cronin (bass), Charles Moothart (drums), Emmett Kelly (guitar) and Ben Boye (keyboards).

== Background and recording ==
The album was recorded at Segall's new home studio, Harmonizer Studios, in Topanga, California during the COVID-19 pandemic. A press release described the album as "a synthtastic production redesign that finds Ty dialing up a wealth of tightly controlled beats, thick keyboard textures, guitar and endless harmonies. This glossy sound makes for some of Ty's cleanest songs and starkest ideas to date, bracing him as he revisits the lonely days and loathsome nights of the alienated, grown-up-wrong soul."

== Track listing ==
All tracks are written by Ty Segall.

Harmonizer track listing
No.	Title	Length
1.	"Learning"	1:46
2.	"Whisper"	3:38
3.	"Erased"	4:40
4.	"Harmonizer"	4:48
5.	"Pictures"	4:50
6.	"Ride"	3:12
7.	"Waxman"	3:08
8.	"Play"	2:24
9.	"Feel Good"	2:56
10.	"Changing Contours"	3:56
Total length:		35:28

== Personnel ==
Musicians

- Ty Segall – vocals, bass, drums, guitar, percussion, synthesizer
- Mikal Cronin – bass guitar (2, 5 and 8)
- Emmett Kelly – guitar (2, 5 and 8), backing vocals (2)
- Charles Moothart – drums and percussion (4, 5 and 9)
- Ben Boye – Rhodes piano (2), piano (8)
- Denée Segall – lead vocals (9)
- Cooper Crain – synthesizer (9) and "general modulation overall"

Recording personnel

- Ty Segall – production, mixing
- Cooper Crain – production, engineering, mixing
- Ben Boye – piano recording (8)

Artwork

- Denée Segall – artwork, photography

== Charts ==
Chart performance for Harmonizer
Chart (2021)	Peak position
UK Independent Albums (Official Charts)	34
