= King Tuff =

American musician

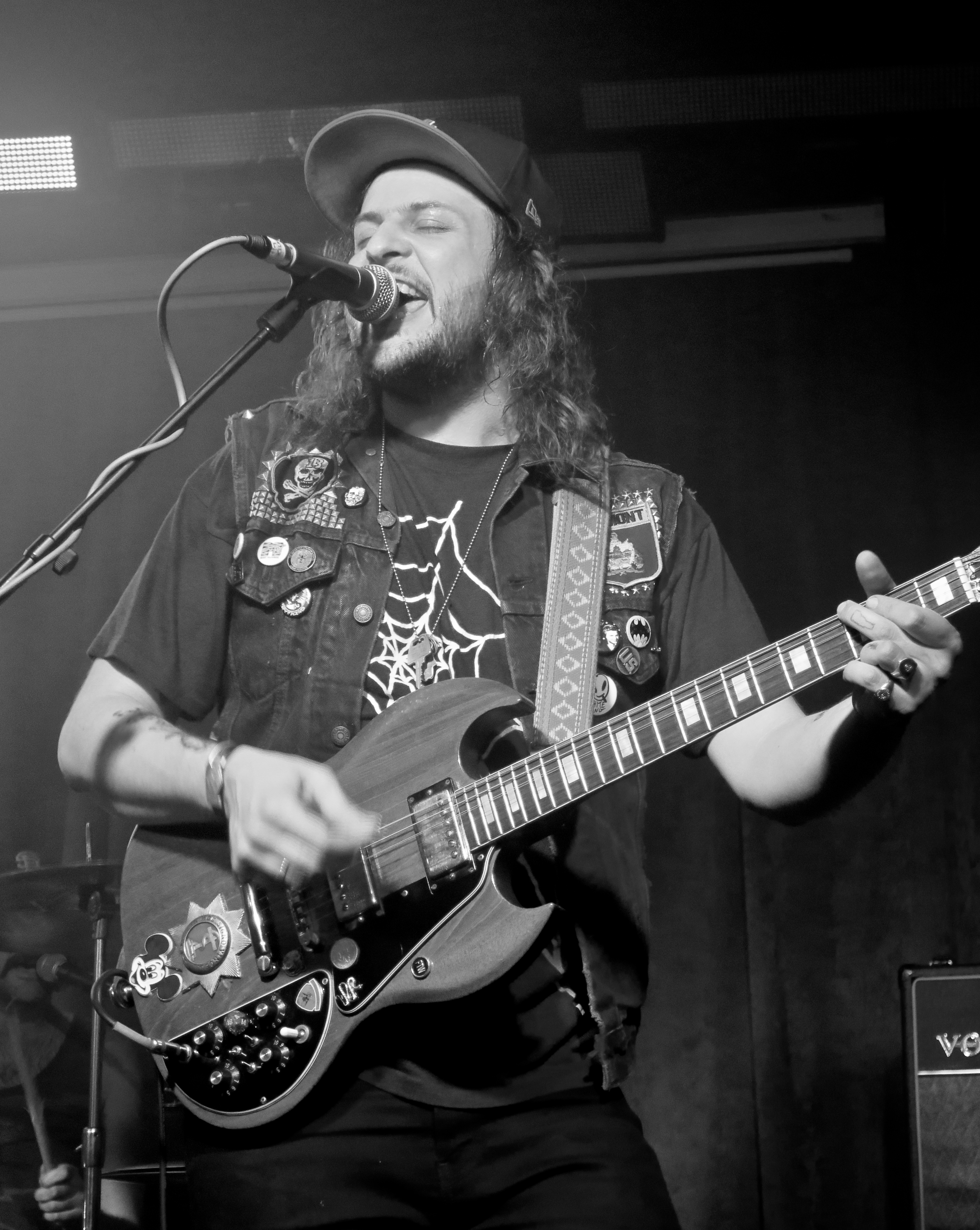
- King Tuff in 2014

Background information
- Origin: Vermont, United States
- Genres: Garage rock, indie pop, power pop, neo-psychedelia, stoner rock
- Years active: 2006–present
- Labels: Sub Pop, Suicide Squeeze, Third Man

Kyle Thomas, known professionally as King Tuff, is an American musician recording on Sub Pop Records. King Tuff and his band have released several music videos and have continually toured across the United States, Australia and Europe since 2012. He is also the lead guitarist and singer of stoner rock band Witch, and was a member of garage rock musician Ty Segall's backing band, the Muggers, formed following the release of Segall's studio album, Emotional Mugger.

== Life and career ==
Thomas grew up in Brattleboro, Vermont. He grew up listening to music from his father, who was a music fan. Prior to his father getting a Fender Stratocaster when Kyle was seven, he played on a keyboard and drum kit. According to Thomas, the Stratocaster served as a source of inspiration. Thomas never decided what he would do with his life, therefore was hesitant to attend college. After high school, Thomas wrote songs and played with bands, saying: "I would go on tour, but I never really took it as a serious job up until a couple years ago, when I decided to really make an effort at it. It's been a real long, slow practice."

Tuff's first release was a self-made CD-R distributed by Spirit of Orr Records, the majority of which consisted of rough versions of songs later released on Was Dead, King Tuff's first 'official' album. Tuff received scant publicity following the beginning of his career as King Tuff, so he moved on to other projects such as the bands Witch and Happy Birthday. "King Tuff" eventually began to gain popularity, leading Thomas to revert to his former stage name of King Tuff.

=== Was Dead ===
King Tuff's 2008 debut album Was Dead was originally released by Tee Pee Records sister-label The Colonel. It is now considered collectable because so few were pressed. In 2013, Burger Records re-issued a Deluxe blue edition, which charted in the No. 8 position on Billboard's Heatseeker chart dated June 6.

=== King Tuff ===
His second album, King Tuff was produced by Bobby Harlow and released by Sub Pop on May 29, 2012, charting at No. 21 on Billboard's Heatseeker Albums chart. The album also debuted on the CMJ charts at No. 14, eventually climbing to No. 2 and knocking Jack White's Blunderbuss from its top charting position.

=== Black Moon Spell ===
On September 23, 2014, King Tuff released his third album, Black Moon Spell, on Sub Pop Records, again produced by Bobby Harlow, and featuring Ty Segall as guest drummer on the title track. Upon release, the album immediately became CMJ's "most added" for the week of September 23 on college radio airplay. The album debuted at No. 1 on Billboard Heatseeker in the "Hot Shot Debut" position chart for the week of October 11, and immediately pushed to the No. 1 position on the CMJ College Radioplay chart for the week of October 14.

== Discography ==
=== Studio albums ===
- Mindblow (2006)
- Was Dead (2007)
- King Tuff (2012)
- Black Moon Spell (2014)
- The Other (2018)
- Smalltown Stardust (2023)
- Moo (2026)

=== EPs and singles ===
- Hex Dispensers, The / King Tuff – Agatha's Antlers / Hands (2011)
- Wild Desire (2012)
- Screaming Skull (2012)
- King Tuff / Lentils, The – Biggest Hearts / That Sweet Disease, Pitchfork Review 7" Single Series Vol. 3 (2014)
- "Psycho Star" (2018)
- "Smalltown Stardust" (2022)

=== Live albums ===
- Live at Third Man Records (2013)
- Live at Pickathon: Ty Segall / King Tuff (with Ty Segall) (2015)

=== Witch ===
- Witch (2006)
- Paralyzed (2008)

=== Happy Birthday ===
- Happy Birthday (2010)
- Shampoo (7" single) (2010)
