= First Taste (Ty Segall album) =

Studio album by Ty Segall
- Released: August 2, 2019
- Genre: Garage rock
- Length: 40:56
- Label: Drag City

Ty Segall chronology
| Freedom's Goblin (2018) | First Taste (2019) | Harmonizer (2021) |

Professional ratings
Aggregate scores
| Source | Rating |
|---|---|
| Metacritic | 79/100 |
Review scores
| Source | Rating |
| AllMusic | 3.5/5 stars |
| Consequence of Sound | B+ |
| DIY | 3.5/5 stars |
| Exclaim! | 8/10 |
| Paste | 7.7/10 |
| Pitchfork | 7.5/10 |

First Taste is the twelfth studio album by American musician Ty Segall. It was released on August 2, 2019 under Drag City.

The first single from the album, "Taste" was released June 4, 2019. In support of the album, Segall and The Freedom Band announced a tour of the US through July to October 2019, and then a European tour after October.

== Critical reception ==
First Taste was met with generally favorable reviews from critics. At Metacritic, which assigns a weighted average rating out of 100 to reviews from mainstream publications, this release received an average score of 79, based on 19 reviews

=== Accolades ===
| Publication | Accolade | Rank | Ref. |
|---|---|---|---|
| Drift Records | Top 100 Albums of 2019 | 9 | |
| Les Inrocks | Top 100 Albums of 2019 | 34 | |
| Piccadilly Records | Top 100 Albums of 2019 | 88 | |

== Track listing ==
First Taste track listing
| No. | Title | Length |
|---|---|---|
| 1. | "Taste" | 3:36 |
| 2. | "Whatever" | 4:24 |
| 3. | "Ice Plant" | 3:33 |
| 4. | "The Fall" | 2:57 |
| 5. | "I Worship the Dog" | 3:34 |
| 6. | "The Arms" | 3:30 |
| 7. | "When I Met My Parents, Pt. 1" | 1:03 |
| 8. | "I Sing Them" | 2:39 |
| 9. | "When I Met My Parents, Pt. 3" | 2:15 |
| 10. | "Radio" | 3:50 |
| 11. | "Self Esteem" | 5:03 |
| 12. | "Lone Cowboys" | 4:32 |

== Charts ==
Chart performance for …
| Chart | Peak position |
|---|---|
| US Independent Albums (Billboard) | 13 |
