= Manipulator (Ty Segall album) =

Studio album by Ty Segall
- Released: August 25, 2014
- Recorded: 2013
- Genre: Psychedelic rock, garage rock, glam rock
- Length: 56:24
- Label: Drag City

Ty Segall chronology
Sleeper (2013)	Manipulator (2014)	Emotional Mugger (2016)

Professional ratings
Aggregate scores
Source	Rating
AnyDecentMusic?	7.9/10
Metacritic	81/100
Review scores
Source	Rating
AllMusic	4/5 stars
The A.V. Club	B+
The Guardian	4/5 stars
Mojo	4/5 stars
NME	8/10
Pitchfork	7.8/10
Q	4/5 stars
Record Collector	4/5 stars
Rolling Stone	3/5 stars
Uncut	8/10

Manipulator is the seventh studio album by American rock musician Ty Segall, released on August 25, 2014, on Drag City. The album took 14 months to complete, much longer than any previous Segall release. The album met a positive critical reception and became Segall's first album to chart on the Billboard 200, where it peaked at number 45.

== Track listing ==
All tracks are written by Ty Segall, except for "Who's Producing You?" written by Mike Donovan.

No.	Title	Length
1.	"Manipulator"	3:10
2.	"Tall Man Skinny Lady"	4:03
3.	"The Singer"	4:16
4.	"It's Over"	3:01
5.	"Feel"	4:17
6.	"The Faker"	4:09
7.	"The Clock"	2:53
8.	"Green Belly"	2:33
9.	"The Connection Man"	2:19
10.	"Mister Main"	2:48
11.	"The Hand"	4:45
12.	"Susie Thumb"	2:30
13.	"Don't You Want to Know? (Sue)"	2:36
14.	"The Crawler"	2:25
15.	"Who's Producing You?"	2:55
16.	"The Feels"	3:09
17.	"Stick Around"	4:34
Total length:		56:24

== Personnel ==
=== Musicians ===
- Ty Segall
- Chris Woodhouse: synthesizer (1), percussion (5), piano (8, 10)
- Irene Sazer: violin (3, 7, 17)
- Matthias McIntire: viola (3, 7, 17)
- Jessica Ivry: cello (3, 7, 17)
- Brit Lauren Manor: vocals (3, 5, 11)
- Charles Moothart: guitar (6, 15)
- Mikal Cronin: bass, vocals (6)
- Emily Rose Epstein: drums (6)
- Sean Presley: vocals (14)
- Steve Nutting: drums (17)

=== Production ===
- Ty Segall: co-producer
- Chris Woodhouse: co-producer, recording, mixing
- Mikal Cronin: string arrangements
- Dan O.: layout
- Denée Petracek: artwork, photography

== Charts ==
Chart (2014)	Peak position
Belgian Albums (Ultratop Flanders)	60
Belgian Albums (Ultratop Wallonia)	43
Dutch Albums (Album Top 100)	48
French Albums (SNEP)	101
Scottish Albums (OCC)	95
UK Albums (OCC)	73
UK Independent Albums (OCC)	20
US Billboard 200	45
US Top Alternative Albums (Billboard)	8
US Top Rock Albums (Billboard)	14
