= Twins (Ty Segall album) =

Studio album by Ty Segall
- Released: October 9, 2012
- Recorded: December 2011– April 2012 at Bauer Mansion, San Francisco, California
- Studio: Bauer Mansion
- Genre: Psychedelic rock
- Length: 35:03
- Label: Drag City

Ty Segall chronology
Goodbye Bread (2011)	Twins (2012)	Sleeper (2013)

Singles from Twins
- 1. "The Hill" Released: September 4, 2012; 2. "Would You Be My Love" Released: January 22, 2013

Twins is the fifth studio album by San Francisco singer-songwriter Ty Segall. It marked his third and final release of the year 2012, preceded by Slaughterhouse by the Ty Segall Band and Hair in collaboration with White Fence. Still in Rock described this LP as being "the darkest of all Ty Segall albums". "The Hill" was released as the lead single of the album along with an official music video. In January 2013, Segall issued the second single off the album, "Would You Be My Love", along with the video for "Thank God for the Sinners".

== Reception ==
Professional ratings
Aggregate scores
Source	Rating
Metacritic	80/100
Review scores
Source	Rating

The release of the album was met with largely positive reviews from music critics.

NPR Music included the album on their 50 Favorite Albums of 2012, stating Twins is "...a monster album, with explosive guitars, thrashing beats and shredded blasts of insanely catchy hooks and turns."

BBC critic James Skinner called the album "...an admirable effort to capture the myriad facets of [Ty Segall's] sound in one rambunctious 35-minute blast." Skinner continues by stating, "Twins is a pile-driving yet playful record that loudly proclaims its influences, from Nirvana to The Doors, Hawkwind to The Stooges, Bowie to Lennon."

Pitchfork critic Evan Minsker gave the album an 8.0 on a 10.0 scale. He states that Twins sounds like a "grab bag," leaving some listeners wishing for Segall to "pick a sound and follow it for 12 tracks." However, Segall, along with "...engineer partner Eric Bauer...[deliver] a series of songs that, despite their aesthetic differences, flow very well." The review ends with Minsker claiming the album "...swerves, visiting territory well-tread, with a perspective that feels new, and knowing Segall, he probably won't make another album that sounds like it anytime soon."

NME's Lisa Wright gave the album a 9 out of 10, claiming the record has "a reckless spirit...that hasn't been overanalyzed, but with an intense flurry of ideas from someone in the absolute prime of their creativity." The positive remarks continue when Wright states, "[Twins] veers from psych-tinged, Syd Barrett wonks (on brilliant closer 'There Is No Tomorrow') to heavy glam riffs and sneering vocals (on highlights 'Inside Your Heart' and 'They Told Me Too') via straight-up garage-punk kicks ('You’re The Doctor'), all welded together with a mix of feckless hedonism and the careering energy of a freight train."

== Charts ==
During the week of November 13, 2012,Twins came in at number one on CMJ's album charts, a chart compiling the top radio plays from both college and non-commercial radio stations.

In CMJ's year end chart of 2012, Twins came in at number 11.

== Track listing ==
No.	Title	Length
1.	"Thank God for Sinners"	2:49
2.	"You're the Doctor"	2:01
3.	"Inside Your Heart"	3:40
4.	"The Hill"	2:39
5.	"Would You Be My Love"	2:15
6.	"Ghost"	4:13
7.	"They Told Me Too"	3:06
8.	"Love Fuzz"	3:34
9.	"Handglams"	3:19
10.	"Who Are You"	2:04
11.	"Gold on the Shore"	2:36
12.	"There Is No Tomorrow"	3:25
Total length:		35:03

== Personnel ==
Ty Segall wrote and performed every song on the album. The following musicians are also credited:

- Brigid Dawson – Vocals on "The Hill"
- Peter Grimm – Vocals on "Would You Be My Love" and "Gold On The Shore"
- Charles Moothart – Drums on "Ghost"
