= Slaughterhouse (Ty Segall Band album) =

Studio album by Ty Segall Band
- Released: June 26, 2012
- Recorded: February 18–21, 2012
- Genre: Garage rock; glam rock; noise rock; punk rock; psychedelic pop; rock and roll; space rock
- Length: 39:33
- Label: In the Red

Professional ratings
Aggregate scores
Source	Rating
AnyDecentMusic?	7.9/10
Metacritic	83/100
Review scores
Source	Rating
AllMusic	3.5/5 stars
The A.V. Club	B+
Chicago Tribune	3.5/4 stars
Consequence of Sound	4/5 stars
Drowned in Sound	7/10
MusicOMH	4/5 stars
Pitchfork	8.7/10
PopMatters	7/10
Spin	8/10
Uncut	8/10

Slaughterhouse is the debut studio album by American garage rock band Ty Segall Band, released on June 26, 2012, on In the Red Records. It is the only studio album fully credited to Segall's band, who often perform with him live.

== Background and recording ==
Regarding the recording process of Slaughterhouse and the role of the Ty Segall Band, Segall noted, "It’s the whole band. The Ty Segall Band. Like Twins, I played almost all of the parts myself. But yeah, we wanted to record a whole record with the band because it was so rad and so fun. It’s cool because we all wrote and played the songs together, it was totally collaborative. It was super fun! [...] I’d like to make five more records with those guys. Hopefully, throughout the years."

== Track listing ==
No.	Title	Length
1.	"Death"	4:26
2.	"I Bought My Eyes"	3:46
3.	"Slaughterhouse"	1:35
4.	"The Tongue"	2:41
5.	"Tell Me What's Inside Your Heart"	3:41
6.	"Wave Goodbye"	4:33
7.	"Muscle Man"	1:31
8.	"The Bag I'm In" (The Fabs)	2:45
9.	"Diddy Wah Diddy" (Bo Diddley)	2:24
10.	"Oh Mary"	1:37
11.	"Fuzz War"	10:23

== Recording ==
Chris Woodhouse recorded the album from February 18 to February 21 at The Hangar in Sacramento, California.

== Personnel ==
Ty Segall Band

- Ty Segall – lead vocals, guitar
- Emily Rose Epstein – drums
- Charles Moothart – guitar
- Mikal Cronin – bass guitar, backing vocals

== Charts ==
Chart (2012)	Peak position
US Top Current Albums (Billboard)	188
US Heatseekers Albums (Billboard)	8
US Independent Albums (Billboard)	44
US Top Hard Rock Albums (Billboard)	18
