= Emily Rose Epstein =

American drummer

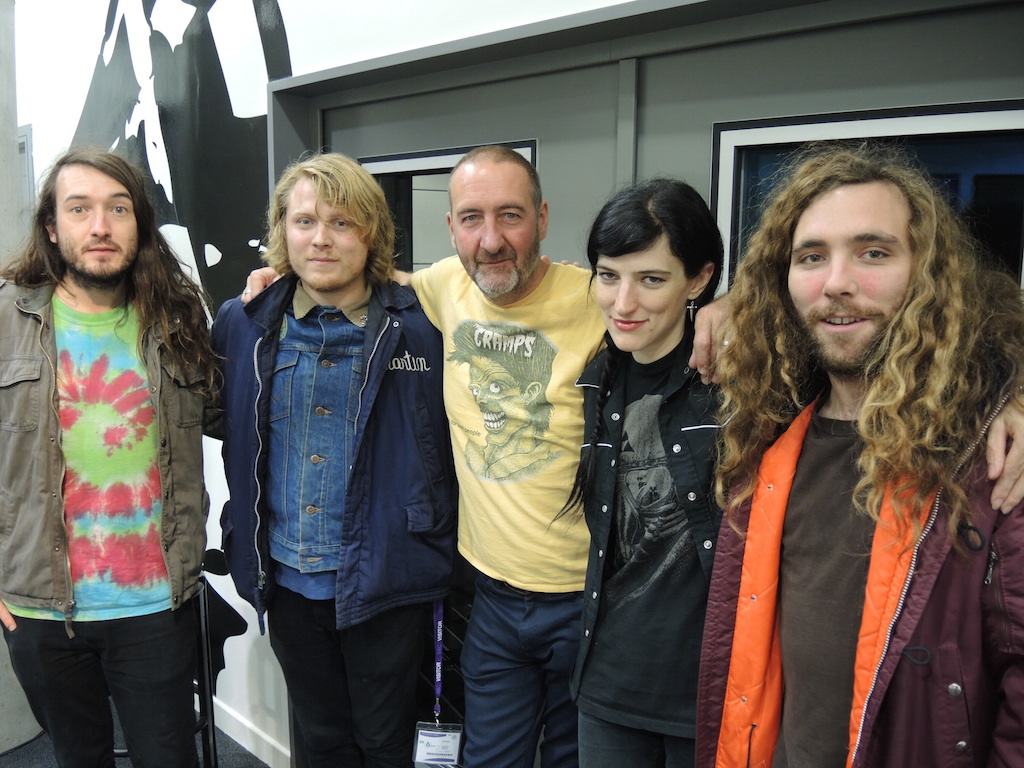
- Emily Rose Epstein (second from right) with the Ty Segall band and Marc Riley in 2014

Background information
- Genres: Garage rock, psychedelic rock, garage punk, noise rock, lo-fi, glam rock, country music
- Instrument: Drums
- Label: Drag City

Emily Rose Epstein is an American drummer. She is best known for her collaborations with the garage rock musicians Ty Segall and Mikal Cronin. She was a former member of Segall's live band, and a former member of Cronin's. She met Segall at the University of San Francisco.

Epstein started playing the drums as a child. When she was 13, she played drums for a University of California, Los Angeles band. She studied journalism at university.

In 2017, she reformed her country music band as the Blue Rose Rounders, now called Emily Rose & the Rounders.

== Discography ==
With Ty Segall Band

- Slaughterhouse (2012)
- Live in San Francisco (2014)
