= Emmett Kelly (musician) =

American musician

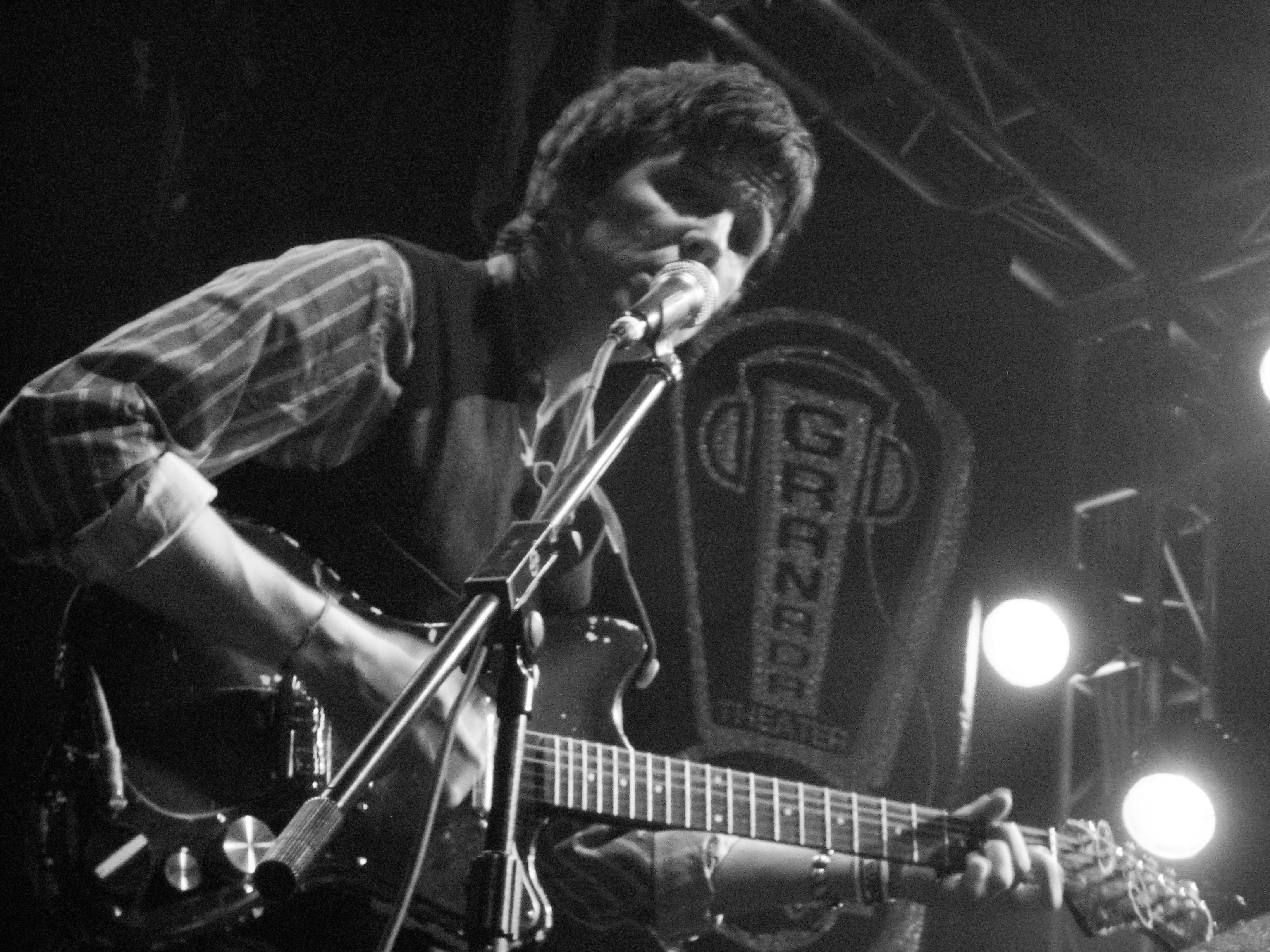
- Performing with Bonnie "Prince" Billy at The Granada Theater, June 6, 2009

Background information
- Origin: Van Nuys, California
- Genres: Experimental
- Years active: 2005–present
- Labels: Narnack Records, Disneyland Reform Party, Polyvinyl Record Co., Empty Cellar, Drag City, Tin Angel, The Blackest Rainbow, GOD?, Burger Records, In the Red Records

Emmett Kelly is an American singer, songwriter and guitarist. He is the primary songwriter and recording artist of The Cairo Gang, one half of The Double alongside drummer Jim White, one third of The CIA, one quarter of the Hard Quartet, and a founding member of Clinamen.

He has contributed vocal and instrumental work to a variety of international musical projects, appearing on recordings by the likes of Bonnie "Prince" Billy, Ty Segall, Angel Olsen, Azita, Joan of Arc, Edith Frost, Women and Children, John Webster Johns, Jeff Harms, Chicago poet/singer Marvin Tate, Matteah Baim, Japanese musician Takuma Watanabe, Earth Girl Helen Brown, Joshua Abrams and Rob Mazurek. Kelly has toured in several of the aforementioned acts in addition to with Baby Dee, CFM, Mikal Cronin, Sonny Smith, Beth Orton, and Terry Reid; and in other instances, performed live with Chan Marshall, Scott Tuma, Joan of Arc, and Pillars and Tongues. He is also one half of the band The Surf, The Sundried, and a founding member of Chicago's Psychojail.

== Early life, family and education ==
Emmett Kelly is from Van Nuys, California.

== Music ==
Emmett’s primary focus is his band, The Cairo Gang, which released its self-titled debut album on Narnack Records in 2006. The Disneyland Reform Party, a label started by Kelly and New York artist, Stasiu Tokarski, released 2008’s Twyxt Wyrd, which was subsequently released as a limited edition LP by Sheffield, UK’s The Blackest Rainbow. Following Twyxt Wyrd, Kelly released the home recorded Holy Clover EP on San Francisco’s Empty Cellar Records and Coventry, UK’s Tin Angel. Empty Cellar subsequently released 2012's The Corner Man, and 2013's Tiny Rebels, which marked a significant shift in approach.

Since 2013 he has been based in Los Angeles and has released albums for The Cairo Gang on Ty Segall's Drag City imprint, God? Records. The first, 2015's Goes Missing, was recorded largely in transit and even at times in his van. It includes performances by live Cairo Gang drummer Marc Riordan. 2016 saw the release of a collaboration of songs with composer Rob Mazurek entitled Alien Flower Sutra on International Anthem. In 2017, The Cairo Gang released their first "studio" album, Untouchable. Untouchable was recorded by Ty Segall, who also plays the drums. Bassist Shayde Sartin also contributes. 2017 also saw the release of Dawn Of The Double on In the Red Records. Kelly founded the improvisational ensemble, Clinamen, in 2018 with perennial collaborators Marc Riordan and Ben Boye. 2018 also saw the introduction of The C.I.A. (In the Red Records), an experimental punk trio fronted by Denée Segall and featuring Kelly and Ty Segall on electric bass guitars. In 2021, he began to release music as Emmett Kelly.

In 2016, Kelly was a member of garage rock musician Ty Segall's backing band The Muggers, formed following the release of the studio album, Emotional Mugger. Continuing to work with Segall, Kelly contributed to the recording of his ninth studio album, Ty Segall (2017), and is currently a member of his backing band, The Freedom Band.

In 2021, Kelly founded label haha along with the other members of Clinamen, primarily to release physical media of theirs and others in their fringe musical community. haha's main objective is to disassociate from digital media platforms and to exist entirely in physical form, including hardcopy newsletters.

The Cairo Gang has toured with notable acts such as The Fall, OCS, Baby Dee, and Pillars and Tongues.

Kelly has been a frequent collaborator of Will Oldham (A.K.A. Bonnie “Prince” Billy), and has lent his vocals and guitar to his recordings and performances since Oldham’s 2006 album, The Letting Go. In 2010 Drag City released the critically acclaimed album, The Wonder Show of the World, which featured compositional work by Kelly as The Cairo Gang, along with the single, Midday/You Win, and the 10’’, Island Brothers/New Wonder.

In 2024, Kelly started the band Hard Quartet, an underground rock supergroup including Jim White (drummer), Stephen Malkmus & Matt Sweeney.

== Discography ==
=== The Cairo Gang ===
- The Cairo Gang (Narnack Records, 2006)
- Twyxt Wyrd (The Disneyland Reform Party, 2008/The Blackest Rainbow, 2010)
- Holy Clover EP (Empty Cellar/Tin Angel, 2010)
- The Corner Man (Empty Cellar, 2012)
- Mixtape No. 1 (Teen River, 2013)
- Tiny Rebels (Empty Cellar / Burger Records, 2013)
- Live at The Owl (Parliament Tapes, 2013)
- Live at Burger Records Vol. 3 (Burger Records, 2014)
- Goes Missing (God? / Burger Records, 2015)
- Untouchable (God?, 2017)

=== Emmett Kelly ===
- The Feast of Brass Snakes (haha, 2021)

=== The Double ===
- Dawn of The Double - The Double (In the Red Records, 2017)

=== Clinamen ===
- Clinamen - Clinamen (JMY, 2018)

=== The C.I.A. ===
- The C.I.A. - The C.I.A. (In the Red Records, 2018)

=== Joshua Abrams and Natural Information Society ===
- Represencing (Eremite, 2012)
- Magnetoception (Eremite, 2015)
- Automaginary with Bitchin Bajas (Drag City, 2015)
- Simultonality (Eremite, 2017)

=== Ty Segall ===
- Emotional Mugger (2016)
- Ty Segall (2017)
- Freedom's Goblin (2018)
- Harmonizer (2021)

=== Collaborations ===
- The Wonder Show of the World - Bonnie "Prince" Billy & The Cairo Gang (Drag City, 2010)
- Midday/You Win 7" - Bonnie "Prince" Billy & The Cairo Gang (Drag City, 2010)
- Island Brothers/New Wonder 10" - Bonnie "Prince" Billy & The Cairo Gang (Drag City, 2011)
- We Love Our Hole/I'll Be Alright 7" - Bonnie "Prince" Billy & The Cairo Gang (Empty Cellar, 2014)
- Alien Flower Sutra - Rob Mazurek & Emmett Kelly (International Anthem, 2016)

=== Compilations ===
- 2005 Tour CD (Not On Label, 2005)
- Presence Under The Tree (Attack Nine, 2006)
- 13 Weeks of Summer (Attack 9, 2007)
- Joan of Arc Presents: Don't Mind Control (Polyvinyl Record Co., 2010)
- Green Leaves (Nick Drake Covered) ( Mojo Magazine, 2018)
