= Ty Segall (2008 album) =

Studio album by Ty Segall

Studio album by Ty Segall
- Released: December 9, 2008
- Genre: Garage rock, punk rock, lo-fi
- Length: 23:52
- Label: Castle Face Records, Burger Records

Ty Segall chronology
Ty Segall (2008)	Lemons (2009)

Ty Segall is the self-titled debut studio album by American garage rock musician Ty Segall, released on December 9, 2008, on Castle Face Records. A cassette edition was released on Burger Records.

== Background and release ==
Local garage rock musician John Dwyer, of Thee Oh Sees and Coachwhips, offered to release Ty Segall on his label, Castle Face Records. Dwyer befriended Segall after watching him perform with his then-band, The Traditional Fools, with a cast on his arm. Segall has stated that Dwyer's band Coachwhips were among his musical influences upon moving to San Francisco: "I moved [to San Francisco] in 2005 and was like, 'Oh man, I really like Coachwhips,' and they're not playing anymore." Regarding Dwyer's prominence within the city's music scene, he noted: "The music community is amazing here, super-tight, and John Dwyer's like the Mayor of San Francisco. Come down here, you'll see him riding his bike, drinking a beer, and he'll probably take you out to get a taco. He's the nicest guy in the world."

== Critical reception ==
Professional ratings
Review scores
Source	Rating
Pitchfork	6.7/10

In a mixed review for Pitchfork, Stephen M. Deusner wrote: "Ultimately, Ty Segall sounds like a test run, a document of an artist discovering what all he can do by himself, which makes moments like the whistled outro on "Watching You", so reminiscent of Sergio Leone, all the more endearing." Writing for Spin, Abigail Everdell praised the album, writing: "Warped sonics do nothing to diminish the impact of his vigorously nostalgic riff and stomp. From paranoid whistler "Watching You" to the huge, fuzzy pound of "The Drag", Segall thunders along with the timeless, impudently rowdy energy of a cement basement dance-off."

== Track listing ==
No.	Title	Length
1.	"Go Home"	2:07
2.	"Pretty Baby (You're So Ugly)"	1:18
3.	"The Drag"	2:39
4.	"Watching You"	1:44
5.	"Oh Mary"	1:35
6.	"Untitled"	2:11
7.	"Don't Do It"	2:05
8.	"You're Not Me"	2:41
9.	"Dating"	1:47
10.	"You Should Never Have Opened That Door" (The Ramones)	1:28
11.	"So Alone"	1:50
12.	"An Ill Jest"	2:14
