= MCII (album) =

Studio album by Mikal Cronin
- Released: May 7, 2013
- Genres: Garage rock; indie rock; power pop
- Length: 37:12
- Label: Merge

Mikal Cronin chronology
Mikal Cronin (2011)	MCII (2013)	MCIII

MCII is the second studio album by rock musician Mikal Cronin. It was released on May 7, 2013 by Merge Records.

== Critical reception ==
Professional ratings
Aggregate scores
Source	Rating
AnyDecentMusic?	8.1/10
Metacritic	84/100
Review scores
Source	Rating
AllMusic	3.5/5 stars
The A.V. Club	A−
Consequence of Sound	4.5/5 stars
Mojo	4/5 stars
The Observer	4/5 stars
Pitchfork	8.4/10
Q	3/5 stars
Slant Magazine	4/5 stars
Spin	9/10
Uncut	9/10

MCII has received acclaim from music critics. At Metacritic, which assigns a "weighted average" score out of 100 to ratings reviews from selected mainstream critics, the album has a score of 84, based on 24 reviews. In addition, AnyDecentMusic? has a rating of 8.1 out of 10 from selected mainstream critics, and that is based upon 22 reviews.

At Spin, David Bevan noted that Cronin "delivers a performance that's both deeply confident and convincingly vulnerable". Michael Roffman at Consequence of Sound told that in a year with excellent releases that this one "has the punch and wit to stick around with the best" because it is "a blast." At Uncut, Peter Watts found that the release "hits you with the immediacy of a record that you're listening to for the first time but feel like you've already heard a thousand times and yet still aren't bored of." At Blurt, Jennifer Kelly called the album "an immediate rush and a lasting pleasure." Martyn Young at musicOMH wrote that "perhaps a risk for Cronin to take a partial step away from hazy psychedelic rock in favour of plaintive emoting, but it's a risk he navigates extremely successfully." At Mojo, Stevie Chick affirmed that Cronin "delivers timeless, classic pop that evades clichés." Kyle Fowle of Slant Magazine alluded to how "with MCII, Cronin sheds much of the fuzz for a more balanced and polished approach, resulting in one of the most consistent and rewarding albums of the year so far." At Now, Richard Trapunski felt that "the melodies sound effortless, but there’s complexity under the surface." Kitty Empire of The Observer called this album "an ozone high." Tim Sendra of AllMusic proclaimed the release as being "a step forward from his debut and shows off a guy with enough talent to step out from behind Segall's shadow and make it on his own." At Under the Radar, Hays Davis evoked that "MCII is the sound of someone who moved on and found solid ground."

Austin L. Ray of The A.V. Club graded the album an A−, and told that Cronin's songwriting is "a joy to behold" on the album, and found that "rarely does a songwriter nail his voice as successfully as Cronin has here" because he softened it up. At Filter, Kurt Orzeck gave the album an 85%, and he called the effort an "extended journal entry in which a very young man is trying to muster the courage to live his life", which Orzeck affirmed that "by the last song, he has found it". Evan Minsker of Pitchfork rated this an 8.4-out-of-ten, and called it the best new music for its debut week, which he found that he gets the balance just right on of pop and power that is Cronin's "most fully realized, beautifully arranged, and well-crafted work to date." At Paste, John Hendrickson rated the album an 8.2-out-of-ten, and highlighted that "these questions are more satisfying than their answers." PopMatters' Arnold Pan rated the album an 8-out-of-ten, and told that Cronin is "redefining what the term [garage rock] means altogether", which he does it with "virtuoso execution", so this means the artist is "refining his craft and honing his musical perspective into something that defines a category all its own." At Exclaim!, Duncan Boyd rated the album an 8-out-of-ten, and found Cronin "sounds invigorated yet somehow apprehensive about his new place", and noticed how the album "errs just enough on the side of caution to create a fantastic pop record." Carol Williamson rated the album a 7-out-of-ten at DIY, and felt that the release "can jump from sound to sound isn’t a surprise; but at times it does make for a slightly schizophrenic listen." Lastly, Pretty Much Amazing's Denise Lu graded the album a B+, and proclaimed that "as an album set out to reappropriate pop rock, MCII succeeds."

== Track listing ==
All tracks are written by Mikal Cronin.

Tracklist
No.	Title	Length
1.	"Weight"	3:50
2.	"Shout It Out"	2:55
3.	"Am I Wrong"	2:33
4.	"See It My Way"	3:52
5.	"Peace of Mind"	4:06
6.	"Change"	3:43
7.	"I'm Done Running from You"	2:50
8.	"Don't Let Me Go"	3:31
9.	"Turn Away"	5:07
10.	"Piano Mantra"	4:45
Total length:		37:12

== Chart performance ==
Chart (2013)	Peak position
US Billboard 200	174
US Heatseekers Albums (Billboard)	3
US Independent Albums (Billboard)	31
US Top Rock Albums (Billboard)	46
US Indie Store Album Sales (Billboard)	18
