= Ty Segall =

American musician and producer (born 1987)

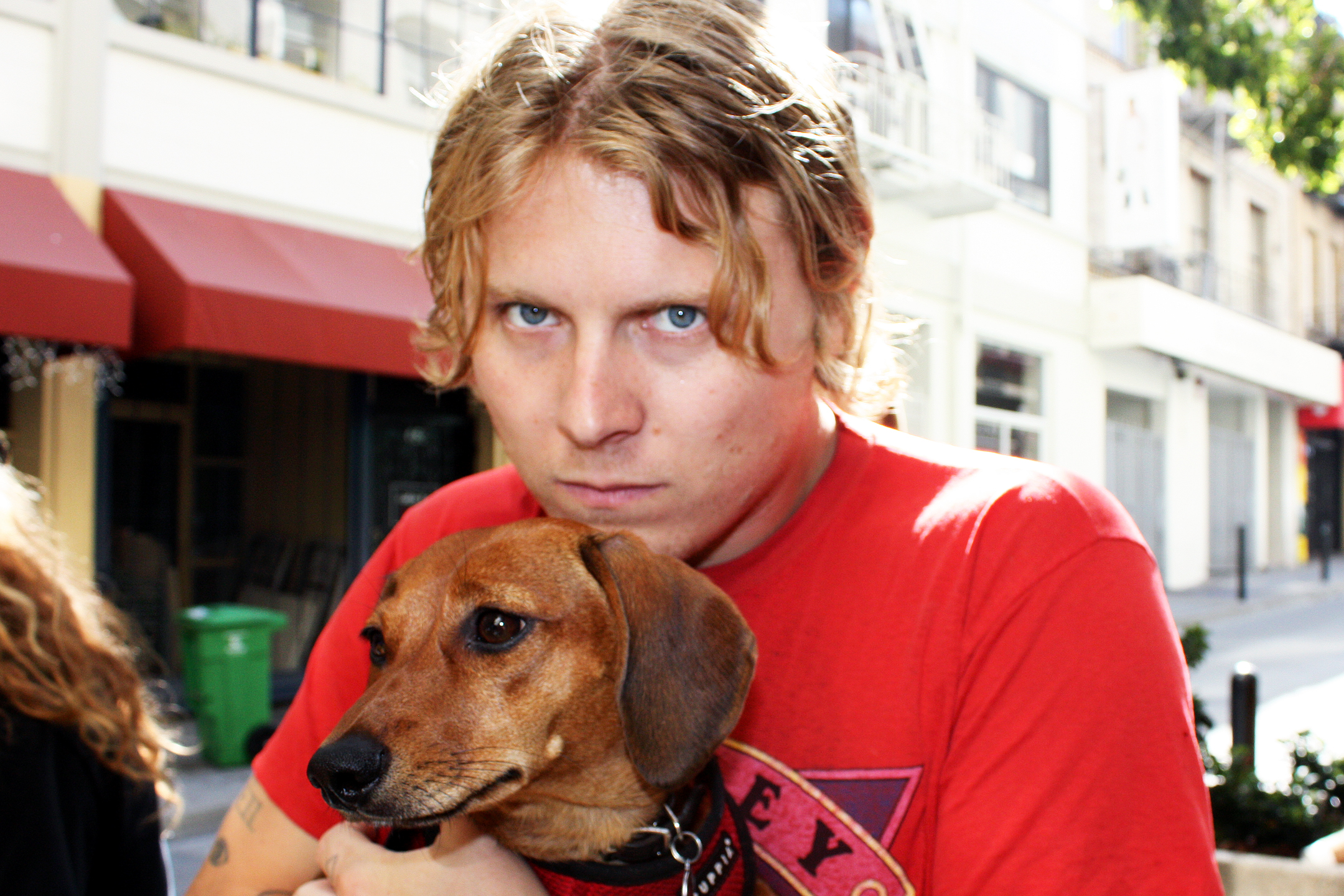
- Segall posing with his dog, Fanny, in 2016

Background information
- Also known as: Sloppo
- Born: Ty Garrett Segall; June 8, 1987 (age 39)
- Origin: Laguna Beach, California, U.S.
- Genres: Garage rock revival; psychedelic rock; indie rock; punk rock; heavy metal; noise rock; blues; folk
- Occupations: Musician; singer-songwriter; producer
- Instruments: Vocals; guitar; drums; bass guitar; keyboards
- Years active: 2008–present
- Labels: Goner; Wizard Mountain; CastleFace; Chocolate Covered; Goodbye Boozy; Drag City; Burger; In The Red; Famous Class
- Website: ty-segall.com

Ty Garrett Segall (born June 8, 1987) is an American multi-instrumentalist, singer-songwriter and record producer. He is best known for his solo career, during which he has released seventeen studio albums alongside various EPs, singles, and collaborative albums. Segall is also a member of the bands Fuzz, Broken Bat, the CIA, GØGGS, Wasted Shirt and Freckle. He is a former member of the Traditional Fools, Epsilons, Party Fowl, Sic Alps, and the Perverts.

During live performances, Segall is currently backed by the Freedom Band – consisting of Mikal Cronin (bass, backing vocals), Emmett Kelly (guitar, backing vocals), Ben Boye (keyboards) and Evan Burrows (drums). Former members of the Freedom Band include longtime friend and collaborator Charles Moothart (drums) and Shannon Lay (guitar, backing vocals). His previous backing bands have been the Ty Segall Band – consisting of Cronin, Moothart (on guitar), and Emily Rose Epstein (drums) – as well as the Muggers, a high concept band formed in 2016 and consisting of Cronin, Kelly, Kyle Thomas (guitar), Wand's Cory Hanson (keyboards, guitar) and Burrows (drums). Segall has also played with the Sleeper Band, consisting of Sean Paul (guitar), Andrew Luttrell (bass) and Moothart (drums).

== Early life ==
Segall is the adopted son of a Laguna Beach, California, family; his father is a lawyer and his mother is an artist. Segall began surfing at age ten; he was in high school when he became interested in music. He describes his teenage self as emotionally unstable, a "very existential eighteen-year-old drinker", whose instability was temporarily mended by the escapism music provided him. During Segall's last two years at Laguna Beach High School, MTV filmed the reality series Laguna Beach: The Real Orange County there. Segall blamed the show for driving away his hometown's unique culture of hippies, artists and surfers because "they can't afford to live there now. And you can't get any of that rad, grimy shit back." Segall and his high school friend Mikal Cronin parodied the TV show in a 2007 music video by their grunge band, Epsilons. After high school, Segall attended the University of San Francisco where he received a degree in Media Studies. After graduating, he worked eight months constructing grow boxes for cannabis plants, but since then has been focused entirely on music.

== Recording career ==
=== Early career (2008–2011) ===
Segall began his recording career as a part-time musician in various underground bands in Orange County and the San Francisco Bay Area including Epsilons and Evil Robots, before beginning a solo career in 2008. Segall's first solo release was the cassette Horn The Unicorn, released on the Wizard Mountain label (later re-released by HBSP-2X on vinyl record). Around the same time, Wizard Mountain also released a split cassette featuring Segall and the band Superstitions entitled Halfnonagon.

After Segall befriended John Dwyer, of Thee Oh Sees and Coachwhips, Dwyer offered to release Segall's debut solo album, Ty Segall (2008), on his label, Castle Face Records. The two became firm friends, with Segall noting: "The music community is amazing here, super-tight, and John Dwyer's like the Mayor of San Francisco. Come down here, you'll see him riding his bike, drinking a beer, and he'll probably take you out to get a taco. He's the nicest guy in the world." In a 2016 interview, In The Red Records founder Larry Hardy talked about the possibility of a band with Segall and Dwyer.

Ty Segall was followed by a string of limited 7" singles and a split LP with the band Black Time. In 2009, the album Lemons was released by Goner Records to positive reviews. This release was followed by another string of successful and limited 7" singles and the LP Reverse Shark Attack, an album with longtime collaborator Mikal Cronin. The studio album Melted followed in 2010; in 2011, Segall signed to Drag City and released the album Goodbye Bread in June.

=== Hair, Slaughterhouse and Twins (2012) ===
2012 saw the release of three full-length albums by Segall: Hair, with White Fence, released in April; Slaughterhouse, recorded with his touring band and released June 26; as well as one solo album, Twins, released on October 9. This last album spawned two singles: "The Hill" and "Would You Be My Love?" When questioned about his LP Twins, Segall stated; "I want to do a total glam Stooges-meets-Hawkwind or Sabbath, something like that. I think that would be super fun. I want to throw people off. I want to make a really heavy record: evil, evil space rock. Put a little Satan in space and you got the sound."

=== Fuzz, Sleeper and Manipulator (2013–2015) ===
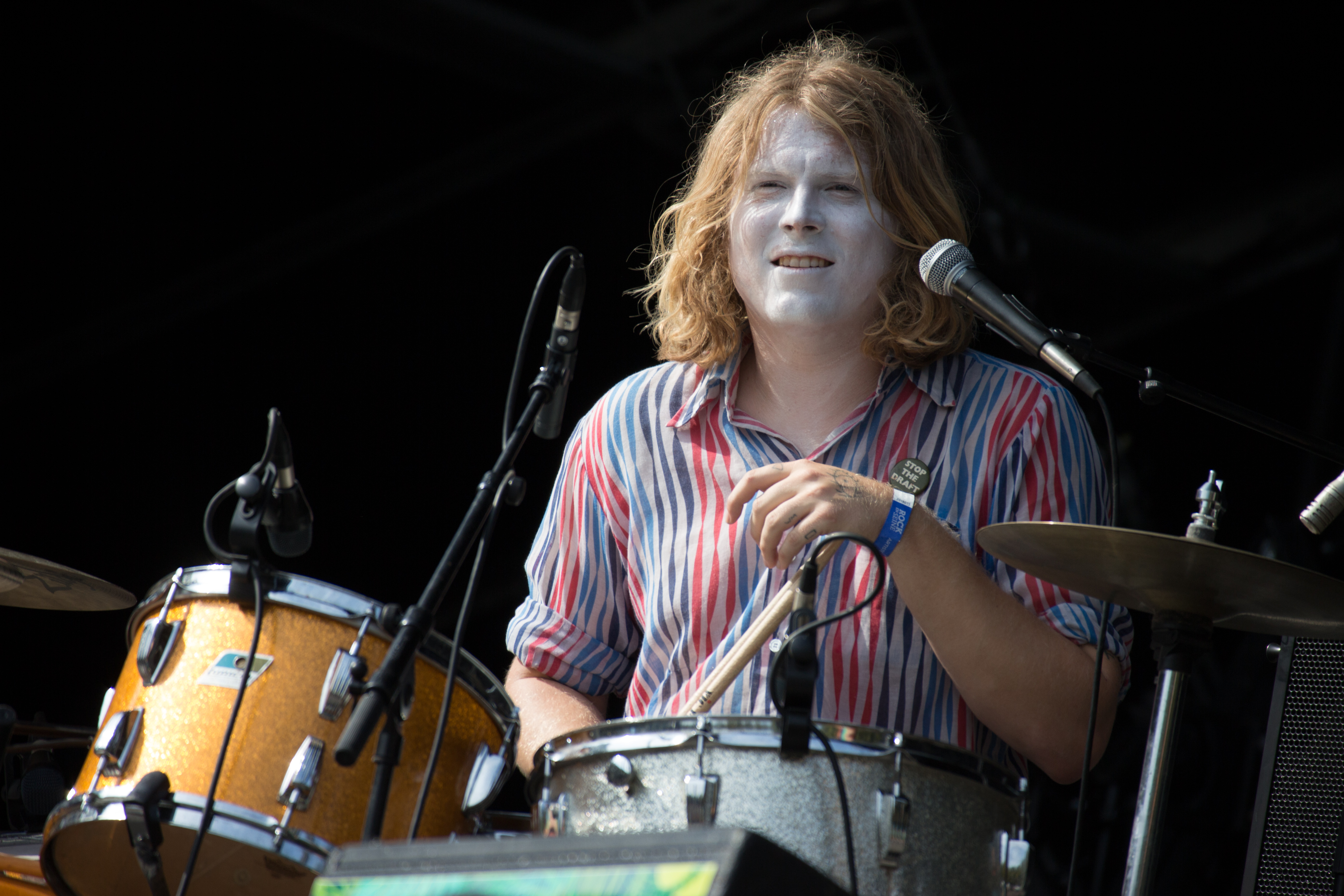
Segall performing with Fuzz in 2015.

In 2013, Segall, bandmate Charles Moothart and Roland Cosio formed a new hard rock outfit called Fuzz, releasing three 7" singles. A full-length album, titled Fuzz, was recorded in May and released on October 1, 2013. Previous to this release, Segall released a primarily acoustic solo album, Sleeper, in August. Largely influenced by the death of his father and subsequent estrangement from his mother, Sleeper received positive reviews from such media outlets as Pitchfork and Consequence of Sound. In November/December 2013, Segall performed at the final "holiday camp" edition of the All Tomorrow's Parties festival in Camber Sands, England, UK.

In 2014, Segall released Manipulator, his first to integrate some psych music. Segall toured in support of the release, with support from Wand, whom he had signed to his label

In 2015, Segall produced the debut album by Peacers, featuring his former Sic Alps bandmate Mike Donovan. A new EP, Mr. Face, was released on Famous Class, and a second Fuzz album, II, was released in October 2015.

=== Emotional Mugger and The Muggers (2016) ===
In November 2015, Segall announced a new studio album, Emotional Mugger, by sending a VHS tape to Pitchfork. Subsequently, a website was also created, www.emotionalmugger.com, that would feature a short video of Segall explaining the concept of emotional mugging and a video of Segall and his band wearing baby masks and playing a live version of a song from the new album. This latter video also offered a hotline number to call. The number, 1-800-281-2968, features a brief message from Segall. The video also introduces The Muggers, which, upon the album's release, Segall formed as a backing band. The band consisted of Mikal Cronin (bass, sax), Kyle Thomas (guitar), Emmett Kelly (guitar), and Wand's Cory Hanson (keyboards, guitar) and Evan Burrows (drums). During live performances, Segall adopted the name of Sloppo while wearing a baby mask. Still in Rock described this LP as being Segall's first experimental rock album.

=== Ty Segall, Freedom's Goblin, First Taste and The Freedom Band (2017–2019) ===
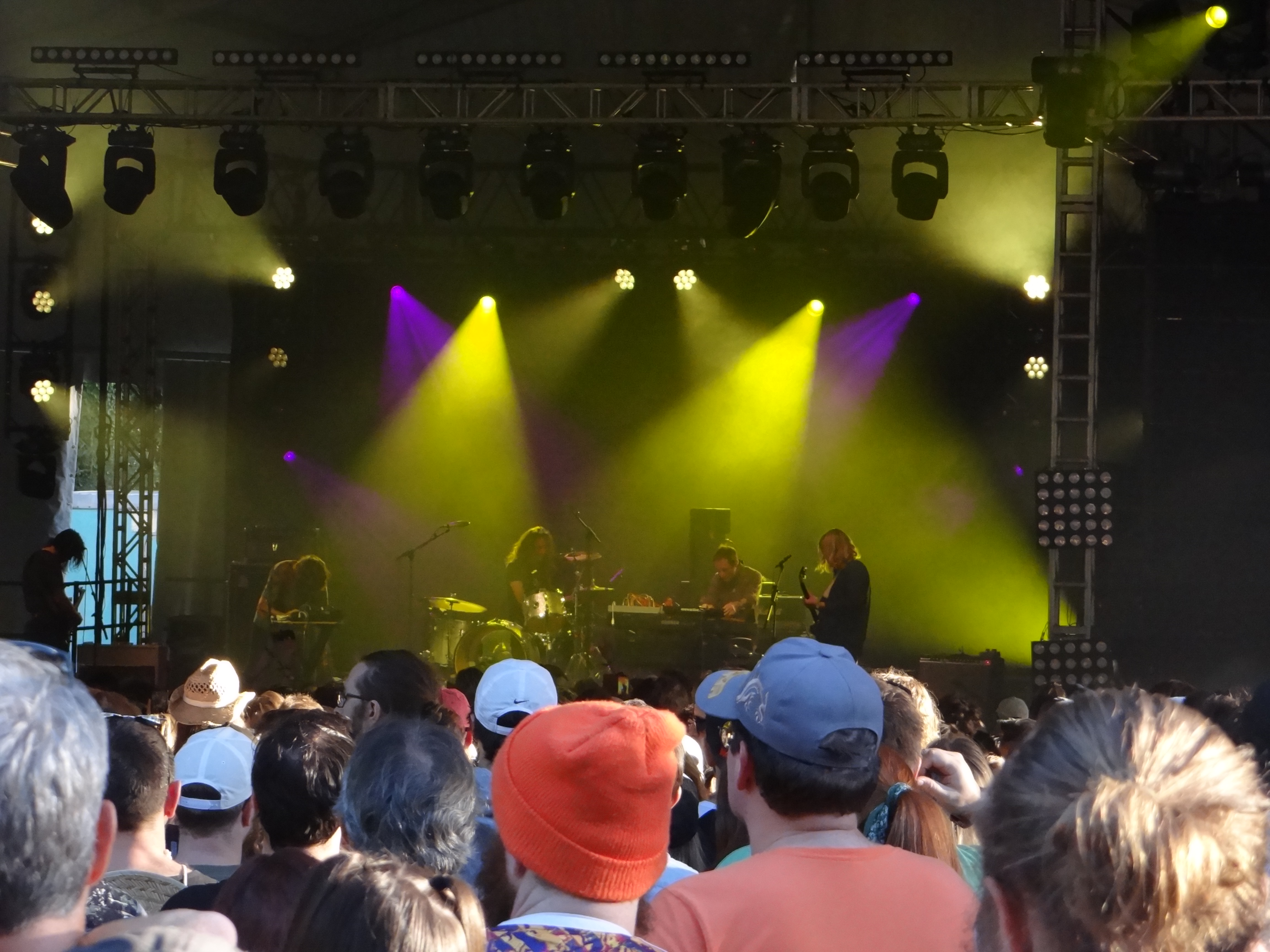
Segall performing with the Freedom Band in 2021

In November 2016, Segall announced the release of his ninth studio album, Ty Segall. The album was to be his second self-titled release, following the release of his eponymously titled debut album in 2008. It was preceded by the release of the single "Orange Color Queen" in November 2016. Later, the song "Break A Guitar" was released to streaming platforms on January 19, 2017. Also following the album's release, Segall began touring with the backing band that recorded the album, which was now named The Freedom Band.

In the album, Segall displays his ability to play the full repertoire of rock; in one album he goes from T. Rex style glam rock, to Bob Dylan-esque country rock, to the breadth and social commentary of Pink Floyd, to hardcore punk, to a jam band sound. Segall describes the record as a "song album"—one without a singular concept or sound. The ten-minute-long centerpiece of the album is "Warm Hands (Freedom Returned)", which starts with Segall's characteristic punk-inspired thrashing guitar, but becomes open and spacey around the five-minute mark, before reprising the melody from "Freedom" (the second track on the album). Comparisons have been drawn between this most recent album and Segall's 2012 release Twins, which was also a compilation of Segall's various influences and styles up to that point in his career. Segall released the album Freedom's Goblin on January 26, 2018.

In August 2019, Segall released his twelfth studio album, First Taste, consisting of songs recorded without the use of guitars. Segall and the Freedom Band played the album on full on its accompanying tour, alongside 'full album' performances of several previous releases.

Segall also composed the theme music for three Comedy Central television programs, The Opposition with Jordan Klepper (2017), and Corporate (2018), and Klepper.

=== Harmonizer and "Hello, Hi" (2020–2022) ===
On March 31, 2020, Segall Smeagol, a set of covers of six tracks from Harry Nilsson's album Nilsson Schmilsson, was released on Bandcamp.

Segall surprise-released his thirteenth studio album, Harmonizer on August 3, 2021. Co-produced by Cooper Crain, the album featured performances from the Freedom Band and Segall's wife, Denée Segall. In early 2022, he released a soundtrack album to the film Whirlybird, which had previously competed in the US Documentary category at the 2020 Sundance Film Festival.

Recorded at Segall's home studio, his fourteenth studio album, "Hello, Hi", was released on July 22, 2022. The album's press release noted: "Hello, Hi is expansively rendered by Ty, mostly by himself, at home. The isolation suits the songs: you're only ever as 'at home' as you are with yourself in the mirror."

=== Three Bells, Love Rudiments and Possession (2024–present) ===
Segall released Three Bells on January 26, 2024, his fifteenth studio album. The album was well received by critics. Later that same year, Segall released the instrumental album, Love Rudiments, on August 30, 2024. His seventeenth album, Possession, was released on May 30, 2025. He released the EP "Live" "At" "The" "BBC" in January 2026. His album Chrome was released on August 28, 2026.

== Musical style ==
Segall's music has been described as garage rock, garage rock revival, lo-fi, indie rock and psychedelic rock. Segall has stated in interviews that his favorite band of all time is Hawkwind. Notable glam rockers David Bowie and Marc Bolan heavily influenced Segall's early career, as well as heavy rock and punk bands such as Black Sabbath, Kiss, The Stooges, and Black Flag (especially in the Ty Segall Band). However, over time Segall's output has gotten mellower on albums such as Goodbye Bread and Sleeper, taking cues from Neil Young, The Byrds, The West Coast Pop Art Experimental Band, The Beatles (even being compared to John Lennon vocally on some of his albums), and early T. Rex (when they were known as Tyrannosaurus Rex) and Grateful Dead. A big source of his inspiration also comes from the San Francisco garage and indie rock scenes, from which he has named bands such as Thee Oh Sees (being personal friends with frontman John Dwyer).

In 2024, he performed the song, "Animals are Sleeping", from the children's television in Yo Gabba Gabbaland!.

== GOD? Records ==
Segall has his own record label imprint on Drag City called GOD? Records. In 2014, Segall signed fellow-garage rock act Wand to the label and subsequently invited them to join him on tour.

== Personal life ==
Segall resides in Los Angeles, California.

== Discography ==
Studio albums

- Ty Segall (2008)
- Lemons (2009)
- Melted (2010)
- Goodbye Bread (2011)
- Slaughterhouse (2012) (as Ty Segall Band)
- Twins (2012)
- Sleeper (2013)
- Manipulator (2014)
- Emotional Mugger (2016)
- Ty Segall (2017)
- Freedom's Goblin (2018)
- First Taste (2019)
- Harmonizer (2021)
- Hello, Hi (2022)
- Three Bells (2024)
- Love Rudiments (2024)
- Possession (2025)
- Chrome (2026)

Collaborative studio albums

- Hair (2012) (with White Fence)
- Joy (2018) (with White Fence)
