= Mikal Cronin =

American musician and songwriter

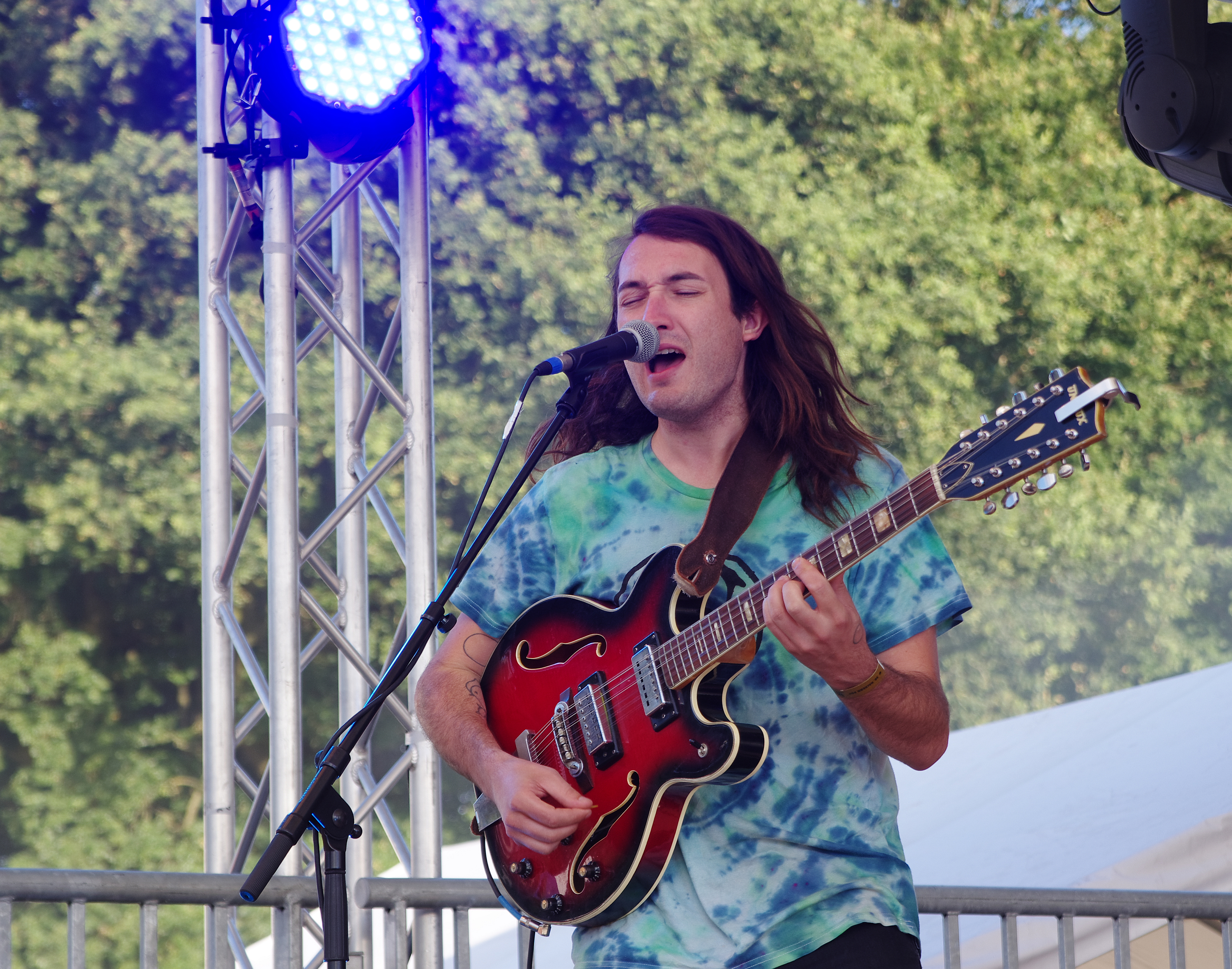
- Mikal Cronin at Haldern Pop 2013

Background information
- Born: Michael Patrick Cronin; December 26, 1985 (age 40); Laguna Beach, California, U.S.
- Genres: Alternative rock, indie rock
- Occupations: Musician, singer-songwriter, multi-instrumentalist
- Instruments: Vocals, bass guitar, guitar, saxophone, drums, percussion, keyboards
- Labels: Goodbye Boozy, Trouble in Mind, Goner, Merge Records

Michael "Mikal" Patrick Cronin (born December 26, 1985) is an American musician and songwriter. He has released four solo albums and several singles. Cronin was a member of the bands Okie Dokie, Epsilons, Party Fowl and Moonhearts, and is a regular and longtime member of Ty Segall's live band, contributing bass guitar, backing vocals and saxophone; he has also released an album and a single in collaboration with Segall. Cronin earned his Bachelor of Fine Arts in music from California Institute of the Arts.

== Discography ==
=== As a solo artist ===
==== Studio albums ====
- Mikal Cronin – CD/LP (2011; Trouble in Mind)
- MCII – CD/LP (2013; Merge Records)
- MCIII – CD/LP (2015; Merge Records)
- Seeker – CD/LP (2019; Merge Records)

==== Singles/EPs ====
- Gone – 7" (2010; Goodbye Boozy Records)
- Tide – 7" (2011; Goner Records)
- Violitionist Acoustic Sessions 7" (2012: Turntable Kitchen)

=== Collaborations ===
==== With Ty Segall ====
- Pop Song – 7" (2009; Goodbye Boozy Records)
- Reverse Shark Attack – Cassette/LP (2009; Burger Records issued cassette only / Kill Shaman Records issued LP only)
- Group Flex (Contribute Tracks: Fame; Suffragette City) 6 x Flexi Disc/Book (2011; Castle Face)
- Emotional Mugger (2016)
- Ty Segall (2017)
- Freedom's Goblin (2018)
- First Taste (2019)
- Harmonizer (2021)

=== As part of other bands ===
==== Epsilons ====
- Evil Robots – CD/EP (2005, Modern Sleeze)
- Epsilons / Hips (split with Hips) – 7" (2006; olFactory Records)
- Epsilons – CD/LP (2006; Retard Disco issued CD only / Young Cubs issued LP only)
- Killed 'Em Deader 'N A Six Card Poker Hand – CD/LP (2007; Retard Disco issued CD only / HBSP-2X issued LP only)

==== Charlie and the Moonhearts ====
- Charlie and The Moonhearts – Cassette (2007, Red Handed Recordings)
- I Think You're Swell – 7" (2007, Goodbye Boozy Records)
- Drop In Drop Out – 7" (2008, Tic Tac Totally)
- Thunderbeast – Cassette (2008, Telephone Explosion)
- Real Hot Breakers – 7" (2009, Trouble in Mind)
- Charlie & The Moonhearts / Teen Anger (split with Teen Anger) – LP (2009; Telephone Explosion Records)
- Moonhearts – LP (2010, Tic Tac Totally)
- Split (with Ty Segall / CoCoComa / The White Wires) – 7" (2010; Trouble in Mind)

==== Party Fowl ====
- Party Fowl – 7" (2008; Post Present Medium)
- STD's – 7" (2008; Goodbye Boozy Records)

==== Okie Dokie ====
- Badhammer – 7" (2009; Goodbye Boozy Records)
- Okie Dokie – 10" (2009; Aagoo)
- Sorrow/Jubilance – 7" Split with Nü Sensae (2010; Swill Children)

==== Ty Segall Band ====
- Slaughterhouse – CD/LP (2012, In The Red Records)

==== Thee Oh Sees ====
- Putrifiers II (2012)
- Drop (2014)
