= Burger Records discography =

- Studio albums: 500+
- Cassettes: 400+
- Vinyl: 50+

The following is the discography of Burger Records, an independent punk and rock label and store based in Fullerton, California. Uniquely, most of the releases are on cassettes, and artists include both smaller regional bands and larger well-known acts such as Dave Grohl and the Go.

== Catalog ==
Source: BurgerRecords/discog (May 2013)

=== 1–99 ===
No.	Artist	Title	Type
001	Thee Makeout Party!	2EZ2LUVU	7"
001.5	Audacity/Thee	Split	7"
002	Audacity	Power Drowning	LP/CD
003	Thee Makeout Party!	Play Pretend	CASS
004	Audacity	The Anne Frank Tape	CASS
005	Devon Williams	Careerfree	CASS
006	The Resonars	That Evil Drone	LP/CD
007	Traditional Fools	S/T	CASS
008	The Go	Howl on The Haunted Beat	CASS
009	Apache	Boomtown Gems	CASS
010	Stan McMahon	The Stan McMahon Band	CASS
011	White Night	Tour EP	CASS
012	Nobunny	Raw Romance	CASS/LP/CD
013	Sir Lord Von Raven	Please Throw Me Back in the Ocean	CASS
014	Shatzi & Hazeltine	When Yr Alone	7"
015	Fever B	The Lonely Sailor Sessions	
016	King Tuff	Was Dead	CASS/LP
017	Pipsqueak	Debut	CASS
018	Harlem	Free Drugs ;)	CASS
019	Poppets	Live Pa Utmarken	CASS
020	Ty Segall	S/T	CASS
021	Impediments	S/T	CASS
022	Garbo's Daughter	Goes Pop!	CASS
023	Box Elders	Alice and Friends	CASS
024	Nobunny	Love Visions	CASS
025	Hunx and His Punx	Gay Singles	CASS
026	The Pizazz	Get Out of My House	CASS
027	Jaill	There's No Sky (Oh My My)	CASS
028	Audacity	Seventh Kevin	CASS
029	Bombon	Party con...	CASS
030	Danny James	PEAR	CASS/LP/CD
031	Mikal Cronin/Ty Segall	Reverse Shark Attack	CASS
032	Beatmark	S/T	CASS
033	Thee Makeout Party!	7 New Songs	CASS
034	Jaill	There's No Sky (Oh My My)	LP
035	The Cleaners from Venus	Midnight Cleaners	CASS
036	The Cleaners from Venus	In the Golden Autumn	CASS
037	The Cleaners from Venus	Under Wartime Conditions	CASS
038	Personal and the Pizzas	Raw Pie	CASS
039	Clorox Girls	Demos, Rarities & Early 7"s	CASS
040	Shannon and the Clams	I Wanna Go Home	CASS
041	Ty Segall	S/T / Lemons	CASS
042	Apache	Radical Sabbatical	LP
043	Black Lips	Let It Bloom	CASS
044	Black Lips	Good Bad Not Evil	CASS
045	Black Lips	200 Million Thousand	CASS
046	Stoned at Heart	Part Tracks Vol. 1	CASS
047	Cumstain	Cumstain	CASS/LP
048	Jacuzzi Boys	No Seasons	CASS
049	Cosmonauts	S/T	CASS
050	The Go	Box Set	CASS
051	Bad Sports	S/T	CASS
052	Conspiracy of Owls	S/T LP/	CASS
053	Todd Congelliere	Clown Sounds LP/	CASS
054	Nobunny	Love Visions / Raw Romance	CASS
055	Poppets	Complete Singles Vol 1	CASS
056	Bare Wires	Seeking Love	CASS
057	Miss Chain and the Broken Heels	On A Bittersweet Ride	CASS
058	Moonhearts	S/T	CASS
059	The Beat	Live 1979	CASS
060	Almighty Do Me A Favor	Time Spent	CASS
061	MMOSS	i LP/	CASS
062	The Resonars	S/T & Bright and Dark	CASS
063	The Resonars	Lunar Kit and Nonetheless Blue	CASS
064	Clive Tanaka	Y Su Orquesta LP/	CASS
065	Gentleman Jesse	Singles and Rarities	CASS
066	Gestapo Khazi	Written in the Will	CASS
067	The Quick	Untold Rock Stories	CASS
068	Milk N Cookies	Album/Live 1975	CASS
069	Mandy + Jason	For A Time	CASS
070	White Night	Immortal	CASS
071	Davila 666	S/T	CASS
072	Thee Oh Sees	Cool Death/Sucks Blood	CASS
073	Jaill	How We Burn	CASS
074	Television Personalities	I Was A Mod Before You Was A Mod	CASS
075	Dwight Twilley	Green Blimp LP/	CASS
076	The Cleaners from Venus	English Electric LP/	CASS
077	Happy Birthday	S/T	CASS
078	Jail Weddings	Love is Lawless	CASS
079	OFF!	First Four EPs	CASS
080	Soviet	We Are Eyes, We Are Builders	CASS
081	Feeding People	Peace, Victory & The Devil	CASS/LP
082	The Rantouls	In The Village of Rantoul	CASS
083	Mean Jeans	Are You Serious? + 5 Singles	CASS
084	Gravys Drop	For the Love of Gravy	CASS
085	Peach Kelli Pop	S/T	CASS
086	Magic Jake And The Power Crystals	S/T	CASS/LP
087	Cosmonauts	New Psychic Denim	CASS
088	Summer Twins	EP	CASS
089	Audacity	Mellow Cruisers	LP
090	The Resonars	Bright & Dark	LP
091	Devon Williams	Euphoria	CASS
092	Apple Brains	Get Fruity!	CASS
093	Pangea	Living Dummy	CASS/LP
094	Andy Human	Red Plastic	CASS
095	Beaunoise	Ambient One	CASS
096	Wonder Wheel	Total Bundy	CASS
097	The Tough Shits	S/T LP/	CASS
098	Underground Railroad to Candyland	Knows Your Sins	CASS
099	Infinity People	In Love With The Light	CASS/LP

=== 100–199 ===
No.	Artist	Title	Format
100	Burger Records	Burger's 2012 Calendar	CAL
101	Dwarves	Born Again	CASS
102	Blue Jungle	Loveless Youth	CASS
103	Crystal Antlers	Two Way Mirror / Son Of The Mirror	CASS
104	Hunx and His Punx	Too Young To Love	CASS
105	Goochi Boiz	Oops	CASS
106	Veloura Caywood	14 Years	CASS
107	The Resonars	S/T	LP
108	The Stalkers	Full Blown LP/	CASS
109	nick nicely	Lythergia	CASS/LP
110	Salsa Chips	Debut	CASS
111	Groundislava	S/T	CASS
112	MOM	Greatest Shits	CASS
113	QUILT	EP	CASS
114	Garbo's Daughter	West Coast Summer Tour Tape	CASS
115	Lovely Bad Things	New Ghost / Old Waves	CASS
116	White Mystery	Best Of	CASS
117	John Wesley Coleman	Steal My Mind / Bad Lady Goes To Jail	CASS
118	Beaunoise	Beeptunes	CASS
119	The Bank	I Love Each Other	CASS
120	Nodzzz	S/T / Innings	CASS
121	Dios	S/T	CASS
122	Natural Child	1971	CASS
123	Crazy Band	Fuck You	CASS
124	Cowabunga Babes	Going Nowhere	CASS
125	Dead Ghosts	S/T	CASS
126	Pine Hill Haints	The Evening Star	CASS
127	Meercaz	S/T	CASS
128	Marvelous Darlings	Single Life	CASS
129	Black Lips	Arabia Mountain	CASS
130	Deeper Peace	S/T	CASS
131	Thee Oh Sees	Masters Bedroom / Help	CASS
132	Tomorrows Tulips	Eternally Teenage	CASS
133	MHV	Thoughts of An Ordinary Man	CASS
134	Meow Twins	S/T	CASS
135	Summer Twins	S/T	LP
136	Nobunny	First Blood	CASS
137	The Vomettes	S/T	CASS
138	Forever Baby	White People	CASS
139	Heavy Cream	Danny	CASS
140	Capt. Slookie and the Rogue Squadron	Controlled Chaos	CASS
141	Night Beats	S/T	CASS
142	Peter Daltrey	Tales of Ordinary Madness	CASS
143	Dominant Legs	Invitation	CASS
144	The Tandoori Knights	Curry Up It's The…	CASS
145	Cosmonauts	S/T / New Psychic Denim	CASS
146	Burnt Ones	Black Teeth and Golden Tongues	CASS
147	Live at Burger 1	Cumstain / Bare Wires	CASS
148	Tyranis	S/T	CASS
149	Wax Idols	No Future	CASS
150	The Quick	Bigger Than Life	7"
151	The Vex	TBD	CASS
152	Nu Sensae	TV, Death and The Devil	CASS
153	Gap Dream	S/T	CASS/LP
154	Witch	S/T	CASS
155	Witch	Paralyzed	CASS
156	Ruthie	Ruthie's Requests	CASS
157	Tiger High	Myth Is This	CASS
158	Trashed Romeos	Where Dreamers Never Go	CASS
159	Diarrhea Planet	Loose Jewels	CASS
160	The Abigails	Songs of Love and Despair	CASS/LP
161	Lust-Cats of the Gutters	S/T	CASS
162	Culture Kids	S/T	CASS
163	Baby J	Thee Ultimate	CASS
164	Younger Lovers	Rock Flawless	CASS
165	JEFF the Brotherhood	We Are The Champions	CASS
166	Bare Wires	Cheap Perfume	CASS
167	Ugly Things Records	Best Of	CASS
168	Poor Sons	Dunes	CASS
169	Missing Monuments	Painted White	CASS
170	Thee Oh Sees	Thee Hounds Of Foggy Notion / Dog Poison	CASS
171	V.A.	Carlos & Caroline's Wedding	CASS
172	Devon Williams	Carefree/Euphoria 2FER	CASS
173	Bad Antics	Where Did I Go Wrong?	CASS
174	Beaunoise	You Never Close Your Lips When I Kiss Your Eyes	CASS
175	Black Tambourine	S/T	CASS
176	Part Time	Saturday Night	CASS
177	Sea Lions	Everything You Always Wanted to Know About Sea Lions But Were Afraid to Ask	CASS
178	The Zoltars	Should I Try Once More?	CASS
179	JEFF the Brotherhood	Heavy Days	CASS
180	Natural Child	For The Love Of The Game	LP
181	Jacuzzi Boys	Glazin'	CASS
182	Burnt Ones	Meet The Golden Ones	7"
183	Extra Classic	Your Light Like White LIghtning, Your Light Like A Laser Beam + Dub Versions	CASS
184	Bell Gardens	Hangups Need Company	CASS
185	The Cleaners from Venus	Living with Victoria Grey	CASS
186	The Cleaners from Venus	Number Thirteen	CASS
187	Summer Hits	Beaches and Canyons 92–96	CASS
188	The Tyde	Once	CASS
189	The Shivas	WHITEOUT!	CASS
190	Mikal Cronin	S/T	CASS
191	Explorers Club	Grand Hotel	CASS
192	King Kahn and The Shrines	What Is	CASS
193	God Equals Genocide	Rattled Minds	CASS
194	Dry Feet	10 Songs By The Band...	CASS
195	Ty Segall	Singles Collection	CASS
196	Ty Segall	Melted / Goodbye Bread	CASS
197	Ty Segall	Horn The Unicorn / Live in Aisle 5	CASS
198	Ty Segall / Black Time	Split	CASS
199	Wyatt Blair	Candy Eyes	CASS

=== 200–299 ===
- 200 Davila 666 – Singles LP
- 201 Shattered Faith – Demos CASS
- 202 Sam Flax – Age Waves CASS
- 203 Useless Eaters – Daily Commute/C'est Bon! CASS
- 204 La Sera – S/T + Demos CASS
- 205 La Sera – Sees The Light CASS
- 206 Black Jaspers – S/T CASS
- 207 The Sufis – S/T CASS
- 208 Hunx – Hairdresser Blues CASS
- 209 V/A – BRGR PUNK NITE CASS
- 210 Tiger High – Catacombs After Party CASS
- 211 The Late Show – Portable Pop CASS
- 212 Hot Freak Nation – Lifetime to Lifetime CASS
- 213 Cosmonauts – If You Wanna Die Then I Wanna Die LP/CS
- 214 Eating Out – S/T CASS
- 215 Rayon Beach – This Looks Serious CASS
- 216 Lenguas Largas – S/T CASS
- 217 V.A. – Kevin & Babe's Wedding Mixtape CASS
- 218 Thee Oh Sees – Castlemania/Carrion Crawler CASS
- 219 Soviet – Life Begins At Rewirement OST CASS
- 220 V/A – Sound City Studios Comp CASS
- 221 The Breakaways – Walking Out On Love CASS
- 222 Astronaut Kidds – Let's Keep It Real CASS
- 223 Tronics – Love Backed By Force CASS
- 224 Lilac – Christine + 45s & EP CASS
- 225 Nirvana UK – Cults 2xLP
- 226 Joel Gion – EP CASS
- 227 Fletcher C. Johnson – S/T CS/LP
- 228 Zig Zags – S/T
- 229 Exurbs – S/T CASS
- 230 Beaunoise – Ambient II CASS
- 231 Grass Widow – Internal Logic CASS
- 232 The Shit – Is This Shit? CASS
- 233 Off! – S/T CASS
- 234 The Shit – Hits The Fan CASS
- 235 The Memories – S/T CASS
- 236 Dirt Dress – Donde La Vida No Vale Nada CASS
- 237 Gravys Drop – Buddhist Guru 7"
- 238 Brian Jonestown Massacre – Pol-Pot's Pleasure Penthouse CASS
- 239 The Garden – The Life And Times Of A Paperclip LP
- 240 Matt McCluer – Wishful Thinking CASS
- 241 The Pharmacy – Stoned and Alone CASS
- 242 Grape Street – A Date With You CASS
- 243 The Gris Gris – S/T CASS
- 244 The Gris Gris – For The Season CASS
- 245 The Gris Gris – Live At The Creamery CASS
- 246 Chuck Prophet – Temple Beautiful CASS
- 247 The Go – S/T CASS
- 248 Ultra Violet Radio – S/T CASSINGLE
- 249 The Blank Tapes – Sun's Too Bright CASS
- 250 Ric Menck – The Ballad of LP/CASS
- 251 TMAHWK – Demos CASS
- 252 V.A. – Party In The Tower – Fresno Rock N Roll 1980–88 CASS
- 253 Andy Human – Freeze CASS
- 254 Mean Jeans – On Mars CASS
- 255 The Garden – Soundtrack CASS
- 256 HOTT MT – Never Hate Again CASS
- 257 Guantanamo Baywatch – Chest Crawl CASS
- 258 White Fang – High Expectations CASS
- 259 Jaill – Traps CASS
- 260 The Bobbyteens – Back In The Saddle CASS
- 261 The Guitars – Higher Action CASS
- 26*2 The Pharcyde – Bizarre Ride II CASS
- 263 Tenement – Napalm Dream *2xCASS
- 264 Outrageous Cherry – Best Of CASS
- 265 Milk N Cookies – Live at The Whiskey CASS
- 266 Enjoy – Gold CASS
- 267 The Eeries – Home Alone CASS
- 268 Davila 666 – Tan Bajo CASS
- 269 King Tuff – S/T CASS
- 270 The Shit – Slef Portrait CASS
- 271 People's Temple – Sons Of Stone CASS
- 272 Terry Malts – Killing Time CASS
- 273 Kid Little – Let Yourself Go CASS
- 274 Early Dolphin – Return To Whale Island CASS
- 275 The Memories – Live At Burger CASS
- 276 Redd Kross – Researching The Blues CASS
- 277 Bananamou – S/T CASS
- 278 The Go – Whatcha Doin'? CASS
- 279 Human Waste – TBA CASS
- 280 The Tough Shits – Prick Up 07–08 CASS
- 281 Beachwood Sparks – Tarnished Gold CASS
- 282 The Wrong Words – S/T CASS
- 283 The Shrine – Primitive Blast CASS
- 284 Coathangers – Scramble CASS
- 285 Coathangers – Larceny & Old Lace CASS
- 286 BRANES – Perfection Condition LP
- 287 Sir Psych – The Popsike World of Sir Psych CASS
- 288 Mild Manners/ESPS – Excuse Me CASS
- 289 Hammered Satin – S/T CASS
- 290 The Resonars – Crummy Desert Sound LP
- 291 The Pharcyde – Bizarre Ride B-Cydes and Remixes CASS
- 292 Wartella's Strip Show – Hardcover Book
- 293 Peach Kelli Pop – S/T LP/CS
- 294 Natural Child – Hard in Heaven LP/CASS
- 295 The Tomb Weavers – Andrew 7"
- 296 Teenage Burritos – S/T CASS
- 297 DTCV – However Strange CASS
- 298 Spanish Moss – Kelp CASS
- 299 Schlitzie – S/T CASS

=== 300–399 ===
- 300 V.A. – The Kitty Comp CASS
- 301 The Memories – Love Is The Law LP/CASS
- 302 The UFO Club – S/T CASS
- 303 Christian Bland – Lost Album CASS
- 304 Christian Bland – Pig Boat Blues CASS
- 305 Thee Oh Sees – Singles Vol. 1 + 2 CASS
- 306 Screaming Females – Box Set *3xCS
- 307 Denney and the Jets – Slick Rick CASS
- 308 Uzi Rash – When The Veil Is Lifted/FTP Lite 2FER CASS
- 309 The Undertakers – S/T CASS
- 310 V.A. – DJ Don Cesar Vol. 1 CASS
- 311 Joel Jerome – Babies On Acid CASS
- 312 Seth Pettersen – Natural Machine CASS
- 313 Unnatural Helpers – Land Grab CASS
- 314 Cy Dune – No Recognize CASS
- 315 Stan McMahon – La Di Da CASS
- 316 The Half Rats – S/T CASS
- 317 Merlin's Magic Music Box – S/T CASS
- 318 Uzi Rash – Coreless Roll Ran-Liner CASS
- 319 S'Cool Girls – S/T CASS
- 3*20 Pop Zeus – S/T CASS
- 321 The Orions – Always Clean And Fresh CASS
- 3*22 Pookie and the Pookdlez – S/T CASS
- 323 The Horribly Wrong – S/T CASS
- 324 Takashi Miyaki – TBA CASS
- 325 Trin Tran – Dark Radar CASS
- 326 Lace Curtains – S/T CASS/LP
- 327 Freezing Hands – S/T CASS
- 328 Lilac – No Exit CASS
- 329 Massenger – S/T CASS
- 330 The Aquadolls – We Are Free EP CASS
- 331 Swiftums – Don't Trip CASS
- 332 White Fang – Positive Feedback CASS
- 333 Holy Wave – Knife Hits CASS
- 334 Nu Sensae – Sundowning CASS
- 335 Sitar Outreach Ministry – Crucible of Mutants CASS
- 336 FIDLAR – The Record CASS
- 337 Lightships – Electric Cables CASS
- 338 Velvet Crush – Best Of CASS
- 339 Painted Hills – S/T CASS
- 340 Choo Choo Train – The Complete Recordings CASS
- 341 Uzi Rash – Beast Of Trash CASS
- 342 Cheap Time – Best Of CASS
- 343 Nova Verta – S/T CASS
- 344 Bare Wires – Idle Dreams CASS
- 345 Paperhead – S/T CASS
- 346 Ty Segall – Slaughterhouse CASS
- 347 Thee Oh Sees – Warm Slime CASS
- 348 Campo-Formio – S/T CASS
- 349 Fatal Jamz – Daddy's Little Dufus CASS
- 350 The Hound Of Love – Careful Houndy CASS
- 351 The Growlers – Beach Goth CASS
- 351 The Middle Class – Out Of Vogue CASS
- 352 The Adolescents – Blue Album CASS
- 353 Rikk Agnew – All By Myself CASS
- 354 China White – S/T CASS
- 355 Sleeping Bags – S/T CASS
- 356 Bell Gardens – Full-length CASS
- 357 Yacht Club – Tropicana 7"
- 358 Hunx – I Vant To Suck Your Cock CASSINGLE
- 359 Saba Lou – Until The End CASSINGLE
- 360 Coachwhips – Bangers vs Fuckers CASS
- 361 MMOSS – 2nd CASS
- 362 Biff Bang Pow! – Best Of CASS
- 363 Jasmine Minks – Best Of CASS
- 364 Slaughter Joe – Best Of CASS
- 365 Grand Elegance – Cold Winter Dreams CASS
- 366 Federale – The Blood Flowed Like Wine CASS
- 367 Paperhead – Looking Glass CASS
- 368 Wax Witches – Celebrity Beatings CASS
- 369 Cornershop – The Hot For May Sound CASS
- 370 Audacity – Power Drowning/Mellow Cruisers 2FER CASS
- 371 You Me & Us – Paperweights CASS
- 372 Indian Jewelry – Peel It CASS
- 37*3 V.A. – Thai Funk Vol. 1 CASS
- 374 V.A. – Thai Funk Vol. 2 CASS
- 375 Blowfly – Black in the Sack CASS
- 376 Thurston + Beck – Mind Warp CASS
- 377 Gentleman Jesse – Leaving Atlanta CASS
- 378 Business Cats – S/T CASS
- 379 V.A. – Wiener Dog Comp CASS
- 380 Sailors of Neptune – S/T CASS
- 381 La Luz – Damp Face CASS
- 382 Cumstain – White People Problems CASS/LP
- 383 Vision – S/T CASS
- 384 The Three O'Clock – Bootleg LP
- 385 Unkle Funkle – Picture Of My Dick CASS
- 386 The Cleaners from Venus – The Late District CASS
- 387 Enjoy – Spaceships and Attitudes CASS
- 388 Groundislava – Feel Me CASS
- 389 The Memories – Rainy Day Tape
- 390 Lancelot Exotica – Attack Mix CASS
- 391 The Brotherhood of the Lizards – Lizardland CASS
- 392 Masters Of Reality – S/T CASS
- 393 Lamebrain / Mope Grooves – Split CASS
- 394 V.A. – Daddy Rockin' Strong: A Tribute to Nolan Strong & The Diablos CASS
- 395 Cherry Glazerr – Trick Or Treat Dancefloor CASS
- 396 Burger's *20*1*3 Calendar CAL
- 397 Bed Rugs – Rapids CASS
- 398 Big Boys – Where's My Towel/Industry Standard CASS
- 399 Cumstain – Fawn Spots – Wedding Dress CASS

=== 400–present ===
- 400 The Go – Fiesta LP/CASS
- 401 Dreamdate – 3FER CASS
- 402 The Growlers – Hung At Heart CASS
- 403 Burnt Ones – You'll Never Walk Alone LP
- 404 Paul Messis – The Problem With Me CASS
- 405 The Lovely Bad Things – The Late Great Whatever CASS
- 406 The Go – Supercuts CASS
- 407 The Natives/The Garden – Split CASS
- 408 The Adolescents – Demos CASS
- 409 Three O'Clock – *16 Tambourines + Baroque Hoedown CASS
- 410 Redd Kross – Born Innocent CASS
- 411 V.A. – Dangerhouse Vol. 1 CASS
- 412 V.A. – Dangerhouse Vol. 2 CASS
- 413 Christian Death – Only Theater Of Pain CASS
- 414 The Weirdos – Weird World 1+2 CASS
- 415 The Middle Class – Homeland CASS
- 416 The Flyboys – S/T CASS
- 417 Salvation Army – Befour Three O'Clock CASS
- 418 Suicidal Tendencies – S/T CASS
- 419 The Pinkz – Collection CASS
- 4*20 Free Weed – Fantasy CASS
- 4*21 Haunted Tiger – King Kong Songs CASS/LP
- 4*22 The Resonars – Tripping In Your Coffin CASS
- 423 Mean Jeans – Demos CASS
- 424 V.A. – I'm Just The Other Woman – MSR Madness, Vol. *4 CASS
- 425 Stupid Cupids – S/T *12"
- 426 Warm Soda – Someone For You CASS
- 427 Curt Boettcher – Misty Mirage CASS
- 428 The Creation – Power Surge CASS
- 429 Shannon and the Clams – Singles Collection CASS
- 430 The Orwells – Remember When CASS
- 431 The Shit – General Ulysses CASS
- 432 SISU – Light Eyes CASS
- 433 V.A. – Mike Atta Benefit Comp CASS
- 434 Dead Ghosts – Can't Get No LP
- 435 BOOM! – Get A Grip CASS
- 436 The Garden – Everything Is Perfect CASS
- 437 Thee Rain Cats – TBD CASS
- 438 Psychic Hotline – TBA
- 439 Juniper Rising – TBA CASS
- 440 White Night – TBA LP
- 441 Cosmonauts – Singles Collection CASS
- 442 V.A. – Ambiguous Sampler Vol. 1 CD
- 443 White Mystery – Telepathic CASS
- 444 Gravys Drop – Gumball LP
- 445 The Elephant Stone – S/T CASS
- 446 Bobb Trimble – TBA CASS
- 447 The Prefab Messiahs – TBA CASS
- 448 V.A. – DJ Don Cesar Vol. 2 CASS
- 449 BBQ – Tie Your Noose CASS
- 450 Brotherhood of Lizards – S/T
- 451 Sir Lord Von Raven – 2nd Album CASS
- 452 The Be Helds – Vol 1 CASS
- 453 Melted Toys – S/T CASS
- 454 Tomorrows Tulips – Experimental Jelly LP
- 455 Free Weed – Bong Pop
- 456 Summer Twins – Forget Me 7"
- 457 Free Weed & Unkle Funkle – Valentine's Day CASS
- 458 The Bam Bams – S/T CASS
- 459 V.A. – The Taste of Burger Records 2xCASS
- 460 Glitz – It'z Glitz CASS
- 461 Traumahelikopter – S/T
- 462 The Rang Dangs – TBA CASS
- 463 Bleached – TBA CASS
- 464 Beach Day – TBA
- 465 Elvis Christ – And So It Shall Be CASS
- 466 DJ Kid Slizzard – For The Weed Smokers CASS
- 467 Street Gnar – Study Wall CASS
- 468 Colleen Green – Sock It To Me CASS
- 469 Red Rippers – Over There… and Over Here CASS
- 470 The Three O'Clock – Aquarius Andromeda LP
- 471 Sneakpeek – S/T CASS
- 472 Fingers of the Sun – TBA CASS
- 473 Games – TBA CASS
- 474 Night Drives – TBA CASS
- 475 The Felines – TBA CASS
- 476 Make Up – Save Yourself CASS
- 477 Puzzle – That's Fine CASS
- 478 Conspiracy of Owls – Flexi
- 478 The Garden – S/T/Everything's Perfect 2FER CASS
- 479 Cosmonauts – S/T/If You Wanna Die 2FER CASS
- 480 Lumina – TBA CASS
- 481 Black Bananas – Rad Times XPress IV CASS
- 482 Jib Kidder – TBA CASS
- 483 The Sufis – Inventions LP
- 484 Wyatt Blair – Banana Cream Dream CASS
- 485 Sonny Skyes – The Imaginary Friend Ship CASS
- 486 Neil Hamburger – Indecent in Cambridge Mass CASS
- 487 Sudden Death Of Stars – Getting Up, Going Down CASS
- 488 The Smoking Trees – Acetate CASS
- 489 '82 Crowd of People – S/T CASS
- 490 Mozes and the Firstborn – TBA CASS/LP
- 491 Davie Liebe Hart – Exercise VHS
- 492 Habibi – TBA LP/CASS
- 493 Free Moral Agents – Live CASS
- 49*4 Cool Ghouls – S/T CASS
- 495 David Liebe Hart Band – TBA CASS
- 496 Night Sun – No Pressure 7"
- 497 Cosmonauts – Persona Non Grata CASS/LP
- 498 The Abigails – Tundra LP/CASS
- 499 Idiot Glee – TBA CASS
- 500 Preston Whitehurst – Spirit Wagon CASS
- 501 Gap Dream – Chill Spot/Peter's Brother 7"
- 502 Miss Chain and the Broken Heels – The Dawn CASS
- 503 Fletcher C. Johnson – It Rained Something Wicked CASS
- 504 Dressy Bessy – TBA CASS
- 505 The Kids – S/T CASS
- 506 The Shine Brothers – Hello Grief Birds CASS
- 507 Jovontaes – Paranoia Makes A Crazy Gift CASS
- 508 Shannon and the Clams – Dreams from the Rat House CASS
- 509 Jonathan Toubin – NY Soul Dance Night Train CASS
- 510 Boys Age – Fake Gold CASS
- 511 The Rich Hands – Dreamers CASS
- 512 White Fang – Steady Truckin' For Summer CASS
- 513 Curtis Harding – Keep On Shining 7"
- 514 Rexx – My New Punk Rock Life CASS
- 515 Vaadat Charigim – The World Is Well Lost CASS
- 516 Audacity – Juva Jive EP
- 517 Bad Indians – Are On The Other Side CASS
- 518 V.A. – IRMA Japan Comp CD
- 519 Bart Davenport – Physical World CASS
- 520 Cherry Glazerr – Haxel Princess LP/CD/CASS
- 521 Big Eyes – Almost Famous CASS
- 522 Hunx – Street Punk CASS
- 523 Lenz – Ways To End A Day CASS
- 524 Jaill – Cranes CASS
- 526 Strawberry Alarm Clock – Wake Up Where Are You CASS
- 527 Frausdots – Despair Gazette Demos CASS
- 528 V.A. – East LA Comp CASS
- 529 Exploding Flowers – S/T CASS
- 530 Thee Goochi Boiz – Fast Food For The Teenage Soul CASS
- 531 Wet Spots – S/T CASS
- 532 Games – TBA CASS
- 533 Gateway Drugs – TBA CASS
- 534 Hott MT – I Made This CASS
- 535 Hot Lunch – S/T CASS
- 536 Wax Idols – Discipline + Desire CASS
- 537 Lonesome Shack – Slidin Boa / City Man 2FER CASS
- 538 Sauna – Cheap Date CASS
- 539 The People's Temple – More For The Masses CASS
- 540 The Orwells – Other Voices CASS
- 541 Together Pangea – Snakedog CASS
- 542 Warm – S/T CASS
- 543 Twink – Think Pink CASS
- 544 Part Time – PDA CASS
- 545 Mom – Mom-Comic BOOK
- 546 Phil Thomas Katt – Nine Lives CASS
- 547 Honey Bucket – S/T CASS
- 548 Love Cop – 2 True / 2 Real CASS
- 549 Totally You – Coconut Heaven CASS
- 550 Natural Child – Dancin' With Wolves LP/CD/CASS
- 551 Jerry Rogers – Point Of Contact CASS
- 552 39 Clocks – Paint It Dark CASS
- 553 Masta Ace – Sittin' On Chrome Deluxe CASS
- 554 Cheryll – S/T CASS
- 555 Gap Dream – Shine Your Light LP/CASS/CD
- 556 Froth – Patterns CASS
- 557 Matt Kivel – Double Exposure CASS
- 558 The Weirdos – Weird World 2 CASS
- 559 Dream Boys – S/T CASS
- 560 The Memories – Touched By An Angel CASS
- 561 The Memories – Breezy Evening CASS
- 562 V.A. – The Wiener Dog Comp 2 – The Ghoulie Tape CASS
- 563 The Orwells – Who Needs You EP CASS
- 564 Free Weed & Unkle Funkle – 2 Sides 2 Summer CASS
- 565 Boogarins – As Plantas Que Curam CASS
- 566 John Wesley Coleman – Lizard Of Pop LP/CD/CASS
- 567 Enjoy – Mist CASS
- 568 Puzzle – About You CASS
- 569 V.A. – Tribute To Velvet Underground's White Light/White Heat CASS/LP
- 570 East Village – Drop Out CASS
- 571 Extra Classic – Showcase CASS
- 572 The Golden Animals – Hear Eye GO CASS
- 573 Preston Whitehurst – Spirit Wagon CASS
- 574 Sitar Outreach Ministry – Rise of the Flowers CASS
- 575 Denney and the Jets – Mexican Coke LP/CD/CASS
- 576 Joel Jerome – Psychedelic Thriftstore Folk CASS
- 577 John Krautner – Fun With Gum Vol 1 LP/CD/CASS
- 578 V.A. – Kiss of the Damned OST CASS
- 579 Cedell Davis – Feels Like I'm Doing Something Wrong CASS
- 580 Famous Renfroe – Children CASS
- 581 Hi Rhythm – On The Loose CASS
- 582 Junior Kimbrough – All Night Long CASS
- 583 Townes Van Zandt – Townes Van Zandt CASS
- 584 The Freeks – Full On CASS
- 585 V.A. – I Need You Bad Comp CASS
- 586 F'ke Blood – The Band That Bled Real Blood CASS
- 587 Today's Hits – TBA CASS
- 588 Jail Weddings – Meltdown – A Declaration Of Unpopular Emotion CASS
- 589 V.A. – Cumstain vs Pookie and the Poodlez – Split CASS
- 590 V.A. – Now That's What I Call Burger Vol 1 DIGI
- 591 Conspiracy of Owls – Puzzle People / Ancient Robots 7"
- 592 Michael Rey and the Woebegones – Retrospective CASS
- 593 Night Beats – Sonic Bloom CASS
- 594 Melody's Echo Chamber – S/T CASS
- 595 Jacco Gardner – Cabinet Of Curiosities CASS
- 596 Blank Tapes – Vacation CASS
- 597 COLDBEAT – TBA CASS
- 598 V.A. – Fidlar / The Orwells – Split CASS
- 599 AJ Davila – TBA LP/CD/CASS
- 600 Curtis Harding – S/T LP/CD/CASS
- 601 V.A. – Hits! of Burger Records – Japanese Exclusive CD
- 602 Frankie Rose – Herein Wild CASS
- 603 Jackson Scott – Melbourne CASS
- 604 Cumstain – White People Problems CASS
- 605 Charlie Boyer and the Voyeurs – Clarietta CASS
- 606 Audacity – Butter Knife CASS
- 607 Vex Ruffin – S/T CASS
- 608 SISU – Blood Tears CASS
- 609 La Luz – It's Alive CASS
- 610 The Skabbs – Idle Threat CASS
- 611 Jacuzzi Boys – S/T CASS
- 612 V.A. – Now That's What I Call Burger Vol 2 DIGI
- 613 The Garden – S/T/Everything's Perfect 2FER CASS
- 614 The Growlers – Beach Goth CASS
- 615 Together Pangea – Jelly Jam/Wisdom Surf CASS
- 616 Gap Dream – Peter's Brother FLEXI
- 617 The Zoltars – Walking Through the Dark CASS
- 618 Mr. Elevator And The Brain Hotel – Nico… and Her Psychedelic Subconscious CASS/LP/CD
- 619 Wax Witches – Centre of Your Universe CASS/LP/CD
- 620 Mikal Cronin – MCII CASS
- 621 Pat Thomas – Coasters Riding In The Air CASS
- 622 V.A. – Cynic Cave Comedy Club CASS
- 623 Crazy Band – TBA CASS
- 624 James Quall – The Album CASS
- 625 Chico Sonido – Nalga Bass CASS
- 626 Las Rosas – Flower In The Sun CASS
- 627 Jonathan Toubin – Halloween Mix CASS
- 628 Burger Calendar 2014 CAL
- 629 The Beginner's Mynd – S-T CASS
- 630 Las Ardillas – S/T CASS
- 631 Los Saicos – Demolicion CASS
- 632 The Explorers Club – Don't Waste Her Time DIGI SINGLE
- 633 DTCV – Hilarious Heaven CASS
- 634 Tiger High – 2FER LP
- 635 The Pharmacy – Spells CASS
- 636 Pizza Time – Quiero Mas CASS
- 637 Unkle Funkle – Supernatural CASS/LP/CD
- 638 Dude York – TBA CASS
- 639 Tomorrows Tulips – Eternally Teenage—Experimental Jelly 2FER CASS
- 640 Today's Hits – Christmas Album CASS
- 641 The Rebel Set – How To Make A Monster CASS
- 642 V.A. – Now That's What I Call Burger Vol 3 DIGI
- 643 R Stevie Moore – Delicate Tension CASS
- 644 Colleen Green – Milo Goes To Compton CASS
- 645 Colleen Green – Cujo CASS
- 646 Frank Alpine – TBA CASS
- 647 Illegal Civilization – Art Show CASS
- 648 The Garden + Ashley Calhoun – Halloween Tape CASS
- 649 Hollyberries – I Wanna Go Surfin With Santa CASS
- 650 Vox Pop – Single 7"
- 651 Chain and the Gang – Music's Not For Everyone CASS
- 652 Circle Jerks – Group Sex CASS
- 653 Temples – Sun Structures CASS
- 654 Twink – Lost Experimental Recordings 1970 CASS
- 655 Heatmiser – Dead Air CASS
- 656 Heatmiser – Cop and Speeder CASS
- 657 Heatmiser – Yellow No. 5 CASS
- 658 White Fang – Chunks LP/CD/CASS
- 659 Eddie and the Subtitles – Fuck You CASS
- 660 Shagrat – Pink Jacket Required CASS
- 661 Thin White Rope – Exploring the Axis CASS
- 662 The Memories – TBA LP/CD/CASS
- 663 Twink – Odds + Beg. CASS
- 664 Young Fresh Fellows – The Men Who Make The Music CASS
- 665 Street Trolleys – TBA CASS
- 666 Kim Fowley – Let's Get Blasted CASS
- 667 Pontiac Brothers – Doll Hut CASS
- 668 BOYTOY – S/T CASS
- 669 Shoes – Best CASS
- 670 Les Marinellis – S/T CASS
- 671 The Abigails – Songs of Love and Despair/Tundra 2FER CASS
- 672 Twink – You Reached For The Stars CASS
- 673 Twink – The Think Pink and Never Neverland Demos CASS
- 674 Death Valley Girls – Street Venom CASS
- 675 The Courtneys – Lost Boys CASS
- 676 Marshmallow Overcoat – TBA CASS
- 677 V.A. Suicide Squeeze Presents Forever Singles CASS
- 678 Holy Wave – Relax CASS
- 679 Together Pangea – Badillac CASS
- 680 V.A. – Now That's What I Call Burger Vol. 4 DIGI
- 681 Beachwood Sparks – Desert Skies CASS
- 682 V.A. – NYE Reverberation 2014 CASS
- 683 Massenger – Girl Glass CASS
- 684 Sudden Death of Stars – All Unrevealed Parts Of The Unknown CASS
- 685 LOOP – The World In Your Eyes CASS
- 686 Burnt Ones – Gift CASS
- 687 The Sands – Hotel and Casino CASS
- 688 V.A. – Beach Goth Party II CASS
- 689 Margo Guryan – 27 Demos CASS
- 690 Kikagaku Moyo – S/T CASS
- 691 Thee Oh Sees – Putrifiers II CASS
- 692 Thee Oh Sees – Floating Coffin CASS
- 693 Damaged Bug – Hubba Bubba CASS
- 694 Traumahelikopter – I Don't Understand Them At All CASS
- 695 The Rich Hands – TBA CASS
- 696 Cool Moms – TBA CASS
- 697 Beaunoise – Ambient III CASS
- 698 Black Lips – Underneath The Rainbow CASS
- 699 Pujol – Kludge CASS
- 700 The Muffs – Whoop Dee Doo LP/CD/CS
- 701 Pure X – Angel CASS
- 702 Pizza Time – You Wanna Pizza Me CASS
- 703 Coathangers – Suck My Shirt CASS
- 704 Black Sea – Keep Smiling/Optimistic Sigh EP CASS
- 705 Cementu Umongongo – Extraordianre CASS
- 706 Strange Hands – Children Shouldn't Play With Dead Things CASS
- 707 OFF! – Wasted Years CASS
- 708 Tomorrows Tulips – When LP/CD/CASS
- 709 Queenie – Luv Me Or Feed Me CASS
- 710 VA – Deep Secrets Vol 2 CASS
- 711 Dog Party – TBA CASS
- 712 The Shivas – TBA CASS
- 713 V.A. – Now That's What I Call Burger Vol. 5 DIGI
- 714 Cretin Stompers – TBA CASS
- 715 Cutty Flam – Robot Heart CASS
- 716 Mystic Braves – Desert Island CASS
- 717 Sandy Pussy – TBA CASS
- 718 Rodriguez – Cold Fact CASS
- 719 Rodriguez – Coming From Reality CASS
- 720 The Black Angels – Passover CASS
- 721 The Black Angels – Directions To See A Ghost CASS
- 722 PiL – First Issue CASS
- 723 Honey Ltd – The Complete LHI Years CASS
- 724 Roky Erickson – Evil One CASS
- 725 Karen Dalton – In My Own Time CASS
- 726 Betty Davis – Betty Davis CASS
- 727 Jim Sullivan – UFO CASS
- 728 The Free Design – Kites Are Fun CASS
- 729 Big Boys – Lullabies Help The Brain Grow CASS
- 730 Big Boys – No Matter How Long The Line At The Cafeteria, There's Always A Seat CASS
- 731 Built To Spill – Ultimate Alternative Wavers CASS
- 732 AJ Davila – Terror Amor CASS
- 733 Ruthie – Joule EP CASS
- 734 Vision – Inertia LP/CD/CASS
- 736 Fade Up Fade Out Bye Bye – S/T CASS
- 737 Sloth Rust – TBA CASS
- 738 Outrageous Cherry – Digital Age LP/CD/CASS
- 739 Hound – Out Of Space CASS
- 740 Hound – Out Of Time CASS
- 741 Dwarves – Invented CASS/CD
- 742 Dwarves – Fun To Try 7"
- 743 John Doe – The Westerner CASS
- 744 Billy Changer / Tracy Bryant – 2 in 1 CASS
- 745 Rexx – Death and Other Ways To Be Artsy CASS
- 746 Elephant Stone – The Three Poisons CASS
- 747 The Cairo Gang – Live at Burger Vol. 3
- 748 Hector's Pets – Pet-o-Feelia CASS
- 749 The Garden – haha LP/CD/CASS
- 750 Grape St – Wallpaper LP/CD/CASS
- 751 The Universal Friend – Ghosts in the World CASS
- 752 V.A. – A Tribute to Lou Reed CASS
- 753 Melted Toys – S/T CASS
- 754 Guided By Voices – Cool Planet CASS
- 755 Cleaners From Venus – Return To Bohemia CASS
- 756 Wax Witches – From Hell CASS
- 757 Necros – Live in 85 CASS
- 758 The Rubinoos – Basement Tapes (Studio Demos 1980–81) CASS
- 759 Lees of Memory – Sisyphus Says CASS
- 760 White Fang – Chill Yourself – Fan Favorites 2009–2013 CASS
- 761 Michael Rault – Nothing Means Nothing CASS
- 762 Eli Pop – It's All Around CASS
- 763 The Sound Reasons – Til The End Of Time CASS
- 764 The Jackals – People CASS
- 765 Margo Guryan – Chopsticks CASS
- 766 Lenguas Largas – Come On In CASS
- 767 Joel Gion – Apple Bonkers CASS
- 768 LA Takedown – Top Down CASS
- 769 Jenny Lewis – The Voyager CASS
- 770 Yacht Club – Burnt Cream EP CASS
- 771 V.A. – Black Rain Entertainment Presents Welcome To The Darkside CASS
- 772 Prefab Messiahs – Keep Your Stupid Dreams Alive CASS/10"
- 773 The Yolks – Kings of Awesome CASS
- 774 Rodd Keith – TBA CASS
- 775 Gap Dream / Part Time – Split 7"
- 776 V.A. – Ambiguous Record Bag CASS
- 777 Pleiades – S/T LP/CASS
- 778 Sonnyskyes – I Kinda Like Living In The Sky CASS
- 779 Tha Club House Click – Ovaworked Undapaid CASS
- 780 Christian Bland & The Revelators – The Unseen Green Obscene CASS
- 781 Part Time – Late Night CASS
- 782 Spindrift – Exotic Detonation CASS
- 783 V.A. – Midtown Island Recordings CASS
- 784 Harsh Mistress – Harsh Mistress CASS
- 785 Jonah Ray – Hello, Mr Magic Plane Person, Hello CASS
- 786 V.A. – Burger Flashback – Self-Titled Mag CASS
- 787 David Vandervelde – Shadow Slides CASS
- 788 The Lemons – Hello LP/CD/CASS
- 789 Michael Rault – Living Daylight LP/CD/CASS
- 790 Weezer – Everything Will Be Alright In The End CASS
- 791 V.A. – Deep Secret Vol. 3 CASS
- 792 The Golden Dawn – Power Plant CASS
- 793 Corners – Maxed Out On Distractions CASS
- 794 White Mystery – Dubble Dragon CASS
- 795 La Femme – Psycho Tropical Berlin CASS
- 796 Methadone Kitty – Unconfined CASS
- 797 The Dogs – Fed Up CASS
- 798 Once and Future Band – Brain EP CASS
- 799 Mens Club – S/T CASS
- 800 Sarah Bethe Nelson – Fast Moving Clouds LP/CD/CASS
- 801 No Parents – May The Thirst Be With You CASS/LP/CD
- 802 Pink Mexico – Fool CASS
- 803 Gary With A Circle Around The A – Wish You Were Hair 7"
- 804 Gal Pals – Velvet Rut CASS
- 805 Big White – Teenage Dreams CASS/LP/CD
- 806 Daxls – Seven Inches And More CASS
- 807 Hinds / Parrots – Split 7"
- 808 The Parrots – Weed For The Parrots CASS
- 809 Promise – Promise CASS
- 810 Step-Panther – Strange But Nice CASS
- 811 Stan McMahon Band – Live in Salem CASS
- 812 Dengue Fever – Best Of CASS
- 813 La Sera – Hour of the Dawn CASS
- 814 Kim and the Created / Prettiest Eyes – Split CASS
- 815 Susan – The Eleanore Sessions CASS
- 816 Mope Grooves – Weird Girls CASS
- 817 The Tomb Weavers – Mystic Seer 7"
- 818 Further – Where Were You Then? 1991–97 CASS
- 819 The Tubs – Rag CASS
- 820 Those Pretty Wrongs – Lucky Guy 7"/CASS
- 821 Hello Kitty On Ice – Man With A Hole In His Throat 7"
- 822 Hot Knives – Hot Knives CASS
- 823 Labryyynth – Labryyynth CASS
- 824 Cool Ghouls – A Swirling Fire Burning Through the Rye CASS
- 825 Vaadat Charigim – Sinking As A Stone LP/CD/CASS
- 826 V.A. – BURGER 日本上陸 JAPAN CASS
- 827 Cosmonauts – Oh, You Know CASS
- 828 Pearl Charles – S/T CASS
- 829 Tijuana Panthers – Max Baker CASS
- 830 Cotillon – Cotillon CASS
- 831 Seth Pettersen – Sweet Reaper CASS
- 832 Telephone Lovers – TBA CASS
- 833 Mitchell Adam Johnson – Half Moon Lane CASS
- 834 US Bombs – Put Strength In The Final Blow CASS
- 835 The Stitches – 8 x 12 CASS
- 836 The Haiduks – 1968 CASS
- 837 Mr Twin Sister – S/T CASS
- 838 Geza X – You Goddam Kids! CASS
- 839 Rexx – I Really Tried To Save The Day CASS
- 840 V.A. – Burger Nuggets (Japan Only) CD
- 841 The Zoltars – The Zoltars CASS
- 842 Lucern Raze – Stockholm One CASS
- 843 Melted – Ziptripper CASS
- 844 Labryyynth – Labryyynth 7" LATHE CUT
- 845 Los Panky's – Collection LP/CASS
- 846 Dwarves – Lick It CD/CASS
- 847 Dwarves – Free Cocaine CD/CASS
- 848 Dwarves – Are Younger And Even Better Looking 2xLP/CD/CASS
- 849 Brian Jonestown Massacre – Aufheben CASS
- 850 Jaill – Brain Cream LP/CD/CASS
- 851 Night Beats – Who Sold My Generation CASS
- 852 DFL – Proud To Be CASS
- 853 Rikk Agnew Band – Learn CASS
- 854 Wyatt Blair – Point Of No Return LP/CD/CASS
- 855 Santoros – El Perdedor CASS
- 856 Distractor – Devotion CASS
- 857 Groundislava – Frozen Throne CASS
- 858 V.A. – BURGER 日本上陸 JAPAN 2 CASS
- 859 Les Marinellis – Île De Rêve CASS
- 860 Las Robertas – Days Unmade CASS
- 861 Fatal Jamz – Coverboy CASS
- 862 Colleen Green – I Want To Grow Up CASS
- 863 Margaret Doll Rod – Heartthrob Chassis CASS
- 864 Dancer – Singles CASS
- 865 La Lenguas – Tears In My Milkshake CASS
- 866 The Relationship – Oh Allen 7"/CASS
- 867 Jacco Gardner – Hypnophobia CASS
- 868 Laure Briard – Revelation CASS
- 869 Penetration Moon – Penetration Moon CD/CASS
- 870 Hinds – Burger CASS
- 871 Guantanamo Baywatch – Darling... It's Too Late CASS
- 872 Jon Spencer Blues Explosion – Freedom Tower – No Wave Dance Party 2015 CASS
- 873 Warm Soda – Symbolic Dream CASS
- 874 V.A. – Burger World Netherlands CASS
- 875 Part Time – Virgo's Maze 2xLP/CD/CASS
- 876 Mozes and the Firstborn – Great Pile Of Nothing LP/CD/CASS
- 877 Elephant Stone – ES3PRMX CASS
- 878 Swimmers – Silver Bullet CASS
- 879 The High Curbs – Marcelo Cleveland CASS
- 880 Tyranis – Out On Bail CASS
- 881 Moon Duo – Shadow Of The Sun CASS
- 882 The Smoking Trees – TST CASS
- 883 Dirty Ghosts – Cataract EP CASS
- 884 Vicky and the Vengents – You Used To Be My Baby CASS
- 885 Levitation Room – Ethos LP/CD/CASS
- 886 Puzzle – Silver Jungle CASS
- 887 Soviet – Ghosts CASS
- 888 Jessie Jones – Jessie Jones LP/CD/CASS
- 889 Together Pangea – The Phage EP 12"/CASS/CD
- 890 Brian Jonestown Massacre – Revelation CASS
- 891 Boys Age – Calm Time CASS
- 892 The Cairo Gang – Goes Missing CASS
- 893 Plastic Pinks – Sunnyside Rabbits CASS
- 894 Love Cop – Eat Yr Heart Out / Pop Magick Is Real 2FER CASS
- 895 V.A. – Best of the Burger Demo Box CASS
- 896 Tobin Sprout – Carnival Boy LP/CD/CASS
- 897 Tobin Sprout – Moonflower Plastic (Welcome To My Wigwam) LP/CD/CASS
- 898 Green Day – Dookie CASS
- 899 Tracy Bryant – Subterranean LP/CD/CASS
- 900 Gap Dream – This Is Gap Dream LP/CD/CASS
- 901 FREE WEED – Introducing... CASS
- 902 Walter – Get Well Soon CASS
- 903 Dead Ghosts – Love And Death And All The Rest LP/CD/CASS
- 904 V.A. – Beach Blvd CASS
- 905 Summer Twins – Limbo LP/CD/CASS
- 906 Fade Up Fade Out Bye Bye – Vol. 2 Pardom Mon Moi Hello Again Merci... LP/CD
- 907 Dissolve To Island – Moonrakers in the City Of Gold CASS
- 908 Shrouded Strangers – Teleport Beach CASS
- 909 Cosmonauts – Doom Generation LATHE CUT
- 910 Tomorrows Tulips – iNdy rock royalty comb 12"/CASS
- 911 Froth – Bleak LP/CD/CASS
- 912 Soko – My Dreams Dictate My Reality CASS
- 913 Las Rosas – Everyone Gets Exactly What They Want CASS
- 914 Nervous Gender – Music From Hell CASS
- 915 Unkle Funkle – Rub Rub Release / Picture of My Dick 2FER CASS
- 916 La Luz – Weirdo Shrine CASS
- 917 Sandy Nelson – Meet The Veebles CASS
- 918 Jigsaw Seen – Have A Wonderful Day CASS
- 919 Fidlar – Too CASS
- 920 Dead Meadow – S/T CASS
- 921 The Shivas – Better Off Dead CASS
- 922 Gymshorts – Wet Willy CASS
- 923 Massenger – Banshee EP CASS
- 924 Meercaz and the Visions – Meercaz and the Visions CASS
- 925 Peach Kelli Pop – iii LP/CD/CASS
- 926 Doug Tuttle – Doug Tuttle CASS
- 927 V.A. – Burger Boogaloo 2015 CASS
- 928 V.A. – Fuzzville #1 CASS
- 929 Electric Magpie – Begins CASS
- 930 Massenger – Peeling Out LP/CD/CASS
- 931 Samira's Infinite Summer – On My Mind 7"
- 932 Natural Child – Bodyswitchers LP
- 933 Death Valley Girls – Glow In The Dark LP/CD/CS
- 934 Diamond Hands – Diamond Hands CASS
- 935 Emotional – Ahh, The Name's Emotional, Baby! CASS/LP
- 936 The Sarcastic Assholes – Schrammit! CASS
- 937 Squirt Flower – Peace Questions Evil CASS
- 938 Faux Ferocious – Blues Legends CASS
- 939 Tommy Stinson – LMAO CASS
- 940 Boogarins – Manual CASS
- 941 The Gooch Palms – Novo's CASS
- 942 Pizza Time – Todo LP/CD/CASS
- 943 V.A. – Burger-A-Go-Go 2 Compilation CASS
- 944 Pete Dello And Friends – Into Your Ears CASS
- 945 Dinosaur Jr – Give A Glimpse Of What Yer Not CASS
- 946 The Stitches – Do The Jetset (Signed) LP
- 947 Jakob Danger – Jakob Danger CASS
- 948 Testors – Testors CASS
- 949 Berlin Brats – Berlin Brats CASS
- 950 Seth Bogart – Seth Bogart LP/CD/CS
- 951 Crofton / Pujol – Hapless Fools' Phantom Haircuts CASS
- 952 Tashaki Miyaki – The Dream CASS
- 953 Margo Guryan – Take A Picture CASS
- 954 Birdcloud – Tetnis CASS
- 955 Wax Witches – Memory Painting LP/CD/CASS
- 956 V.A. – KiliKiliVilla CASS
- 957 Gap Dream – S/T + Shine Your Light 2FER CASS
- 958 Shannon and the Clams – Gone By The Dawn CASS
- 959 Panaderia – Buena Onda CASS
- 960 Cassie Ramone – Christmas In Reno LP/CD/CASS
- 961 Dressy Bessy – Kingsized CASS
- 962 Thomas Mudrick – (((boing))) CASS
- 963 Winter – All The Things You Do DIGI
- 964 Melted – Live on KXLU CASS
- 965 The Bananas – Box Set 3xCASS
- 966 Kenny Rogers and First Edition – Live 1972 CASS
- 967 The Glass Family – Electric Band CASS
- 968 V.A. – Burger Headphones CASS
- 969 Flamin' Groovies – Crazy Macy 7"/CASS
- 970 The Quick – Live CASS
- 971 Virgin Kids – Greasewheel CASS
- 972 Patsy's Rats – Patsy's Rats CASS
- 973 Jason Simon – Familiar Haunts CASS
- 974 Swiftumz – Everybody Loves Chris CASS
- 975 Curtis Harding / Black Lips – I Don't Wanna Go Home 7"
- 976 Those Pretty Wrongs – Those Pretty Wrongs LP/CASS
- 977 No Parents – Hey Grandma and the Greatest Hits CASS
- 978 Grinning Ghosts – Yesterday Tomorrow CASS
- 979 Thee Oh Sees – Volume 3 CASS
- 980 Coromandelles – Late Bloomers' Bloomers CASS
- 981 TSOL – Beneath The Shadows CASS
- 982 Re-Animadores – Me Das Asco CASS
- 983 Boytoy – Grackle CASS
- 984 Jacuzzi Boys – Happy Damage CASS
- 985 Veruca Salt – Ghost Notes CASS
- 986 SWMRS – Drive North CASS
- 987 Fletcher C. Johnson – Lesson In Tenderness LP/CD/CASS
- 988 Pop Zeus – TBA 2xLP/CD/CASS
- 989 Flipper – Cassette Generic Flipper CASS
- 990 Adrian Street and the Pile Drivers – Shake, Wrestle and Roll LP/CD/CASS
- 991 La Sera – Music For Listening To Music To CASS
- 992 Ice Cold Slush – Messy Endings CASS
- 993 Hinds – Leave Me Alone CASS
- 994 White Night – Weird Night LP/CASS/CD
- 995 The Black Lips – Box Set 4xCASS
- 996 The Side Eyes – The Side Eyes CASS
- 997 Feels – Feels CASS
- 998 The MnMs – Melts In Your Ears LP/CASS/CD
- 999 The Wizards – Purple Magic LP/CS
- 1000 The Burger Buddy CASSETTE PLAYER
- 1001 Glitterbust – Glitterbust LP/CASS/CD
- 1002 Adult Books – Running from the Blows CASS
- 1003 Apache – Alcatraz CASS/LP
- 1004 Dengue Fever – The Deepest Lake CASS
- 1005 The Smoking Trees – The Archer and The Bull LP/CD/CASS
- 1006 Javier Escovido – Kicked Out Of Eden CASS
- 1007 The Gooch Palms – Introverted Extroverts CASS
- 1008 Tracy Chase – Tracy Chase CASS
- 1009 The Meow Twins – Skin CASS
- 1010 The Memories – Royal United Song Service LP/CD/CASS
- 1011 Mean Jeans – Tight New Dimension CASS
- 1012 Wu-Wu – Limelite CASS
- 1013 Bleached – Welcome The Worms CASS
- 1014 Mozes and the Firstborn / Roland Cosio – Split 7"
- 1015 Yuppies Indeed – Stropharia CASS
- 1016 Audacity – Hyper Vessels CASS
- 1017 Sunflower Bean – Human Ceremony CASS
- 1018 Fat White Family – Songs For Our Mothers CASS
- 1019 Juniore – Juniore CASS
- 1020 Cosmonauts – A-OK LP/CD/CASS
- 1021 Lees of Memory – Unnecessary Evil CASS
- 1022 White Mystery – Outta Control CASS
- 1023 Explorers Club – Together CASS
- 1024 The Blank Tapes – Ojos Rojos CASS
- 1025 Danny James Etc – TBA LP/CD/CASS
- 1026 Kim Fowley – Live At Burger Records CASS
- 1027 Dallas Acid – Original Soundtrack CASS
- 1028 Lovely Bad Things – Teenage Grown Ups LP/CD/CASS
- 1029 Laure Briard – Sur la Piste de Danse CASS
- 1030 Channel – Channel CASS
- 1031 Dead Meadow – Howls From The Hills CASS
- 1032 Scully – Scully CASS
- 1033 Roya – Roya LP/CD/CASS
- 1034 Guitar Wolf – T-Rex From a Tiny Space Yojouhan CASS
- 1035 Sarah Bethe Nelson – Oh, Evolution LP/CD/CASS
- 1036 Thee Commons – Loteria Tribal CASS/CD
- 1037 Psycotic Pineapple – Live CASS
- 1038 Turbonegro – Special Education CASS
- 1039 Distractor / Tracy Bryant – Devotion 7" LATHE CUT
- 1040 Big Star – Box Set 3xCASS
- 1041 Basil & Rogers – Basil & Rogers CASS
- 1042 The Toms – The Toms CASS
- 1043 V.A. – Best of Sire Records Vol 1 CASS
- 1044 Amyl And The Sniffers – Big Attraction CASS
- 1045 Drinking Flowers – New Swirled Order CASS
- 1046 San Pedro El Cortez – Un Poco Mas De Luz CASS
- 1047 Berlin Brats – Tropically Hot b/w Psychotic 7"
- 1048 V.A. – Burger Boogaloo 2016 CASS
- 1049 The Jigsaw Seen – For The Discriminating Completist CASS
- 1050 Tobin Sprout – The Universe And Me LP/CD/CS
- 1051 Doug Tuttle – It Calls On Me CASS
- 1052 Dog Party – 'Til You're Mine CASS
- 1053 White Night – Demos CASS
- 1054 BTs – Bustin' Out CASS
- 1055 Cool Ghouls – Animal Races CASS
- 1056 Fatlip – The Loneliest Punk CASS
- 1057 Hundred Visions – Brutal Pueblo CASS
- 1058 Thor – Keep The Dogs Away CASS
- 1059 Dandy Warhols – TBA CASS
- 1060 Elephant Stone – Ship Of Fools LP/CD/CASS
- 1061 Freezing Hands – II CASS
- 1062 Hammered Satin – Strawberries N Cream 7"
- 1063 The Exbats – A Guide To Health Issues Affecting Rescue Hens CASS
- 1064 Duchess Says – Anthologie Des 3 Perchoirs / In A Fung Day T! 2FER CASS
- 1065 Star Spangles – TBA 2FER CASS
- 1066 The Tyde – Darren 4 CASS
- 1067 David Kusworth – All The Heartbreak Stories CASS
- 1068 David Kusworth and the Bounty Hunters – Wives, Weddings, And Roses CASS
- 1069 Tony Price – I Prefer Coca Cola CASS
- 1070 Trementina – 810 LP/CD/CS
- 1071 Butterscotch Cathedral – Butterscotch Cathedral CASS
- 1072 Tiger Tank – Tiger Tank CASS
- 1073 Soaked – Don't Wanna Wake Up Today CASS
- 1074 Z-Malibu Kids – TBA CASS
- 1075 VAJJ – TBA CASS
- 1076 Mr Elevator and the Brain Hotel – When The Morning Greets You CASS
- 1077 Black Randy And The Metrosquad – Pass The Dust, I Think I'm Bowie CASS
- 1078 Beat Mark – Contemporary Is Temporary CASS
- 1079 Cotillon – The Afternoons CASS
- 1080 V.A. – Burger's Best Buds 420 Comp CASS
- 1081 The Eves – E.P. CASS
- 1082 The Mystery Lights – The Mystery Lights CASS
- 1083 Jacuzzi Boys – Ping Pong CASS
- 1084 Todays Hits – Todays Hits CASS
- 1085 Outrageous Cherry – I Believe In Sunshine 7"
- 1086 Thee Oh Sees – A Weird Exits CASS
- 1087 Thee Oh Sees – Live in San Francisco CASS
- 1088 Thee Oh Sees – An Odd Entrances CASS
- 1089 Love Cop – Higher Outliers CASS
- 1090 Sam Coffey and the Iron Lungs – Sam Coffey and the Iron Lungs LP/CD/CASS
- 1091 Tiny Tim – Tiny Tim's America CASS
- 1092 Lenguas Largas – TBA CASS
- 1093 Easy Love – Easy Love CASS
- 1094 Yea-Ming and the Rumours – Baby Blue DIGI
- 1095 The Glass Family – TBA 7"
- 1096 La BOA – TBA CASS
- 1097 Johnny Thunders and the Heartbreakers – LAMF Live at the Village Gate CASS
- 1098 Panaderia – Genial CASS
- 1099 The Blondes – The Blondes CASS
- 1100 Neon King Kong – TBA CASS
- 1101 The Flytraps – Sunset Strip RIP LP/CASS
- 1102 V.A. – Burger 2017 Sampler CD
- 1103 Baby Shakes – Turn It Up CASS
- 1104 Cutty Flam – Shapes Of Sound CASS
- 1105 Iggy and the Stooges – Gimme Some Skin CASS
- 1106 The Courtneys – The Courtneys II CASS
- 1107 Thelma and the Sleaze – Somebody's Doin' Somethin' CASS
- 1108 J. Walker and the Crossguards – J. Walker and the Crossguards CASS
- 1109 Lajoie/Tuttle – American Primate CASS
- 1110 The Stitches – TBA LP/CD/CASS
- 1111 Le Shok – We Are Electrocution LP/CD/CASS
- 1112 V.A. – Burger World Israel CASS
- 1113 Blind Matty – Gringo! CASS
- 1114 Tracy Bryant – A Place For Nothing And Everything In Its Place LP/CD/CASS
- 1115 Sufis – After Hours LP/CD/CS
- 1116 V.A. – Burger World Mexico CASS
- 1117 V.A. – Best Of IAP Records CASS
- 1118 V.A. – Burger World Japan CASS
- 1119 Saba Lou – Planet Enigma CASS
- 1120 Vaadat Charigim – TBA LP/CD/CASS
- 1121 V.A. – Burger World France CASS
- 1122 The Parrots – Los Niños Sin Miedo CASS
- 1123 Puzzle – Laying In The Sand CASS
- 1124 Suburban Nightmare – Hard Day's Nightmare LP/CASS
- 1125 Once And Future Band – Once And Future Band CASS
- 1126 The Detours – TBA CASS
- 1127 La Femme – Mystére CASS
- 1128 Mind Meld – Mind Meld CASS
- 1129 Redd Kross – Oh Canada CASS
- 1130 Vanilla – Vanilla CASS
- 1131 BRGRTV x Burger Radio Themes 7"
- 1132 Kikagaku Moyo – House in the Tall Grass CASS
- 1133 Holly Overton with Midnight People – Every New Day CASS
- 1134 El Pan Blanco – Droga CASS
- 1135 Damaged Bug – Bunker Funk CASS
- 1136 Thee Oh Sees – Box Set CASS
- 1137 Mattiel – Whites Of Their Eyes 7"
- 1138 Mentallica – Mentallica CASS
- 1139 Frankie and the Witch Fingers – Heavy Roller CASS
- 1140 The Heartlights – Oh Dear CASS
- 1141 The Garden – U Want The Scoop? EP CASS
- 1142 Sweet Nobody – Loud Songs For Quiet People CASS
- 1143 Beechwood – Songs From The Land Of Nod CASS
- 1144 The Regrettes – Feel Your Feelings Fool! CASS
- 1145 The Invisible Teardrops – Cry Cry Cry CASS
- 1146 Or Edry – Kidod CASS
- 1147 Marie Mathématique – Tous Vos Lendemains Dès Aujourd'hui CASS
- 1148 Las Robertas – Waves of the New CASS
- 1149 The Broken Hearts – Lost In Little Tokyo CASS
- 1150 LA Law – Law and Order LP/CD/CASS
- 1151 Redd Kross – Teen Babes From Monsanto CASS
- 1152 The Shivas – Turn Me On EP CASS
- 1153 Plastic Pinks – All's Allright EP CASS
- 1154 Will Sprott – Ten Fingers CASS
- 1155 V.A. – Burger Records Sounds for X-Girl CASS
- 1156 William Burroughs – Let Me Hang You CASS
- 1157 Reckling – Reckling CASS
- 1158 Thee Commons – TBA CASS
- 1159 The Loons – DIamonds, Garbage And Gold CASS
- 1160 Luther Russell – Selective Memories CASS
- 1161 DFL – The Tape Show CASS
- 1162 Cannery Terror – Bipolar Babies CASS
- 1163 V.A. – Volcom Cyber Singles DIGI/CASS
- 1164 AJ Davila – TBA CASS
- 1165 Billy Changer – Best Of Fortune EP CASS
- 1166 HeartsRevolution – Revolution Rising CASS
- 1167 Thee MVPs – Receiver EP CASS
- 1168 The Grinning Ghosts – EP 1 CASS
- 1169 The Jackets – Way Out / Shadows Of Sound 2FER CASS
- 1170 Paul Williams – Someday LP/CD/CASS
- 1171 Hammered Satin – Upwards Spiral 7"
- 1172 Black Sea – Disappointing Sunset CASS
- 1173 Veneer – Yesterday's Friends CASS
- 1174 Flamin' Groovies – What The Hell's Goin' On 7"
- 1175 Mattiel – Mattiel LP/CD/CS
- 1176 Vincent Kircher – Am I Ghost CASS
- 1177 The Side Eyes – So Sick CASS
- 1178 Discoelasti – Discoelasti CASS
- 1179 V.A. – Burger World Australia CASS
- 1180 Dwarves – Take Back The Night LP/CD/CASS
- 1181 Flamin' Groovies – Fantastic Plastic CASS
- 1182 Soda Lilies – TBA CASS
- 1183 Eyelids – OR CASS
- 1184 Traumahelikopter – Competition Stripe CASS
- 1185 The Pandoras – Hey! It's The Pandoras LP/CD/CASS
- 1186 Bad Zeppelin – Bad Songs CASS
- 1187 Sweet Reaper – Street Sweeper CASS
- 1188 Winter – Jaded DIGI
- 1189 El Cortez – Temple of Doombia CASS
- 1190 Teenage Burritos – TBA LP/CD/CASS
- 1191 Panaderia – Jeanette EP CASS
- 1192 V.A. – Noar Avud 2 CASS
- 1193 Lola Pistola – Curfew CASS
- 1194 Scott Yoder – A Fool Aloof CASS
- 1195 Samira Winter – Estrella Magica LP/CD/CASS
- 1196 Puzzle – Tighten The Reigns CASS
- 1197 Jerry Rogers – Raspberry Radio CASS
- 1198 Golden Boots – Halt CASS
- 1199 Peachfuzz – On Pop Of The World CASS
- 1200 PMS And The Moodswings – PMS And The Moodswings LP/CD/CASS
- 1201 Blood Stone – Doomed Forever CASS
- 1202 Brenton Wood – Oogum Boogum CASS
- 1203 Brenton Wood – Baby You Got It CASS
- 1204 Frankie and the Witch Fingers – Brain Telephone CASS
- 1205 Dr. Boogie – Gotta Get Back To... New York City CASS
- 1205 Harsh Mistress – TBA CASS
- 1206 The Exbats – I Got The Hots For Charlie Watts CASS
- 1207 Crystales – Crystales CASS
- 1208 Prefab Messiahs – Psychsploitation... Today! CASS
- 1209 Spike Vincent – Live CASS
- 1210 Outrageous Cherry – Meet You In The Shadows LP/CD/CASS
- 1211 No Parents – Still Thirsty CASS
- 1212 Sgt Saltpeter – Tales From The Toilet LP/CASS
- 1213 Dallas Acid – Spa Hunter CASS
- 1214 The Whips – City Wide Special CASS
- 1215 Krayon – Krayon CASS
- 1216 Jeff McDonald – Jeff McDonald CASS
- 1217 Oh Sees – Orc CASS
- 1218 OCS – Memory Of A Cut Off Head CASS
- 1219 VNLVX – In Unlux CASS
- 1220 Prude Boys – TBA CASS
- 1221 Donnie Emerson – TBA 7"
- 1222 Distractor – This Time I Got It Figured Out LP/CD/CASS
- 1223 V.A. – Midtown Island Studio Vol 2 CASS
- 1224 Bart Davenport – TBA CASS
- 1225 The Salvation Army – Live LP
- 1226 Jarebear – TBA CD/CASS
- 1227 Redd Kross – Hot Issue LP/CD/CASS
- 1228 Turbonegro – RockNRoll Machine LP/CD/CASS
- 1229 Mean Jeans – Jingles CASS
- 1230 Vitamin – TBA 7"
- 1231 V.A. – Burger World Germany CASS
- 1232 Jack Drag – TBA CASS
- 1233 Timmy's Organism – TBA LP/CD/CASS
- 1234 Mozes and the Firstborn – TBA LP/CD/CASS
- 1235 Pleiades – 3 LP/CD/CASS
- 1236 MIEN – TBA CASS
- 1237 Dios – TBA LP/CD/CASS
- 1238 Peach Kelli Pop – IV CASS
- 1239 Enjoy – TBA LP/CD/CASS
- 1240 V.A. – Burger-A-Go-Go Tour 2018 CASS
- 1241 CHAI – Pink CD/CASS
- 1242 Cheap Tissue – TBA CASS
- 1244 Telephone Lovers – Two Dollar Baby / Real Action CASS
- 1431 Stripes – 520 CASS
- 1432 Thelma and The Sleeze – Fuck, Marry, Kill CASS
- 1434 Soda Boys – The Secret Years: Naked and Hopped Up On Speed In Watson's Attic
