= Adult books =

Adult books may refer to:

- Adult fiction, fiction aimed at adults
- Erotic literature
- Adult Books (band), a post-punk band from Los Angeles
- "Adult Books", a 1978 song by X

== See also ==
- Sex shop, sometimes called an adult book store
