= Soul Power (album) =

Studio album by Curtis Harding
- Released: May 6, 2014
- Recorded: 2014
- Studio: Living Room Studios; Atlanta, Georgia, U.S.
- Genre: Soul; blues; R&B
- Length: 40:42
- Label: Burger
- Producer: Curtis Harding

Curtis Harding chronology
Soul Power (2014)	Face Your Fear (2017)

Soul Power is the debut studio album by American singer Curtis Harding, released May 6, 2014, by Burger Records. It encompasses a wide breadth of genres, though it is primarily inspired by soul music and his mother's gospel singing. The album received generally favorable reviews from music critics.

== Background and development ==
Before Soul Power, Curtis Harding had worked with several artists of various genres, including backing R&B and hip hop recording artist CeeLo Green and collaborating with members of the rock bands Black Lips and Mastodon. As a child, Harding was influenced by his mother's gospel music while touring. He also sees the evolution of gospel music as parallel with the history of African Americans in the United States, as the foundation of many musical genres. "From hardship and trials, you make something beautiful," he told The 405.

According to Harding, many songs of Soul Power are inspired by relationships with his family and friends. "It's about love, love lost," he said prior to the album's release. "It's about overcoming different things." He also said that he sought to make the album accessible to broad audiences by incorporating many genres.

== Recording and release ==
In 2014, Harding recorded Soul Power at Living Room Studios in Atlanta, Georgia, with Justin McNeight and Edward Rawls. They spent two weeks and recorded 20 songs; 12 were included on the album. Randy Michael composed the music to "Keep on Shining" (with Harding's lyrics); writer Jason Reynolds worked on two songs with Harding; and Harding co-wrote several other songs.

Burger Records released Soul Power on May 6, 2014. The album's cover image is a black-and-white photograph by Hedi Slimane of Harding, shirtless, smoking a cigarette.

== Composition ==
Harding calls his musical genre "slop 'n' soul", based on the leftovers of music he has encountered; the influence of many genres is evident. His voice – kept mellow throughout the album – ranges "from smoky croon to silky falsetto." Musically, Soul Power draws primarily from classic soul music. "Foot-stomping backbeats, brassy guitar-work, and booming horns" across the album are taken from 1960s soul.

In Soul Power, examples of other genres include the indie rock guitar part of "I Don't Wanna Go Home"; the garage rock groove of "Drive My Car"; the disco style of "Heaven's on the Other Side". Classic rock and roll is featured in "Surf" (a song inspired by The Walking Dead) and "I Don't Wanna Go Home" in contrast to the balladry of "Castaway". The lyrics of the somber, gospel-inspid song "Freedom" imply a connection with roots of soul music and slavery. "Keep on Shining" is shaped by a dynamic rhythm reminiscent of northern soul paired with brass flair and falsetto backing vocals.

== Reception ==
Professional ratings
Aggregate scores
Source	Rating
Metacritic	80/100
Review scores
Source	Rating
The 405	7/10
AllMusic	4/5 stars
Blurt	4/5 stars
The Guardian	3/5 stars
The Irish Times	4/5 stars
Now	4/5 stars

Harding was commended for his voice. "Harding's ability to keep every song in line with his personable singing and no-nonsense guitar is what makes this LP truly special – well, that and the fact that there’s not a bum track on it," wrote Michael Toland of Blurt. "Harding is an undeniably versatile vocal talent, as you’d expect from someone schooled firstly in gospel choirs and then as a backing singer for CeeLo Green," wrote Tim Jonze of The Guardian. "But ... it's hard to detect what he's bringing fresh to the mix. Too often, Harding's new blues and soul sound very much like the old versions."

== Track listing ==
Adapted from AllMusic.

All tracks are written by Curtis Harding, except where noted.

No.	Title	Length
1.	"Next Time"	4:30
2.	"Castaway"	3:40
3.	"Keep on Shining" (Harding and Randy Michael)	3:23
4.	"Freedom" (Harding and Jason Reynolds)	2:43
5.	"Surf"	3:04
6.	"I Don't Wanna Go Home" (Harding and Jared Swilley)	2:16
7.	"Beautiful People"	3:22
8.	"The Drive"	3:42
9.	"Heaven's on the Other Side" (Harding and Reynolds)	3:59
10.	"Drive My Car"	2:58
11.	"I Need a Friend" (Harding and Michael)	3:13
12.	"Cruel World" (Harding and Andrew Teems)	3:52

== Personnel ==
Adapted from AllMusic.

- Cole Alexander – featured artist, guitar
- Chris Case – keyboards
- Ben Davis – clarinet, tenor saxophone
- Lucas Donaud – logo
- Darren English – trumpet
- Curtis Harding – composer, guitar, mixing, primary artist, producer
- Justin McNeight – engineer, mastering, mixing, percussion
- Taylor Kennedy – baritone saxophone
- Randy Michael – composer
- Tyler Morris – guitar
- Noah Pine – keyboards
- Edward Rawls – engineer, mastering, mixing
- Jason Reynolds – composer
- Hedi Slimane – photography
- Jared Swilley – bass, composer, featured artist
- Andrew Teems – composer, guitar
- Sean Thompson – bass, guitar
- Curtis Whitehead – bass
- Caleb Williams – trumpet

== Charts ==
Chart (2014)	Peak position
Belgian Albums (Ultratop Flanders)	156
French Albums (SNEP)	82
Dutch Albums (Album Top 100)	43
