= It's Not Over =

It's Not Over may refer to:

== Songs ==
- "It's Not Over" (Daughtry song), 2006
- "It's Not Over" (Reba McEntire song), 1984, also recorded by Mark Chesnutt in 1992
- "It's Not Over" (Curtis Harding song), 2018
- "It's Not Over" (Rockmelons song), 1992
- "It's Not Over", 2007 song by Secondhand Serenade, from the album Awake
- "It's Not Over ('Til It's Over)", 1987 single by Starship, from the album No Protection

== Albums ==
- It's Not Over (Luong Bich Huu album), 2008
- It's Not Over (Debelah Morgan album), 1998
- It's Not Over (Karen Clark Sheard album), 2006, and the title song
- It's Not Over (Shooting Star album), 1991
- It's Not Over, 1995 album by Bobby DeBarge, and the title song

== See also ==
- "It's Not Over Yet", Klaxons cover of the Grace song "Not Over Yet"
