= Traps (album) =

Studio album by Jaill
- Released: June 12, 2012
- Genre: Indie rock, Indie pop
- Length: 36:32
- Label: Sub Pop

Jaill chronology
That's How We Burn (2010)	Traps (2012)	Brain Cream (2015)

Traps is the third full-length album released on June 12, 2012 by the Milwaukee-based band Jaill, and their third release on US label Sub Pop.

== Track listing ==
No.	Title	Length
1.	"Waste a Lot of Things"	2:57
2.	"Everyone's a Bitch"	2:39
3.	"Perfect Ten"	2:51
4.	"Horrible Things (Make Pretty Songs)"	2:26
5.	"I'm Home"	3:18
6.	"House with Haunting"	2:45
7.	"Madness"	2:20
8.	"Million Times"	3:13
9.	"Ten Teardrops"	3:11
10.	"While You Reload"	3:49
11.	"Stone Froze Mascot"	3:30
12.	"Lazy River" (bonus track)	3:33
Total length:		36:32
