= Habibi (band) =

American psychedelic rock band

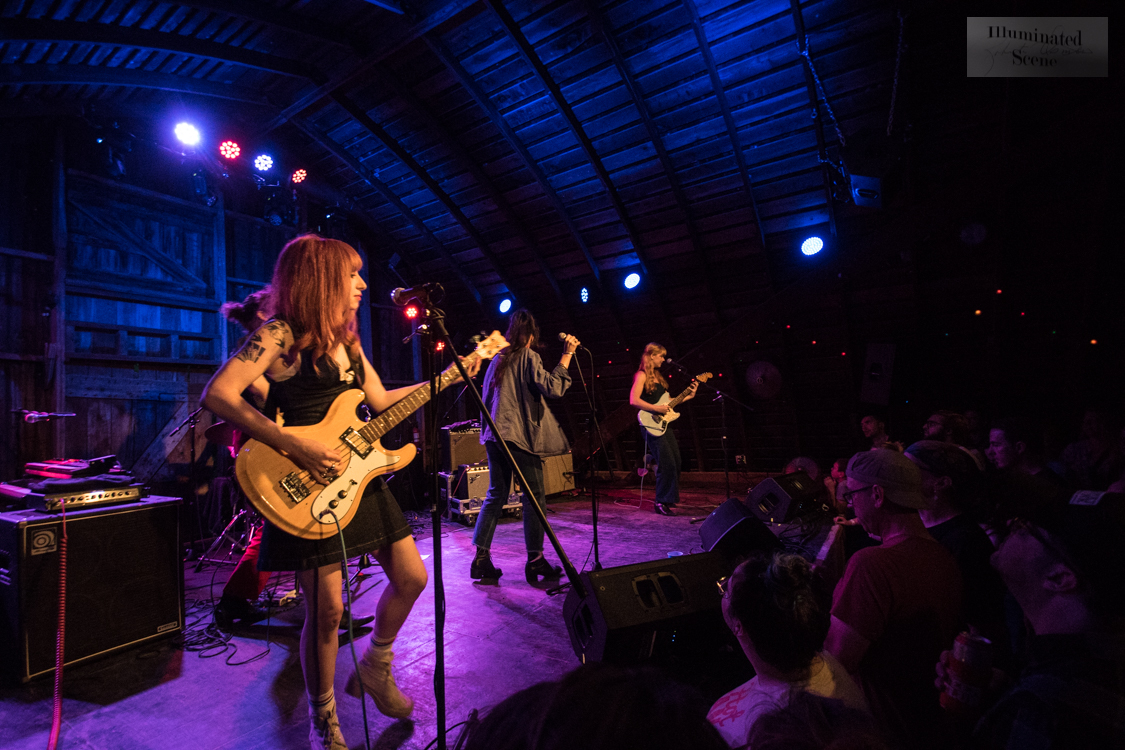

Background information
- Origin: Brooklyn, New York, United States
- Genres: Psychedelic rock/pop, garage rock, girl group
- Years active: 2011–present
- Labels: Burger, Born Bad, Kill Rock Stars
- Members: Rahill Jamalifard; Lenaya Lynch; Lyla Vander; Ana Becker; Yukary
- Past members: Caroline Partamian; Erin Campbell; Leah Beth Fishman; Karen Isabel

Habibi is an American rock band from Brooklyn, New York. They are a blend of psychedelic rock and sixties girl group harmonies. The word habibi means "my love," an Arabic word that vocalist Rahill Jamalifard grew up using despite speaking Persian with her parents.

== Career ==
In 2011, former Detroiters Lenaya Lynch and Rahill Jamalifard decided to form a band blending their love of psychedelic garage rock and girl group harmonies. They joined Erin Campbell and Karen Isabel, musicians from the Brooklyn rock and roll scene, who both went to LaGuardia School of the Arts. They grew in popularity and found themselves playing the SXSW festival in Austin and the CMJ festival. They signed to Born Bad Records and released the self-titled 7-inch, Habibi.

In 2012, Habibi's song "Sweetest Talk" was featured in actor/director James Franco's short film series Episodes of an Untitled Film. Lynch left the band due to an emergency in 2012 and Habibi found a replacement with the guitarist Caroline Partamian, who toured with the band for a year and until the return of Lynch in 2013. In 2014, Burger Records released their debut full-length LP, Habibi.

== Influences ==
The sound of Habibi is influenced both by the garage rock/girl group sounds from Detroit as well as the Middle Eastern melody structures that were shared by Lynch and Jamalifard, who is of Iranian descent. Jamalifard influences are also related to her ancestry mentioning “Iran, gypsies, nomads, the inspiration of poets like Hafez . . . my travels within the country.” In 2012, Interview Magazine wrote "Influenced by grunge, punk, hip-hop, and Motown, Habibi's sound—and band members—meet somewhere in the middle."

== Members ==
=== Current line-up ===
- Rahill Jamalifard - Lead Vocals, Tambourine
- Lenaya "Lenny" Lynch - Guitar, Vocals
- Lyla Vander - Drums
- Ana Becker - Guitar, Vocals
- Yukary - Bass

=== Past members ===
- Caroline Partamian - Guitar, Vocals
- Erin Campbell - Bass, Guitar, Vocals
- Karen Isabel - Drums

== Discography ==
=== Studio albums ===
- Habibi (Burger, 2014)
- Anywhere But Here (Muddguts, 2020)
- Dreamachine (Kill Rock Stars, 2024)

=== EPs ===
- Habibi (2012)
- La Luz / Habibi (2015)
- Cardamom Garden (2018)

== See also ==
- Burger Records discography
