= Fletcher C. Johnson =

American drummer

- Notable work: Salutations(2012), It Rained Something Wicked(2013), Lessons in Tenderness(2016)

Fletcher C. Johnson is an American songwriter based in Brooklyn, New York. In live settings, Johnson performs with his eponymously-named three piece band.

== Career ==
Fletcher C. Johnson grew up in Brattleboro, Vermont before relocating to Brooklyn. In concert, Fletcher C. Johnson is joined by Todd Martin on bass, John Dougherty on drums, and Adam Meisterhans on lead guitar. Johnson's debut album, Salutations was released on Burger Records in 2012. In 2013, Burger released Johnson's sophomore album It Rained Something Wicked. Fletcher C. Johnson's third album Lesson In Tenderness, which took three years to complete, was recorded after an extensive tour of the East Coast of the United States. Fletcher C. Johnson has shared stages with Parquet Courts and King Gizzard & The Lizard Wizard.

== Discography ==
- Salutations (2012)
- It Rained Something Wicked (2013)
- Lessons in Tenderness (2016)
