= There's No Sky (Oh My My) =

Studio album by Jaill
- Released: 2009; Apr 27, 2010 (Reissue)
- Recorded: 2008
- Genre: Indie rock
- Length: 33:24
- Label: Burger Records (Reissue)

Professional ratings
Review scores
Source	Rating
The Styrofoam Drone	link
The Tape	(Positive) link

There's No Sky (Oh My My) is the first full-length album by indie rock band Jaill. Originally released under the name Jail. The album had a very limited release in 2009 as a "small-press hand made copy". It would later be reissued on Burger Records in 2010, on both cassette and vinyl formats.

== Track listing ==
No.	Title	Length
1.	"There's No Sky (Oh My My)"	2:37
2.	"Beggar Sincere"	2:44
3.	"Always Wrong"	2:53
4.	"Stuffed"	2:42
5.	"No Mindless Love"	3:08
6.	"The Biggest Nugget Of Them All"	2:54
7.	"Pardono"	2:33
8.	"We've Won"	3:24
9.	"Suave Losin' It"	2:59
10.	"All It Was"	2:42
11.	"Out Of Your Boots"	2:01
12.	"Love Takes Shots"	2:47
