= Adult Books (band) =

American post-punk band

Adult Books is a post-punk band from Los Angeles, California. It was started by Nick Winfrey.

== History ==
While he played in different Southern California bands, Winfrey wrote multiple songs that were gentler than those of the punk bands he was playing in. The band is named after the X song of the same name. The band's first release was a self-titled EP released on Lolipop Records in 2012. The band released their first full-length album, Running From the Blows, on March 4, 2016, on both Lolipop Records and Burger Records. Winfrey has said that, in writing the songs on this album, he was inspired by late 70's/early 80's British punk bands, such as Television Personalities.

== Discography ==
=== Studio albums ===
- Running from the Blows (2016)
- Grecian Urn (2021)

=== Extended plays ===
- Demo 2011 (2012)
- Adult Books (2012)
