= Back by Unpopular Demand =

2013–15 concert tour by the Replacements

- Tour by The Replacements
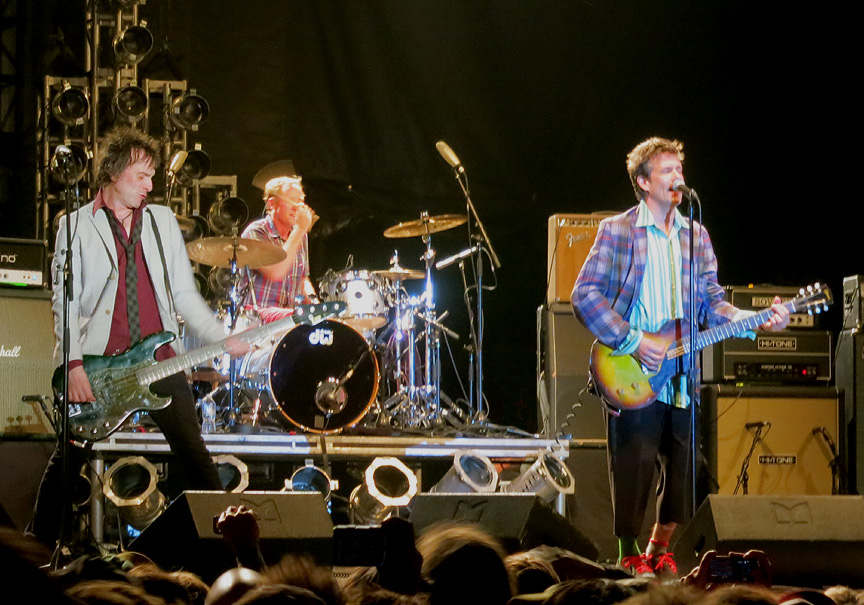
- The Replacements performing in Toronto 2013
- Start date: August 25, 2013
- End date: June 5, 2015
- Legs: 4
- No. of shows: 29 in North America; 5 in Europe; 34 total

Back by Unpopular Demand was a concert tour by alternative rock band the Replacements. It marks the first tour for the band since they broke up in 1991.

== History ==
In late 2011, rumors began to circulate that the Replacements were considering to reunite. Tommy Stinson mentioned in an interview that year "if a reunion happens, it happens. If the planets align and the oceans don't swallow up the earth first.". On October 3, 2012, it was announced that the Replacements had reformed and that Westerberg and Tommy Stinson were in the studio recording an EP containing song cover versions. Titled Songs for Slim, the EP was sold in a 250-copy edition of 10" vinyl and auctioned online to benefit former bandmate Dunlap, who had suffered a stroke.

On June 13, 2013, Riot Fest announced that the Replacements would be headlining the three incarnations of the fest in Toronto, Chicago, and Denver. Dave Minehan, guitarist/vocalist of Boston-based band The Neighborhoods, and drummer Josh Freese rounded out the line-up for these shows.

Festival appearances were announced throughout 2014, including performances at Coachella, Osheaga, and Austin City Limits As well as solo headlining shows at Saint Paul's Midway Stadium and New York City's Forest Hills Stadium. The Midway Stadium concert sold out within minutes.

On February 9, 2015 the band announced a spring tour of the United States and Europe, including headlining performances at the Primavera Sound festival in Spain and Portugal on May 28 and June 5, 2015, the band's first show in Portugal. On this tour, they debuted several unreleased songs. Westerberg announced on stage in Porto that it was the group's final live performance on June 5, 2015.

== Critical reception ==
The tour received overwhelmingly positive reviews from many critics and newsletters. Caryn Rose of Jukebox Graduate wrote "It has been so long since you heard it live, since you got to sing it next to other people who love this song as much as you do. Even if you never stopped listening to the Replacements, or caring about this music, what was missing was being in the same place with other people who felt the same way about it as you did. The audience tonight was filled with people I know or am on nodding acquaintance with from seeing them at other shows by other bands, and it's not accidental or surprising that they all converged here tonight."

== Opening acts ==
- The Hold Steady (Saint Paul and New York City)
- Lucero (Saint Paul)
- Deer Tick (New York City)
- Descendents (Tempe)
- Switchfoot (Tempe)
- The Young Fresh Fellows (Seattle and Portland)
- John Doe (San Francisco and Los Angeles)
- together PANGEA (Los Angeles)
- Teenage Bottlerocket (Denver)
- Dinosaur Jr. (Cambridge)
- The Young Leaves (Cambridge)
- Smoking Popes (Chicago)
- Midnight Reruns (Milwaukee)
- The Silks (Detroit)
- J Roddy Walston and the Business (Washington, D.C. and Philadelphia)
- Superchunk (Philadelphia)
- Jesse Malin (Amsterdam and London)
- You Am I (London)

== Tour dates ==
Date	City	Country	Venue
Leg 1: Riot Fest
August 25, 2013	Toronto	Canada	Fort York
September 15, 2013	Chicago	United States	Humboldt Park
September 21, 2013	Byers	United States	May Farms
Leg 2: North American Festival Tour
April 11, 2014	Indio	United States	Coachella Valley Music and Arts Festival
April 18, 2014	Indio	United States	Coachella Valley Music and Arts Festival
May 10, 2014	Atlanta	United States	Shaky Knees
July 20, 2014	Louisville	United States	Forecastle Festival
August 3, 2014	Montreal	Canada	Osheaga Festival
August 31, 2014	Seattle	United States	Bumbershoot
September 7, 2014	Boston	United States	Boston Calling
September 13, 2014	Saint Paul	United States	Midway Stadium
September 19, 2014	New York City	United States	Forest Hills Stadium
September 27, 2014	Tempe	United States	Marquee Theatre | Summer Ends Festival
October 5, 2014	Austin	United States	Austin City Limits
October 12, 2014	Austin	United States	Austin City Limits
Leg 3: Back By Unpopular Demand Spring Tour
April 9, 2015	Seattle	United States	The Paramount Theatre
April 10, 2015	Portland	United States	Crystal Ballroom
April 13, 2015	San Francisco	United States	Nob Hill Masonic Center
April 15, 2015	Los Angeles	United States	Hollywood Palladium
April 16, 2015	Los Angeles	United States	Hollywood Palladium
April 19, 2015	Denver	United States	Fillmore Auditorium
April 27, 2015	Cambridge	United States	The Sinclair
April 29, 2015	Chicago	United States	Riviera Theatre
April 30, 2015	Chicago	United States	Riviera Theatre
May 2, 2015	Milwaukee	United States	The Eagles Ballroom
May 3, 2015	Detroit	United States	The Fillmore
May 8, 2015	Washington, D.C.	United States	Echostage
May 9, 2015	Philadelphia	United States	Penn's Landing
Leg 4: Europe
May 28, 2015	Barcelona	Spain	Primavera Sound
May 30, 2015	Amsterdam	Netherlands	Paradiso
June 2, 2015	London	England	Roundhouse
June 3, 2015	London	England	Roundhouse
June 5, 2015	Porto	Portugal	NOS Primavera Sound

== Cancelled Tour dates ==
Date	City	Country	Venue
North America
May 5, 2015	Pittsburgh	United States	Stage AE
May 6, 2015	Columbus	United States	Lifestyle Communities Pavilion
