= That's How We Burn =

Studio album by Jaill
- Released: July 27, 2010
- Genre: Indie rock
- Length: 32:12
- Label: Sub Pop Records

Jaill chronology
There's No Sky (Oh My My)	That's How We Burn

Professional ratings
Review scores
Source	Rating
The A.V. Club	(B+) link
Pitchfork Media	link
Spin	link

That's How We Burn is the second full-length album by indie rock band Jaill. The album was released on Sub Pop Records on July 27, 2010, on both compact disc and vinyl formats.

== Track listing ==
No.	Title	Length
1.	"The Stroller"	3:45
2.	"Everyone's Hip"	2:33
3.	"On The Beat"	3:33
4.	"Thank Us Later"	3:21
5.	"Summer Mess"	1:45
6.	"She's My Baby"	2:14
7.	"Snake Shakes"	3:55
8.	"Demon"	2:42
9.	"Baby I"	2:41
10.	"How's The Grave"	3:05
11.	"That's How We Burn"	2:48
