= It's Not Over (Curtis Harding song) =

Single by Curtis Harding
- Released: June 5, 2018
- Genre: Soul
- Length: 3:53
- Label: Anti-; Epitaph

Curtis Harding singles chronology
"Go As You Are" (2017)	"It's Not Over" (2018)

"It's Not Over" is a song recorded by American soul singer Curtis Harding. It was released digitally as a single on June 5, 2018, by Anti- and Epitaph Records in advance of Harding's tour opening for Lenny Kravitz.

Anchored in soul with funk and psychedelic flourishes, the song is optimistic: "You may think it's over, but it's not the end," Harding sings. Music critics commended his vocals and the song's composition and production.

== Composition ==
"It's Not Over" is built out of a bassline with funk-tinged guitar and organ; brief synthesizer parts add to the song's psychedelic nature. Called "buoyant" and "soulful" and featuring an upbeat brass section, the song is representative of Harding's sound: soul music augmented with attributes from psychedelia and a "judicious approach to arrangement." Compared to his previous songs, some compositional choices made "It's Not Over" a smoother tune—like what reviewer Russell Rockwell called "oozing lava lamp riffs", "velvety backing vocals", and a "discotheque vibraphone riff". A Spanish-language music website wrote that the song "seduced us with elegant sound waves that flirt with the psychedelic".

Lyrically, the song is uplifting, and brass hits add to the positive tone. As Harding accepts the exhaustion of those in need of reprieve, he encourages everyone to carry on: "Though life has its struggles / And its ups and downs / See, you are the fighter, baby / It's only the first round." His delivery was compared to his contemporaries Michael Kiwanuka and Leon Bridges.

== Release and promotion ==
As a single, "It's Not Over" was released jointly by Anti- and Epitaph Records on June 5, 2018. The single cover shows a recumbent Harding wearing a Gucci suit. "It's Not Over" marked Harding's first release of new music since his studio album Face Your Fear in October 2017, songs from which he had performed the previous day in a concert in Mexico. The release of "It's Not Over" came in advance of Harding's concert tour supporting Lenny Kravitz, which began in Poland on June 8. Harding performed "It's Not Over" at some of the venues supporting Kravitz.

== Critical reception ==
In Clash, Robin Murray wrote, "It's a driven return, a solid return, one infused by a future-facing sense of what 'soul' can mean in 21st-century songwriting." Oregon Public Broadcasting's Kelsey Greco wrote that the song "has an undeniable groove that will pull you to the dance floor, all the while blending in progressive production choices that keep close listeners intrigued."

The alternative culture website Afropunk called the song "an impossibly groovy romantic jam filled with soul, love, and desperation, because love is pretty much all about making an ass of yourself." The website said the song stemmed from classic soul music while "Harding's soaring vocals are still somehow refreshing and original." A Spanish-language site said, "Curtis Harding showed us what it means to compose and create soul in our time."

== Release history ==
Territory	Date	Format(s)	Label
Worldwide	June 5, 2018	Digital download	Anti- / Epitaph
