= The Lovely Bad Things =

American indie rock band

- Origin: La Mirada, California, U.S.
- Genres: Punk rock, indie rock, pop punk
- Years active: 2009–present
- Members: Camron Ward; Brayden Ward; Lauren Curtius; Tim Hatch
- Website: www.thelovelybadthings.com

The Lovely Bad Things were an American indie rock band from La Mirada, California. Formed in 2009, the group consists of brothers Camron and Brayden Ward, Tim Hatch and Lauren Curtius. All members are multi-instrumentalists and play guitar, bass and drums. They are known for switching between instruments often during live performances. Their garage rock sound has been called everything from proto-punk to surf punk. Chris Martins of Spin magazine online wrote, "If Pixies were Los Angeles surf punks instead of Boston smartypantses, they might've sounded a lot like the Lovely Bad Things." The band's personal influences include Sonic Youth, Modest Mouse, Dinosaur Jr, the B-52's, The Wipers, and Redd Kross.

== History ==
The Lovely Bad Things formed in October 2009 after Camron and Brayden Ward's band had broken up. They paired up with longtime friends Lauren Curtius and Tim Hatch who were also between bands. The band's name was derived from the Mary Downing Hahn book "All The Lovely Bad Ones" and a computer glitch or typo. Camron Ward explains in a 2011 OC Weekly interview with Taylor Hamby: I was at Borders (Books), rest in peace, and I walked over to the children's section. There were all these Halloween books out, and there was one called All the Lovely Bad Ones. It's about ghosts -we all really should read it at some point— and we were all sitting on the porch, and we were like, "We need to think of a name," and I said, "Well, I really liked this book. It might be a good band name." They were like, "Yeah, that's cool." All of our old recordings were done on a video camera, and we just ripped the audio off the video. [When we uploaded the video], the folder on the computer was titled Lovely Bad Things.

Deeply involved in the DIY music movement, the group has played in small and large venues and when no gigs were available created house shows at their rehearsal garage space they named The Lovely Bad Pad. The first songs, all reflecting a raw surf punk / punk sound, like Kevin, Cocaine Werewolf Super Awesome Fun Time, Ugly Kids and Cult Life, were written quickly and would eventually end up on their first cassette offering entitled Shark Week which was first released (Dec. 2010) on the now defunct UVR label and then later picked up by Burger Records. That same year they would share the stage with bands such as Screaming Females, Audacity, The So So Glos, The Garden, La Sera, and Ty Segall and (in 2011) lent tour support forPeter Bjorn and John (All You Can Eat Tour).

In July 2011, their EP New Ghost / Old Waves was released on Cassette though Burger Records and on November 18, 2011 the band signed with Volcom Entertainment who released New Ghost / Old Waves digitally and on Vinyl March 9, 2012. The 7 song EP is described as diverse "jangly beach- pop", "surf, Riot Grrrl, punk and indie" with harmonies and fast past guitar driven songs. Lyrically, songs like "I Just Want You to Go Away" and "You Done Messed Up" are steeped in youthful angst. On Jan 3rd of 2012, Kai Flanders of the LA Weekly names New Ghost / Old Waves in the Top 5 L.A. Punk Albums of 2011. and the same year, their track "I Just Want You to Go Away" was featured on MTV's Awkward TV series.

On April 27, 2012, the band was added to the roster of artists playing the prestigious Primavera SoundMusic Festival in Barcelona, Spain. Unable to afford to go, the band took to crowd funding through Indiegogo as well as playing fund raising shows. 2012 had the band share stages with the likes of King Tuff, Zig Zags, Shannon and the Clams, TRMRS, The Summer Twins and lent tour support for The Cribs and Los Campesinos.

The band started recording the songs for their 3rd release and first label released full length in mid 2012 at Jonny Bell's (from Crystal Antlers) studio in Long Beach, California. The album was engineered and produced by "Sloppy" Jon B. Gilberts who also produced and engineered New Ghosts / Old Waves. "The Late Great Whatever" was released on Feb. 26, 2013 through Volcom Entertainment. From the first song, Hear or Anywhere with its prog punk aesthetic and pop heart to the final 12th song Styx and Branches it is considered to be a furious and infectious garage rock album that draws inspiration from psychedelic surf and punk. The album is also decidedly more heavy and hardcore than New Ghost / Old waves says Brayden Ward, “When people listened to it, we wanted it to feel like how it felt when we were writing it and what it felt like when we were writing it was that it was just a little bit dark, and not brooding, black and noir, just a little darker than New Ghost/Old Waves.”

On April 17, 2013, the band opened up for the legendary Dinosaur Jr, fulfilling a dream of Camron Ward's, stating on stage, "I don't mean to get all mushy or anything... (but) when I was 13 I set the goal, the only thing I ever wanted to do was play with Dinosaur Jr." The Lovely Bad Things finished out the year on tour with Diarrhea Planet and Best Coast.

== Releases ==
- Shark Week released September 8, 2010 on cassette via UVR
- New Ghost/Old Waves EP released July 2011 on cassette via Burger Records
- Fried Eyes 3 Song EP released Jan. 24, 2013
- The Late Great Whatever (Digital, CD and Vinyl) released February 2013 on Volcom Entertainment (via cassette on Burger Records).

== On compilations ==
- KXLU 88.9 FM LIVE at FIVE (Studio Performances) Released December, 2012 featuring: The Soft Pack, Wide Streets, Meat Market, Zig Zags, Tamaryn, Jaill, Pangea, The Lovely Bad Things, Mr. Elevator and the Brain Hotel, Ides of Gemini, Devin, Father John Misty, Dum Dum Girls
- 2012: Mixtape # 19: Plastic Brains (featuring No Bunny, Air waves, Nallo, Crystal Stilts, The Equals, La Sera, Lower Dens, Cass McCombs, Tiki Men, The Lovely Bad Things, The Soft Pack, Neo Boys, Grass Widow, Mikal Cronin, The Happy Thoughts, Paul Kane, Ganglians, Dean and Britta, Laughing Man)
- 2012: The Kitty Comp for Abandoned Kitten (Featuring Ryan Adams, Veloura Caywood, John Wesley Coleman, The Vomettes, Audacity, Lenguas Largas, The Resonars, Dead Ghosts, The Abigails, Joel Gion, Cleaners From Venus, The Pizazz, Summer Twins, together PANGEA, Mikal Cronin, Sea Lions, Devon Williams, Wyatt Blair, Teenage Burritos, MHV, Penetration Moon, Schlitzie, Miss Chain and the Broken Heels, Tomorrows Tulips, Part Time, Nick Nicely, Brentwood Dan, Babies on Acid, Burnt Ones, Peach Kelli Pop, Goochi Boiz, White Mystery, The Coathangers, Blue Jungle, Apache, The Stalkers, Bell Gardens, Beekler, Peter Case, The Zoltars, The Be Helds, Lust-Cats of the Gutters, Soviet, Apple Brains, The Lovely Bad Things, So Wrong, Crystal Antlers, Young Guv, Slumber Party, Meow Twins)

== Other media ==
- Annenberg Radio News : Orange County's Lovely Bad Things Celebrate Local Scene by Kat Bouza 2/26/13
- BRGR TV Episode 13 "The Fun Fun" Interviewed by Multa Mohan of KXLU 88.9 FM

== Charts ==
- CSJW - Top 50 (rank 10) Feb 27, 2012 "New Ghosts / Old Waves"
- BillBoard Mag Next Big Sound Top 50 (rank 13) March 7, 2013
- CMJ- Top 20 (ranked number 8) week ending 3/22/13 "The Late Great Whatever"

== Festivals ==
- Silverlake Jubilee - Silverlake, Ca. 2011
- Moon Block Party 2011 - Pomona, Ca. 2011
- Fuck Yeah Festival - Downtown Los Angeles, Ca. 2012
- SXSW - Austin, Texas 2012
- Primavera Sound - Barcelona, Spain 2012
- SXSW- Austin, Texas 2013
- Viva Pomona - Pomona, Ca. 2013
- Burgerama 2 - Santa Ana, Ca. 2013
- Noise Pop Festival - San Francisco, Ca. 2013
- Burgerama 3 - Santa Ana, Ca. 2014
