= Face Your Fear =

Studio album by Curtis Harding
- Released: October 27, 2017
- Genre: Soul
- Length: 41:15
- Label: Anti-
- Producer: Sam Cohen, Danger Mouse, Curtis Harding, Nic Jodoin

Curtis Harding chronology
Soul Power (2014)	Face Your Fear (2017)	If Words Were Flowers (2021)

Face Your Fear is the second studio album by American singer Curtis Harding, released October 27, 2017, by Anti-.

== Reception ==
Professional ratings
Aggregate scores
Source	Rating
Metacritic	80/100
Review scores
Source	Rating
AllMusic	4.5/5 stars
Clash	8/10
The Guardian	3/5 stars
PopMatters	8/10 stars

Mark Deming writes, "Curtis Harding can write and sing like a soul man with a mind of his own, and here he sounds even more open, expressive, and fearless than he did on his very fine debut. Face Your Fear ups the ante for Harding, bumping him from promising newcomer to major artist, and if you like good songs played and sung with true conviction, you won't want to sleep on this." The song, "On and On" was used for the ending scene of the Disney+ MCU television series, The Falcon and the Winter Soldier.

== Track listing ==
Adapted from AllMusic.

All tracks are written by Sam Cohen and Curtis Harding, except where noted.

No.	Title	Length
1.	"Wednesday Morning Atonement" (Brian Burton, Cohen and Harding)	4:28
2.	"Face Your Fear"	3:54
3.	"On and On"	4:01
4.	"Go as You Are"	3:58
5.	"Till the End"	3:11
6.	"Need Your Love"	2:57
7.	"Dream Girl"	3:22
8.	"Welcome to My World"	3:36
9.	"Ghost of You"	4:29
10.	"Need My Baby"	3:17
11.	"As I Am" (Harding and Nic Jodoin)	4:02

== Personnel ==
Adapted from AllMusic.

- Josh Aguiar – trumpet
- John Anderson – celesta, guitar
- Sasami Ashworth – string arrangements
- Chris Camacho – bass
- David Christian – drums
- Sam Cohen – bass, composer, drums, guitar, keyboards, mixing, producer
- Matthew Correia – photography
- Danger Mouse – composer, producer
- Tomas Dolas – organ
- Jeremy Gill – saxophone
- Curtis Harding – composer, guitar, primary artist, producer, vocals
- Trevor Hernandez – design
- Oliver Hill – viola, violin
- Nic Jodoin – composer, producer
- Ali Jones – cello
- Joe LaPorta – mastering
- Amber Mark – background vocals
- Raymond Mason – French horn, trombone
- Nick Murray – drums
- Elizabeth Pupo-Walker – percussion
- Gillian Rivers – violin
- Hedi Slimane – cover photo
- Derek Stein – cello
- Matt Zuk – guitar

== Charts ==
Chart (2014)	Peak position
US Heatseekers Albums (Billboard)	21
Belgian Albums (Ultratop Flanders)	111
Belgian Albums (Ultratop Wallonia)	152
French Albums (SNEP)	79
Dutch Albums (Album Top 100)	43
Swiss Albums (Schweizer Hitparade)	78
