= Curtis Harding =

American singer and songwriter (born 1979)

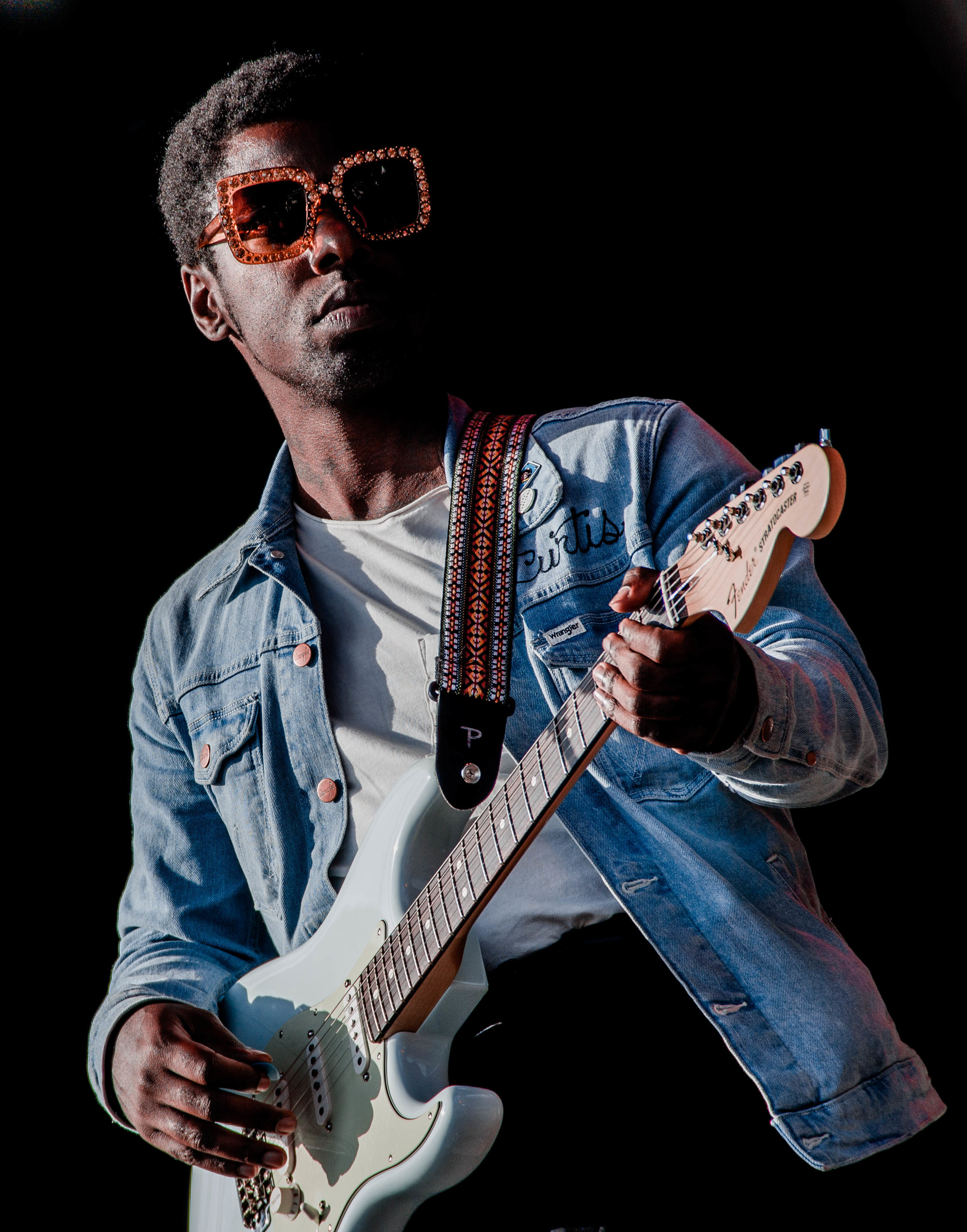
- Harding performing in 2018

Background information
- Born: June 11, 1979 (age 47); Saginaw, Michigan, U.S.
- Genre: Soul
- Occupations: Singer-songwriter; actor
- Instruments: Vocals; drums; guitar; tambourine
- Years active: 2002–present
- Labels: Burger Records; Anti-
- Website: www.curtisharding.com

Curtis Harding (born June 11, 1979) is an American singer and songwriter. Primarily a soul artist, his "slop 'n' soul" style carries the influence of genres including blues, gospel, psychedelia, R&B, and rock. His first album, Soul Power (2014), was followed by Face Your Fear in 2017, with production from Danger Mouse and Sam Cohen.

Harding was born in Saginaw, Michigan, and his family settled in Atlanta when he was a teenager. He was exposed to music at an early age as his family toured with his mother, who was a gospel singer. In the 2000s, Harding backed CeeLo Green, and he formed the R&B/garage rock band Night Sun in Atlanta with Black Lips members in 2009.

== Early life ==
Harding was born on June 11, 1979, in Saginaw, Michigan. His father is a mechanic, and his mother, Dorothy, is a gospel singer. He and his five siblings were raised as Mennonites. They moved to Alabama when he was three, then to Arizona, California, Texas, and other parts of the United States. His family had no permanent residence until they settled in Atlanta, Georgia, when he was 14.

His mother toured in a van, stopping to sing at churches and work at homeless shelters. Though he originally wanted to play professional sports, Harding grew up around his mother's music, occasionally joining her on stage as a backing singer until age 15. His family would stay – sometimes for months – at communities with churches of any denomination. Harding's sister, an amateur rapper, introduced him to secular music.

Harding told The Austin Chronicle that growing up around older people – his father is 27 years older than his mother – gave him an early sense of maturity: "My goal when I was a kid was to be an old man. That's what I was around. I wanted to be that old guy sitting on the porch."

== Career ==
=== 2000s collaborations ===
In Atlanta in the early 2000s, Harding was part of the hip-hop group Proseed. He met singer CeeLo Green while doing promotion for LaFace Records, and he rapped on some songs off Green's 2002 album Cee-Lo Green and His Perfect Imperfections along with several Proseed members. He toured with Green as a backing singer on the 2002 Smokin' Grooves Tour alongside Outkast, Cypress Hill, Lauryn Hill, and The Roots. He also sang on Green's 2010 album The Lady Killer, including co-writing the bonus track "Grand Canyon".

He moved to Toronto in 2008 to reinvigorate his musical creativity. While he was in Canada, he bought a guitar and began writing songs without commercial aspirations. He returned to Atlanta in 2009 and formed the band Night Sun, which mixes rhythm and blues and garage rock, with guitarist Cole Alexander of Black Lips, performing several shows in East Atlanta and Little Five Points. The band's lineup would grow to consist of Harding (vocals, guitar), Alexander (vocals, bass), drummer Joe Bradley of Black Lips, and Night Beats guitarist Danny Lee Blackwell. In 2013, the seasoned underground rock group recorded the single "No Pressure"/"On My Way" for the indie label Burger Records. Harding co-wrote "I Don't Wanna Go Home" with Jared Swilley originally for the Black Lips' 2014 album Underneath the Rainbow.

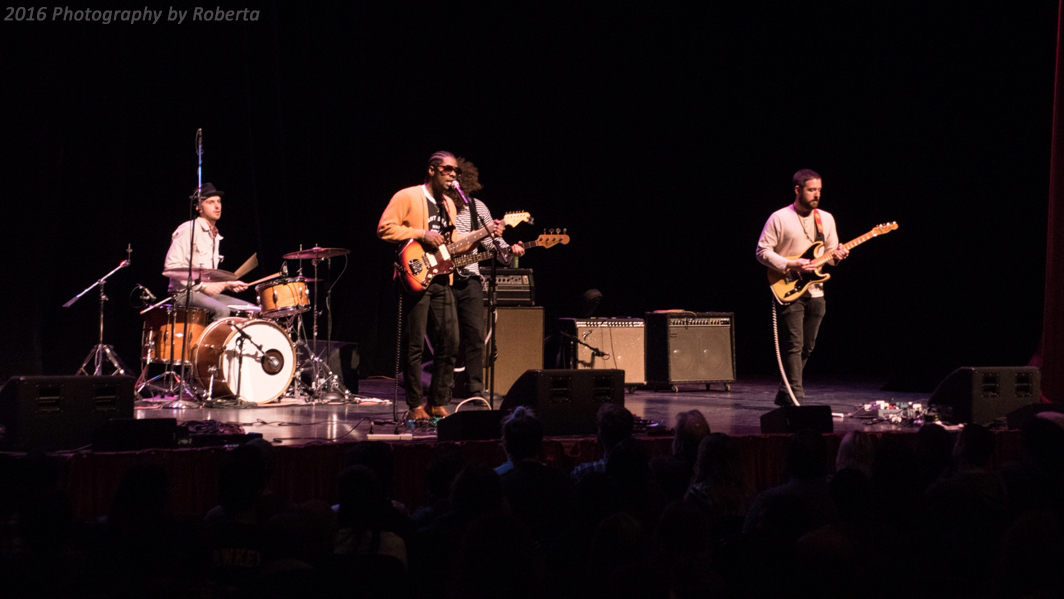
Harding performing in February 2016

=== 2014–present: Solo studio albums ===
Harding spent two weeks at Living Room Studios in Atlanta recording twenty songs in 2014, twelve of which were included on his debut album, titled Soul Power and released by Burger Records on May 6, 2014. The album's reception was generally favorable, with critics noting its fusion of many musical genres. "Keep on Shining" was one of the singles the album produced; he performed the song live on the French talk show C à vous in February 2015.

While at The Growlers' annual Beach Goth festival, Harding met fashion photographer Hedi Slimane. Harding was recruited as the face of Yves Saint Laurent's Paris Music Project for 2015. For the project (in addition to portraits) Slimane produced a video featuring Harding and the song "Next Time" from Soul Power. He also photographed Harding for the album's cover.

His second album, Face Your Fear, was released by Anti- on October 27, 2017. He recorded the album at Danger Mouse's 30th Century Studio in New York City. Face Your Fear spent one week on the Billboard Heatseekers Albums chart at number 21. NPR Music named the album one of the best ten R&B albums of 2017. Music critic Ken Tucker said that Harding's earnestness in the album, tone and emphasis changes, and direct singing suggest both comfort in and knowledge of classic R&B.

Its opening track, "Wednesday Morning Atonement", was produced by Danger Mouse and Sam Cohen. Recorded on a Wednesday morning, the song is about a father missing his children, a metaphor for Harding's time neglecting to record another album. GQ's Shakeil Greeley described the album's title track ("Face Your Fear") as "the rare song that could soundtrack a wedding or a funeral, at once celebratory, sad, groovy, and of course, very soulful." Greeley wrote that the mood of the album ranges from classic soul in "On and On" and "Need Your Love" to sadness in "Welcome to My World", with a cinematic psychedelic feel to other songs. Harding performed "Need Your Love" as a guest musician with Stay Human on The Late Show with Stephen Colbert in January 2018.

In advance of Harding's support of Lenny Kravitz on tour throughout 2018, Harding released the single "It's Not Over" on June 5. Clash's Robin Murray wrote that the song was "a driven return, a solid return". In 2019, Harding headlined the finale of Spoleto Festival USA in Charleston, South Carolina.

== Musical style ==
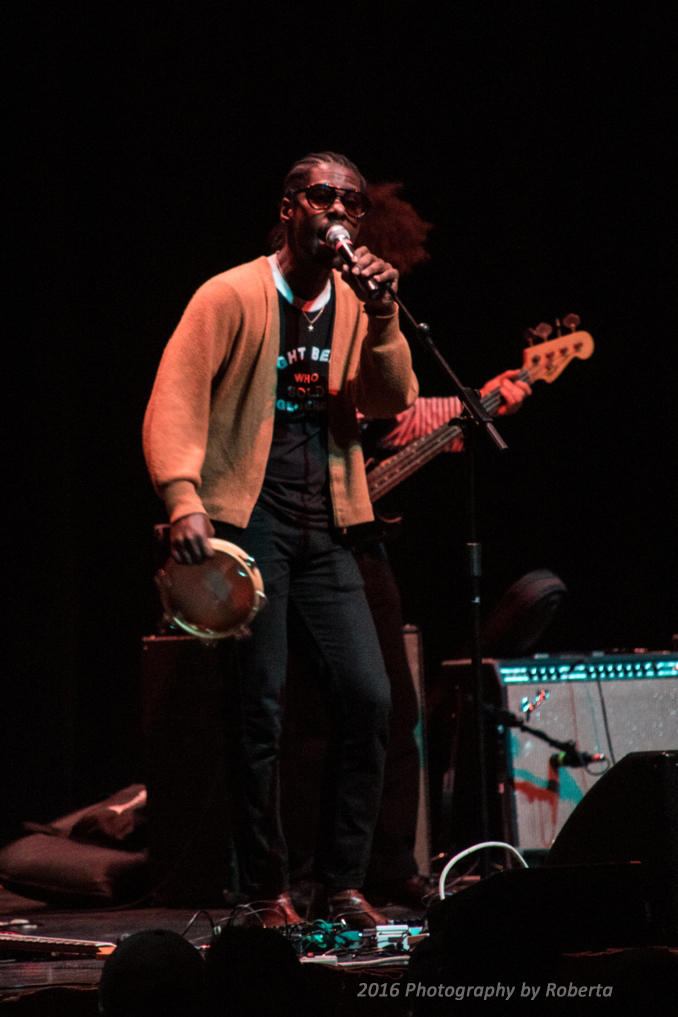
Harding at Adler Theater in 2016

Harding describes his genre as "slop 'n' soul", joining soul music with blues, gospel, psychedelia, R&B, and rock. "Slop" symbolizes Southern culture ("that's what you give to pigs"), and soul represents the music of his youth. "Soul is an experience," Harding told GQ magazine in 2017. "It can be in the way you dress, the way you talk, the way you sit down in a chair. It's a feeling that you can translate to someone with whatever you're doing."

His musical style has elements that are not usually found in soul, like vintage synthesizers sounds and a psychedelic feel. Both of his studio albums include soft strings under his "cooing vocals"; on other songs, his "strong, passionate vocal style" moves into the falsetto range with spirited brass blazing. The Orlando Weekly writes:

Harding's take on soul can be more than a little garage-minded. Live, however, his band’s grooves were lusciously classic, though broadened by some rock kick and psych expansion. Like a great old soul record, the crack quintet were radiant from the jump. With deep guitars, beefy rhythm section and plush keys and sax, this is a unit built for sonorousness. But making it all smolder is Harding’s rich voice, an athletic balance of young vigor and sweet wear. The sum total is a thing of velvet and muscle.

In addition to his mother, Harding has said that his influences include Mahalia Jackson, MC Lyte, Bob Dylan, Albert King, the Everly Brothers, and Ronnie Dyson. In 2015, Michael Hann of The Guardian cited Harding and Leon Bridges as "the new stars of classic soul" with other modern recording artists having brought the genre back into mainstream culture. Harding believes that soul's popularity is simply cyclical, and that its resurgence is "just the way people are."

== Discography ==
=== Studio albums ===
List of studio albums, with selected chart positions
Title	Album details	Peak chart positions					
Title	Album details	US Heat.	BEL (FL)	BEL (WA)	FRA	NL	SWI
Soul Power	Released: May 6, 2014; Label: Burger Records; Formats: Cassette, LP, CD, digital download	—	156	—	82	43	—
Face Your Fear	Released: October 27, 2017; Label: Anti-; Formats: LP, CD, digital download	21	111	162	79	43	78
If Words Were Flowers	Released: November 5, 2021; Label: Anti-; Formats: LP, digital download	—	46	106	—	28	40
Departures & Arrivals: Adventures of Captain Curt	Released: September 5, 2025; Label: Anti-; Formats: LP, digital download	—	—	—	—	—	—
"—" denotes albums that were released but did not chart.

=== Singles ===
List of singles as lead artist, showing year released and album name
Title	Year	Peak chart positions		Album
Title	Year	MEX	US AAA	Album
"Keep on Shining" "Castaway"	2014	44	—	Soul Power
"Next Time"	2014	—	—	Soul Power
"On and On"	2017	44	40	Face Your Fear
"Wednesday Morning Atonement"	2017	—	—	Face Your Fear
"Need Your Love"	2017	—	39	Face Your Fear
"Go As You Are"	2017	—	—	Face Your Fear
"It's Not Over"	2018	—	—	Non-album single
"Hopeful"	2021	—	—	If Words Were Flowers
"I Won't Let You Down"	2021	—	—	If Words Were Flowers
"Our Love"	2021	—	—	Arcane League of Legends (soundtrack)
"There She Goes"	2025	—	35	Departures & Arrivals: Adventures of Captain Curt
"The Power"	2025	—	35	Departures & Arrivals: Adventures of Captain Curt

=== Music videos ===
List of music videos, showing year released and director
Title	Year	Director
"Next Time"	2014	Hedi Slimane
"Keep On Shining"	2014	Jonny Look
"The Drive"	2016	Taylor Bonin
"Wednesday Morning Atonement"	2017	Sky Shields
"Need Your Love"	2017	Elise Tyler

=== Guest appearances ===
List of non-single guest appearances, with other performing artists, showing year released and album name
Title	Year	Album
"I Can't Love You" (We Invented Cool featuring Curtis Harding)	2012	We Invented Cool
"Too Late" (Guantanamo Baywatch featuring Curtis Harding)	2015	Darling... It's Too Late
"Me, You, And the Planet Too" (The Difference Machine featuring Curtis Harding)	2016	The 4th Side of the Eternal Triangle
"Me, You, And the Planet Too" [Chris Hunt Remix] (The Difference Machine featuring Curtis Harding)	2017	Triangle Schemes
"Surrender" (Rüfüs Du Sol feat. Curtis Harding)	2021	Surrender

== Acting ==
Harding appears in the third season of Sundance TV drama Hap and Leonard, playing infamous blues musician L.C. Soothe. The season was filmed in late September 2017 in Cedartown, Georgia, and began airing March 7, 2018.

Television
Year	Title	Role	Ref.
2018	Hap and Leonard	L.C. Soothe	
