= Together Pangea =

American rock band

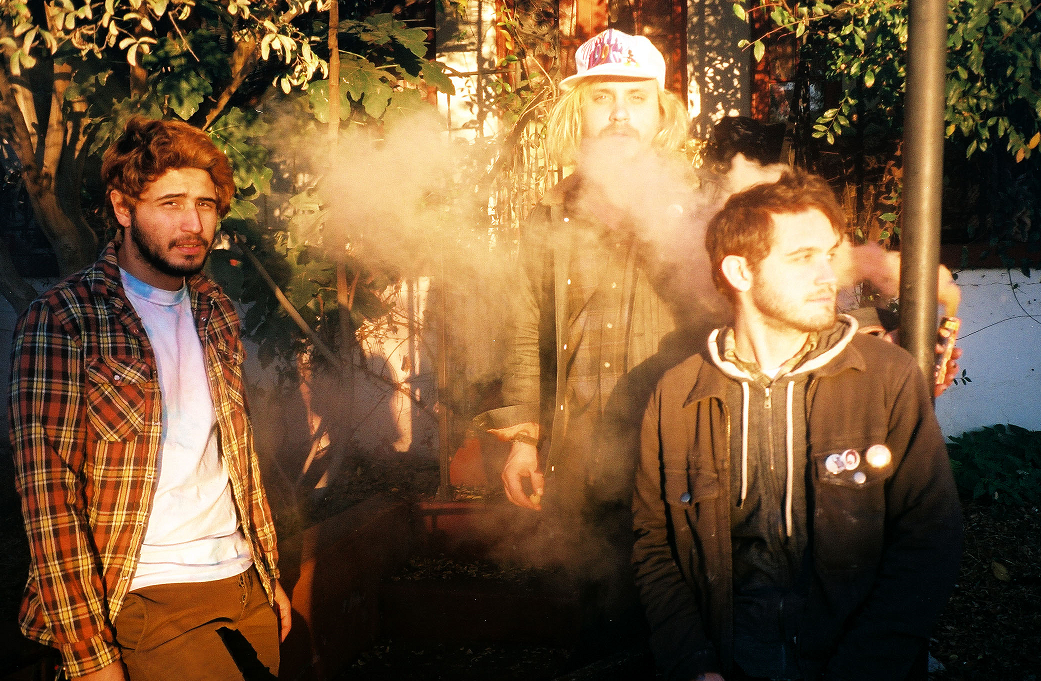

Background information
- Also known as: Pangea
- Origin: Santa Clarita, California
- Genres: Surf rock, Garage punk, alternative rock, garage rock, indie rock
- Years active: 2009–present
- Labels: Nettwerk; Harvest Records; Burger Records; Olfactory Records; Lost Sound Tapes
- Members: William Keegan; Danny Bengston; Erik Jimenez
- Past members: Adrian Tenney; Cory Hanson; Roland Cosio; Patrick Nolan
- Website: togetherpangea.com

Together Pangea (sometimes stylized as together PANGEA) is an American rock band from Santa Clarita, California that is based in Los Angeles, California. The group has released five studio albums and are currently signed to Nettwerk Records.

== History ==
=== 2008–2011: Formation, debut, and Living Dummy ===
Pangea was formed in 2008 when longtime friends William Keegan and Danny Bengston met drummer Erik Jimenez at Cal Arts. The group began playing several shows on the California Institute of the Arts campus and as well as many local venues throughout Southern California, releasing a few singles and EPs in their early days as a band. They eventually released their full-length debut Jelly Jam on cassette in 2010 via Lost Sound Tapes.

Living Dummy, the group's second album, was released in 2011 by the Burger Records label. Following the album's release, they began performing with Ty Segall, Mikal Cronin, Wavves, and The Black Lips. Their first national tour, dubbed the Burgerama Caravan of Stars, saw them share the stage with Gap Dream, Cosmonauts, The Resonars, and Curtis Harding.

=== 2012–2015: Badillac ===
Following the release of Killer Dreams in 2012, Pangea signed to Harvest Records and changed their name to Together Pangea due to legal concerns.

In 2014, Together Pangea released their third album. Titled Badillac, MTV called it one of the most anticipated indie releases of the year. The band set out on a national tour with Mozes and The Firstborn following the album release. Kicking off 2015 with a European tour throughout February and March, the next month saw the band support The Replacements at the Hollywood Palladium in Los Angeles as part of their Back by Unpopular Demand tour. Later that year also saw the release of the six-track EP, The Phage on October 16, produced by Tommy Stinson.

=== 2016–2019: Bulls and Roosters and stylistic change ===
Together Pangea took a short break after the Badillac tour as Bengston spent time in rehab for substance abuse. “It didn't seep in until afterward that it was a career and people were paying money to see us,” Bengston stated in an interview. "In every aspect of the band now, we know this is our lives and we are more grown-up about it. It’s a lot less juvenile than it used to be.”

In 2017, the band released their fourth album, Bulls and Roosters through Nettwerk Records. The album had a noticeably different sound compared to the band's previous releases. When asked in an interview, Keegan explained the shift, citing their song “Blue Mirror” from The Phage, where they put more of their focus on songwriting. Bengston elaborated on the statement, saying that "Badillac was us writing punk songs and playing them live. Now it’s more less-is-more on the guitar end, more tasteful kind of stuff."

The trio continued to experiment in the following years, releasing an acoustic EP titled Sleeping Til Sunset, and two companion EPs, named Non Stop Paranoia and Dispassionate respectively.

=== 2020–present ===
In 2021, Together Pangea released "Marijuana" and "Nothing to Hide", as previews to their fifth album DYE, which was released on October 22 by Nettwerk Records. According to Keegan, shutdowns during the COVID-19 pandemic allowed them to rehearse more than usual, saying that they "did it like a 9–5." The band released a second acoustic EP featuring songs from Dye in 2023, titled Pt. 2.

In 2024, the band announced a deluxe release of the Badillac on Instagram before going on tour to celebrate its ten-year anniversary.

== Discography ==
=== Albums ===
Title	Album details		
Magic, Magic	Released: 2007; Label: Griznar Music Collective Recordings		—
Jelly Jam	Released: July 24, 2010; Label: Lost Sound Tapes; Formats: Cassette, Limited Edition, Digital	—	
Living Dummy	Released: August 30, 2011; Label: Burger Records, olFactory Records; Formats: Vinyl, LP, Limited Edition, Digital		
Badillac	Released: January 21, 2014; Label: Harvest Records; Formats: Vinyl, LP, Gatefold, Digital		
Bulls and Roosters	Released: August 25, 2017; Label: Nettwerk Records; Formats: Vinyl, CD, Digital	—	
DYE	Released: October 22, 2021; Label: Nettwerk Records; Formats: Vinyl, CD, Digital	—	
Eat Myself	Released: January 16, 2026; Label: Nettwerk Records; Formats: Vinyl, CD, Digital	—	

=== Extended plays ===
Title	Album details	Peak chart positions
Pangea/Harvest Moon Society	Released: 2009; Label: Stress Domain; Formats: Vinyl, Split: EP, Digital	
Never not Know Nothing	Released: 2010; Label: Stress Domain; Formats: Vinyl, EP, Digital	
Killer Dreams	Released: 2012; Label: Lauren Records, Ghostbot Records; Formats: Vinyl, EP, Digital	
The Phage	Released: 2015; Label: Burger Records; Formats: Vinyl, CD, Cassette, Digital	
Non Stop Paranoia	Released: 2018; Label: Nettwerk Records; Formats: Vinyl, EP, Digital	
Dispassionate	Released: 2019; Label: Nettwerk Records; Formats: Vinyl, EP, Digital	
She Dont Play Nice	Released: 2020; Label: Nettwerk Records; Formats: Digital	
Pt. 2	Released: 2023; Label: Nettwerk Records; Formats: Vinyl, EP, Digital	
