= The Exbats =

American garage rock band from Arizona

- Origin: Bisbee, Arizona, United States
- Genres: Garage rock, power pop, punk rock, twee pop, psychedelic pop, indie rock, alternative rock
- Years active: 2009–present
- Labels: Goner, Burger
- Members: Inez McLain; Kenny McLain; Bobby Carlson

The Exbats are an American garage rock band from Bisbee, Arizona, consisting of a father–daughter duo, Inez McLain (drums, vocals) and Kenny McLain (guitars, vocals), alongside bassist Bobby Carlson.

== History ==
The Exbats began as a musical collaboration between Kenny McLain and his daughter Inez McLain, who started playing music together when Inez was ten years old. Kenny McLain, who had taken up guitar in his forties, encouraged his daughter to learn drums, leading to the formation of a family band.

The duo initially performed and recorded under the name Numbats. They later adopted the name The Exbats, a term referring to former battery hens, after discovering another Arizona band using a similar name. In 2016 they released their debut album, A Guide to the Health Issues Affecting Rescue Hens, produced by Matt Rendon at Midtown Island Studio in Tucson.

By the late 2010s, the band had expanded into a trio with the addition of bassist Bobby Carlson.

In March 2020, The Exbats released Kicks, Hits and Fits through Burger Records.

Following the cancellation of South by Southwest in 2020 and the subsequent closure of Burger Records, the band recorded new material at Midtown Island Studio in Tucson. In 2021, they signed with Memphis-based label Goner Records and announced the album Now Where Were We, which was released later that year.

The band released Song Machine in 2023, also through Goner Records.

== Discography ==
=== Studio albums ===
- A Guide to the Health Issues Affecting Rescue Hens (2016)
- I Got the Hots for Charlie Watts (2018)
- Kicks, Hits and Fits (2020)
- Now Where Were We (2021)
- Song Machine (2023)

=== Compilation albums ===
- E Is for Exbats (2019)
