= Jaill =

American indie rock band

- Origin: Milwaukee, Wisconsin
- Genres: Indie rock, indie pop
- Years active: 2002–present
- Labels: Sub Pop, Burger, Decorated
- Members: Vincent Kircher; Austin Dutmer; Andrew Harris; Johnathon Mayer
- Past members: Neil Weingarth; Noah Johnson; Clifford Smith; Ryan Adams; Hugh Masterson; Joseph Deluxe

Jaill is an indie rock band formed in Milwaukee, Wisconsin, in 2002. The band consists of Vincent Kircher, Austin Dutmer, and Andrew Harris. Their music is described as psych-pop, with up-beat guitar and punk music matched with dark lyrics. Their 2010 album, That's How We Burn, earned them the most attention, receiving multiple reviews.

== History ==
Vincent Kircher and Austin Dutmer began performing together while in college in Milwaukee, attending Marquette University and University of Wisconsin–Milwaukee respectively. They met through mutual friend Michael Corcoran and soon the three had started playing regionally as The Detectives. Opting to focus more on recording and writing than on playing live shows, Vincent and Austin took to the basement studio in Austin's Milwaukee rental unit, recorded the initial 7-inch EP Semaine De Quatre Jeudis and reformed as Jail. Months later in an effort to begin performing again live, the two added guitar players, bass and keyboards via a rotating cast of other local musicians including Neil Weingarth, Hugh Masterson, later of The Wildbirds, Clifford Smith and Noah Johnson.

=== Early Recordings and Personnel ===
In 2003 Kircher and Dutmer, along with guitarist Hugh Masterson and bassist Neil Weingarth recorded the Decor EP in a spare bedroom of Kircher's house. The instruments were tracked separately, most often without anyone else in the band present at the time of recording. It was released as a show-only CD-R, the band later joking that they pressed "really only a couple dozen, given away for free." But the recording would mark the first time Kircher began experimenting with the limits of the multitrack process. In 2004 they recorded Kept Me Spitting in much the same fashion, with Dutmer and Weingarth laying down the initial song structure, and Kircher filling out most of the rest of the instrumentation himself. It was pressed later that year on Dutmer's Decorated Records imprint, and the band began to make small east coast tours in support.

5 Song was recorded with the intention of making a demo more representational of the group's sound at the time, and was put out by the band as a CD with limited packaging for ease of mailing. It featured newly added members Noah Johnson on guitar, Joseph Deluxe on bass, and Clifford Smith on keyboards. That release also included an early version of Everyone's Hip, a song later rerecorded and used as an advance single on their 2010 Sup Pop release That's How We Burn. 5 Song was recorded in two afternoons, with most of the instruments live-tracked, and all musicians standing in the same small bedroom, using bath towels wrapped around their heads to hold the headphones in place and silence the rest of the unwanted mix.

Prolific and restless, Kircher in 2003 started recording a series of songs covering all of the instrumentation himself, eventually to be released as 2 handmade EPs, a project dubbed, Whimsy and the Slugs. Whimsy and the Slugs (2003) and Cranes (2004) featured some songs eventually featured on Jail albums, and showcased Kircher's range as a songwriter and lo-fi producer. At about the same time Dutmer began splitting his time in Jail with the newly formed Milwaukee folk-garage outfit Goodnight Loving for which he played drums. It was in Goodnight Loving that he met eventual Jaill bassist Andrew Harris, who joined in 2006 following the release of the 5 Song EP.

=== There's No Sky (Oh My My) ===
It was the lineup of Kircher, Dutmer, Harris, Johnson who, with the intention of at long last producing an LP, recorded There's No Sky (Oh My My) in 2008. This time the group took to their practice space in the basement of Milwaukee artist space, The Borg Ward. A former funeral home in Milwaukee's lower west side, the space still retained a body cooler in the basement where the band practiced. The four recorded the basic tracks to There's No Sky live, over a weeks time. Kircher then spent the following 6 months adding and overdubbing guitars, keys, vocals and effects, creating a lo-fi but lush sound. It was pressed on 12-inch vinyl with blank jackets, the cover art a black and white xerox rubber cemented on. It was the album that eventually caught the ear of Sub Pop Records' A&R after it received numerous small mentions and favorable reaction on music blogs. It has subsequently been rereleased on vinyl and cassette by Fullerton, CA based label, Burger Records.

=== Signing To Sub Pop Records ===
In 2009, the band signed to Sub Pop Records, propelling them out of the local music scene and onto the national stage. With the departure of Johnson, the band added Ryan Adams, who had contributed a slide guitar track to There's No Sky (Oh My My), to fulfill touring obligations as a four piece. Adams continued on in the band through the recording of That's How We Burn, eventually departing following the album's release owing to creative differences within the band. One caveat of working with Sub Pop was that the band change their name owing to the existence of a European band of the same name nearly 40 years prior. They opted to add an additional "L" to their name, and their decision to do so was taken as a snide response to having to change their name over something so irrelevant. That's How We Burn was recorded over a month with Justin Perkins at his Mystery Room Recording Studio in Milwaukee. Perkins had previously worked with the band, contributing the final mix and master to There's No Sky (Oh My My). That's How We Burn was their most successful album, and the band toured North America and Europe in support.

== Discography ==
=== Studio albums ===
- There's No Sky (Oh My My) (2009)
- That's How We Burn (2010)
- Traps (2012)
- Brain Cream (2015)
- Wherever It Be (2016)

=== EPs ===
- Semaine De Quatre Jeudis (2002)
- Decor (2003)
- Kept Me Spitting (2005)
- 5 Song (2006)

=== Singles ===
- Pardono b/w Always Wrong (2009)

=== Cassettes ===
- Cranes (2013)
