= Burger Records =

American independent record label

- Founded: 2007; 19 years ago
- Founder: Sean Bohrman, Lee Rickard
- Defunct: July 22, 2020; 5 years ago
- Genre: Rock, punk rock, garage rock, power pop
- Country of origin: U.S.
- Location: Fullerton, California
- Official website: www.burgerrecords.com at the Wayback Machine (archived July 24, 2020) (now redirects to store.fulfillmentmerch.com)

Burger Records was an American independent record label and record store in Fullerton, California, United States. The label was founded in 2007 by Sean Bohrman and Lee Rickard, members of the power pop band Thee Makeout Party. The record/video store, co-owned by Bohrman and Brian Flores, was opened in 2009. The label ceased operations in July 2020, following sexual assault allegations leveled at many of their artists and staff members.

The label was notable for releasing most of its material on cassette. Among the hundreds of artists released on the label were The Brian Jonestown Massacre, Devon Williams, Hunx and His Punx, Bell Gardens, Enjoy, and The Go. According to OC Weekly, the label was known for "its growing catalog of sugary, eccentric power pop and audacious garage rock, extolling a carefree message of love, music and DIY attitude."

== History ==
=== Founding ===
Founders Sean Bohrman and Lee Rickard became friends in the late 1990s while attending high school in Anaheim, California. Avid rock and pop fans, they began collaborating on zines and newsletters, and subsequently started playing in bands together. The duo started out playing in a band called The Noise, "a song-less, almost-music-less band" for which they were dubbed "punk pranksters". Afterwards, they started the power pop band Thee Makeout Party.

At some point, Bohrman and Rickard began putting the Burger logo, which had resulted from Rickard drawing pictures while bored at work, on all of their artistic endeavors. They soon befriended the young lo-fi Fullerton punk band Audacity, joining them on a cross-country tour. Bohrman also earned a Bachelor of Arts degree in journalism from Humboldt State in 2004.

Bohrman and Rickard self-released several 7-inch vinyl records for Thee Makeout Party in 2006, using the name Burger Productions. The label itself was started in 2007, releasing both material from Thee Makeout Party and an LP for Audacity.

According to Bohrman, after getting hold of a cassette tape by another band while on tour, he decided to try cassettes as a practical way to release music. While in a parking lot in Kansas, Bohrman and Rickard emailed bands they'd befriended and asked if they'd like to release old or new material on the label. Bands such as The Go and Nobunny agreed, while labels like Vice and Sub Pop were supportive of rereleases on Burger, as cassette was a format they had no interest in. The label began to primarily release $6 cassettes, occasionally pressing vinyl and on rare occasions releasing CDs. From the beginning, Burger never signed bands, instead allowing artists to retain complete control of the music they released.

=== Use of cassettes ===
Beyond Audacity and Thee Makeout Party, releases by The Go, Traditional Fools, and Apache helped cement the label. The cassette trend first spiked when they released NoBunny's Raw Romance, which sold 500 copies in a week and a half. A later Ryan Adams tape sold all 400 copies within three hours. By August 2012, the label had sold over 100,000 cassettes.

=== Record store ===
In 2009, Bohrman was working as an art director for a boating magazine, only to quit when his job wouldn't allow him to go on tour with Thee Makeout Party. When he returned, he cashed his 401K from his old job and opened a record store. Helping him was Brian Flores, owner of the now defunct record store Third Eye Records. Flores had helped put out the first Burger release.

They chose an emporium on an industrial edge of Fullerton, one that the Los Angeles Times has since called "kind of a post-apocalyptic Apple Store: on-point in its branding message and a hoarder's paradise of music-fan ephemera." Beyond cassettes and vinyl, the store periodically sells the work of comic artists, animators, and other artists.

Since late 2011, they've also released weekly video episodes on YouTube chronicling events in the record store Called "Burger TV" (BRGRTV). The Los Angeles Times has called the series a "charming nonsensical teen-noir.

=== Final years and controversy ===
By August 2012, the label had well over 300 releases in its discography, which has since grown to over 500. By March 2013, the label had signed a distribution deal with Red Eye Distribution, and that May announced that they were also releasing material digitally, on both iTunes and eMusic.

As of 2018, Burger Records had released over 1200 unique titles making it one of the fastest growing independent record labels of all time.

In July 2020, the label faced allegations of normalizing a culture of sexual assault at its shows and within its catalog of artists. Members of SWMRS, Black Lips, The Growlers, The Buttertones, Part Time, Mystic Braves, Cosmonauts, and other groups on the label have been accused of sexual assault, statutory rape, and sexual predation. One such accusation came from Clementine Creevy of Cherry Glazerr, a band which had also put music out on Burger. The label released a statement on July 18, acknowledging a "Zero Tolerance policy" and subsequently responded with a rebrand, separate imprint for female artists, and promises of new leadership. On July 21, label president and co-founder Lee Rickard resigned, and the label announced plans to officially change its name.

On July 22, it was announced that plans to rebrand the label had failed after Jessa Zapor-Gray announced she would not serve as interim label president. As a result, the label announced it would shut down fully. The company began to remove its releases from digital music services. Sean Bohrman confirmed that Burger Records' artists own their music and may choose to re-release their music.

== Style and influence ==
According to the Los Angeles Times, the label focused on "trashy punk with a bubble gum streak," and their business model involved both releasing numerous bands at a low cost and building "an audience that wants to live in your universe. They took '90s DIY culture and gave it a '60s teen-pop makeover."

OC Weekly stated, "The label has developed a reputation in discriminating music circles for its growing catalog of sugary, eccentric power pop and audacious garage rock, extolling a carefree message of love, music and DIY attitude."

Get Bent in 2011 went on to say, "Burger's played a crucial role in the revival of the cassette tape, as well as in the promotion of the thriving Orange County garage scene." In an interview, band The Cosmonauts concurred that "Burger's been responsible for the local tape craze. All Orange County bands either have tapes released by Burger, or have released cassettes themselves."

== Shows ==
In 2009, Total Trash Productions threw the very first Burger Boogaloo at The Knockout in San Francisco, California. The show typically includes John Waters, who has been the host of the show since 2015. The Boogaloo's continued growth has begun to necessitate the use of Mosswood Park in Oakland, California, and has been a host to notable acts such as Iggy Pop, Buzzcocks, X, The Mummies, Flamin' Groovies, Thee Oh Sees, Nobunny, Shannon and the Clams, and many more.

In 2012 the label held the first Burgerama, an all-age annual festival including but not limited to rock, punk, and pop musicians, most of whom have released music on Burger. Burger shows are often done in tandem with Gnar Tapes.

In early 2013 the label began an international promotion campaign for bands all around the world called the Burger Revolution. In March 2013, simultaneous Burger-themed shows were held in Paris, Stockholm, Milan, Melbourne and Tel Aviv, and the campaign culminated with the second Burgerama. The two-day festival included artists such as Ariel Pink, Pharcyde, Black Lips, and The Spits. It sold out both nights, selling more than 1,000 tickets at the Orange County rock club, Santa Ana's, The Observatory. Also that weekend was Burger Boogaloo in San Francisco. In March 2016, Burger Records and the Observatory celebrated 5 years of working together to bring the artists on their label to the live stages of the Observatory. The week long celebration not only showcased the talent on Burger Records but also brought out historic Orange County musical icons such as Rikk Agnew, shoegaze pioneers like Slowdive and the first live performance on U.S. soil of Crystal Castles with their new lead singer, Edith Frances. Furthermore, Burger has presented a series of "Burger Invasion" shows that have been hosted in numerous places around the globe such as Hamburg & Cologne, in Germany in 2017 and Madrid, Spain in 2018.

In the US, dozens of bands joined the Burger caravan tour, which led to over fifty of those bands playing at SXSW.

Burger also hosted a festival called the Burger A-Go-Go which featured only female-fronted bands such as Best Coast, Dum Dum Girls, and Bleached in 2014 and Cat Power, The Julie Ruin, Glitterbust (featuring Kim Gordon), and Kate Nash in 2015. In 2018, Burger took the A-Go-Go on the road with a West-Coast tour of the United States.

== Artists ==
By November 2012, over 350 bands had released music through Burger in various formats. These included Dave Grohl (of the Foo Fighters) and a collaboration between Thurston Moore (of Sonic Youth) and Beck. By May 2019, a total of 1345 unique titles had been released on Burger. The following is a partial list of notable artists that have been released on the label.

- Audacity
- Bell Gardens
- The Black Lips
- Brian Jonestown Massacre
- Chai
- Cherry Glazerr
- The Cleaners from Venus
- Dead Fucking Last
- Devon Williams
- Dwarves
- The Exbats
- FIDLAR
- Gap Dream
- Glitterbust
- The Go
- The Growlers
- Habibi
- Harlem
- Hunx and His Punx
- JEFF the Brotherhood
- Jaill
- Jonah Ray
- Kikagaku Moyo
- King Kahn
- King Tuff
- L.A. Witch
- La Luz
- La Sera
- The Lovely Bad Things
- Mikal Cronin
- The Muffs
- Mystic Braves
- Nobunny
- OFF!
- Outrageous Cherry
- Together Pangea
- Peach Kelli Pop
- The Pharcyde
- The Plimsouls
- Quilt
- Redd Kross
- Ryan Adams
- Shannon and the Clams
- SWMRS
- Tobin Sprout
- Tenement
- Thee Oh Sees
- Turbonegro
- Ty Segall
- Vaadat Charigim
- Warm Soda
- Witch

== Partial catalog ==
No.	Artist	Title	Format	Year
001	Thee Makeout Party!	2EZ2LUVU	7"	2007
002	Audacity	Power Drowning	LP/CD	2007
003	Thee Makeout Party!	Play Pretend	CASS	2007
004	Audacity	The Anne Frank Tape	CASS	2007
005	Devon Williams	Careerfree	CASS	2007
006	The Resonars	That Evil Drone	LP/CD	2007
007	Traditional Fools	S/T	CASS	2007
008	The Go	Howl on The Haunted Beat	CASS	2007
009	Apache	Boomtown Gems	CASS	2007
010	Stan McMahon	The Stan McMahon Band	CASS	2007
184	Bell Gardens	Hangups Need Company	CASS	2012
234	Early Dolphin	Return To Whale Island	CASS	2012
394	Various (Mark Sultan, The Dirtbombs, etc.)	Daddy Rockin Strong: A Tribute to Nolan Strong & The Diablos	CASS	2010
555	Gap Dream	Shine Your Light	LP/CASS	2013

== Wiener Records ==
Wiener Records
- Parent company: Burger Records
- Founded: 2011
- Status: Defunct

By late 2011, the label had created a subsidiary called Wiener Records. Wiener allows any band to have their tape mastered, pressed, packaged, and promoted through Burger, but without the Burger label. Wiener Records has a diverse array of bands. Solitary Debate released Inert on Wiener Records in 2015. Lint (Joel Vigilante) released Dry on Wiener Records in 2015.

No.	Artist	Title	Format
WINR001	The NOiSE!	Worst Of...	CASS
WINR002	Wax Witches	From Hell	CASS
WINR003	V.A.	The Wiener Dog Comp	2 CASS
WINR004	Gangbang Gordon	I'm Not A Musician	CASS
WINR005	The Bingers	Rhymes With Fingers	CASS
WINR006	My People Pray By Starlight/Yusuke Tsutsumi	S/T Split Release	CASS
WINR007	The Jigsaw Seen	Gifted	CASS
WINR024	Cult Choir	Fantasy 6	CASS
WINR042	Club de Surf	Sonic Death EP	CASS
WINR045	The Roxy Suicide	Glam-Damaged Singles Collection	CASS
WINR062	Solitary Debate	Inert	CASS
WINR087	Lint (Joel Vigilante)	Dry	CASS
WINR174	Cinema Cinema	A Night At The Fights	CASS
???	tomorrow massacre	Tender Index	CASS

== See also ==
- List of record labels
