= Vertigo (Wand album) =

Studio album by Wand
- Released: July 26, 2024
- Genre: Rock
- Length: 39:49
- Label: Drag City
- Producer: Wand

Wand chronology
Spiders in the Rain (2022)	Vertigo (2024)

Singles from Vertigo
- 1. "Smile" Released: May 7, 2024; 2. "JJ" Released: June 17, 2024

Vertigo is the sixth studio album by the American psychedelic rock band Wand, released on July 26, 2024, through Drag City. It is the band's first album to feature bassist Evan Backer following the departures of keyboardist Sofia Arreguin and bassist Lee Landey, returning Wand to a four-piece lineup. The album was written and self-produced by the band, and recorded by guitarist Robbie Cody at his Los Angeles studio. Its eight tracks were assembled from more than 50 hours of recorded improvisation.

Musically, critics have categorized Vertigo as a rock album with elements of psychedelic rock, art pop, noise, indie rock, and post-rock. Reviews noted its use of strings, horns, and woodwind instruments, as well as comparisons to artists including Radiohead, Can, and Talk Talk. Two singles, "Smile" and "JJ", preceded the album's release. Wand promoted the album with tours of North America and Europe, performing new material both before and after its release.

== Background and recording ==
Following the release of Wand's fifth studio album, Laughing Matter (2019), the band undertook extensive touring in support of the album and issued a live album, Spiders in the Rain, in 2022. After the band's lineup functioned as a quintet for their previous two studio albums, Wand returned to a four-member lineup. Keyboardist Sofia Arreguin and founding bassist Lee Landey departed and bassist Evan Backer joined the group in 2022, replacing Landey. Wand's vocalist Cory Hanson also pursued solo projects, releasing two studio albums: Pale Horse Rider (2021) and Western Cum (2023), ranging from "cosmic country" to "glam guitar crunch". These solo efforts were recorded with contributions from Cody and Backer.

Vertigo was recorded entirely at guitarist Robbie Cody's Los Angeles studio, with the band self-producing the album. The band developed the album's eight tracks from more than 50 hours of live improvisations; this improvisational method of songwriting marked a departure from Wand's previous studio efforts. The songs were developed from the improvised material through the editing and rearrangement. Band members also took on different roles, an approach the band's label described as "an intuitive, strangely ego-less approach".

== Musical style ==
=== Overview ===
Ryan Meehan of Pitchfork has categorized Vertigo as a rock recording, with other critics noting its elements of psychedelic rock, art pop, noise, indie rock, and post-rock. Meehan describes Vertigo as a kind of contemporary Western, comparing it to the revisionist films of Monte Hellman and Jim Jarmusch. Multiple critics have noted comparisons between Vertigo and the music of Radiohead, particularly in the mood and vocal delivery of lead singer Cory Hanson, to which he is compared to Thom Yorke. Criics also compared the album to the music of the Dylan Group, Neil Young, Can (specifically their album Tago Mago), and Talk Talk.

Orchestration was incorporated during production, including horns and woodwinds, as bassist Evan Backer arranged the album's wind and string sections. The production continues the post-rock-influenced improvisational style hinted at in their 2022 live album Spiders in the Rain. Hanson's high tenor vocals are featured prominently in the album's arrangement. The album adopts a more restrained approach to songwriting, placing greater emphasis on mood than on expansive climaxes. The band has described this as finding a "new gravitational center". The album also incorporates saturated guitars, motorik rhythms, brass and elements of jazz.

=== Songs ===
"Hangman" features shoegaze-influenced instrumentation and is characterized by the heavy use of reverberation and repetition. The track has a disorienting arrangement, with instruments fading in and out of focus in uneven intervals. "Curtain Call", similarly uses reverberation and repetition and gradually from tremolo-tinged feedback into expansive string arrangements and subtle synthesizer layers. The track serves as an extended coda to "Hangman", maintaining the song's arrangement while incorporating strings, keyboards, and synthezisers. "Mistletoe" is described by Fred Thomas of AllMusic as "one of the more wandering tracks" on the album. With an inharmonious texture, it builds from a progression that shifts from a driving Zamrock-inspired rhythm into a dense mixture of horns and electronic sounds. It was also compared by Mojo's Victoria Segal to if "A Day In The Life" by the Beatles was covered by Radiohead, describing it as a "blissful slide into wild orchestral melodrama". Patrick Gill of PopMatters interpreted the lyrics as reflecting a realization of time lost to introspection and self-absorption.

"Smile" is built around heavy guitar riffs and a sound described as reminiscent of Sonic Youth's Jim O'Rourke period. The song features melancholic lyrics and gradually fades out over a duration of more than six minutes. It has drawn comparisons to the work of Bardo Pond and the Smashing Pumpkins during their Siamese Dream era, and has also been likened by Wenzel to a slower interpretation of Pavement's "Summer Babe". "Lifeboat" presents a hypnotic texture, incorporating ethereal horns, plucked piano tones, and elements reminiscent of 1970s Latin rock and soft rock. Hazelwood noted that "Lifeboat" begins in a gentle drift that mirrors the album's closing track. The arrangement develops gradually, incorporating swirling synthesizers, brass, and reverberant guitars, evoking the sensation, according to Hazelwood, of gentle movement akin to a leaf floating on still water. The track ultimately transitions into a darker folktronica tone, with Wenzel noting a sonic palette that blend characteristics of Santana and Steely Dan.

"High Time" is a seven-minute track that incorporates hooks characteristic of alternative rock. It also incorporates art rock and experimental influences, combining pulsing electronic elements with contrasting calming and unsettling tones.The song features distortion and noise that build toward a climactic section with prominent vocal harmonies and string arrangements. Hazelwood described it as a "towering" and "noisy song", commenting on its use of a wall-of-sound aesthetic reminiscent of Spiritualized. In "Seaweed Head", Gardner described Hanson's vocal performance as simultaneously "weary and at peace", set against quivering string lines and a gently driving rhythm. Wenzel likened the song to Loaded-era the Velvet Underground.

== Release and promotion ==
On May 7, 2024, Wand announced Vertigo and released its first single "Smile". The album cover was seen by Langdon Hickman as a reference to A Moon Shaped Pool by Radiohead or Crack-Up by Fleet Foxes. The single "JJ" was released on June 17. The band previewed material from Vertigo during a pre-release show at the Bowery Ballroom on July 18, and copies of the record were sold at merchandise tables. BrooklynVegan's Bill Pearis described these live renditions as having a more forceful presence than their studio counterparts and omitted the orchestral string arrangements found on the album. Vertigo was released on July 26, 2024, through Drag City. Wand supported the album with a North American tour from July through September 2024, performing in club venues and appearing as an opening act for Red Hot Chili Peppers at stadium shows, followed by a series of United Kingdom and European dates in the fall.

== Critical reception ==
Professional ratings
Aggregate scores
Source	Rating
AnyDecentMusic?	7.6/10
Metacritic	81/100
Review scores
Source	Rating
AllMusic	4/5 stars
Mojo	4/5 stars
Pitchfork	7.3/10
PopMatters	7/10
Spectrum Culture	80%
Spin	B
Uncut	8/10
Under the Radar	8.5/10

Vertigo has received acclaim from critics. At Metacritic, which assigns a weighted average rating out of 100 to reviews from mainstream critics, it received a rating of 81 out of 100 based on nine critic reviews, indicating "universal acclaim".

The resulting album is what PopMatters' Patrick Gill considered it to be a "modest output", with the band deliberately paring down the material to create a more restrained and at times subdued listening experience. Ryan Meehan from Pitchfork portrays Vertigo as elusive and indirect, its songs "excavated" rather than composed. The album, he writes, "is a second debut of sorts", and likens its ambition to Pygmalion or Spirit of Eden—works built from "metamorphic parts". Stereogum staff chose Vertigo as Album of the Week upon its release, with critic Chris DeVille praising the album for its focus on ensemble performance. He noted that the album builds its songs from the "best parts of jam sessions", resulting in "a set of patient yet explosive guitar-powered epics" that affirm Wand's status as "one of underground rock's hidden treasures". Holly Hazelwood of Spectrum Culture said that the recording process resulted in compositions that are "thoughtfully constructed" and "anything but straightforward", highlighting the album's "elusive charms" and its ability to reveal fresh depth with repeat listens.

John Wenzel from Spin wrote that Vertigo "offers a lot of what makes Wand a moody delight", noting that the band "meanders with curiosity" and that "what's there is lovingly, potently rendered". Under the Radar journalist Danile Gardner said that Vertigo is "alive with mysterious alchemy and limitless invention", highlighting its "strange beauty" and the band's ability to create a sense of "constant discovery". Bill Pearis of BrooklynVegan called the music on Vertigo unlike the band's previous releases, being their "most expansive, subtle and varied record yet and a bit of a swerve from 2019's flashy knockout Laughing Matter". Peter Watts wrote for Uncut that the songs still reflect their freestyle roots, making Vertigo the band's "most exploratory album". Writing for Mojo, Victoria Segal praises Vertigo as a bold continuation of Wand's willingness to venture into unstable, experimental sonic territory. AllMusic's Fred Thomas says that Vertigo strikes a steady balance between catharsis and ambience, unfolding as a "quietly adventurous album" that "never feels like it's pushing too hard in any one direction", even as it shifts from "blown amplifiers" to "bubbly flutes". According to Langdon Hickman from Treble, the arrangements are considered "sophisticated", and there was an aim to make things feel "cinematic".

== Track listing ==
All tracks were written by Wand.

Side one
No.	Title	Length
1.	"Hangman"	5:34
2.	"Curtain Call"	3:29
3.	"Mistletoe"	5:08
4.	"JJ"	4:06

Side two
No.	Title	Length
5.	"Smile"	6:29
6.	"Lifeboat"	4:30
7.	"High Time"	7:02
8.	"Seaweed Head"	3:31
Total length:		39:49

== Personnel ==
Credits are adapted from the album's liner notes.

Wand

- Cory Hanson – vocals, electric guitar, acoustic guitar, piano, bass, synthesizer, mixing
- Robert Cody – electric guitar, recording, mixing
- Evan Backer – bass, electric guitar, arrangement, mixing
- Evan Burrows – drums, percussion, synthesizer, mixing

Additional personnel

- Heba Kadry – audio mastering
- Evan Frankfurt – mixing
- John Divola – artwork
- Heather Lockie – viola
- Emily Elkin – cello
- Eric Clark – violin
- David Tranchina – contrabass
- Barry Johnson – flute
- Louis Lopez – trumpet
- Tawnee Lillo – French horn
- Harrison Kirk – trombone
- William Roper – tuba
- Ryan Parrish – baritone saxophone
- Max Jaffe – sensory percussion

== Charts ==
Chart performance for Vertigo
Chart (2024)	Peak position
UK Album Downloads (Official Charts)	91
UK Independent Albums (Official Charts)	50

== See also ==
- 2024 in American music
- 2024 in rock music
