= II (Fuzz album) =

Studio album by Fuzz
- Released: October 23, 2015
- Genres: Heavy metal, hard rock
- Length: 67:21
- Label: In the Red

Fuzz chronology
Fuzz (2013)	II (2015)	III (2020)

Professional ratings
Aggregate scores
Source	Rating
Metacritic	79/100
Review scores
Source	Rating
AllMusic	3.5/5 stars
The Austin Chronicle	3.5/5 stars
Consequence of Sound	B
Exclaim!	8/10
The Guardian	4/5 stars
NOW Magazine	4/5 stars
Paste	7/10
Pitchfork	6.7/10
Tiny Mix Tapes	3/5 stars

II is the second studio album by American rock band Fuzz, released on October 23, 2015, on In the Red Records. The album is the first to feature bass guitarist and vocalist Chad Ubovich.

== Background and recording ==
Regarding the writing process for II, bass guitarist Chad Ubovich noted that it was a more collaborative process than the band members were used to: “We all kind of did something we’ve never done before, which was write together as a band. That was a first for all of us. Usually in our respective projects it’s all about writing on our own, and that process. This time we tried something definitely new."

== Track listing ==
No.	Title	Length
1.	"Time Collapse II/The 7th Terror"	7:06
2.	"Rat Race"	2:45
3.	"Let It Live"	5:20
4.	"Pollinate"	3:45
5.	"Bringer of Light"	4:41
6.	"Pipe"	3:20
7.	"Say Hello"	4:49
8.	"Burning Wreath"	4:48
9.	"Red Flag"	1:48
10.	"Jack the Maggot"	4:09
11.	"New Flesh"	2:31
12.	"Sleestak"	2:34
13.	"Silent Sits the Dust Bowl"	5:58
14.	"II"	13:48
