= Fuzz (Fuzz album) =

Studio album by Fuzz
- Released: October 1, 2013
- Recorded: 2012–2013
- Genres: Heavy metal, hard rock, acid rock, psychedelic rock
- Length: 36:23
- Label: In the Red

Fuzz chronology
Fuzz (2013)	II (2015)

Professional ratings
Aggregate scores
Source	Rating
Metacritic	79/100
Review scores
Source	Rating
AllMusic	3.5/5 stars
Beats Per Minute	78%
Blurt	4/5 stars
Consequence of Sound	C+
Filter	86%
Paste	8.1/10
Pitchfork	7.3/10
PopMatters	7/10 stars

Fuzz is the debut studio album by native Californian band Fuzz released on October 1, 2013, by In the Red Records. The album features a traditional heavy metal and hard rock sound in the vein of Blue Cheer, High Tide, Black Sabbath, and Deep Purple

== Track listing ==
No.	Title	Length
1.	"Earthen Gate"	5:01
2.	"Sleigh Ride"	3:12
3.	"What's In My Head?"	3:55
4.	"HazeMaze"	5:50
5.	"Loose Sutures"	6:13
6.	"Preacher"	2:21
7.	"Raise"	3:43
8.	"One"	6:06

== Personnel ==
- Roland Cosio - bass, harmony on "What's in My Head"
- Ty Segall - drums / lead vocals
- Charles Moothart - guitar, main vocals on "Raise"
- Recording, mixing & wizardry : Chris Woodhouse, May 25–31, 2013 @ The Dock, Sacramento, CA.
- Cover Art by Tatiana Kartomten
- Photos by Denee Petracek
