= III (Fuzz album) =

Studio album by Fuzz
- Released: October 23, 2020
- Studio: United Recording
- Genre: Heavy metal, hard rock
- Length: 36:02
- Label: In the Red
- Producer: Steve Albini

Fuzz chronology
II (2015)	III (2020)

Professional ratings
Review scores
Source	Rating
AllMusic	4/5 stars
Pitchfork	7.5/10
Exclaim!	8/10
Under the Radar	7/10

III is the third studio album by American rock band Fuzz, released on October 23, 2020, on In the Red Records. The album was produced by Steve Albini. The first single from the album, "Returning", was released on July 22, 2020.

== Track listing ==
No.	Title	Length
1.	"Returning"	3:00
2.	"Nothing People"	3:28
3.	"Spit"	2:44
4.	"Time Collapse"	6:12
5.	"Mirror"	2:55
6.	"Close Your Eyes"	4:41
7.	"Blind to Vines"	5:12
8.	"End Returning"	7:45
Total length:		36:02
