= 1000 Days =

Studio album by Wand
- Released: September 25, 2015
- Studios: Cut Rate Studios (Los Angeles, CA); Bauer Mansion (San Francisco, CA)
- Genre: Psychedelic rock
- Length: 33:05
- Label: Drag City

Wand chronology
Golem (2015)	1000 Days (2015)	Plum (2017)

1000 Days is the third studio album by American band Wand. It was released on September 25, 2015, via Drag City Records. Recording sessions took place at Cut Rate Studios in Los Angeles and at Bauer Mansion in San Francisco. It features contributions from Caleb Steinmeyer.

== Critical reception ==
Professional ratings
Aggregate scores
Source	Rating
AnyDecentMusic?	7/10
Metacritic	76/100
Review scores
Source	Rating
The 405	8.5/10
AllMusic	4/5 stars
Consequence of Sound	C
Exclaim!	6/10
God Is in the TV	4/5
The Line of Best Fit	7.5/10
MusicOMH	3.5/5 stars
Pitchfork	7/10
PopMatters	7/10
Under the Radar	7/10 stars

1000 Days was met with generally favorable reviews from music critics. At Metacritic, which assigns a normalized rating out of 100 to reviews from mainstream publications, the album received an average score of 76 based on fifteen reviews. The aggregator AnyDecentMusic? has the critical consensus of the album at a 7 out of 10, based on twelve reviews.

James Canham of The 405 praised the album, concluding "this feels like a band overflowing with ideas in a productive way". AllMusic's Tim Sendra claimed: "they may be one of many, many neo-psych bands out there in 2015 whipping up retro-flavored noise, but this record proves that they are one of the best and most imaginative". Loz Etheridge of God Is in the TV called it "an album best experienced on the open road with the sound cranked up to the max". Jessica Goodman of The Line of Best Fit stated: "removed from the expansive instrument-led sounds of previous records Ganglion Reef and Golem, 1000 Days immerses inwards. Strident stadium rock collides with characteristic psychedelia with a natural euphoria". Sam Shepherd of musicOMH wrote: "a few mis-steps aside, this is yet another strong showing from a band in the midst of a creative whirlwind, one that fortunately shows little signs of blowing itself out". JJ Skolnik of Pitchfork called the album "a heartening record, a record that sees a young band picking up steam, playing with their influences more deftly than on their prior LPs, and bringing a thoughtful approach to old and well-traveled sounds". Andrew Crowley of PopMatters found the album "a fine effort by Wand and well worth seeking out for those with a taste for garage rock not yet sated by releases this year from Mikal Cronin, Warm Soda and Thee Oh Sees". Paul Bullock of Under the Radar wrote: "1000 Days swings wildly from Black Sabbath-style paranoia to delicate Van Dyke Parks weirdness with an increasingly erudite command of garage rock while still managing to maintain much of the enigmatic charm of their previous releases".

In mixed reviews, Yasmine Shemesh of Exclaim! wrote: "though the triumph of 1000 Days is its fusion of light and dark, there are some moments that feel out of place: the murky noise on instrumental "Dovetail" is a bit harrowing against the gentle acoustics on the title track, while "Little Dream", a 38-second spurt of woozy punk, appears and disappears out of nowhere". Jon Hadusek of Consequence found the album "sounds like a Cory Hanson solo album and a stagnant development for Wand, who, instead of progressing toward a heavy psych sound patently their own, settle for a gentler, safer pop record".

== Track listing ==
No.	Title	Length
1.	"Grave Robber"	3:33
2.	"Broken Sun"	2:44
3.	"Paintings Are Dead"	1:46
4.	"Dungeon Dropper"	2:14
5.	"Dovetail"	4:06
6.	"1000 Days"	2:43
7.	"Lower Order"	3:39
8.	"Sleepy Dog"	2:37
9.	"Stolen Footsteps"	2:52
10.	"Passage of the Dream"	3:39
11.	"Little Dream"	0:37
12.	"Morning Rainbow"	2:35
Total length:		33:05
