= Wallpaper Music =

Studio album by Cheap Time
- Released: May 1, 2012
- Genre: Garage rock
- Length: 39:33
- Label: In the Red Records

Cheap Time chronology
Two and a Half Times Around (2010)	Wallpaper Music (2012)	Exit Smiles (2013)

Professional ratings
Review scores
Source	Rating
AllMusic	3.5/5 stars
Blurt	(7/10)
Consequence of Sound	2.5/5 stars
PopMatters	(5/10)

Wallpaper Music is the fourth studio album by the Nashville-based band Cheap Time. The single "Another Time", released in 2011, appears on the album. In the Red Records released the album in 2012. The catalog number is ITR-223.

== Track listing ==
1. "More Cigarettes" – 3:58
2. "Straight and Narrow" – 2:18
3. "Hall of Mirrors" – 3:42
4. "Another Time" – 2:30
5. "Take It If You Want It" – 3:34
6. "Dream it Up" – 4:16
7. "Night to Night" – 3:55
8. "Witches in Stock" – 3:27
9. "Typically Strange" – 4:25
10. "Underneath the Fruit Flies" – 7:28

== Personnel ==
- Jeffery Novak – guitar, vocals
- Ryan Sweeney – drums
- Cole Kinnear – bass guitar, vocals
