= King Brothers =

King Brothers may refer to:

- King Brothers (bus operator), Australian company
- King Brothers Productions, American film production company

== Music ==
- Dlamini King Brothers, South African choir
- The King Brothers, British pop trio, releases 1957-1967
- The King Brothers (American group), releases 1997-2001
- King Brothers (Japanese group), rock band
