= Sweet '17 Singles =

Compilation album by Twin Peaks
- Released: February 9, 2018
- Studio: Twin Peaks' Studio & Treehouse Studios
- Genre: Rock
- Length: 47:44
- Label: Grand Jury; Fat Possum

Twin Peaks chronology
Urbs in Horto (2017)	Sweet '17 Singles (2018)	Lookout Low (2019)

Twin Peaks studio chronology
Down in Heaven (2016)	Sweet '17 Singles (2018)	Lookout Low (2019)

Sweet '17 Singles is the first compilation album and fifth overall album by American rock band Twin Peaks, released on February 9, 2018 on Grand Jury Music. It consists of 12 songs that were initially released across six 7" vinyl singles starting in July and ending in December, 2017. Each single was limited to 300 copies and sold by subscription. Due to popular demand, Twin Peaks compiled the songs and issued them on vinyl.

== Track listing ==
All tracks are written by Cadien Lake James, Clay Frankel, Colin Croom, Connor Brodner and Jack Dolan.

No.	Title	Lead vocals	Length
1.	"Tossing Tears"	Cadien James	4:11
2.	"Under the Pines"	Clay Frankel	3:53
3.	"Shake Your Lonely"	Frankel	3:36
4.	"Sun and the Trees"	James	3:31
5.	"Come for Me"	Frankel	3:19
6.	"Fat Chance"	James	3:55
7.	"Blue Coupe"	Jack Dolan	3:43
8.	"On the Line"	James	2:14
9.	"With You"	Frankel	4:23
10.	"Just Because"	James	2:41
11.	"In the Meadow"	Colin Croom	5:50
12.	"We Will Not Make It (Not Without You)"	group	6:28
Total length:			47:44

== Personnel ==
Credits adapted from Sweet '17 Singles liner notes.

Twin Peaks

- Connor Brodner – drums
- Colin Croom – lead vocals (11), guitars, keyboards
- Jack Dolan – bass guitar, lead vocals (7)
- Clay Frankel – lead vocals (2, 3, 5, 9), guitars
- Cadien Lake James – lead vocals (1, 4, 6, 8, 10), guitars

Additional musicians

- Kevin Decker – saxophone, flute
- Sima Cunningham – backing vocals (1)
- Marisa Nakamura – backing vocals (3)
- Macie Stewart – backing vocals & violin (1)

Production

- Barrett Guzaldo – engineer
- R. Andrew Humphrey – engineer, mixer
- Alan Silverman – mastering
- Daniel Topete – cover photo
- Twin Peaks – recording

== Charts ==
Chart (2018)	Peak position
US Heatseekers Albums (Billboard)	7
US Independent Albums (Billboard)	25
US Vinyl Albums (Billboard)	11
