= Gary Alesbrook =

British trumpet player (born 1976)

- Born: 1976 (age 49–50); Plymouth, England
- Genres: Jazz, rock, R&B, pop
- Occupations: Trumpet player, session musician
- Years active: 1999–present

Gary Alesbrook (born 1976) is a British trumpet player.

== Early life and education ==
Alesbrook was born in Plymouth and educated at Leeds College of Music.

== Career ==
On leaving college. Alesbrook started his session career in 1999 playing for the Super Furry Animals, touring and playing on the albums Mwng, Rings Around the World, Hey Venus! and Phantom Power. He also played on Gruff Rhys solo album, Hotel Shampoo.

Alesbrook recorded with Kasabian in 2006, playing one track, 'The Doberman,' on their second album Empire. He toured next with the Scissor Sisters on their UK dates and for their live DVD recorded July 2007 at London O2 arena. He then joined Kasabian for recording and touring from 2007 until the present day.

In 2008 Alesbrook recorded on the album Torch with the group INgrooves.

In between Kasabian commitments, Alesbrook also toured with US R&B artist Raphael Saadiq and recorded on albums KT Tunstall, Tiger Suit and Noel Gallagher's High Flying Birds.

He maintains his own band, The Duval Project, who have released an EP mixed by Grammy winning sound engineer Russell Elevado and also released two singles in 2015. Alesbrook has also played on soundtracks for film and TV, including London Boulevard and Guy Ritchie's The Man from U.N.C.L.E.. He also played on soundtracks for The Mighty Boosh.

In 2013, Alesbrook recorded with the Rich O'Brien Project on the album Horizons, and in 2015 he continued to perform with the Super Furry Animals.

In 2015, he performed with pianist Ruth Hammond. In 2016, he was interviewed on BBC about his songwriting and performing with Kasabian, and in 2017 he performed with the Andy Hague Big Band.

In 2019, Alesbrook would appear on American rock band Twin Peaks' fourth studio album Lookout Low, which was recorded at Monnow Valley Studio in Wales.
