= Skip Jensen =

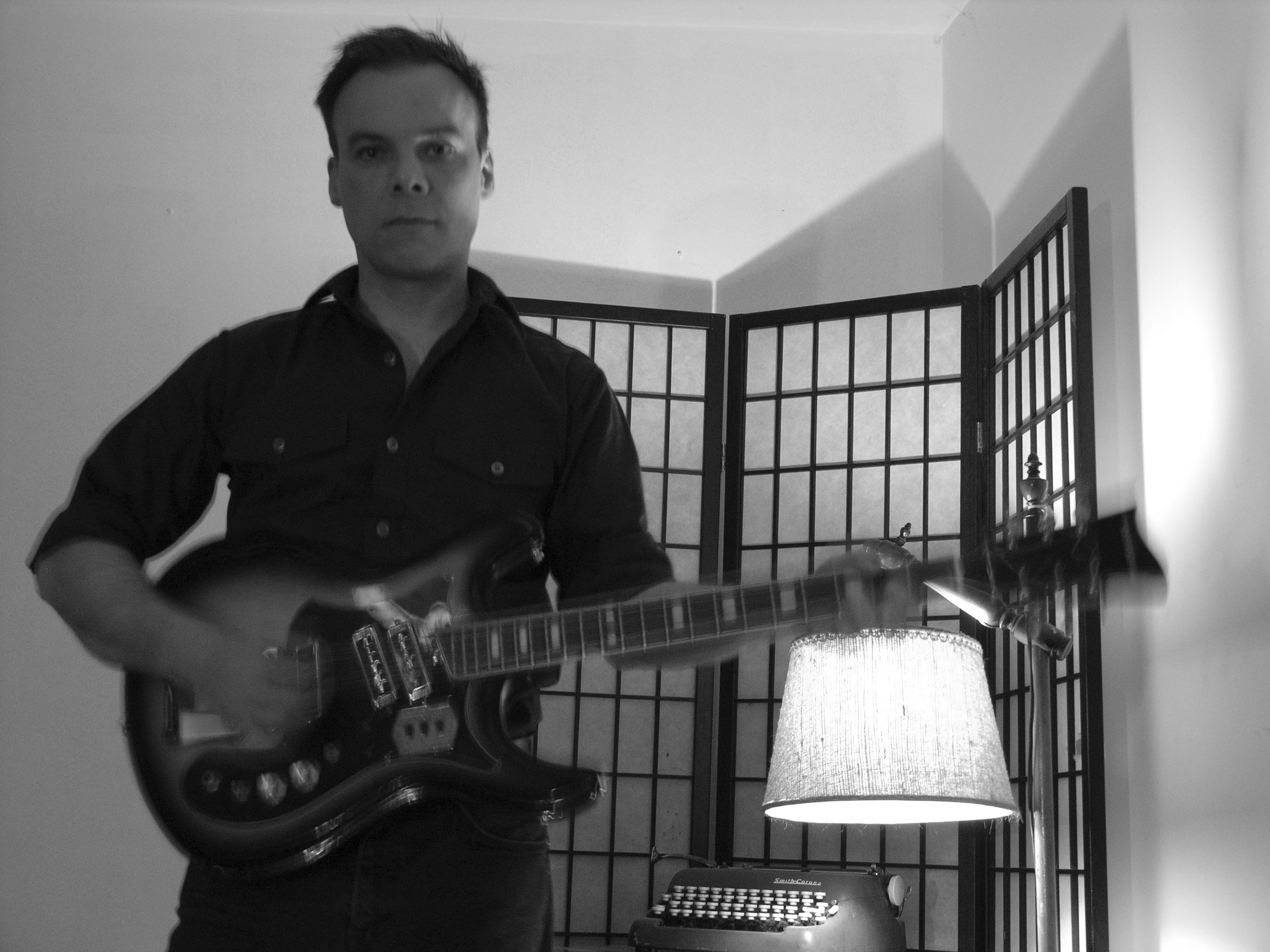

Background information
- Born: Serge Gendron; February 19, 1967 (age 58); Lachine, Quebec, Canada
- Occupation(s): Musician, songwriter, comic artist
- Instrument(s): Vocals, guitar, drums, percussions
- Years active: 1996-present
- Website: www.skipjensen.bandcamp.com

Serge Gendron, (born February 19, 1967), better known by the stage name Skip Jensen, is a Canadian singer-songwriter and cartoonist raised in Lachine, Montreal.

== Career ==
=== Music ===
Jensen began his musical career in 1996 with the group Scat Rag Boosters, which was known for its special brand of rock 'n' roll garage music. The group existed until 2004, releasing a dozen singles, a few songs on different compilations, and one official album. Jensen also played in Stack O'Lees and The Wrong Doers, and from 2004 until 2007 he played drums in Demon's Claws.

In 2000, Jensen began his solo career as a one-man band called Skip Jensen & His Shakin' Feet and released several singles on European labels. His first solo album, Abscond, was published in 2005. His second, The Spirit of the Ghost, came out in 2011. The album was mixed by Orson Presence, former member of The Monochrome Set.

He has toured in Canada, the United States, Europe, and China. His next album will be released in 2013, with Johann Schlager on drums and Shawn Cotton on bass.

=== Comics ===
Jensen started creating comics and illustrations around 2006. He contributed to the comic Justine in 2009. His first cartoon was published in Trip Number 7 in 2012. The comic tells the story of the 1972 Blue Bird Café fire in Montreal.

Jensen is currently working on an autobiographical graphic novel about his childhood in Lachine.

== Discography ==
=== Solo ===
Albums

- Abscond LP, Nitro, Belgium, 2005, NITRO 028
- Abscond CD, Deltapop, USA, 2005, DPM 005
- The Spirit Of The Ghost, Red Lounge Records, Germany, 2011

EPs

- On The Right Side, Yakisakana Records, France, 2003, SAZAE 010
- Evil Weirdos, Yakisakana Records, France, 2003, SAZAE 012
- split/single, Solid Sex Lovie Doll Records, Italy, 2003, SSLD 011
- Mountain, Deltapop, USA, 2004, DPM 002
- Honey Child, Latida Records, Canada, 2006, LTDR 002
- Out On The Horizon, Perpetrators Records, New Zealand, 2007, PERP 19
- Alone & Forsaken, Goodbye Boozy Records, Italy, 2008, GB 39
- All I Want, Bug house Records, USA, 2008, BG-004
- Lonesome Moon, GhostHighway Recordings, Spain, 2010
- Building Down/Evil Weirdos, Stencil Trash Records, Germany, 2014

Compilation appearances

- Attack of the One Man, Bands compilation, Rocknroll Purgatory, USA, 2007, RRP 020
- Compilation du Salon, Musique Indépendante, Montréal, SMIM Records 2007, Canada

=== With Scat Rag Boosters ===
Albums

- Scat Rag Boosters LP, Yakisakana Records, France, 2004, KUJIRA 001
- Scat Rag Boosters CD, Deltapop, USA, 2005, DPM 004

EPs

- Slickat, Flying bomb Records, USA, 2000, FLB-113
- split/single, Goodbye Boozy Records, Italy, 2000, GB 06
- The Violent Climax, Arse’Plot Recordings, France, 2000, SMG 001
- I'm Coming On, Yakisakana Records, France, 2001, SAZAE 004
- I Mean It, Goodbye Boozy Records, Italy, 2002, GB 09
- Sidetracked, Zaxxon Records, Canada, 2002, ZVA 5
- Boogie Man, Kryptonite Records, USA, 2003, KR-008; Savage Records, Sweden 2003, SAV 7006
- Leavin' Town, Solid Sex Lovie Doll Records, Italy, 2003, SSLD 010
- Charlie's Dirtroad, Goodbye Boozy Records, Italy, 2004, GB 16

Compilation appearances

- Nothing Beats A Royal Flush, Roto-Flex Records, Canada, 1997
- Blow The Fuse Pot-Pourri De Quality, Blow The Fuse Records, Canada, 1997, BTFCD 002
- A Harem Of Hits CD, Sultan Records, Canada, 1999, SLTN CD 001
- Greaseball Melodrama, Gearhead Records, États-Unis 2003, RPM 047
- The Sympathetic Sounds Of Montréal CD, Sympathy for the Record Industry, USA, 2005, SFTRI 686

=== With Stack O'Lees ===
EPs

- Change My Plan, Big Black Hole Records, Spain, 2004, Hole 002

Compilation appearances

- The Sympathetic Sounds Of Montréal CD, Sympathy for the Record Industry, USA, 2005, SFTRI 686

=== With Demon's Claws ===
Albums

- Demon's Claws LP, P-Trash Records, Germany, 2005, FULL TRASH 003
- Demon's Claws CD, Dead Canary Records, USA, 2005, DCR 004
- Satan's Little Pet Pig, In The Red Records, USA, 2007, ITR 139

EPs

- Demon's Claws, P-Trash Records, Germany, 2005, P.TRASH 09
- Tomcat, Perpetrators Records, New Zealand, 2005, PERP 6

Compilation appearances

- Gravy Presents Get it! Smash it! Vol 1, USA
- Lost In The Desert, Demos and Outtakes, Telephone Explosion, Canada, 2009, TER010

== Comics and illustrations ==
- Lachine Beach, Éditions Trip, Montréal, 2015 (ISBN 978-1-928087-04-5)
- Lachine Beach, Magazine Trip no8, Éditions Trip, Montréal, 2014 (ISBN 978-1-928087-00-7)
- Blue Bird, Magazine Trip No7, Éditions Trip, Montréal, 2012 (ISBN 978-0-9864712-9-2)
- Out On The Horizon, Perpetrators Records, Nouvelle-Zélande, 2007, PERP 19
- Justine, Iris, La Pastèque, Montréal, 2011 (ISBN 978-2-922585-95-7)
- The Spirit Of The Ghost, Red Lounge Records, Germany, 2011
