= Golem (album) =

Studio album by Wand
- Released: March 17, 2015
- Recorded: 2014
- Studio: The Dock, Sacramento, California, US
- Genre: Hard rock; neo-psychedelia
- Length: 36:30
- Language: English
- Label: In the Red Records
- Producer: Wand; Chris Woodhouse

Wand chronology
Ganglion Reef (2014)	Golem (2015)	1000 Days (2015)

Golem is the second studio album by American neo-psychedelia rock band Wand, released in 2015. The album has received positive reviews from critics.

== Reception ==
Editors at AllMusic rated this album 4 out of 5 stars, with critic Tim Sendra writing that compared debut album Ganglion Reef, "Golem, cuts out anything folky, paves over some of the fragile psych weirdness, and instead piles on the heavy, heavy noise, stomping into protoplasmic Black Sabbath territory at times" and continuing that "even though they have changed up their approach, the guys in Wand didn't lose their ability to craft songs with huge hooks" and recommends to listeners that for "anyone looking for some weird heavy rock noise, Golem fits the bill". Collin Brennan of Consequence of Sound rated Golem a B, stating that "one of the album’s strengths lies in the sense of narrative it conveys", tracing someone awakening from sleep with the shifting moods and tones in the music and he compared this album to the folklore monster golem by stating that it is "a physically imposing being with a touch of magic at its core". Joseph Rowan of Drowned in Sound rated this album 7 out of 10 and compared the psychedelic sounds to Hawkwind, continuing that "while it doesn’t offer anything incredibly new and does wear its influences unashamedly all over its sleeve, it manages to mix these influences up in a very enjoyable way" with "joyful exuberance". NME directed readers to nine albums that they may have missed the week this was released and Rhian Daly gave Golem an 8 out of 10, stating that it "is full of brain-bending riffs, effects and abstract lyrics". Editors at Pitchfork scored this release 7.0 out of 10 and critic Aaron Leitko wrote that it "draws from the old-school prog/psych sourcebook, but the songs often wander away from the script in a way that is refreshing", drawing comparisons to Butthole Surfers and The Melvins.

== Track listing ==
All songs written by Evan Burrows, Cory Hanson, Lee Landey, and Daniel Martens

1. "The Unexplored Map" – 2:29
2. "Self Hypnosis in 3 Days" – 3:48
3. "Reaper Invert" – 3:41
4. "Melted Rope" – 4:11
5. "Cave In" – 4:12
6. "Flesh Tour" – 3:46
7. "Floating Head" – 3:08
8. "Planet Golem" – 6:36
9. "The Drift" – 4:39

== Personnel ==
Wand

- Evan Burrows – drums, production
- Cory Hanson – guitar, vocals, production
- Lee Landey – bass guitar, production
- Daniel Martens – guitar, production

Additional personnel

- Denee Petracek – layout
- Bob Marshall – assistant engineering
- Rueben Sawyer – artwork
- Meghan Tryon – artwork
- Chris Woodhouse – recording, mixing, production

== See also ==
- 2015 in American music
- 2015 in rock music
- List of 2015 albums
