= Lookout Low =

Studio album by Twin Peaks
- Released: September 13, 2019
- Studios: Monnow Valley, Wales
- Genre: Rock
- Length: 42:35
- Labels: Grand Jury; Communion; Inertia; Space 44
- Producer: Ethan Johns

Twin Peaks chronology
Sweet '17 Singles (2018)	Lookout Low (2019)	Side A (2020)

Twin Peaks studio album chronology
Down in Heaven (2016)	Lookout Low (2019)

Singles from Lookout Low
- 1. "Dance Through It" Released: July 17, 2019; 2. "Ferry Song" Released: August 20, 2019; 3. "Oh Mama" Released: September 10, 2019

Lookout Low is the fourth and final studio album by American garage rock band Twin Peaks, released on September 13, 2019 on Grand Jury Music in North America, Inertia and Space 44 in Australia and New Zealand and the rest of the world on Communion.

Professional ratings
Aggregate scores
Source	Rating
Metacritic	70/100
Review scores
Source	Rating
AllMusic	4/5 stars
Chicago Tribune	3/4 stars
Clash	7/10
Exclaim!	9/10
Paste	6.5/10
Pitchfork	5.9/10
Under the Radar	6.5/10

== Background ==
On July 17, 2019, Twin Peaks announced the release of Lookout Low, as well as premiered the first single "Dance Through It", after teasing it on social media. "Ferry Song" was released as the second single on August 20, 2019, and "Oh Mama" was released as the third single on September 10, 2019.

== Outtakes ==
- "Our World" was released as the b-side to "Dance Through It," then digitally released on October 31, 2019.

== Track listing ==
All tracks are written by Cadien Lake James, Clay Frankel, Colin Croom, Connor Brodner and Jack Dolan.

No.	Title	Lead vocals	Length
1.	"Casey's Groove"	Cadien James	4:05
2.	"Laid in Gold"	Colin Croom	3:13
3.	"Better Than Stoned"	Clay Frankel	4:24
4.	"Unfamiliar Sun"	Jack Dolan	4:22
5.	"Dance Through It"	James	4:43
6.	"Lookout Low"	Frankel	3:57
7.	"Ferry Song"	Croom	3:48
8.	"Under a Smile"	Frankel	3:51
9.	"Oh Mama"	Frankel	5:42
10.	"Sunken II"	Dolan	4:30
Total length:			42:35

== Personnel ==
Credits adapted from Lookout Low liner notes.

Twin Peaks

- Connor Brodner – drums (all tracks)
- Colin Croom – lead vocals (2, 7), guitars (1, 2, 3, 6, 8), piano (2, 3, 4, 6, 7), Mellotron (4), Moog Grandmother (5), Wurlitzer (5), pump organ (7), synthesizer (10), horn arrangements (10)
- Jack Dolan – bass guitar (all tracks), lead vocals (4, 10)
- Clay Frankel – lead vocals (3, 6, 8, 9), rhythm guitar (all tracks), "drone" (1)
- Cadien Lake James – lead vocals (1, 5), lead guitar (all tracks), "drone" (1)

Additional musicians

- Gary Alesbrook – trumpet (3, 5, 7, 10)
- Sima Cunningham – vocals (3, 4, 5, 6, 8, 9, 10)
- Kyle Davis – percussion (all tracks), Mellotron (4)
- Ethan Johns – Moog Grandmother (1), mandolin (4)
- Macie Stewart – vocals (3, 4, 5, 6, 8, 9, 10)
- Tom Taylor – saxophone (3, 5, 7, 10)

Production

- Matt Colton – mastering
- Ethan Johns – producer, mixer
- Callum Marinho – assistant engineer
- Dominic Monks – engineer
- Ned Roberts – assistant engineer

Artwork

- Connor Brodner – photography
- Clay Frankel – cover & design
- Cadien Lake James – cover & design

== Charts ==
Chart (2019)	Peak position
Billboard Tastemakers	15
Billboard Heatseekers Albums	8
Billboard Independent Albums	31
Billboard Top Album Sales	85
Billboard Vinyl Albums	16
Billboard Top Current Albums	66
