= Demon's Claws =

Canadian garage rock band

- Origin: Montreal, Quebec, Canada
- Genre: Garage rock
- Years active: 2003–present
- Labels: In the Red; Norton; Rob's House
- Members: Jeff Clarke, Pat Meteor, Ysael Pepin, Piero Ilov, Serge Gendron also known as Skip Jensen, Brian Hildebrand

The Demon's Claws are a Canadian garage rock band from Montreal. They are known for blending a trashy 1960s punk sound with raw folk and country melodies. The band is signed to In the Red Records.

== Biography ==
The Demon's Claws emerged from Montreal's thriving punk underground, playing a gritty mixture of folk-rock, country, and blues. According to AllMusic writer Mark Deming, the band has been compared to the Rolling Stones and the Pretty Things, as well as punk-blues pioneers The Gun Club.

The Demon's Claws was founded in 2003 by Jeff Clarke (aka Lester Del Ray and Rudy Stanko), a former member of The Cut Offs and The Normals. The band was named after a sharply turned piece of track that came with a toy racing car set Clarke owned as a child. Also featuring Pat Meteor on guitar, Ysael Pepin (aka Le Lutin) on bass, and Serge Gendron (aka Skip Jensen) on drums, the Demon's Claws released their first single in 2005 for the German P. Trash label, with a self-titled full-length album appearing on the same imprint later that year.

The New Zealand-based Perpetrator Records issued the band's next single, and in 2006 Serge Gendron left the band, with Brian Hildebrand (B-Man Le Duke) taking over on drums; the same year they also added a keyboard player, Piero Ilov. The band toured Canada frequently and made occasional trips to the United States, where they formed a mutual appreciation society with manic Atlanta garage punks the Black Lips, who took the band on road as an opening act and shared the Norton Records Stones tribute 7" with them. Along with a single for Rob's House Records, the Demon's Claws released their second full-length album in 2007, Satan's Little Pet Pig, which was distributed by the noted garage punk outfit In the Red Records.

In September 2010, the band offered a track for the compilation album Daddy Rockin' Strong: A Tribute to Nolan Strong & the Diablos - they recorded a cover of the 1950s Detroit doo-wop "Try Me One More Time". The Wind Records, along with Norton Records, released the album.

The band released "The Defrosting of..." on In The Red in 2010.

== Discography ==
=== EPs ===
- "Demon's Claw" (7") - P. Trash Records, 2004
- "Fucked On Ketamine" b/w "Always Be My Friend" (7") Rob's House Records, 2008
- "Weird Ways" (7") Rob's House Records, 2009
- "What To Do" (7") Norton Records, 2009

=== Albums ===
- 2005 Demon's Claws (Dead Canary Records / P. Trash Records)
- 2005 Live In Spring Branch, TX (Hook Or Crook Records)
- 2007 Satan's Little Pet Pig (In The Red Recordings)
- 2008 Demon's Claws (re-press Radio 81 Rec. with a different cover)
- 2010 The Defrosting Of... (In The Red Recordings)

=== Tracks appear on ===
- Gonerfest2 (DVD + CD) - Goner Records, 2006
- Our Boy Roy (LP, Album, Compilation, Ltd) - Telephone Explosion Records, 2010
- Killed By Trash (Compilation)
- Daddy Rockin Strong: A Tribute to Nolan Strong & The Diablos (LP) - The Wind Records, 2010
