= Wand (band) =

American psychedelic rock band

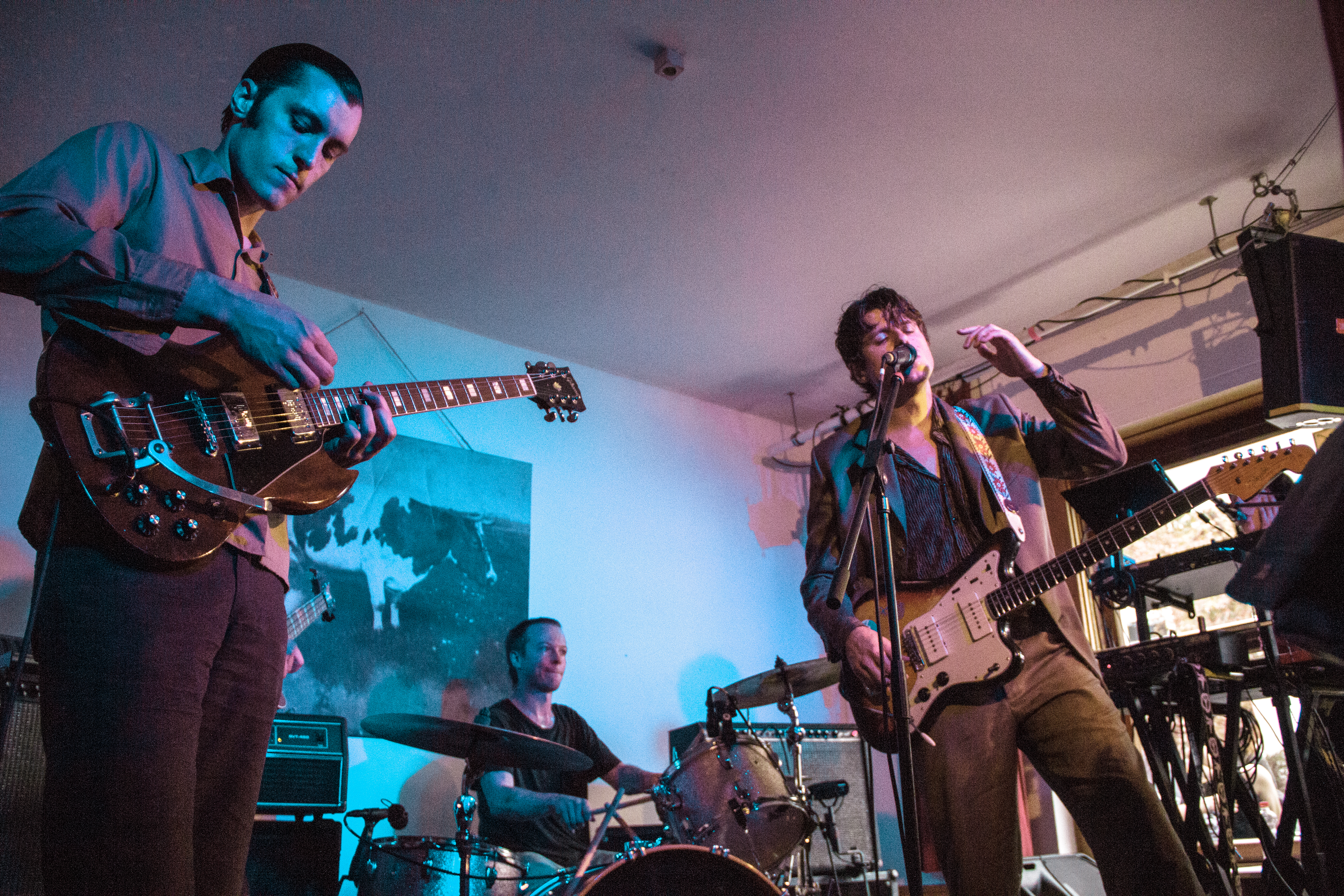
- Wand at Haldern Pop Festival 2019

Background information
- Origin: Los Angeles, California, United States
- Genres: Psychedelic rock, garage rock, noise rock, shoegazing, stoner rock
- Years active: 2013–present
- Labels: Drag City, In the Red, God? Records
- Members: Cory Hanson; Evan Backer; Robert Cody; Evan Burrows
- Past members: Daniel Martens; Sofia Arreguin; Lee Landey
- Website: wand.band

Wand is an American psychedelic rock band from Los Angeles, California, United States, formed in 2013. The band consists of Cory Hanson (vocals, guitar), Robert Cody (guitar), Evan Backer (bass) and Evan Burrows (drums).

Since their formation, the band has released five albums in five years: Ganglion Reef (2014), Golem (2015), 1000 Days (2015), Plum (2017) and Laughing Matter (2019). Following the live release Spiders in the Rain in 2022 and some solo work by frontman Cory Hanson, the band returned with 2024's Vertigo.

== History ==
=== Formation and Ganglion Reef (2013–2014) ===
Prior to forming Wand, vocalist and guitarist Cory Hanson performed under the moniker W.H.I.T.E. Hanson also played guitar with Mikal Cronin, and in the bands together PANGEA, and Meatbodies. Working on the songs that would become the band's debut album, Ganglion Reef, Hanson subsequently re-recorded his material after forming Wand with former art school classmates Lee Landey and Evan Burrows: "[I] found a band, and we re-recorded everything and then just started playing... really intensely." Regarding the band's name, Hanson noted: "We wanted a name that was kind of empty, like a wand is more of an idea, like a magical tool; it's a means, a vessel to execute a superhuman thing."

Wand released the album on fellow-garage rock act Ty Segall's Drag City imprint, God? Records, and subsequently supported him on tour. Regarding the experience, Hanson stated: "[The tour] was great, it was a little bit crazy for us because we've never toured before. And the turnout—it was just a lot of people, and we were all surprised by how warmly received, how receptive everyone was to hearing us play because no one had ever heard us before. And Ty's super fun to tour with."

=== Golem and 1000 Days (2015–2016) ===
The band quickly recorded its second studio album, Golem, with producer and engineer Chris Woodhouse, best known for his work with the garage rock act, Thee Oh Sees. The album was recorded in twelve days, with Hanson stating: "I went in thinking, 'Oh, this is going to be a really grimy, disgusting record with these really fucked-up guitars.' And then Chris sort of took a different turn, because he just kind of gave it a Big Star treatment. So the production is, like, bizarrely pristine and all of the performances are really fucked and weird."

Six months later, the band released its self-produced follow-up, 1000 Days, on Drag City. Prior to the album's recording and release, guitarist Daniel Martens temporarily stepped down from the band, with bass guitarist Lee Landey stating: "He's not touring with us this time because he's just had a baby." The band was subsequently referred to as a three-piece, with Martens remaining absent from press photographs.

Regarding a potential fourth album, Hanson noted: "I think we're a little more interested in having some more creative elbow room to push out something that feels like the right next step, rather than having this consistent output of record, tour, record, tour. Having a little bit more time to work could only benefit the way that we think about making records at this point." In 2016, the band added guitarist Robert Cody and keyboardist Sofia Arreguin to their core line-up.

=== Plum and Perfume (2017–2018) ===
On June 27, 2017, a video for the song "Plum" was released on the Drag City YouTube channel. A music video for the track "Bee Karma" was also released on August 10, 2017, directed by Hanson, utilising Super 8 film and starring his brother Casey.

The album Plum was subsequently released on September 22, 2017.

On February 27, 2018, a day after the band concluded their Plum tour, Cory Hanson announced on his Instagram that Wand would be releasing a thirty-minute EP entitled Perfume on May 25, 2018. A single song, "The Gift", was released on the day of the announcement.

=== Laughing Matter and Spiders in the Rain (2019–2024) ===
Wand released their fifth album, Laughing Matter, on April 19, 2019. The album received positive reviews from both Pitchfork and Stereogum. Live album Spiders in the Rain followed in 2022.

=== Vertigo (2024–present) ===
Vertigo was released in 2024.

== Side projects ==
In 2016, both Cory Hanson and Evan Burrows were members of Ty Segall's backing band The Muggers, touring in support of Segall's eighth studio album, Emotional Mugger.

Cory Hanson has also released four solo albums:

- 2016 – The Unborn Capitalist from Limbo
- 2021 – Pale Horse Rider
- 2023 – Western Cum
- 2025 – I Love People

== Band members ==
Current members

- Evan Burrows – drums (2013–present)
- Cory Hanson – vocals, guitar (2013–present)
- Robert Cody – guitar (2016–present)
- Evan Backer – bass guitar (2022–present)

Former members

- Daniel Martens
- Sofia Arreguin
- Lee Landey

== Discography ==
Studio albums

- Ganglion Reef (2014)
- Golem (2015)
- 1000 Days (2015)
- Plum (2017)
- Laughing Matter (2019)
- Vertigo (2024)

Live albums

- Spiders in the Rain (2022)

Other releases

- From a Capsule Underground (2017, demos and studio outtakes)
- Perfume (2018, EP)
- Help Desk/Goldfish (2024, EP)

Singles

- "Machine Man" (2015)
- "Help Desk" (2024)
