= Twin Peaks (band) =

American indie rock band

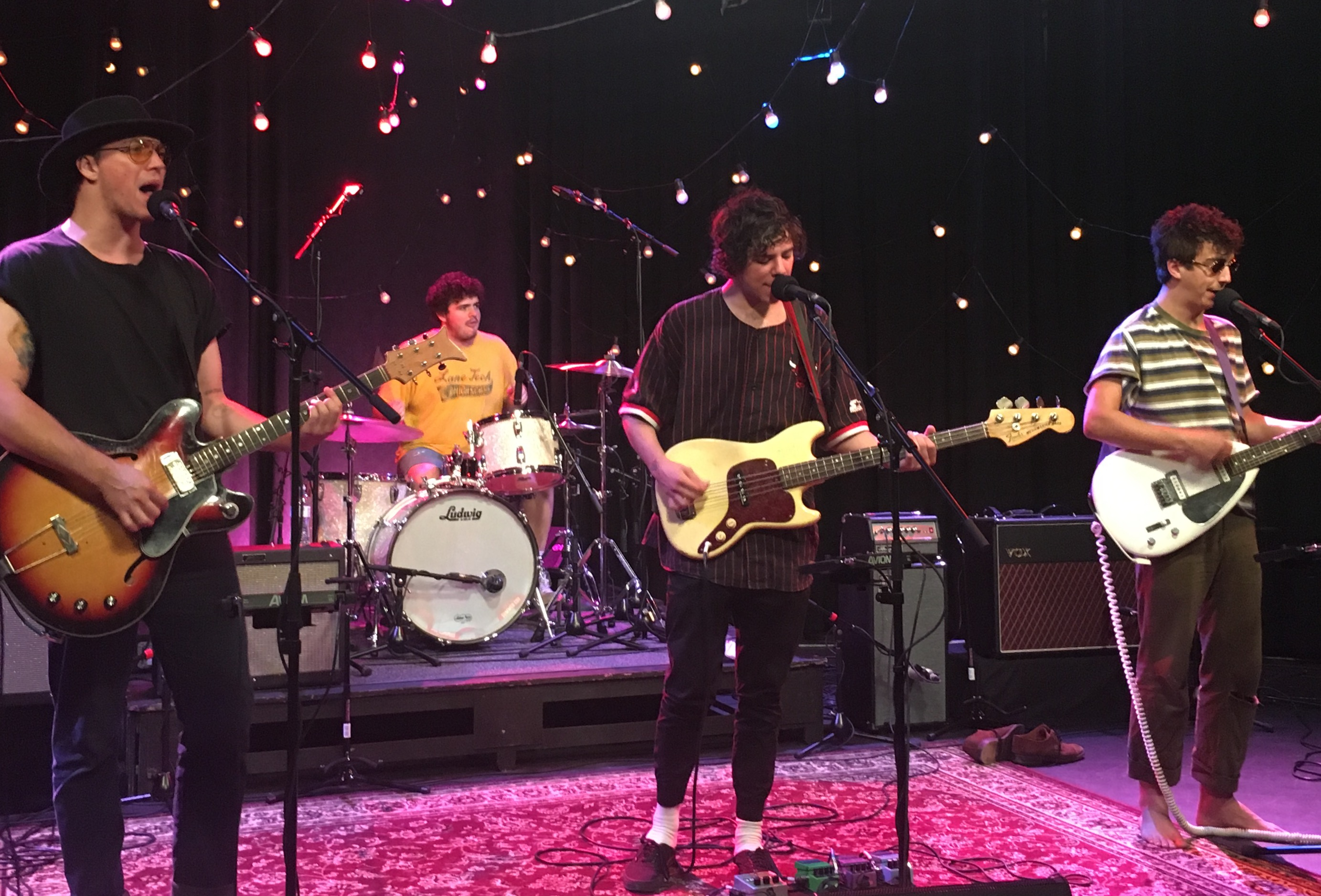
- Twin Peaks performing a live session at the KXT studios in September 2016: (left to right) Cadien Lake James, Connor Brodner, Jack Dolan, Clay Frankel

Background information
- Origin: Chicago, Illinois
- Genres: Garage rock; indie rock; power pop; garage punk
- Years active: 2010–2020, 2025-present
- Labels: Autumn Tone; Grand Jury; Communion; Inertia; Space 44
- Members: Cadien Lake James; Clay Frankel; Jack Dolan; Connor Brodner; Colin Croom
- Website: twinpeaksdudes.com

Twin Peaks is an American indie rock band from Chicago, Illinois. The band was formed in 2010 and consists of Cadien Lake James (vocals, guitar), Clay Frankel (vocals, guitar), Jack Dolan (vocals, bass guitar), Colin Croom (keyboards, vocals, guitar), and Connor Brodner (drums).

== History ==
=== Early years ===
Cadien Lake James formed the band in 2010 with childhood friends Jack Dolan and Connor Brodner when they were still in high school. James and Dolan attended Jones College Prep, while Brodner attended Lane Tech High School with Frankel, who later joined the band. Before Frankel played with Twin Peaks, he was in a different group called Crash Hero; James said in an interview, "We ended up stealing him from his other band." James' older brother Hal was the drummer for fellow Chicago band Smith Westerns.

While in high school, James and Dolan were among a number of students who received ten-day suspensions for smoking marijuana, however it was later reported that Dolan was only returning the homework of James and never participated with the group. One of the other students was their friend Chance the Rapper, who later named his first mixtape 10 Day after the incident.

Twin Peaks arose out of Chicago's DIY music scene, attending and eventually playing DIY shows in houses throughout the city. Frankel lived in one of the better-known spaces called Animal Kingdom. James, Brodner, and Dolan started attending these shows when they were 15, getting to know the members of bands like White Mystery, the Yolks, and Magic Milk. The band's name references the television series Twin Peaks, although none of its members had seen the show at the time.

=== Sunken ===
After graduating high school, all the band's members save for Frankel attended The Evergreen State College in Olympia, Washington, but later dropped out to pursue music. Soon enough the band started to outgrow the Chicago DIY scene. The band's first recorded project led to it being labeled the "next big thing" by NME.

In 2012, the band recorded their debut album, Sunken, in James' basement using "a crappy iMac from 2004, a broken digital mixer, and a digital recording studio from the '90s". The 20-minute album, named after a park in Chicago where the band members used to drink as teenagers, was released on July 9, 2013, through Los Angeles-based independent record label Autumn Tone Records, an imprint of Aquarium Drunkard. People began to approach the band to sell the album on vinyl.

=== Wild Onion ===
The band began work on their follow-up record, Wild Onion, in January 2014 in Chicago. The album was released by Grand Jury on August 5, 2014, in North America, and in the UK on September 1, 2014, by Communion Music. Rolling Stone gave the album a 3.5 out of 5 saying that they "pull off Exile-era Stones strut and Velvet Underground guitar poesy with a sophistication that’s beyond their years, and a sense of humor, too."

James explains that "the album deals with a lot of insecurities that arise when you’re growing up." The music video for "Making Breakfast", a song on the album written and sung by Frankel, was released in October 2014.

The band had a breakout performance at Pitchfork Music Festival in July 2014, just before Wild Onion was released. Prior to the festival, James broke his foot at a concert in New Orleans and had to play from a wheelchair. The performance received a lot of press and some called it the best set of the weekend. The following summer, Twin Peaks played Lollapalooza for the first time.

Twin Peaks' first European tour was in February 2015. In addition to club shows, they played several house parties in the UK. They later released a tour film documenting the trip. They also returned to Europe that summer to play both Roskilde in Denmark and Reading & Leeds festivals in the UK. In September 2015, Twin Peaks went on tour supporting Wavves in N. America.

The song 'Mirror Of Time' from the 'Wild Onion' album, was used by Finn Wolfhard in his debut short feature film 'Night Shifts' which was released on YouTube on February 14, 2021.

=== Down In Heaven ===
Twin Peaks recorded the bulk of their third album Down in Heaven in August 2015 at a friend's house in the Berkshires. R. Andrew Humphrey returned to co-produce and John Agnello later mixed the album in NYC. The first single "Walk to the One You Love," was written by James and released on February 1, 2016, along with the album's announcement. The second single, "Butterfly," released on March 30, 2016, was written by Frankel during SXSW 2015 when he was in a "sickened state." The third single "Holding Roses" was released on April 19, 2016. Down In Heaven was released on May 13, 2016, and the band went on tour to promote its release. The band made their late night TV debut on Conan, where they performed "Walk to The One You Love" in June.

This album expanded their reach and led to their first tour of Australia, as well as tours supporting Cage the Elephant and Portugal. The Man. They also played Bonnaroo for the first time in June 2016 and played Pitchfork Festival for the second time in July 2016. In 2016, following the Chicago Cubs World Series Championship, Twin Peaks played the team's trophy party. The Cubs, Theo Epstein, Bill Murray, and Eddie Vedder were all in attendance.

=== Urbs in Horto ===
On May 5, 2017, Twin Peaks released a live double LP titled Urbs in Horto. The album features recordings from the band's shows at Metro and Thalia Hall in Chicago from December 2016, where they closed out a big year by selling almost 3000 tickets in their hometown. The album includes songs from across the band's three studio records, as well as a cover of The Rolling Stones' "Dead Flowers." Urbs in Horto was recorded to tape.

=== Sweet '17 Singles ===
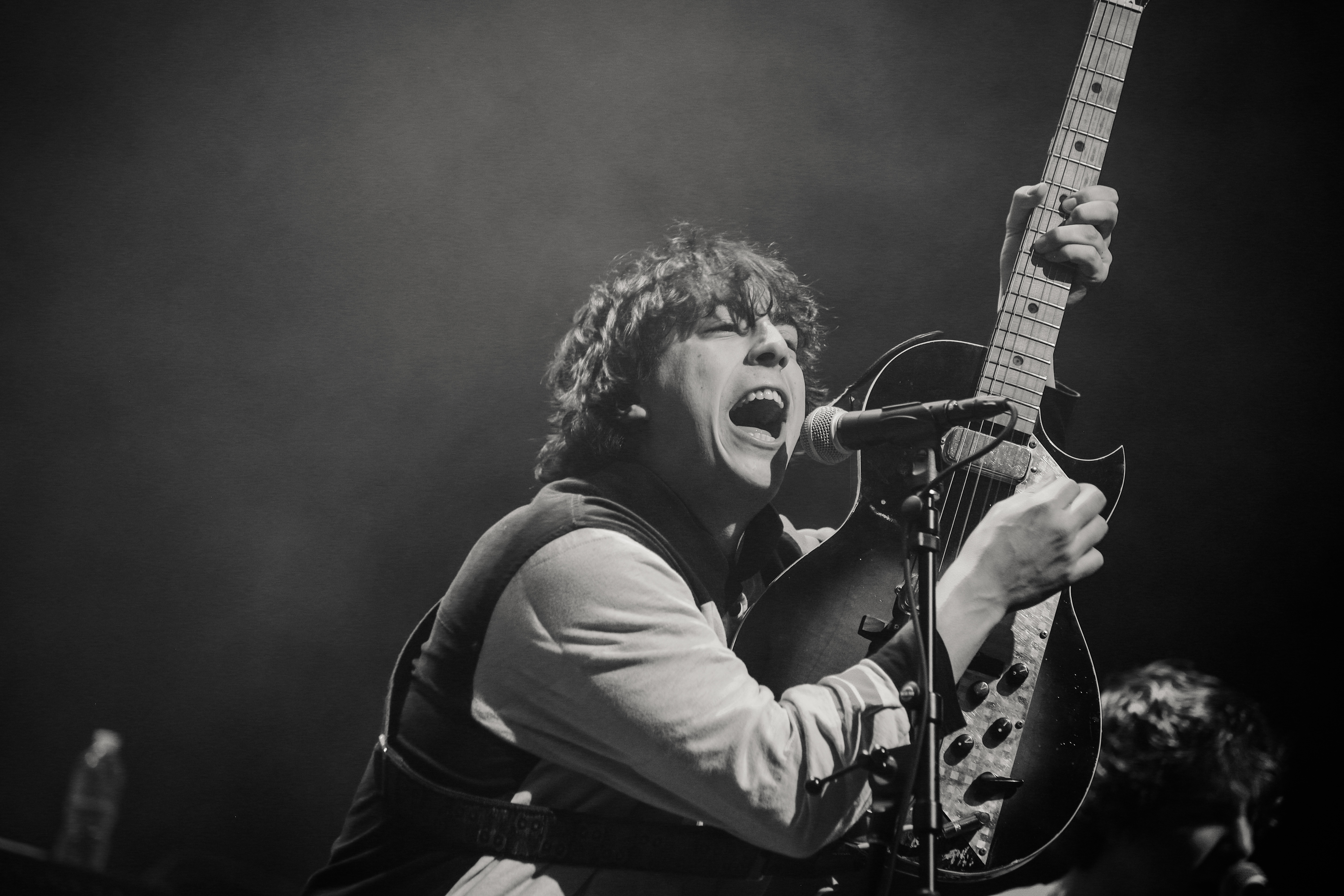
Clay Frankel with Twin Peaks at the Palace Theatre in St. Paul

Beginning in July 2017, Twin Peaks released two new songs every month through December 2017. They titled this project Sweet ’17 Singles. 7" vinyl singles were sent to the 300 subscribers each month and the tracks were also made available digitally.

James also produced and record the debut extended play (EP) by Calpurnia, Scout after being introduced to lead singer Finn Wolfhard by Stranger Things castmate Joe Keery.

=== Lookout Low ===
On September 13, 2019, Twin Peaks released their fourth studio album Lookout Low. The album was preceded by three singles "Dance Through It," "Ferry Song" and "Oh Mama". Lookout Low was recorded at Monnow Valley in Wales and produced by Ethan Johns. Johns helped the band get out of their comfort zone by having them record the vocals with the band to help capture the raw energy of their live shows. The band also expanded their sound citing influences from the Grateful Dead in the album.

=== Side A release and hiatus ===
On July 3, 2020, the band released a 4-song EP titled Side A. Following its release, the band was largely inactive for several years, seeing no show announcements or new music releases for five years, though no official break-up or hiatus was ever announced.

=== Reunion and Down In Heaven anniversary shows ===
In November 2025, the band announced new dates at Chicago's Thalia Hall in May 2026 to commemorate the 10th anniversary of the release of Down in Heaven. The initial dates were May 14-15, 2026, which sold out in minutes. The band continued to announce shows over the next few days until 8 nights in May sold out, a Thalia Hall record for one band (May 14 - 21).

== Critical reception ==
The band's musical style is regarded as a mixture of "'60s garage rock and the 2010s garage punk sound." Jayson Greene of Pitchfork stated that the band "spends half their time as a chugging power chord factory and half as a winsome power-pop band." The band's musical style on their debut album has been described as "sloppy, Replacements-inspired rock" while the band's second album features "a garage-rock sound that touches on everything from fuzz-soaked psychedelia and punk to ballads and baroque pop." The band's influences on the album include garage rock acts such as Black Lips, Jay Reatard, Ty Segall and The Strokes, and rock artists such as the Beatles, The Stooges, The Beach Boys, and the Rolling Stones.

== Band members ==
- Cadien Lake James – guitar, vocals (2010–present)
- Clay Frankel – guitar, vocals (2010–present)
- Jack Dolan – bass guitar, vocals (2010–present)
- Colin Croom – keyboards, guitar, vocals (2014–present)
- Connor Brodner – drums, percussion (2010–present)

== Discography ==
=== Studio albums ===
- Sunken (2013)
- Wild Onion (2014)
- Down in Heaven (2016)
- Lookout Low (2019)

=== Live albums ===
- Urbs in Horto (2017)
- Freezing in Chicago — Live at Thalia Hall, December 31st, 2017 (2026)

=== Compilation albums ===
- Sweet '17 Singles (2018)

=== Singles and EPs ===
- "Stand in the Sand" (2013)
- "Flavor" (2014)
- "In the Morning (In the Evening) / "Got Your Money" (2015)
- "Walk to the One You Love" (2016)
- "Butterfly" (2016)
- "Holding Roses" (2016)
- "I Don't Wanna Miss You" / "Disappear" (2016)
- "Tossing Tears" / "Under the Pines" (2017)
- "Shake Your Lonely" / "Sun and the Trees" (2017)
- "Come for Me" / "Fat Chance" (2017)
- "With You" / "Just Because" (2017)
- "In the Meadow" / "We Will Not Make It (Not Without You)" (2017)
- "Dance Through It" (2019)
- "Ferry Song" (2019)
- "Oh Mama" (2019)
- "Our World" (2019)
- "Spiders (Kidsmoke)" (2019)
- "Cawfee" / "St. Vulgar St." (2020)
- "What's the Matter" (2020)
- Side A (2020)

== Music videos ==
- "Baby Blue" (2012)
- "Stand in the Sand" (2012; dir. Ryan Ohm)
- "Flavor" (2014; dir. Ryan Baxley)
- "I Found a New Way" (2014; dir. Ryan Ohm)
- "Mind Frame" (2014; dir. Ryan Ohm)
- "Making Breakfast" (2014; dir. Ryan Ohm)
- "Ocean Blue" (2013; dir. Jake O'Hagan)
- "Walk to the One You Love" (2016)
- "Butterfly" (2016; dir. Ezra Ewen)
- "Holding Roses" (2016)
- "Wanted You" (2017; dir. Ezra Ewen)
- "Dance Through It" (2019; dir. Ariel Fisher and Léo Schrepel)
- "Unfamiliar Sun" (2020; dir. Wyatt Grant)
- "Whistle in the Wind (End of Everything)" (2020)
