= The Hunches =

American garage rock band

- Origin: Portland, Oregon
- Genre: Garage rock
- Years active: 2000–2009
- Label: In the Red
- Members: Chris Gunn; Hart Gledhill; Sarah Epstein; Ben Spencer

The Hunches were a garage rock band from Portland, Oregon active from 2000 to 2009. They released three studio albums: Yes. No. Shut It (2002), Hobo Sunrise (2004), and Exit Dreams (2009), all on In the Red Records.

== Discography ==
- Yes. No. Shut It. (In the Red, 2002)
- Hobo Sunrise (In the Red, 2004)
- Exit Dreams (In the Red, 2009)
- Home Alone 5 (In the Red, 2009)
- The Hunches (Almost Ready compilation, 2016)
