= Fuzz (band) =

American rock band

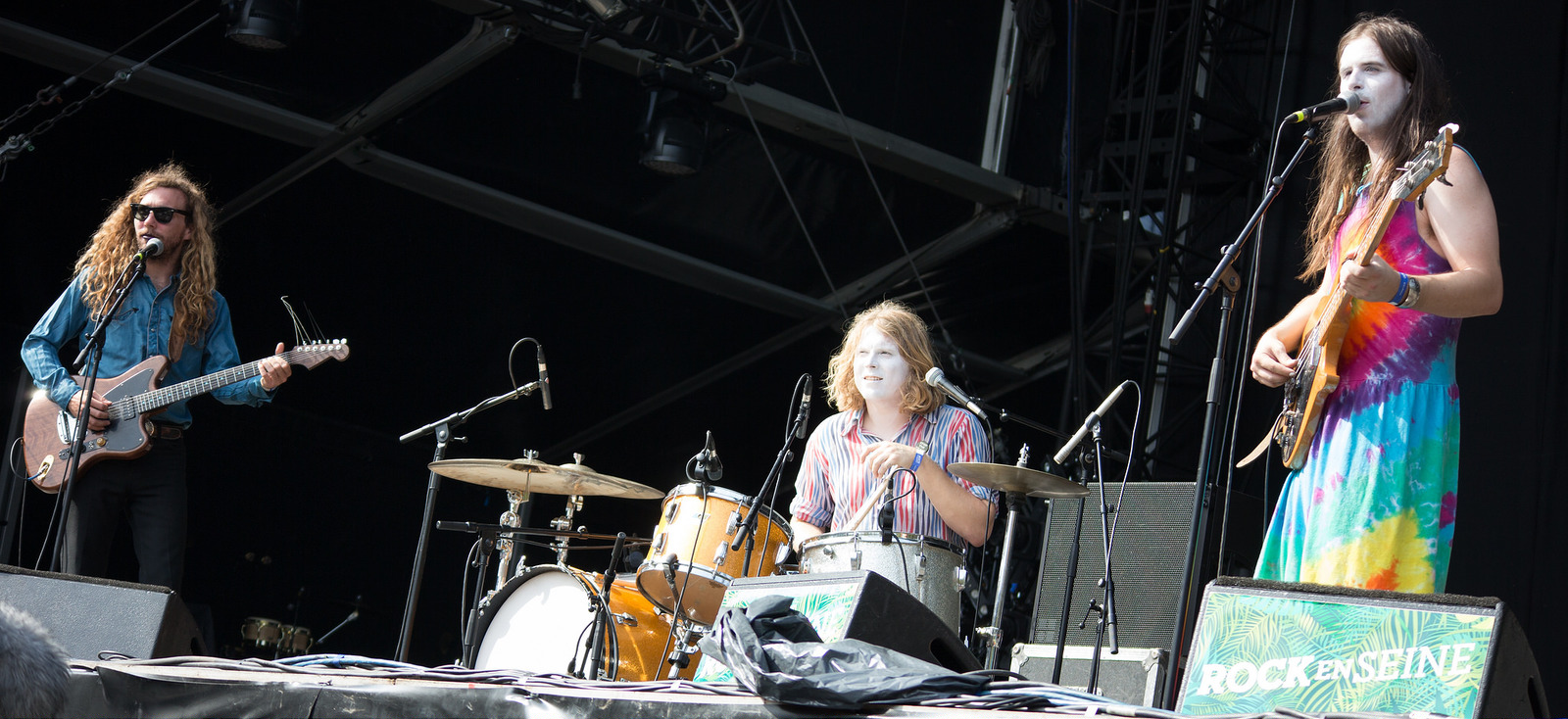
- Fuzz performing at the Rock en Seine in 2015

Background information
- Origin: San Francisco, California, U.S.
- Genres: Hard rock, psychedelic rock, heavy metal, acid rock
- Years active: 2011–present
- Labels: Trouble in Mind, In the Red Records, Castle Face Records, Famous Class
- Members: Ty Segall; Charles Moothart; Chad Ubovich
- Past members: Roland Cosio

Fuzz is a rock band from San Francisco formed in 2011. The band consists of Charles Moothart (vocals, guitar), Ty Segall (vocals, drums), and Chad Ubovich (vocals, bass guitar).

Created as an outlet for Moothart's affection for hard rock riffs, Fuzz began as collaboration between Moothart and Segall, while Moothart performed in Segall's live band. In 2012, they released two singles, "This Time I Got a Reason" and "Sleigh Ride", and were joined by the bass guitarist Roland Cosio.

In October 2013, the band released its first album, Fuzz. While touring the album, Ubovich (Meatbodies and Mikal Cronin Band) replaced Cosio on bass guitar. In October 2015, Fuzz released a second album, entitled II. It was written in a more collaborative manner than the band members had generally experienced before. In October 2020, a third album, entitled III, was released.

== History ==
Regarding the band's origins, vocalist and guitarist Moothart said that the project began at his home. "I was sitting in my house one day, before I was in Ty's band or anything, wondering how hard it would be to write a hard rock song. I was trying to figure out if it'd be ridiculous, or sound like shit. I just tried and then eventually showed the stuff to Ty. He was stoked on it and then we tried to jam together. It was really more to have fun. He mentioned playing drums. We wanted to play music like that, just to see if it was possible." The band's first album was released in 2013.

When joining the band, the bass guitarist Ubovich noted that the writing process for II differed from previous collaborations and projects with one another. "We all kind of did something we’ve never done before, which was write together as a band. That was a first for all of us. Usually in our respective projects it’s all about writing on our own, and that process. This time we tried something definitely new." Still in Rock tied the album with Mac Demarco's Another One for the third best album of 2015. In July 2020, "Returning", the first song from the band's third album was released. The album, entitled III, was released on 23 October 2020.

== Discography ==
=== Studio albums ===
- Fuzz (2013)
- II (2015)
- III (2020)

=== Live albums ===
- Levitation Sessions (2021, The Reverberation Appreciation Society)

=== Singles and EPs ===
- "This Time I Got a Reason"/"Fuzz's Fourth Dream" – 7" (2012, Trouble in Mind)
- "Sleigh Ride"/"You Won't See Me" – 7" (2013, In the Red)
- Live in San Francisco EP – 12" (2013, Castle Face Records)
- "Sunderberry Dream"/"21st Century Schizoid Man" – 7" (2013, In the Red)
- "Till the End of the Day" (Kinks cover) – 7" (2014, Famous Class)
