= Scout (EP) =

EP by Calpurnia
- Released: 15 June 2018
- Genre: Indie rock, alternative rock
- Length: 23:26
- Label: Royal Mountain; paradYse; Transgressive
- Producer: Cadien Lake James

Singles from Scout
- 1. "City Boy" Released: 7 March 2018; 2. "Louie" Released: 12 April 2018; 3. "Greyhound" Released: 18 May 2018

Scout is the only extended play (EP) by Canadian rock band Calpurnia. It was released on 15 June 2018 through Royal Mountain, Transgressive and paradYse. It was also the band's only release, as they disbanded a year afterwards.

== Background ==
Calpurnia signed to the Toronto-based independent record label Royal Mountain Records in November 2017, beginning recording an unnamed extended play, with Cadien Lake James from the American indie rock band, Twin Peaks. In January 2018, the band played at the Rough Trade shop in New York City, where they debuted "Louie", "Wasting Time", "Greyhound" and "City Boy" from the then-unannounced EP.

After releasing the second single, "Louie", in April 2018, the band officially announced Scout and its release date.

== Promotion ==
=== Singles and music videos ===
The lead single from the EP, "City Boy", was released on 7 March 2018. The music video, released simultaneously, was shot and edited by Josiah Marshall, showing the band in a recording session. The second single, "Louie", was released on 12 April, along with an animated music video by Jason Bartell. On 18 May Calpurnia released "Greyhound".

=== Rough Trade exclusive ===
Rough Trade released a limited-edition 7" single, "Greyhound/Louie", on 18 May 2018. The single contained "Greyhound", as well as the songs "Louie" and "Waves".

== Track listing ==
All tracks are written by Calpurnia.

No.	Title	Length
1.	"Louie"	2:59
2.	"Wasting Time"	2:09
3.	"Greyhound"	4:48
4.	"City Boy"	3:23
5.	"Blame"	3:27
6.	"Waves"	6:40
Total length:		23:26

== Release history ==
Country	Date	Format	Label
United States	18 April 2018	CD; DL; LP	Royal Mountain
Canada	18 April 2018	CD; DL; LP	Royal Mountain
United Kingdom	18 April 2018	CD; DL; LP	paradYse; Transgressive
Europe	18 April 2018	CD; DL; LP	paradYse; Transgressive
