= Plum (Wand album) =

Studio album by Wand
- Released: September 22, 2017
- Length: 42:15
- Label: Drag City

Wand chronology
1000 Days (2015)	Plum (2017)	From a Capsule Underground (2017)

Plum is the fourth studio album by American band Wand. It was released on September 22, 2017 through Drag City Records. The album was recorded following the band's previous studio album, 1000 Days (2015).

== Reception ==
Professional ratings
Aggregate scores
Source	Rating
Metacritic	76/100
Review scores
Source	Rating
AllMusic	2.5/5 stars
Blurt	4/5 stars
Exclaim!	7/10
Paste	9.1/10
Pitchfork	7.9/10

Accolades for Plum
Publication	Accolade	Rank
Loud and Quiet	Top 40 Albums of 2017	28
Paste	Top 50 Albums of 2017	45
Time Out	Top 29 Albums of 2017	23
Uncut	Top 75 Albums of 2017	58

== Track listing ==
Plum track listing
No.	Title	Length
1.	"Setting"	1:00
2.	"Plum"	4:16
3.	"Bee Karma"	3:55
4.	"Charles De Gaulle"	4:17
5.	"High Rise"	2:43
6.	"White Cat"	4:14
7.	"The Trap"	4:44
8.	"Ginger"	2:10
9.	"Blue Cloud"	7:50
10.	"Driving"	7:06
Total length:		42:15

== Personnel ==
Adapted from AllMusic's Credits section for Plum.

Wand

- Cory Hanson – vocals, guitar
- Robert Cody – guitar
- Sofia Arreguin – Moog synthesizer, piano, percussion, vocals
- Lee Landey – bass
- Evan Burrows – drums, percussion
