= Spiders in the Rain =

Live album by Wand
- Released: October 28, 2022
- Recorded: January 2020
- Venue: California
- Genre: Psychedelic rock
- Length: 71:02
- Label: Drag City

Wand chronology
Laughing Matter (2019)	Spiders in the Rain (2022)	Vertigo (2024)

Spiders in the Rain is a 2022 live album by American psychedelic rock band Wand.

== Reception ==
According to the review aggregator Metacritic, Spiders in the Rain received "generally favorable reviews" based on a weighted average score of 72 out of 100 from four critic scores. Editors at AllMusic rated this album 3.5 out of 5 stars, with critic Fred Thomas writing that this release "does a fantastic job of illustrating just how different Wand can be on-stage, finding the band breaking away from the precision and detail of their recordings and embracing raw, visceral playing on songs that often extend into raging jams, fuzzy dirges, or sonic attacks of spectral confusion". Glide Magazine's Shawn Donohue called this release a "distinct" live album with songs that "delve... into glorious aural pastures" and makes for an "incredibly adventurous rock outing" that displays the "group’s unique mix of noise/psych/jam/shoegaze/alternative rock". Writing for Under the Radar, Chris Drabick recommended against new listeners using this as an introduction to the band and their distinct phases of musical development and characterized this as "inessential but pretty darned good" in a review that scored it 6 out of 10.

== Track listing ==
All songs written by Wand.

1. "Hare" – 4:39
2. "Wonder" – 6:23
3. "Plum" – 6:26
4. "White Cat" – 19:42
5. "Evening Star" – 6:55
6. "Blue Cloud" – 11:41
7. "The Gift" – 5:00
8. "Self Hypnosis" – 5:02
9. "Melted Rope" – 5:14

== Personnel ==
Wand

- Sofia Arreguin – instrumentation
- Evan Burrows – instrumentation, mixing
- Robbie Cody – instrumentation, mixing
- Cory Hanson – instrumentation, vocals
- Lee Landey – instrumentation

Additional personnel

- Zac Hernandez – engineering, mixing
- Sam Klickner – artwork, layout
- Mike Kriebel – engineering
- Ansley Elizabeth Lee – photography

== See also ==
- 2022 in American music
