= Ganglion Reef =

Studio album by Wand
- Released: August 26, 2014
- Genre: Neo-psychedelia
- Length: 35:04
- Language: English
- Label: God? Records/Drag City

Wand chronology
Ganglion Reef (2014)	Golem (2015)

Ganglion Reef is the debut studio album by American neo-psychedelia rock band Wand, released in 2014. The album has received positive reviews from critics.

== Reception ==
Editors at AllMusic rated this album 3.5 out of 5 stars, with critic Fred Thomas writing that this is "a nonstop parade of acid-dipped, pop-minded forays into both heaviness and wavy folk detours" that shows a "gift for songwriting [that] guides the endless psychedelic tug of war that is Ganglion Reef, offering listeners something turbulent and strange but deeply rooted in strong tunes". Nina Corcoran of Consequence of Sound rated this album a B, characterizing this album as "dressed in garage clothing, letting psych riffs wobble around in a single stained Converse and a muddy Doc Martens", drawing on Are You Experienced? and Revolver. Editors at Pitchfork scored this release 7.4 out of 10 and critic Jason Heller called this release "euphorically hypnotic" due to vocalist Cory Hanson's delivery and he continued that the music differentiates itself from the larger field of contemporary psychedelic rock by writing that "rather than wallowing in inner space, it’s a gateway to other worlds, not so much an escape as an intrepid exploration". In 2021, upon the release of Hanson's Pale Horse Rider, Uncut's Peter Watts gave a review to Ganglion Reef, scoring it an 8 out of 10 for being an "excellent psych-rock and sludge debut... drenched in echo and reverb".

== Track listing ==
1. "Send/Receive (Mind)" – 3:07
2. "Clearer" – 3:34
3. "Broken Candle" – 2:40
4. "Fire on the Mountain (I–II–III)" – 5:07
5. "On Ganglion Reef" – 0:19
6. "Flying Golem" – 3:20
7. "Strange Inertia (Ctrl Alt Death)" – 3:21
8. "6661" – 3:42
9. "Growing Up Boys" – 3:46
10. "Generator Larping" – 6:08

== Personnel ==
Wand

- Evan Burrows – drums, mixing, audio mastering
- Cory Hanson – guitar, vocals, production, mixing, mastering
- Lee Landey – bass guitar, production, mixing, mastering
- Daniel Martens – guitar, production, mixing, mastering

Additional personnel

- Kevin Carle – recording
- Martin Tryon – mastering
- Meghan Tryon – artwork
- Andrew Schubert – recording

== See also ==
- 2014 in American music
- 2014 in rock music
- List of 2014 albums
