= Wild Onion (album) =

Studio album by Twin Peaks
- Released: August 5, 2014
- Studio: Observatory Studios
- Genre: Garage rock
- Length: 40:03
- Label: Grand Jury; Communion
- Producer: R. Andrew Humphrey; Colin Croom

Twin Peaks chronology
Sunken (2013)	Wild Onion (2014)	Down in Heaven (2016)

Singles from Wild Onion
- 1. "Flavor" Released: June 26, 2014

Professional ratings
Aggregate scores
Source	Rating
Metacritic	75/100
Review scores
Source	Rating
Pitchfork	6.9/10
Consequence of Sound	B
Rolling Stone	3.5/5 stars
Renowned for Sound	3.5/5 stars
The A.V. Club	B
DIY	4 stars

Wild Onion is the second studio album by American rock band Twin Peaks. It was released on August 5, 2014, in North America by Grand Jury and later in the rest of the world by Communion.

== Reception ==
Wild Onion received positive reviews. The A.V. Club notes that the album "doubles both its length and offerings, while considerably upgrading the songwriting and production values." Rolling Stone praises the album, while comparing the band to some of their biggest influences: The Rolling Stones and The Velvet Underground. "The spunky quartet pull off Exile-era Stones strut and Velvet Underground guitar poesy with sophistication that's beyond their years, and a sense of humor, too." Consequence of Sound says, "Rather than a barrier, the band's youthfulness might be their biggest weapon... listening to Wild Onion just makes you hungry to see what else they have in store."

== Track listing ==
All tracks are written by Connor Brodner, Jack Dolan, Clay Frankel and Cadien Lake James.

No.	Title	Lead vocals	Length
1.	"I Found A New Way"	Clay Frankel	2:46
2.	"Strawberry Smoothie"	Cadien James	2:24
3.	"Mirror of Time"	James	2:20
4.	"Sloop Jay D"	Jack Dolan	3:24
5.	"Making Breakfast"	Frankel	2:13
6.	"Strange World"	James	1:50
7.	"Fade Away"	Dolan	2:00
8.	"Sweet Thing"	Frankel	2:08
9.	"Stranger World"	instrumental	1:14
10.	"Telephone"	James	2:54
11.	"Flavor"	James	2:01
12.	"Ordinary People"	James	3:43
13.	"Good Lovin'"	Frankel	3:11
14.	"Hold On"	James	2:09
15.	"No Way Out"	James	3:46
16.	"Mind Frame"	James	2:08
Total length:			40:03

== Personnel ==
Twin Peaks

- Connor Brodner – drums
- Jack Dolan – lead vocals (4, 7), bass guitar
- Clay Frankel – lead vocals (1, 5, 8, 13), guitar
- Cadien Lake James – lead vocals (2, 3, 6, 10, 11, 12, 14, 15, 16), guitar

Production

- Doug Boehm – mixer
- Colin Croom – producer, recording
- R. Andrew Humphrey – producer, recording
- Pete Lyman – mastering
