= The Unborn Capitalist from Limbo =

Studio album by Cory Hanson
- Released: November 18, 2016
- Genre: Folk pop; folk rock; psychedelic folk; psychedelic rock
- Length: 30:49
- Label: Drag City

Cory Hanson chronology
The Unborn Capitalist from Limbo (2016)	Pale Horse Rider (2021)

The Unborn Capitalist from Limbo is the debut studio album by American psychedelic rock musician Cory Hanson, released by Drag City on November 18, 2016. It has received positive reviews from critics.

== Reception ==
According to the review aggregator Metacritic, The Unborn Capitalist from Limbo received "universal acclaim" based on a weighted average score of 81 out of 100 from seven critic scores. Editors at AllMusic rated this album 4 out of 5 stars, with critic Tim Sendra writing that the album is like a collection of protest songs and "a very pretty orchestrated folk-pop album". In Exclaim!, Zack French rated this release a 7 out of 10, calling it "simultaneously unsettling and comforting in nature", continuing that "Hanson achieves what he ostensibly set out to do here: set a mood stuck somewhere between Heaven and Earth". Michael Hann of The Guardian rated this album 4 out of 5 stars, characterizing it as a "pastoral gem". Joe Goggins of Loud and Quiet rated this album a 7 out of 10, comparing the music to Nick Drake and The Plastic Ono Band, writing that "by way of a counterpoint to them, the lyrics are unyielding in their opacity, throwing up nightmarish distortions of everyday life". Record Collector's Jake Kennedy scored The Unborn Capitalist from Limbo 4 out of 5 stars for having both "a fair amount of whimsy" and a "focused, emotional side". An Uncut review of Hanson's follow-up Pale Horse Rider included a brief review of this album, giving it a 6 out of 10 for being "sufficiently different" from Wand to justify a solo release.

== Track listing ==
All songs written by Cory Hanson.

1. "The Unborn Capitalist from Limbo" – 3:48
2. "Replica" – 4:08
3. "Garden of Delight" – 3:51
4. "Violent Moon" – 2:54
5. "Ordinary People" – 3:27
6. "Evening Glass" – 4:04
7. "Flu Moon" – 3:26
8. "Arrival" – 5:12

== Personnel ==
- Cory Hanson – instrumentation, vocals
- Heather Lockie – string arrangement
