= Sunken (album) =

Studio album by Twin Peaks
- Released: July 9, 2013
- Studio: Heartland House
- Length: 19:24
- Label: Autumn Tone
- Producer: Twin Peaks

Twin Peaks chronology
Sunken (2013)	Wild Onion (2014)

Sunken is the debut studio album by Twin Peaks, released on July 9, 2013, on Autumn Tone Records. The album was recorded in James' basement using "a crappy iMac from 2004, a broken digital mixer, and a digital recording studio from the '90s." The title of the album comes from Sunken Gardens Park, a park in Chicago where the band used to drink as teenagers.

== Reception ==
Professional ratings
Review scores
Source	Rating
AllMusic	3.5/5 stars
Consequence of Sound	C+
Pitchfork	7.1/10

The success of the album gave the group immediate critical recognition and launched them into the forefront of an emerging DIY scene in Chicago. Most of the band members were attending Evergreen State College but soon dropped out to pursue their music career.

Northern Transmission says, "you're thrown back to the 1960s to a place where guys wore leather jackets and crooned into microphones in a smoky juke joint." According to Pitchfork: "Sunken presents itself initially as an over-enthusiastic tumble, an overgrown lab puppy licking your face. They are kid-bro Smith Westerns, figuratively and literally. But Sunken hints at more than that."

== Track listing ==
All tracks are written by Cadien Lake James, Clay Frankel, Connor Brodner and Jack Dolan.

No.	Title	Lead vocals	Length
1.	"Baby Blue"	Cadien James	2:20
2.	"Natural Villain"	James	2:18
3.	"Fast Eddie"	Clay Frankel	2:30
4.	"Out of Commission"	James	1:25
5.	"Stand in the Sand"	James	2:15
6.	"Irene"	James	2:37
7.	"Boomers"	Jack Dolan	3:16
8.	"Ocean Blue"	James	2:46
Total length:			19:24

== Personnel ==
Twin Peaks

- Connor Brodner – drums
- Jack Dolan – lead vocals (7), bass guitar
- Clay Frankel – lead vocals (3), guitar
- Cadien Lake James – lead vocals (except 3 & 7), guitar
