= I Love People =

Studio album by Cory Hanson
- Released: July 25, 2025
- Genre: Pop
- Length: 37:15
- Label: Drag City

Cory Hanson chronology
Western Cum (2023)	I Love People (2025)

Singles from I Love People
- 1. "Bird on a Swing" Released: May 6, 2025; 2. "Lou Reed" Released: June 17, 2025

I Love People is the fourth studio album by American psych-rock singer-songwriter Cory Hanson. It was released on July 25, 2025, via Drag City in LP, CD, cassette and digital formats. "Bird on a Swing" was released as a single on May 6, 2025, with a music video directed by Hanson.

== Reception ==
Professional ratings
Review scores
Source	Rating
AllMusic	4/5 stars
Beats Per Minute	74%
Pitchfork	7.7/10
Spectrum Culture	82%
Uncut	4/5 stars

In a four-star review for Uncut, Sam Richards opined, "I Love People swells with strings, horns and choirs but in a way that is meticulously controlled and never gratuitous, every ounce of indulgent flab forensically removed in the manner of one of the great Nashville arrangers." John Denekamp of Oor observed that the album "sounds mainly like a classic pop record from the seventies, which reminds of a quirky songsmith like Todd Rundgren."

Writing for Spectrum Culture with a 82% rating, Trevor Zaple remarked, "Most of the album's strengths lie in big, stately piano ballads, sweetened with strings and the occasional horn passage." AllMusic's Fred Thomas stated, "Like so much of Hanson's music, these songs come on strong from one direction while hiding deeper peculiarities and weirdnesses below the surface."

Rating the album 7.7 out of ten, Ryan Meehan of Pitchfork observed, "while the blank, crosshairs-trained grimace on the album's cover is a gesture of bipartisan misanthropy, I Love People still feels like a scourging of the late Biden regime's folksy grin." Allen Hale assigned the album a rating of 74% in his review for Beats Per Minute, stating "While the album is a little front-heavy, later gems such as 'Texas Weather' provide a feel-good, windows-down sound, soaring towards the end of the LP."

== Track listing ==
I Love People track listing
No.	Title	Length
1.	"Bird on a Swing"	3:03
2.	"Joker"	3:40
3.	"I Love People"	3:48
4.	"I Don't Believe You"	2:35
5.	"Santa Claus Is Coming Back to Town"	2:28
6.	"Lou Reed"	3:14
7.	"Final Frontier"	3:45
8.	"Texas Weather"	4:21
9.	"Bad Miracles"	3:54
10.	"Old Policeman"	3:19
11.	"On the Rocks"	3:08
Total length:		37:15

== Personnel ==
Credits adapted from Bandcamp.

- Evan Backer – bass
- Joe Bozzi – mastering
- Evan Burrows – drums, percussion
- Robbie Cody – recording, mixing, producing
- Erik KM Clark – violin
- Emily Elkin – cello
- Cory Hanson – producing, vocals, piano, guitar, songwriting
- Heather Lockie – viola
- Nicole McCabe – tenor, alto sax
- Tyler Nuffer – steel (track 11)
- Ryan Parrish – baritone sax
- Asal Shahindoust – photography
- J.R.C.G. – design, layout
- Alex Wasily – trombone
- Max Whipple – contrabass (track 5)
