= Cheap Time =

American garage rock band

Cheap Time is a Nashville-based garage rock band, fronted by Jeffrey Novak. The band, which formed in 2006, has toured with Jay Reatard, Yo La Tengo, Guitar Wolf, and Mudhoney. They have released seven 7-inch singles, and four studio albums on In the Red Records: Cheap Time (2008), Fantastic Explanations (2010), Wallpaper Music (2012), and Exit Smiles (2013).

== Sound ==
Cheap Time mixes glam rock riffs and power pop melodies with elements of punk rock. The band's earlier sound was compared to early Redd Kross and The Quick. Their second album was compared to The Kinks and Alex Chilton, while their third album has been compared to classic punk bands The Saints and Magazine. Novak has stated that his favorite recording artists are John Cale, Kevin Ayers, and Peter Hammill.

== Line ups ==
=== Cheap Time #1 (2007) ===
for the "Spolied Brat" 7-inch EP (Sweet Rot Records, SRR02):

- Jeffrey Novak: guitar
- Jemina Pearl: bass
- Nathan Vasquez: drums

=== Cheap Time #2 (2007) ===
for the "Handy Man" b/w "Wildlife" 7-inch (Douchemater Records, DMR016):

- Jeffrey Novak: guitar, keyboard, vocals
- Stephen Braren: bass, vocals
- Jon Sewell: drums, percussion

=== Cheap Time #3 (2008) ===
for the Cheap Time LP/CD (In the Red Records, ITR152):

- Jeffrey Novak: guitar, vocals
- Stephen Braren: bass, vocals
- Jon Sewell: drums

=== Cheap Time #4 (2009–2010) ===
for the "Woodland Drive" b/w "Penny and Jenny" 7-inch (In the Red Records, ITR176) and Fantastic Explanations (And Similar Situations) LP/CD (In the Red Records, ITR190):

- Jeffrey Novak: guitar, vocals
- Stephen Braren: bass, vocals, keys
- Ryan Sweeney: drums

=== Cheap Time #5 (2011) ===
for Wallpaper Music LP/CD (In the Red Records, ITR223):

- Jeffrey Novak: guitar, vocals
- Ryan Sweeney: drums
- Matthew Allen: bass, vocals

=== Cheap Time #6 (2012) ===
for the "Other Stories" b/w "In This World" 7-inch (Sweet Rot Records, SRR-31):

- Jeffrey Novak: guitar, vocals
- Ryan Sweeney: drums
- Cole Kinnear: bass, vocals

=== Cheap Time #7 (current line-up) ===
for Exit Smiles LP/CD (In The Red Records, ITR247):

- Jeffrey Novak: guitar, vocals
- Ryan Sweeney: drums
- Jessica McFarland: bass, vocals

== Discography ==
=== Singles ===
"Spoiled Brat" 7-inch (Sweet Rot Records, 2007, SRR 02)

- A1. Spoiled Brat
- B1. Jet Set
- B2. Killing Time

"Handy Man" 7-inch (Douchemaster Records, 2007, DMR 016)

- A1. Handy Man
- B1. Wildlife

"Woodland Drive" 7-inch (In the Red Records, 2009, ITR 176)

- A1. Woodland Drive
- B1. Penny & Jenny

"Another Time" 7-inch (Cass Records, 2011, MAMA-057)

- A1. Another Time
- B1. Immediate Future

"Other Stories" 7-inch (Sweet Rot Records, 2012, SSR 31)

- A1. Other Stories
- B1. In This World

Live at Third Man 7-inch (Third Man Records, 2012, TMR160)

- A1. Macbeth (John Cale)
- B1. Going Out The Way You Came In

"Goodbye Age" 7-inch (Total Punk Records, 2013, TPR-16)

- A1. Goodbye Age
- B1. Soon Over Soon

=== Albums ===
- Cheap Time LP/CD (In the Red, 2008, ITR 152)
1. Too Late
2. Glitter and Gold
3. Zig-Zag
4. People Talk (The End, Jack Oblivian)
5. Push Your Luck
6. Living in the Past
7. Tight Fit
8. Permanent Damage
9. The Ballad of Max Frost
10. Falling Down
11. Over Again
12. Ginger Snap
13. Back to School
14. Trip to the Zoo

Fantastic Explanations (and Similar Situations) LP/CD (In The Red, 2010, ITR 190)

1. When Tomorrow Comes
2. Everyone Knows
3. I'd Rather Be Alone
4. Throwing It All Away
5. Down the Tube
6. Showboat
7. Miss Apparent
8. June Child
9. Woodland Drive
10. Lazy Days
11. Approximately Nowhere
12. Waiting Too Long

Two and a Half Times Around LP (Demos, live on WMFU) (Self-released, 2010)

1. Woodland Drive
2. Glitter and Gold
3. Zig-Zag
4. Back to School
5. Living in the Past
6. People Talk
7. When Tomorrow Comes
8. Penny and Jenny
9. Handy Man
10. Wildlife
11. Down the Tube
12. Falling Down
13. Over Again
14. Trip to the Zoo
15. Too Late
16. Glitter and Gold
17. Zig-Zag
18. Back to School
19. Fake Friends
20. Ginger Snap

Wallpaper Music LP/CD (In the Red, 2012, ITR 223)

1. More Cigarettes
2. Straight and Narrow
3. Hall of Mirrors
4. Another Time
5. Take It If You Want It
6. Dream It Up
7. Night to Night
8. Witches In-Stock
9. Typically Strange
10. Underneath the Fruit Flies

Exit Smiles LP/CD (In the Red, 2013, ITR 247)

1. Exit Smiles
2. Same Surprise
3. Kill the Light
4. Country and City
5. Slow Variety
6. 8:05
7. Spark in the Chain
8. Modern Taste
