= Calpurnia (band) =

Canadian indie rock band

- Origin: Vancouver, British Columbia, Canada
- Genres: Alternative rock; indie rock
- Years active: 2017–2019
- Labels: Royal Mountain (United States and Canada); paradYse; Transgressive (United Kingdom and Europe)
- Past members: Finn Wolfhard; Ayla Tesler-Mabe; Jack Anderson; Malcolm Craig
- Website: calpurniatheband.com

Calpurnia was a Canadian indie rock band formed in 2017, originating from Vancouver. The band consisted of Finn Wolfhard (lead vocals, rhythm guitar), Malcolm Craig (drums), Ayla Tesler-Mabe (lead guitar, vocals), and Jack Anderson (bass, vocals).

The band released their debut single, "City Boy", on 7 March 2018. They announced their debut EP, Scout, alongside the release of the second single, "Louie", on 12 April 2018. On 18 May 2018, they released their third single, "Greyhound", as their first single on vinyl. Scout was released on 15 June 2018. On 8 November 2019, the band announced on their official Instagram page that they were parting ways.

== Career ==
Before Calpurnia's formation, Finn Wolfhard had met drummer Malcolm Craig in 2014, on the set of the music video for "Guilt Trip" by PUP, while guitarist Ayla Tesler-Mabe was a friend from rock camp, and bassist Jack Anderson was recruited for a charity fundraiser. The band officially formed in 2017, named after the maternal figure housekeeper in Harper Lee's 1960 Southern Gothic classic novel; To Kill a Mockingbird, with their first release being a cover of "Wanted You" by Twin Peaks.

The band signed with the Canadian independent record label Royal Mountain Records in November 2017 and began recording an EP, with Cadien Lake James of Twin Peaks producing and engineering. In January 2018, the band performed at the Rough Trade in New York City, covering "Here She Comes Now" by The Velvet Underground, "Where Is My Mind?" by Pixies, "El Scorcho" by Weezer and "Butterfly" by Twin Peaks.

The band's official debut, "City Boy", was released on 7 March 2018 and was the lead single of their then-unannounced Scout EP. The single debuted at No. 23 on the Billboard Alternative Digital Song Sales chart with sales of 2,000 units. The second single, "Louie", was released by the band on 12 April, with the band simultaneously announcing the forthcoming release of the Scout EP, slated for 15 June 2018. The band made their television debut on 23 July 2018 as the musical guest on Jimmy Kimmel Live.

In February 2019, Weezer featured the four members of Calpurnia as the stars of their new music video for their cover of the a-ha track "Take On Me," from the album Weezer (The Teal Album). The video takes a trip back to the 1980s, paying tribute to the original music video by a-ha. The decision to have Calpurnia participate in the video was solidified after Weezer had requested the band cover their hit song "Say It Ain't So" for Spotify's Under Cover podcast in 2018. The band announced on Instagram that they had split up on 8 November 2019.

== Band members ==
- Finn Wolfhard – lead vocals, rhythm guitar
- Ayla Tesler-Mabe – lead guitar, vocals
- Jack Anderson – bass
- Malcolm Craig – drums

== Discography ==
=== Extended plays ===
Title	Details
Scout	Release: 15 June 2018: Label: Royal Mountain (US/CA); paradYse; Transgressive (UK/EU); Format: Digital download, CD, vinyl

=== Covers ===
- "Where Is My Mind" by Pixies (2017)
- "Wanted You" by Twin Peaks (2017)
- "My Kind of Woman" by Mac DeMarco (2017)
- "El Scorcho" by Weezer (2017)
- "Age of Consent" by New Order (2017)
- "Say It Ain't So" by Weezer (2018)
- "Love Buzz" by Shocking Blue (2019)
- "Marquee Moon" by Television (2019)
- "Take On Me" by A-ha (2019)
