= Cheater Slicks =

American garage punk band

Cheater Slicks is a three-man garage punk band formed in Boston in 1987. The members are Tom Shannon (guitar, vocals), Dave Shannon (guitar), and Dana Hatch (drums, vocals). They toured with Jon Spencer Blues Explosion in 1995.

In their early days they experimented with a couple of different singers and periods as an instrumental band before Tom and Dana assumed vocal duties. They also went through a succession of bassists - Dina Pearlman (daughter of Alan R. Pearlman), Allan Paulinho ("Alpo" from the Real Kids), and finally Merle Allin (brother of G.G. Allin) - before deciding to go bassless like the Cramps.

The band relocated to Columbus, OH, in 1996 and is still active. They played their 20th anniversary show on Sept. 1, 2007. They have released several albums on In the Red Records.

The band received special notice when Mudhoney covered their song "Ghost" on their fifth studio album "Tomorrow Hit Today".

Almost Ready Records has re-released three of Cheater Slicks' albums on vinyl. "On Your Knees" in 2016, and "Destination Lonely" in 2017. In 2011 Almost Ready Records released "Our Food Is Chaos: Allen Paulino Session" for the first time on vinyl. They also appear on 2012's "The World's Lousy With Ideas Vol 9", another Almost Ready Records release.

== Discography ==
=== Albums ===
- On Your Knees (LP Gawdawful, 1989)
- Destination Lonely (LP/CD Dogmeat, 1992)
- Whiskey (LP/CD In The Red Records, 1993)
- Don't Like You (LP/CD In The Red Records, 1995)
- Forgive Thee (double CD In The Red Records, 1998)
- Skidmarks (LP/CD Crypt, 1998)
- Refried Dreams (LP/CD In The Red Records, 1999)
- Yer Last Record (LP Secret Keeper/CD In The Red Records, 2003)
- Walk Into the Sea (LP Dead Canary 2007)
- Bats in the Dead Trees (LP Lost Treasures of the Underworld 2009)
- Our Food Is Chaos: Allen Paulino Session (LP Almost Ready Records 2011)
- Live 2010 Vol. 1 (LP Columbus Discount Records 2011)
- Live 2010 Vol. 2 (LP Columbus Discount Records 2012)
- Reality Is a Grape (LP Columbus Discount Records 2012)
- On Your Knees (LP reissue Almost Ready Records 2016)
- Destination Lonely (LP reissue Almost Ready Records 2017)

=== Singles ===
- If Heaven Is Your Home (Dog Meat Records, 1990)
- You Don't Satisfy (Sympathy For The Record Industry, 1990)
- Chaos (Gift Of Life, 1991)
- I'm Grounded (In The Red Records, 1991)
- Rum Drunk (Dog Meat Records, 1991)
- Golddigger (Rekkids, 1992)
- 84 Ford 79 (Estrus, 1992)
- Walk Up The Street (In The Red Records, 1994)
- Trouble Man (Crypt, 1995)
- Giveaway (Mind Of A Child Records, 1997)
- Erotic Woman/Can You Hear My Heartbeat (Columbus Discount Records, 2009)
- Silver Fox on World's Lousy With Ideas Vol 9 (Almost Ready Records, 2012)
