= Meatbodies =

American garage rock band

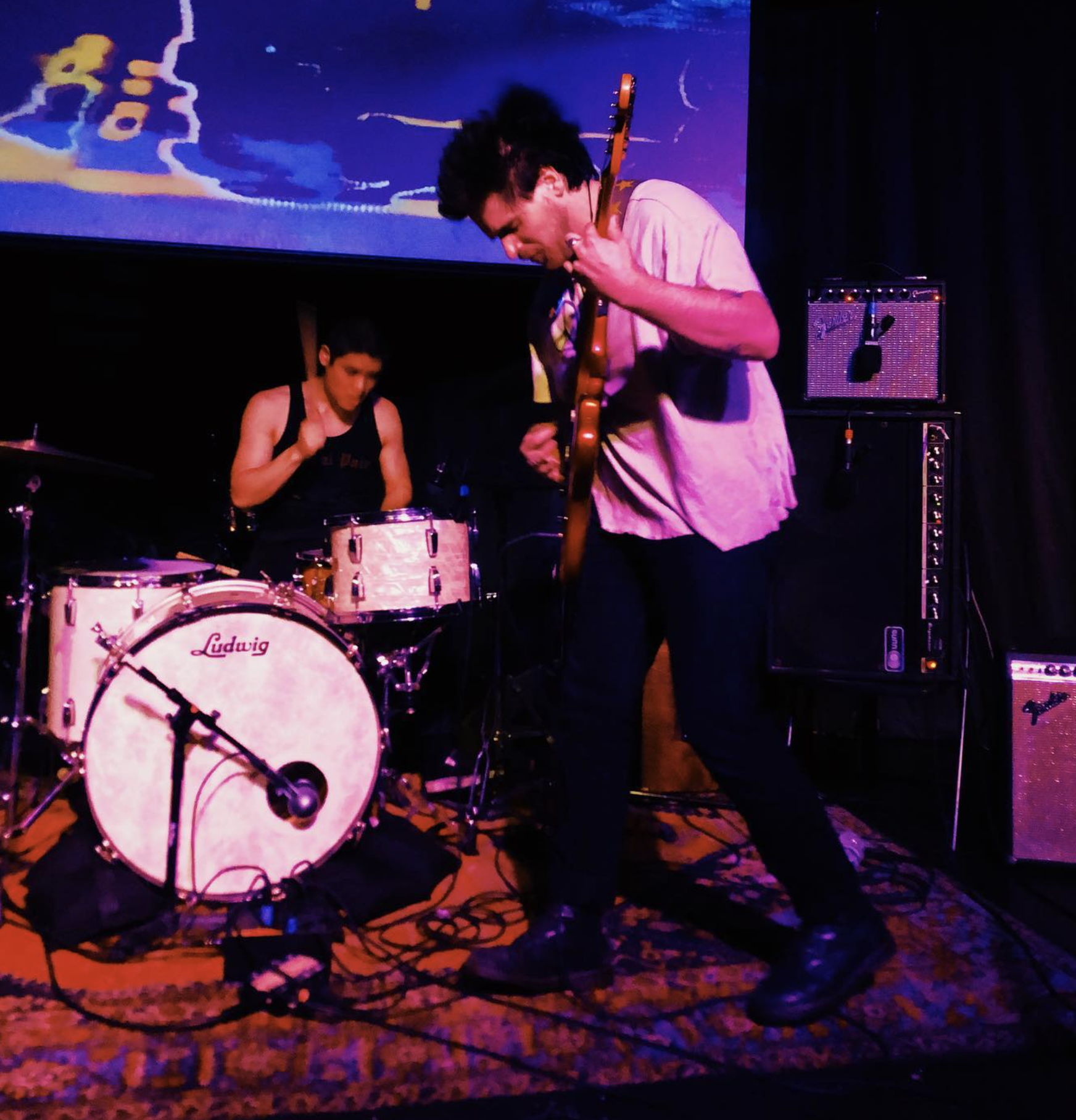
- Meatbodies in 2019

Background information
- Origin: Los Angeles, California, United States
- Genres: Garage rock, psychedelic rock, garage punk, noise rock, lo-fi
- Years active: 2011–present
- Labels: In the Red, God? Records
- Members: Chad Ubovich; Dylan Fujioka; Noah Guevara; Casey Hanson
- Past members: Cory Hanson; Riley Youngdahl; Erik Jimenez; Patrick Nolan; Kevin Boog

Meatbodies is an American psychedelic rock band, formed in 2011 in Los Angeles, California by Chad Ubovich. The band is currently composed of Chad Ubovich, Dylan Fujioka, Noah Guevara, and Casey Hanson.

== History ==
=== Formation and Meatbodies (2011–2014) ===
Prior to forming Meatbodies, Chad Ubovich occupied the role of bass guitarist for the Mikal Cronin band and went on tour with Ty Segall as he toured his studio album, Goodbye Bread (2011). Ubovich soon switched to guitar within the band and toured with Cronin for the next five years.

While touring, Ubovich began working on the songs that would become the band's debut album, Meatbodies (2014).

Going under the moniker Chad and the Meatbodies, he supported different acts around Los Angeles including Ty Segall and Charles Moothart's hard rock band Fuzz, which he would later join. Segall subsequently encouraged Ubovich to record his music and offered to release it on his label, God? Records. The resultant self-titled cassette, Chad and the Meatbodies, sold out its initial run.

Very soon after, the band caught the attention of In the Red Records, and was sent out to record their debut studio album with producer Eric Bauer.

Ubovich, brought on a plethora of musicians to record the album including: Ty Segall, Cory Hanson, Erik Jiminez, and Ryley Youngdahl. All of whom had previously performed at one point as the Chad and The Meatbodies band.

The album was mixed by producer/engineer Chris Woodhouse, and the band changed their name simply to Meatbodies. The album was released in 2014.

=== Alice (2015–2017) ===
After touring their debut album, Chad Ubovich began writing and touring with Fuzz. During this time he began creating material for Meatbodies’ second album Alice (2017) . Ubovich stated : “A lot of the concepts on this album started while I was on the road with Fuzz, and there was a lot of crazy stuff going on at the time.” “I’m talking politically, socially, and worldly. There were a lot of things going on when we made that album, and then when we went on the road with that album, there was even more going on. It was crazy, just watching the news all the time. I just wanted to say something about it, and started conceptualizing this story. I knew I wanted to make a story, or a loose story at least.”

Ubovich utilized some of the members of the rotating live band at the time to write and record these concepts including : Patrick Nolan, Kevin Boog, and once again, Erik Jiminez. The album was recorded for a second time at The Bauer Mansion with Eric Bauer in San Francisco. This time being self produced and mixed by Ubovich himself.

Alice is described as a "loose concept album". Ubovich has stated: “Alice is a theory. It's a made-up concept. It's almost like made-up scripture.” The album was released in 2017, although was recorded a year prior, but the release was pushed back due to technical discrepancies with the length of the vinyl. Resulting in the opening track The Burning Fields being left off the vinyl and kept only online and on CD.

=== 333 (2018–2021) ===
333 is the third album from Meatbodies. It is technically an EP. The recordings were done in Chad Ubovich's bedroom with long time friend and drummer Dylan Fujioka, best known for work with Upsilon Acrux, and Chelsea Wolfe. The songs were part of a batch of demos for an unreleased album that got its production halted due to the COVID-19 pandemic. In its place, 333 was released until further production could be made. Regarding the recording process Ubovich stated : “We were actually demoing for another album.” “We had a drum kit set up in my room with my tape machine and a lot of the songs that are on 333 are those songs. They were kind of put off to the side, and I didn’t listen back until the pandemic was going on. I found them and was like, oh shit, this is pretty cool; let’s make this something.”

=== Flora Ocean Tiger Bloom (2023–present) ===
On December 7, Meatbodies announced their fourth album (third overall) Flora Ocean Tiger Bloom, which was released on March 8, 2024. Tour dates for the US were also announced for 2024.

== Discography ==
Studio albums

- Meatbodies (2014)
- Alice (2017)
- 333 (2021)
- Flora Ocean Tiger Bloom (2024)

Singles

- Chad and The Meatbodies (2013, cassette)
- Wahoo / Steps (2014)
- Meatbodies / Wand – Void (2014)
- Mud Gals (2014)
- Valley Girl / Hibernation (2016)
