= Western Cum =

Studio album by Cory Hanson
- Released: June 23, 2023
- Studio: The Coconut Hotel; Flying Pants Studios; Golden Beat Studios
- Genre: Country rock; psychedelic rock
- Length: 39:12
- Label: Drag City

Cory Hanson chronology
Pale Horse Rider (2021)	Western Cum (2023)	I Love People (2025)

"I think that I unlocked something in my own songwriting... So on one side, it was like Miles Davis. And then on the other side, it was like George Strait and Faith Hill and Shania Twain. And I loved all that stuff growing up.... Through that, I got into Willie Nelson because he takes jazz, standard country, rock, blues, and then he's the glue. He puts them all together. And that really made me realize.... This is really tying together all these American influences that I have, that are really a part of my DNA."

—Hanson on songwriting and blending genres.

Western Cum is the third studio album by American psychedelic rock musician Cory Hanson, released by Drag City on June 23, 2023. It has received positive reviews from critics.

== Reception ==
According to the review aggregator Metacritic, Western Cum received "universal acclaim" based on a weighted average score of 88 out of 100 from four critic scores. Editors at AllMusic rated this album 4 out of 5 stars, with critic Fred Thomas writing that "the overpowering guitars and relentlessly complex song structures that make up the majority of the album feel more like the sounds Hanson makes with Wand than something unique to his solo iteration, but he shares some new windows into his wonderfully mystifying psyche all the same". Writing for Paste, Matt Mitchell gave this album an 8.5 out of 10, characterizing it as "a merciless, gravitational, witty and absurd benchmark of technicolor rock ‘n’ roll... with a bluesy, unsaturated voice sanded down into an airy breeze that perfectly compliments the delicious solos and uptempo progressions".

Paste included this among the 30 best rock albums of 2023. Uncut editor Michael Bonner included this album on his list of the best of the year. Editors at AllMusic included this among their favorite singer-songwriter music albums of 2023.

== Track listing ==
All songs written by Cory Hanson.

1. "Wings" – 4:57
2. "Housefly" – 3:19
3. "Persuasion Architecture" – 4:09
4. "Horsebait Sabotage" – 3:57
5. "Ghost Ship" – 4:11
6. "Twins" – 3:04
7. "Driving Through Heaven" – 10:29
8. "Motion Sickness" – 5:07

== Personnel ==
- Cory Hanson – guitar, vocals, engineering, mixing, overdubs
- Evan Backer – drums
- Robbie Cody – recording, engineering, mixing
- Casey Hanson – bass guitar
- Zac Hernandez – recording, engineering, mixing
- Heba Kadry – mastering
- Sam Klickner – artwork, layout
- Tyler Nuffer – guitar, pedal steel guitar
- Asal Shahindoust – photography
