= Down in Heaven =

Studio album by Twin Peaks
- Released: May 13, 2016
- Genre: Garage rock
- Length: 41:58
- Labels: Grand Jury; Communion
- Producers: Twin Peaks; R. Andrew Humphrey

Twin Peaks chronology
Wild Onion (2014)	Down in Heaven (2016)	Urbs in Horto (2017)

Twin Peaks studio album chronology
Wild Onion (2014)	Down in Heaven (2016)	Lookout Low (2019)

Down in Heaven is the third studio album by Twin Peaks, released May 13, 2016 on Grand Jury Music in North America and Communion Music internationally. Twin Peaks recorded the bulk of the album in August 2015 with R. Andrew Humphrey co-producing. This is the band's first album to feature keyboardist and guitarist Colin Croom, who joined prior to the recording of the album.

== Reception ==
Professional ratings
Aggregate scores
Source	Rating
Metacritic	74/100
Review scores
Source	Rating
AllMusic	4/5 stars
Clash	8/10
Consequence of Sound	C+
The Line of Best Fit	8.5/10
Paste	8.1/10
Pitchfork	7.2/10
PopMatters	8/10 stars
Spin	7/10

Down in Heaven received generally positive reviews from music critics. Grant Rindner of The Line of Best Fit said, "The band has always walked a delicate line between thoughtful, psychedelic pop and rollicking power chords, and they've perfected this balancing act on Down in Heaven... With their third album, Twin Peaks have become not just one of the most exciting young bands in the Chicago music scene, but in the entire rock landscape." Other critics noted the band's move towards songs of a slower tempo. Stuart Berman of Pitchfork described the album as "a casual, charmingly low-key set of kitchen-table blues, slow-dance serenades, and unplugged power pop. Here, Twin Peaks aren't so interested in being the life of party as documenting what happens outside of it: the awkward first kisses, the difficult break-up conversations, the sad walks home alone." Adrien Begrand of Spin stated that it's "satisfying to hear young rock bands with rich knowledge of the genre's history, trying their damnedest to capture the energy of old records from a bygone era" and said, "The unhinged energy of [Wild Onion] has been toned down in favor of a more sedate approach, and although that immediate, primal energy is missed upon initial listens, the more relaxed approach fits rather well... This young band's musical growth supersedes the album's imperfections, and hopefully Down in Heaven will eventually be regarded as a transition to something more career-defining."

== Track listing ==
All tracks are written by Cadien Lake James, Clay Frankel, Colin Croom, Connor Brodner and Jack Dolan.

No.	Title	Lead vocals	Length
1.	"Walk to the One You Love"	Cadien James	3:33
2.	"Wanted You"	Clay Frankel	3:23
3.	"My Boys"	Jack Dolan	3:26
4.	"Butterfly"	Frankel	3:11
5.	"You Don't"	James	3:22
6.	"Cold Lips"	Frankel	3:38
7.	"Heavenly Showers"	Frankel	3:02
8.	"Keep It Together"	Colin Croom	2:27
9.	"Getting Better"	Dolan	2:43
10.	"Holding Roses"	Frankel	2:38
11.	"Lolisa"	James	3:26
12.	"Stain"	Frankel	3:56
13.	"Have You Ever?"	Frankel	3:21
Total length:			41:58

== Personnel ==
Twin Peaks

- Connor Brodner – drums
- Colin Croom – lead vocals (8), keyboards, guitar
- Jack Dolan – lead vocals (3, 9), bass guitar
- Clay Frankel – lead vocals (2, 4, 6, 7, 10, 12, 13), guitar
- Cadien Lake James – lead vocals (1, 5, 11), guitar

Additional musicians

- Kevin Decker – baritone saxophone
- Will Miller – trumpet
- Irvine Pierce – tenor saxophone

Production

- John Agnello – mixing
- Greg Calbi – mastering
- R. Andrew Humphrey – producer
- Twin Peaks – producer
