= Laughing Matter =

Studio album by Wand
- Released: April 19, 2019
- Length: 67:28
- Label: Drag City

Wand chronology
Perfume (2018)	Laughing Matter (2019)	Spiders in the Rain (2022)

Singles from Laughing Matter
- 1. "Scarecrow" Released: February 5, 2019

Laughing Matter is the fifth studio album by American band Wand. It was released on April 19, 2019, through Drag City Records.

== Reception ==
Professional ratings
Aggregate scores
Source	Rating
Metacritic	77/100
Review scores
Source	Rating
AllMusic	3.5/5 stars
Exclaim!	8/10
Paste	8.6/10
Pitchfork	7.5/10
Under the Radar	8/10

Accolades for Laughing Matter
Publication	Accolade	Rank
Stereogum	Top 50 Albums of 2019 (Mid-Year)	49

== Track listing ==
Laughing Matter track listing
No.	Title	Length
1.	"Scarecrow"	5:17
2.	"Xoxo"	4:05
3.	"Bubble"	2:05
4.	"High Planes Drifter"	2:41
5.	"Walkie Talkie"	4:32
6.	"Thin Air"	4:34
7.	"Hare"	3:35
8.	"Wonder"	6:22
9.	"Evening Star"	5:45
10.	"Tortoise"	2:21
11.	"Rio Grande"	3:44
12.	"Airplane"	9:11
13.	"Lucky's Sight"	6:10
14.	"Wonder 2"	4:05
15.	"Jennifer's Gone"	3:01

== Personnel ==
Sourced from AllMusic.

Wand

- Cory Hanson
- Robert Cody – guitar, guitars, Korg synthesizer, Mellotron, prepared piano, handclapping
- Sofia Arreguin – vocals, Mellotron, Minimoog, piano, Roland Juno 6, Wurlitzer, percussion
- Lee Landey – bass, field recording, Korg synthesizer, Minimoog, Prophet synthesizer
- Evan Burrows – vocals, drums, percussion, field recording, Korg synthesizer

== Charts ==
Chart performance for Laughing Matter
Chart	Peak position
US Heatseekers Albums (Billboard)	21
