= Miss Alex White =

American musician

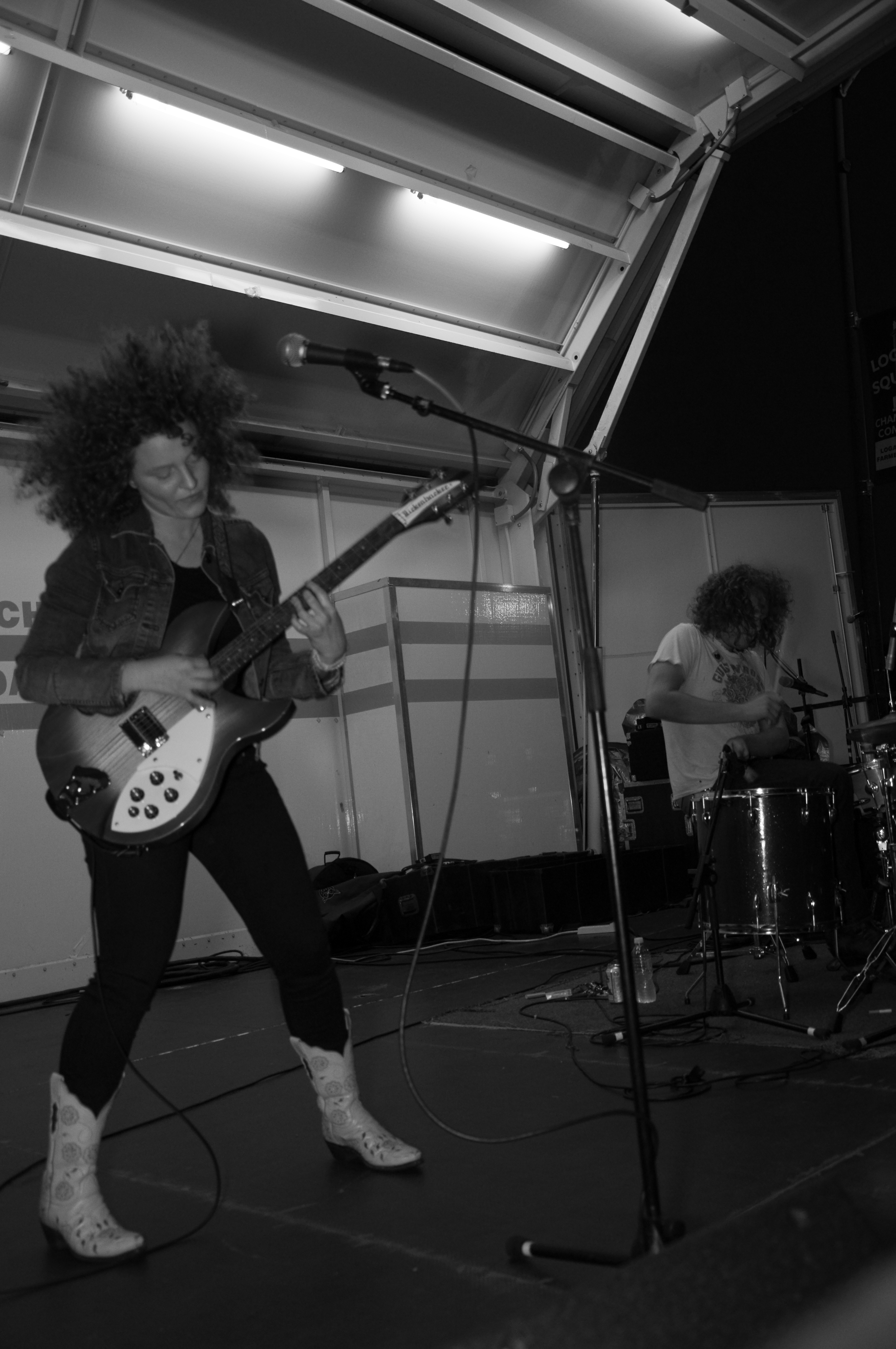
Miss Alex White (left) playing guitar with her band White Mystery

Miss Alex White is the stage name for Alexandra Brooks White, an American musician from Chicago, Illinois, United States, and founder of Missile X Records born April 30, 1985. Her projects have included Miss Alex White and Chris Playboy (a collaboration with Chris Saathoff), the Hot Machines, Miss Alex White and the Red Orchestra, and White Mystery, a collaboration with her younger brother, drummer Francis Scott Key White.

== Early career ==
White began playing guitar at age 13 after being motivated by hearing the Who. She released her first music in 2003 and made several recordings with Chris Playboy, also known as Chris Saathoff, who died in a car accident on February 13, 2004; White was responsible for creating the Chris Saathoff Foundation following his death. Soon after, she formed Miss Alex White and the Red Orchestra. The band recorded their first, self-titled album with producer Jim Diamond in Detroit, and their second, Space & Time, at the Distillery in Costa Mesa, California, with producer Mike McHugh. Both albums were released on In the Red Records.

== Career and education ==
Alexandra Brooks White is a graduate of Northside College Prep and DePaul University with a Masters of Business degree (MBA) in Business Management and undergraduate degree in Entrepreneurial Studies. She served as Vice President of The Recording Academy - Chicago Chapter until April 2017.

== With White Mystery ==
White founded her current group, White Mystery, with her brother Francis on April 20, 2008, named after an Airheads flavor. White Mystery is known for their relentless tour schedule in which White claims to have played 1,000 shows in the band’s first ten years. The group has played with national acts such as Garbage, Shonen Knife, The Stooges and Weezer. They played on a parade float with Sir Richard Branson for the grand opening of Virgin Hotels Chicago. The group has released nine full-length albums as of 2018.

On April 1, 2016, White Mystery premiered "Best Friend" on the NBC Carson Daly Show, “Last Call” and announced forthcoming record Outta Control which is titled in reference to the same Airheads flavor from which the band name is derived. They described it in an interview with Transverso Media as their "pop masterpiece."

== Equipment ==
White’s signature guitar is her Fireglo Rickenbacker 330, a guitar that she has mainly used for all of her projects. She is also sponsored by Orange Amplifiers.

In 2014 White Mystery was featured in an expansive Levi’s ad campaign, with their images being used in such magazines as Rolling Stone, SPIN, and Pitchfork.

== Influences ==
White cites her biggest influences as The MC5, Marc Bolan of T. Rex, Tina Turner, and Poison Ivy of the Cramps respectively. On White Mystery's website, she lists Roger Daltrey from the Who, Cheetah Chrome from the Dead Boys, Arthur “Killer” Kane from the New York Dolls, Brian Jones of The Rolling Stones, and Led Zeppelin as alternative influences.

== Discography ==
White Mystery

- "Buttheads from Mars REMIX" (Digital remix with Unkle Funkle 2019)
- "Hellion Blender" (Vinyl on Romanus Records 2018) (Tape on Eye Vybe Records)
- "F*ck Your Mouth Shut" a.k.a. "F.Y.M.S" (White Mystery Band LP 2017)
- "Outta Control" (White Mystery Band CD) (Surfin' Ki Records LP 2016)
- "That Was Awesome" (White Mystery Band, Film/Tape Cassette 2015)
- "Dubble Dragon" (White Mystery Band LP 2014)
- "Telepathic" (White Mystery Band LP/CD 2013)
- "People Power" (Perpetrator 7" 2012)
- "Blood & Venom" (White Mystery Band LP/CD 2011)
- "White Mystery" (White Mystery Band LP/CD 2010)
- "Take a Walk" (Whistler Records 7" 2009)
- "Power Glove" (HoZac Hook Up Club 7" 2009)

Schiller Killers

- "Wicker Park Strangler" (Rubber Vomit 7" 2010)

Miss Alex White and the Red Orchestra:

- "SPACE & TIME" (LP/CD In The Red Records 2007)
- "Miss Alex White And The Red Orchestra" (LP/CD In The Red Records 2005)

Candy Apple Killings

- "Leather for Liquor" (Solid Sex Lovie Doll 7" 2006)

Miss Alex White and Chris Playboy:

- Miss Alex White and Chris Playboy Live (LP, In The Red Records, 2006)
- Miss Alex White and Chris Playboy (7", Missile X Records 2003)

Hot Machines:

- Hot Machines 2 (7", Dusty Medical Records, 2006)
- Hole In My Heart (7", Cass Records, 2005)
- Maybe Chicago Compilation (Criminal IQ Records 2003)
- "Can't Feel" on skateboard video, "That's Life" (Foundation/Tum Yeto, 2003)

Missile X Records

- "Young Monsters" Miss Alex White & Chris Playboy (7")
- "Cold River" The Dirges (7")
- "Spend the Night in a Haunted House" The Spits (7")

== Movie ==
- That Was Awesome Self Produced 2015
