= Pale Horse Rider =

Studio album by Cory Hanson
- Released: April 16, 2021
- Recorded: December 2019 (Cactopia), January 2020 (Pine Room)
- Studio: Cactopia, Lander, California, United States; Pine Room, Mount Washington, Los Angeles, California, United States
- Genre: Country rock; folk rock; psychedelic folk; psychedelic rock
- Length: 38:54
- Label: Drag City

Cory Hanson chronology
The Unborn Capitalist from Limbo (2016)	Pale Horse Rider (2021)	Western Cum (2023)

Lyrically, I was coming from the angle of the classic country music records, writing about a bunch of lowdown losers, suckers and all the people that somebody like Donald Trump would describe as the average American, people living free lives.

—Hanson on the lyrics of Pale Horse Rider

Pale Horse Rider is the second studio album by American psychedelic rock musician Cory Hanson, released by Drag City on April 16, 2021. It has received positive reviews from critics.

== Reception ==
According to the review aggregator Metacritic, Pale Horse Rider received "universal acclaim" based on a weighted average score of 82 out of 100 from six critic scores. Editors at AllMusic rated this album 4 out of 5 stars, with critic Fred Thomas writing the music is "lonely, lamenting, and distant but beautifully warm, marrying Hanson's love of psychedelic experimentation with a more cosmic take on country". Stuart Berman of Pitchfork gave this release a 7.5 out of 10, for combining Americana and chamber pop with an "uncanny vibe" "heightened by Hanson’s lyrics, which blur the line between fact and fable". In Record Collector, Kevin Harley scored this album 4 out of 5 stars, calling it "the equivalent of an open-skied breather" that "tread[s] cosmic country terrain with a cogent confidence in restraint and controlled reserves of psychedelic colour". In The Sydney Morning Herald, Barnaby Smith gave this album 4.5 out of 5 stars, calling this a "textured and complex affair, combining folk-based foundations with synthesisers, soundscapes, guitar effects and even field recordings". Editors at Uncut chose this as Album of the Month, giving it an 8 out of 10, with critic Peter Watts praising the full band orchestration, calling it stronger than Hanson's 2016 effort The Unborn Capitalist from Limbo and stating that this is an "impressive record" for having the confidence to experiment.

== Track listing ==
All songs written by Cory Hanson.

1. "Paper Fog" – 4:30
2. "Angeles" – 5:02
3. "Pale Horse Rider" – 4:06
4. "Necklace" – 1:48
5. "Bird of Paradise" – 3:26
6. "Limited Hangout" – 3:30
7. "Vegas Knights" – 2:19
8. "Surface to Air" – 1:11
9. "Another Story from the Center of the Earth" – 7:54
10. "Pigs" – 5:09

== Personnel ==
- Cory Hanson – guitar, steel guitar, vocals, engineering, field recordings, mixing at Jizz Jazz Studios, Echo Park, Los Angeles, California, United States
- Sofia Arreguin – tambourine on "Pigs"
- Evan Backer – bass guitar, drums, percussion, piano, wah wah guitar, Wurlitzer
- Robert Cody – engineering, mixing assistance
- Justin Gallego – artwork, layout
- Zac Hernandez – engineer, mixing, cover photography
- Shelby Jacobson – backing vocals on "Vegas Knights"
- Heba Kadry – mastering
- Heather Lockie – viola on "Pale Horse Rider", "Vegas Knights", and "Pig"
- Tyler Nuffer – lap steel guitar, pedal steel guitar, bass guitar on "Pale Horse Rider"

== See also ==
- List of 2021 albums
