= The King Brothers (blues group) =

The King Brothers are an American blues group led by drummer Sam King and guitarist Lee King. They released two albums, Turnin' Up The Heat in 1997, and Mo' Heat in 2001.
