= In the Red Records =

American independent record label

- Founded: 1991
- Founder: Larry Hardy
- Genre: Rock, garage rock
- Country of origin: United States
- Location: Los Angeles, California
- Official website: intheredrecords.com

In the Red Records is an independent record label in Los Angeles, California, formed in 1991 by Larry Hardy. It is known for hosting garage rock related bands.

The label's first release was by The Morlocks, and its second release was Kings of Rock. Hardy has publicly stated that he wished he would have waited for Mick Collins' The Gories material to be finished for the first release. However the Gories recording was slow going and Larry became impatient, rushing the two initial releases into production.

Bands that have released LPs on this label include Cheap Time, Cheater Slicks, Osees, Reigning Sound, Dan Melchior's Broke Revue, Des Demonas, The Ponys, The Intelligence, The Hunches, The Dirtbombs, The Deadly Snakes, Sparks, Andre Williams, Black Lips, LAMPS, Pussy Galore, Boss Hog, Jon Spencer Blues Explosion, Jay Reatard, The Horrors, Bassholes, The Fuse, Country Teasers, The King Khan & BBQ Show, Panther Burns, Demon's Claws, Mark Sultan, Vivian Girls, Monkey Wrench, Human Eye, Shark Toys, Strange Boys, Blank Dogs, Dávila 666, Speedball Baby, Sonic Chicken 4, Wounded Lion, Meatbodies, Fuzz, Lydia Lunch & The Art Gray Noizz Quintet, and Genre Is Death.

== Current artists ==
- Action Swingers
- A.H. Kraken
- Alice Bag
- Arndales
- Bassholes
- Blacktop
- Blank Dogs
- Boss Hog
- CCR Headcleaner
- CFM
- Cheap Time
- Cheater Slicks
- Christmas Island
- Clone Defects
- Consumers
- Thee Cormans
- Country Teasers
- Dan Melchior's Broke Revue
- Danny & the Darleans
- Davilla 666
- The Deadly Snakes
- Demolition Doll Rods
- Demon's Claws
- Dion Lunadon
- The Dirtbombs
- The Double
- Eastlink
- Ex-Cult
- Feedtime
- The Fresh & Onlys
- The Fuse!
- Fuzz
- G0ggs
- Genre Is Death
- Haunted George
- The Horrors
- The Hospitals
- Human Eye
- The Hunches
- The Intelligence
- The Intended
- Jay Reatard
- Jon Spencer Blues Explosion
- Kid Congo
- Kim Salmon & the Surrealists
- King Brothers
- King Khan & BBQ Show
- Knoxville Girls
- Lamps
- Lili Z
- Lord High Fixers
- Lost Sounds
- Lydia Lunch & The Art Gray Noizz Quintet
- Meatbodies
- Milk Lines
- Miss Alex White
- Mystery Girls
- Necessary Evils
- Now Time Delegation
- Osees
- Pampers
- Parting Gifts
- The Piranhas
- Ponys
- Power
- Pussy Galore
- Red Aunts
- Reigning Sound
- The Screws
- Shark Toys
- The Side Eyes
- Sleeping Beauties
- Sparks
- Speedball Baby
- The Spits
- Strange Boys
- Submarine Races
- Mark Sultan
- Timmy's Organism
- The Traditional Fools
- TV Ghost
- Ty Segall Band
- Tyvek
- Vivian Girls
- Volt
- Wand
- Watery Love
- Andre Williams
- Wolfmanhattan Project
- Wounded Lion
- Zig Zags

== See also ==
- List of record labels
